= Honda Group, Colombia =

Geological group in the Colombian Andes

Honda Group
- Stratigraphic range: Late Oligocene-Late Miocene typically Middle Miocene (Laventan); ~13.8–11.8 Ma
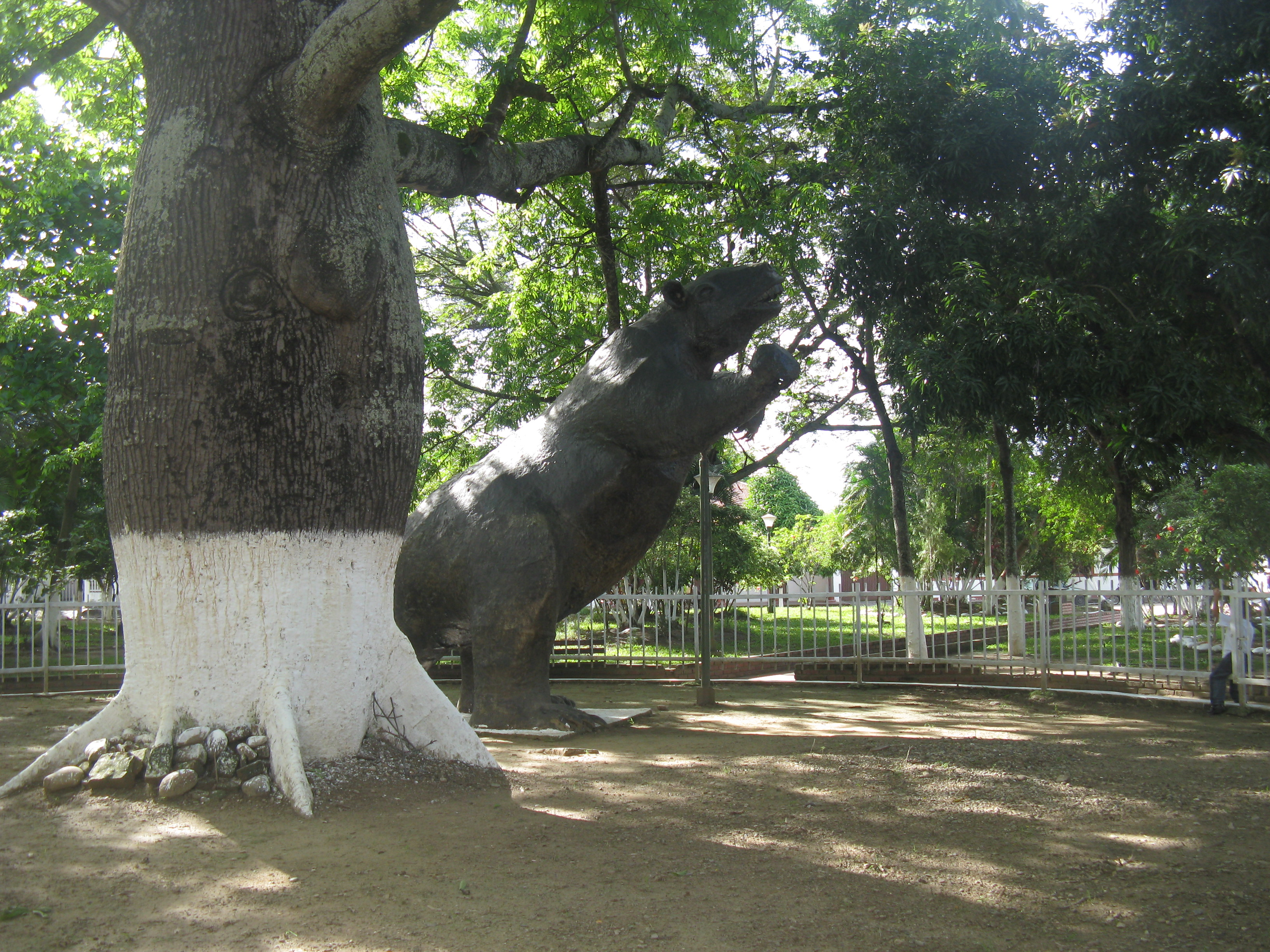
- Statue of a prehistoric ground sloth from the Honda Group in Villavieja, Huila
- Type: Geological group
- Sub-units: Villavieja Formation; Cerro Colorado Mb. Baraya Mb. La Victoria Fm. Cerbatana Mb.
- Underlies: Gigante Group; Neiva Fm.
- Overlies: Payandé Group; Barzalosa Fm., Saldaña Fm., Santa Teresa Fm.
- Thickness: up to 5,000 m (16,000 ft)

Lithology
- Primary: Conglomerate, sandstone
- Other: Claystone, siltstone, volcanoclastic sediments

Location
- Coordinates: 5°11′31″N 74°43′21″W
- Region: Huila, Tolima, Cundinamarca; Middle Magdalena Valley, Upper Magdalena Valley; Central & Eastern Ranges; Andes
- Country: Colombia
- Extent: ~250 km (160 mi)

Type section
- Named for: Honda
- Named by: Hettner
- Location: Honda (original); Tatacoa Desert (redefined)
- Year defined: 1892
- Coordinates: 3°14′04″N 75°12′15″W
- Approximate paleocoordinates: 3.1°N 72.4°W
- Region: Tolima (original); Huila (redefined)
- Country: Colombia
- Thickness at type section: 3,255 m (10,679 ft)
- Honda Group, Colombia (Colombia)

The Honda Group (Spanish: Grupo Honda, Tsh, Ngh) is a geological group of the Upper and Middle Magdalena Basins and the adjacent Central and Eastern Ranges of the Colombian Andes. The group, in older literature also defined as formation, is in its present-day type section in the Tatacoa Desert in the department of Huila subdivided into two main formations; La Victoria and Villavieja.

The group was originally defined in and named after Honda, Tolima, but has been redefined based on the many fossil finds in the Tatacoa Desert, 250 kilometres (160 mi) to the south. In the original type section of its occurrence, the 3,255 metres (10,679 ft) thick group is subdivided into three formations, from old to young; Cambrás, San Antonio and Los Limones.

The group dates to the Neogene period; in its broadest definition from the Late Oligocene to Late Miocene, and in the redefined type section restricted to the Laventan age of the South American Land Mammal Ages (SALMA), equivalent to the Middle Miocene Serravallian epoch.

The Honda Group is a Konzentrat-Lagerstätte at the fossiliferous La Venta site in the department of Huila and eastern Tolima and hosts one of the richest formations containing Miocene fauna worldwide.

== Etymology and definitions ==
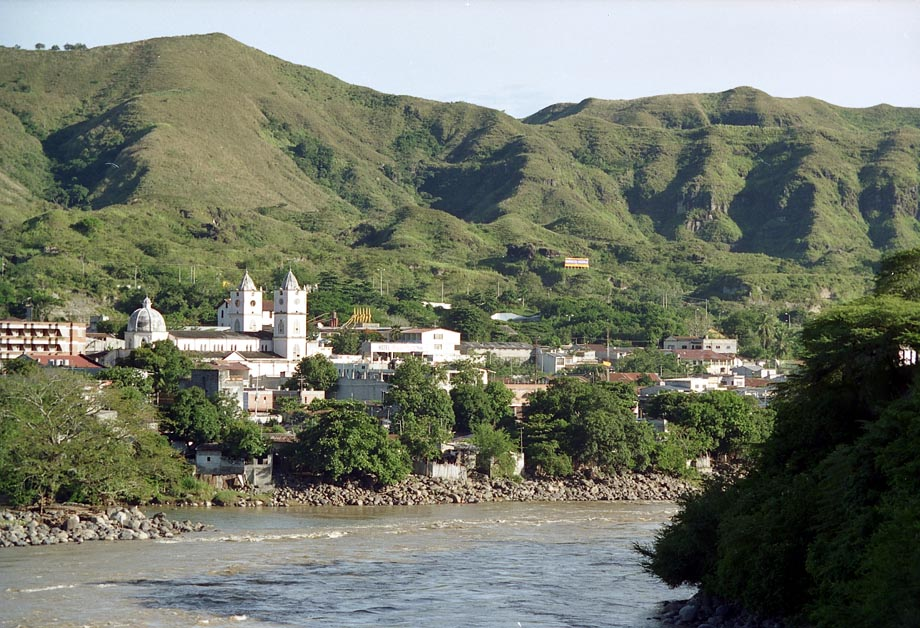
View of Honda, Tolima, namesake of the Honda Group

The group was first defined by Hettner in 1892 in the area of the town after which it is named; Honda, Tolima. In 1942 and 1946, the group was defined as a formation by Royo and Gómez. The first author who used the name Honda for a group, was American zoologist who studied the La Venta fauna in detail, Ruben Arthur Stirton. Subdivisions of the group have been proposed by many different authors with high detail in the different beds. Names as "Monkey Beds", "Fish Beds" and "Unit above Fish Beds" have been colloquially used to designate certain stratigraphic units based on their fossil content. The most accepted definition of the group, formations and members was proposed by Villarroel et al. in 1996 to simplify the stratigraphy in a regional sense solving the excessive subdivision into 19 units by Guerrero et al. (1994).

== Regional setting ==
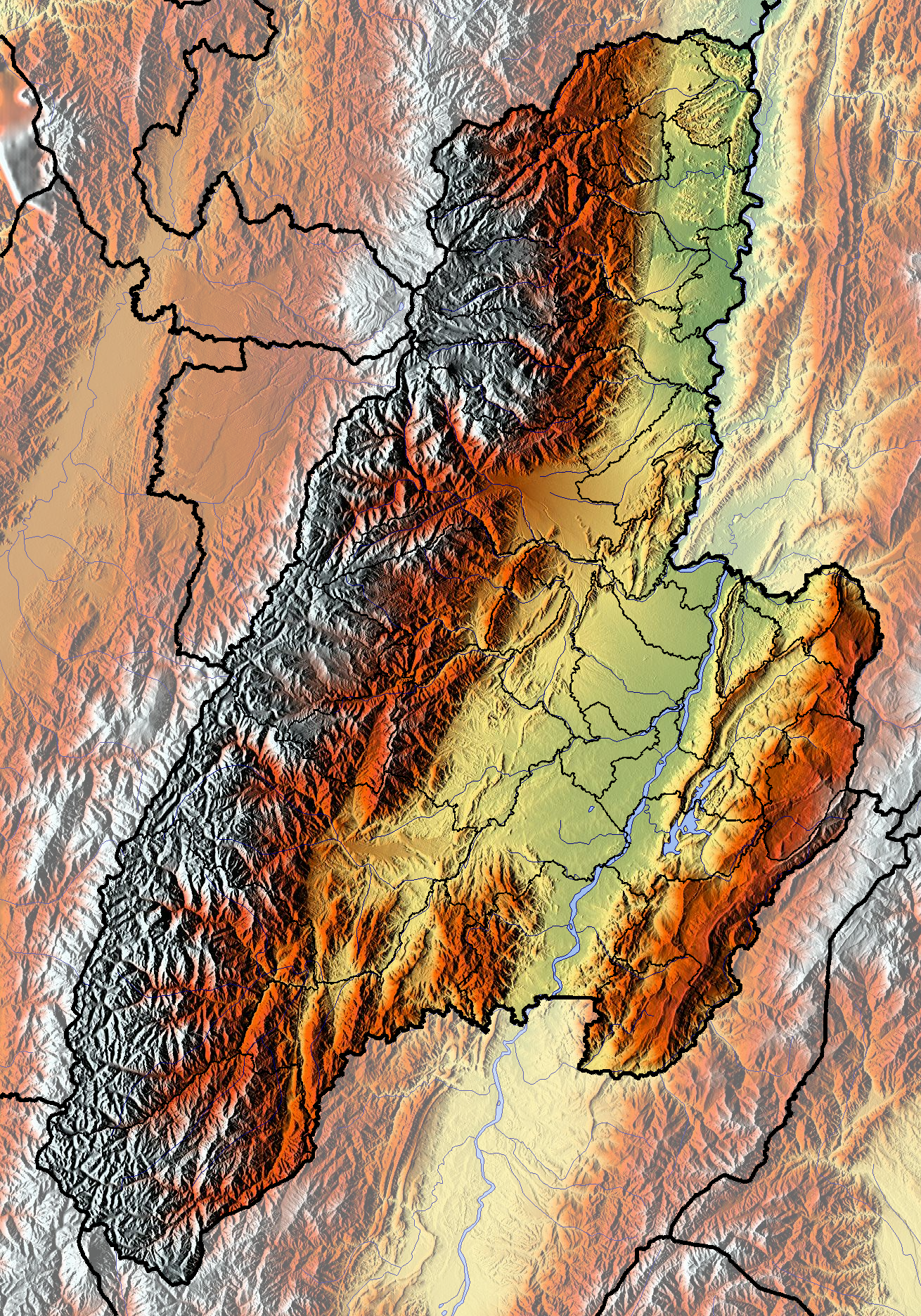
Topographical map of Tolima Department
original type locality of the Honda Group
redefined type section in Huila

Today, the sediments of the Honda Group are exposed in the Middle (Valle Medio del Magdalena, VMM) and Upper Magdalena Valley (Valle Superior del Magdalena, VSM) in an intermontane valley between the Central Ranges in the west and the Eastern Ranges in the east. The valley in between the two major orogenic chains is filled by the Magdalena River, the longest river of Colombia. The Upper Magdalena Valley geologically is subdivided into the Neiva Sub-basin with the Girardot Sub-basin of the southernmost Middle Magdalena Valley to the north, divided by the Natagaima Arch. The Neiva Sub-basin is bound by the Chusma Fault in the west and to the east by the west-verging Garzón Fault. The Mulato-Getudo Fault possibly underlies the Honda Group south of the La Miel River. The Tatacoa Desert, where the type section of the Honda Group has been redefined is an unusually dry region in Colombia, caused by a mountain induced rain-shadow effect. In Middle Miocene times, the geography was more comparable to the present eastern foothills of the Andes.

The tectonic history of the three mountain chains of Colombia, from west to east, the Western, Central and Eastern Ranges has been studied in detail. The Western and Central Ranges were the first to be exhumed in the Paleogene, with minor uplifts in the Eastern Ranges at this age. The onset of the regional uplift of the Eastern Ranges is dated around the Middle Miocene, with an increased rate of exhumation between 12 and 3 Ma. This caused a segmentation of the current Magdalena Basins and the Llanos Basin to the east, previously part of a larger foreland basin to the east of the Central Ranges. The León Formation in the Llanos Basin provides the first indication of the tectonic uplift of the Eastern Ranges, isolating the Llanos Basin from the Magdalena Valley.

== Description ==
=== Stratigraphy ===
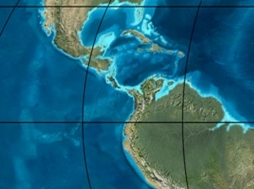
Paleogeography of Northern South America 20 Ma, by Ron Blakey

The Honda Group unconformably overlies in parts the volcanic deposits of the Prado Member, Barzalosa Formation of the Payandé Group, and in other parts the Saldaña, and Santa Teresa Formations. The unit is overlain by the Neiva Formation of the Gigante Group. The presence of a hiatus between the Honda Group and the Barzalosa Formation has been suggested. The group is characterised by two main formations; the lower La Victoria Formation and upper Villavieja Formation. Previously, the La Dorada Formation has been named as a subdivision of the Honda Group, while other authors define that unit as a member. Other names for members and formations are Cerbatana Member, also published as Cervetana Member, named after Quebrada La Cerbatana, Las Mesitas Formation, El Líbano Formation, Baraya Volcanic Member, named after Baraya, and Cerro Colorado Red Bed Member. The Perico Member of the La Dorada Formation has been made equivalent to the La Victoria Formation, as well as the El Líbano Formation.

==== La Victoria Formation ====
This formation was first defined by Guerrero in his Master's thesis (1991) and further refined in his doctoral thesis in 1993. The type locality of the La Victoria Formation has been set in the La Venta area and the formation is named after the town of La Victoria, at 15 kilometres (9.3 mi) north-northeast of the urban centre of Villavieja. The formation, restricted to the Neiva Sub-basin, consists mainly of sandstones, conglomeratic sandstones and conglomerates (75%) with intercalated claystones and siltstones (25%).

The upper part of the La Victoria Formation, underlying the Villavieja Formation, is characterised by a 45 metres (148 ft) section of conglomerates, designated the Cerbatana Member or Cerbatana Conglomerates. The conglomerate shows trough-cross lamination and imbrication of clasts in a predominantly matrix-supported sequence, with minor clast-supported sections. The base of the conglomerate marks an erosional surface into the underlying silt and clay beds. The clasts of the conglomerate are mostly milky quartz, chert and volcanic in origin, with diameters averaging around 7 centimetres (2.8 in) with a maximum of 15 centimetres (5.9 in). Conglomeratic and medium to coarse-grained sandstone banks, with a similar grain composition as the conglomerates, up to 2 metres (79 in) thick are intercalated between the conglomeratic sections. The sandstones are cemented by calcium carbonate in hardgrounds that sometimes form rounded concretions. The claystones and siltstones that are less commonly found in the La Victoria Formations range in thickness from 1 to 11 metres (3.3 to 36.1 ft) and show reddish-brown, greenish-grey and greyish colourations.

==== Villavieja Formation ====
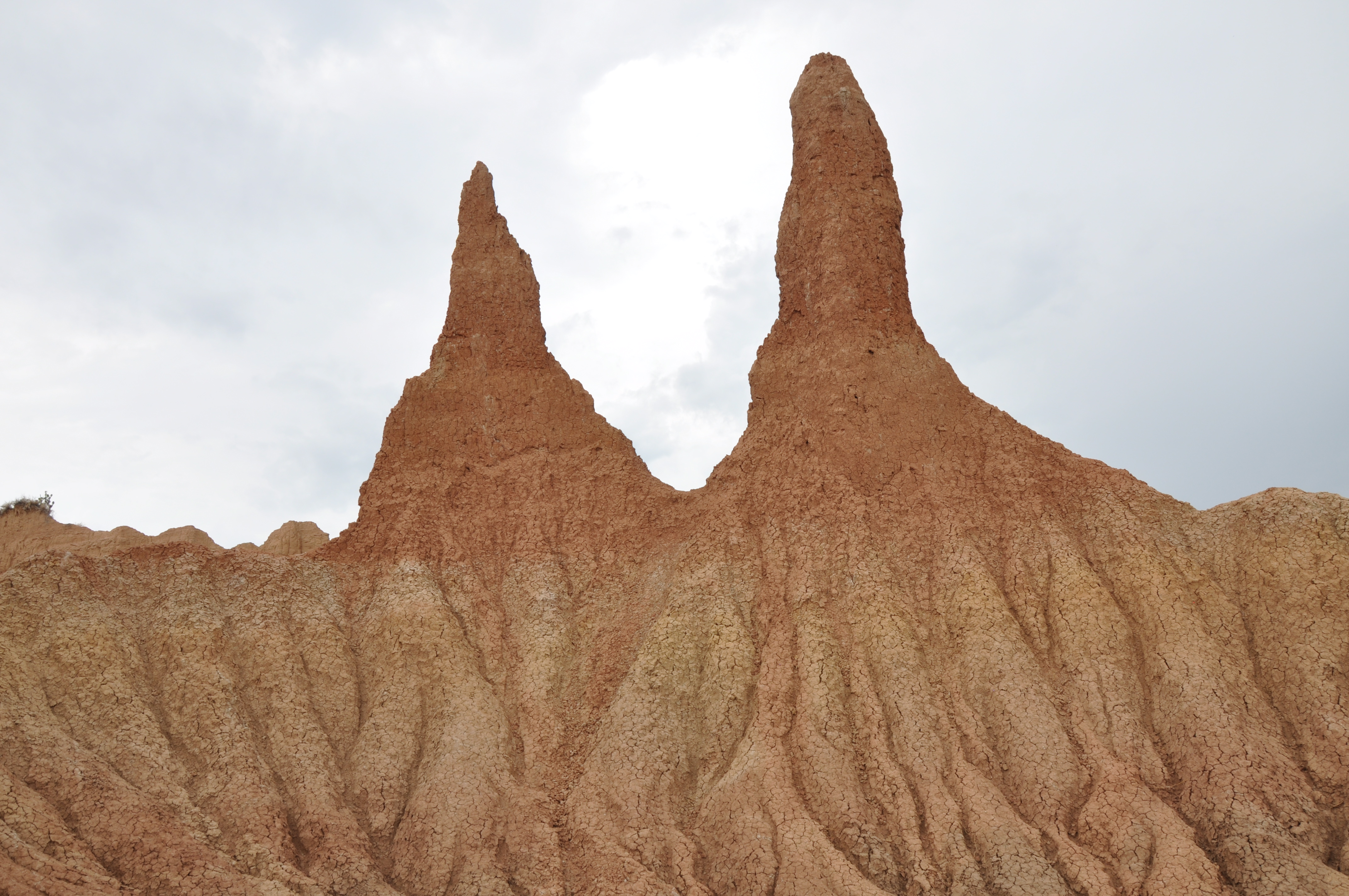
Wind erosion of the Villavieja Formation in the Tatacoa Desert

The name Villavieja Formation was first proposed by Wellman in 1968 as a member of the Honda Formation. Two years later, the author elevated the rank to a formation, as part of the Honda Group. The formation takes its name from the municipality Villavieja, Huila, 35 kilometres (22 mi) to the north-northeast of the departmental capital Neiva. The type locality is situated on the right bank of the Magdalena River in the Eastern Ranges of the Colombian Andes.

The contact between the Villavieja Formation and the underlying La Victoria Formation is concordant. The basal part of the Villavieja Formation comprises siltstones and claystones that also form the bulk of the formation with 75 percent. The remaining quarter is composed of conglomeratic sandstones. The thickness of the siltstones and claystones can exceed 8 metres (26 ft) and have interspersed fine- to medium-grained 10 centimetres (3.9 in) thin sandstone beds. The fine sediments of the Villavieja Formation are coloured greenish, reddish-brown or bluish-grey and display weathering patterns in so-called "cauliflower erosion" structures. The light grey coarser beds, up to conglomeratic sandstone size, do not exceed 2.5 metres (8.2 ft) in thickness and commonly show a lateral transition with the silt- and claystones. The Baraya Member of the Villavieja Formation shows thin yellowish and reddish brown sandstone and siltstone levels with volcaniclastic grains.

==== Honda area ====
The Honda Group extends for approximately 250 kilometres (160 mi) from the Upper to the Middle Magdalena Basin and is exposed in various locations along the right and left banks of the Magdalena River. Outcrops along the road between Girardot and Agua de Dios, Cundinamarca show a lower sequence of thick beds of greenish-yellow feldspar- and mica-rich conglomeratic sandstones, intercalated with reddish claystones and an upper level of alternating medium-to-coarse grained quartz arenites with low-angle cross stratification. These sandstones are intercalated with thick layers of fissile claystones with common calcareous sandstone concretions. Sediments of the Honda Group restrict the course of the Sumapaz River to a narrow valley, close to its confluence with the Magdalena River.

The majority of the municipality Prado, Tolima rests upon sediments of the Honda Group. In the Middle Magdalena Basin and the eastern flank of the Central and the western flank of the Eastern Ranges, the group is subdivided into the Los Limones, San Antonio and Cambrás Formations. The total thickness of these formations in the northern original type section of the Honda Group reaches 3,255 metres (10,679 ft), while a total thickness of 5,000 metres (16,000 ft) has been registered.

=== Age ===
Thanks to the fossil abundance of the Honda Group at La Venta, the geological period of the sediments has received a separate name in the South American Mammal Ages (SALMA); Laventan, ranging from 13.8 to 11.8 Ma, as the only SALMA age defined north of the equator and in Colombia. The age of the Villavieja Formation has been estimated to be between 17.0 and 12.1 Ma, while the stratigraphically lower La Victoria Formation is dated at 13.82 to 12.38 Ma (Serravallian), based on fission track and volcanic analysis and paleomagnetic research.

The Honda Group is laterally time equivalent with the lower part of the Real Formation in the central and northern Middle Magdalena Basin, the lower part of the León Formation of the Llanos Basin, the upper range of the Ciénaga de Oro Formation of the Lower Magdalena Basin, and the Caja and Diablo Formations of the Llanos foothills.

=== Depositional environment ===
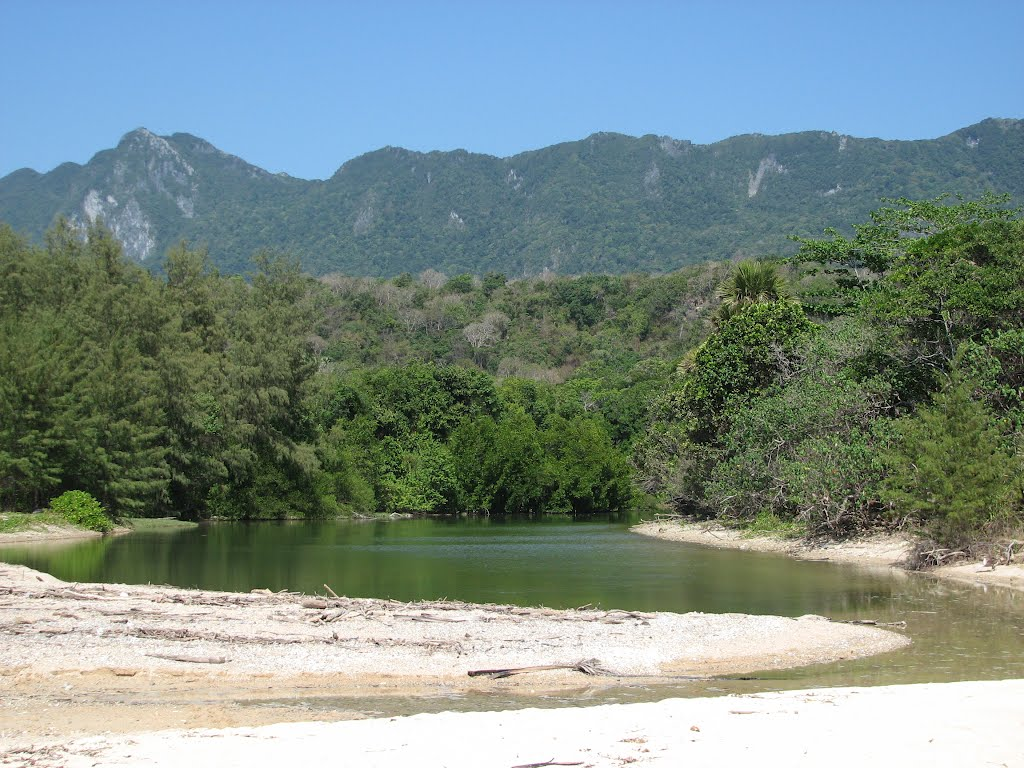
The paleogeography of the meandering and braided river sediments of the Honda Group was characterised by a more African or Asian ecosystem than that of the Neotropics

The Honda Group has been deposited in a fluvial environment, with the lower part of the La Victoria Formation in a meandering setting, while the upper part was formed in a braided river system. The paleocurrent was from the west to the east and east-southeast. The overlying predominantly finer grained Villavieja Formation was deposited in a meandering setting of a smaller size than those of the older La Victoria Formation. Paleocurrent analysis of the sediments in the Baraya and Cerro Colorado Members has revealed a similar flow direction as the La Victoria paleorivers, while the upper part of the Cerro Colorado Member shows an opposite trend to the west. The volcanic clasts of the formations have as provenance the Central Range volcanism, of which the volcaniclastics in the Honda Group mark its onset.

The depositional boundary for the Honda Group in the east is formed by the reverse Prado-Suárez and Cambrás-Salinas-Cambao Faults.

==== Paleoclimate and vegetation ====
Analysis of the "Monkey Beds" of the Honda Group, provided estimates of annual precipitation levels between 1,500 and 2,000 millimetres (59 and 79 in). Today, these levels of rainfall are associated with the transition between savanna and forest environments in lowland South America. The vegetation of the La Venta fossil assemblage was diverse due to the different biomes of the depositional environment; meandering and braided river systems in a setting at lower altitudes than the present-day elevation of more than 400 metres (1,300 ft) above mean sea level. It has been suggested that the vegetational cover of the Honda Group sedimentary sequence was not a continuous canopy forest, yet a complex pattern of different flora ecosystems. The evergreen Amazonian foothill forests of today would therefore postdate the uplift of the Eastern Ranges of the Andes. Based on vegetational and grazer diversity analysis of the La Venta fauna, it has been suggested the ecosystem resembled more that of Africa and Asia than of the modern Neotropics. Research of the paleosols found in various levels within the Honda Group suggests the presence of arid areas in close proximity to pluvial parts.

=== Petroleum geology ===
In the oil-producing Upper Magdalena Basin, the Honda Group is one of the reservoir formations, next to the more important Caballos and Monserrate Formations. Shales of the Honda Group function as seal rock for certain oilfields in the Upper Magdalena Basin. In the Tello Field in the basin, the Honda Group forms the overburden rock for the producing Monserrate reservoirs.

== Fossil content ==
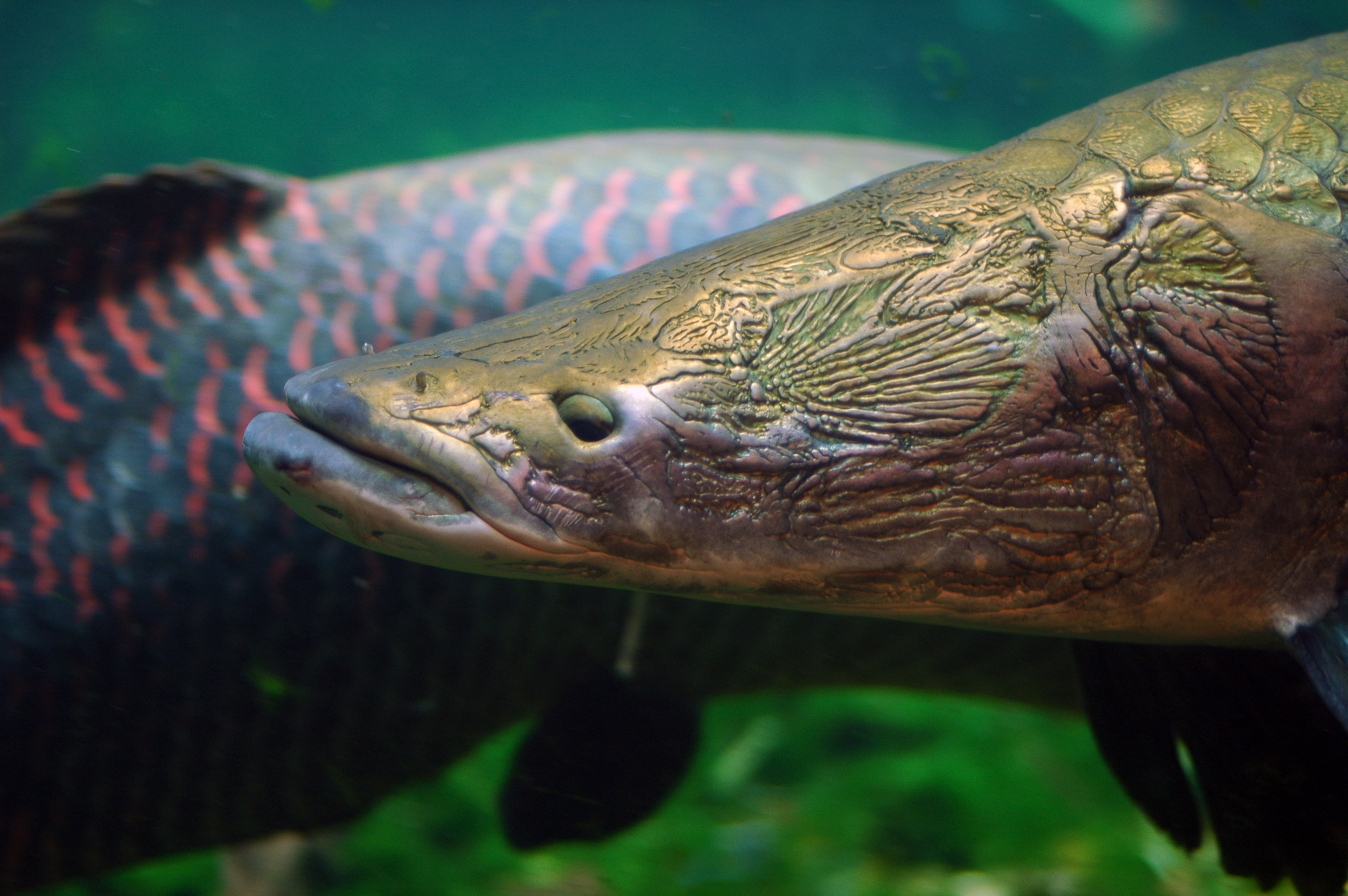
A fossil species in the genus Arapaima has been described among the many fishes from the Honda Group

The Honda Group is the richest fossiliferous stratigraphic unit of Colombia, and one of the most important for the Miocene worldwide. At the La Venta site, numerous fossils of various orders have been recovered and are found still. The site marks a unique ecosystem showing a broad range of biodiversity. La Venta is also an important site as it represents the youngest uniquely South American faunal assemblage before the Great American Biotic Interchange; the result of the uplift of the Isthmus of Panama, of which the initial phase has been dated at around 12 Ma. This led to a drastic alteration of the South American former island continental fauna. The Sparassodonta formed the dominant carnivorous mammal group in South America during most of the Cenozoic.

In South America, the carnivorous adaptive zone in terrestrial ecosystems was shared with other mammals; terror birds (Phorusrhacoidea), large crocodiles (Sebecidae), large snakes (Madtsoiidae and Boidae), and even occasionally frogs. The diversity of fossil freshwater fishes and crocodilians at La Venta is the richest assemblage of South America. Fossilised trunks of Goupioxylon sp. have been identified in the Honda Group.

The genus names Hondadelphys and Hondathentes, and the species epithets of Anadasypus hondanus and Scirrotherium hondaensis refer to the Honda Group. The giant sloth Brievabradys laventensis, the primate Stirtonia tatacoensis (originally described as Kondous laventicus), and the marsupial Micoureus laventicus were named after La Venta, while the primates Miocallicebus villaviejai and Stirtonia victoriae received their species epithets from the formations comprising the Honda Group.

=== Mammals ===
==== Chiroptera ====
Taxa	Species	Presence	Abundance	Description	Images	Notes
Diclidurus	D. sp.					
Eumops	E. sp.					
Kiotomops	K. lopezi	Screen Kyoto site	A set of teeth consists of a left upper M1	An extinct free-tailed bat		
Lophostoma	L. sp.					
Mormopterus	M. colombiensis					
Noctilio	N. albiventris			A lesser bulldog bat		
Notonycteris	N. magdalenensis					
Notonycteris	N. sucharadeus					
Palynephyllum	P. antimaster					
Potamops	P. mascahehenes					
Tonatia	T. sp.					
Thyroptera	T. lavali			A LaVal's disk-winged bat		
Thyroptera	T. robusta					
Thyroptera	T. tricolor			A Spix's disk-winged bat		

==== Metatherians ====
Didelphimorphia

Taxa	Species	Presence	Abundance	Description	Images	Notes
Thylamys	T. colombianus	Duke and Screenwash Locality	A tooth that contains an isolated right m?2	A didelphimorph marsupial that are closely related to opossums		
Thylamys	T. minutus	Duke, Screenwash, and Monkey Locality	A mandible consists of a right mandibular fragment with a posterior alveolus of m2 and complete m3-4.	A didelphimorph marsupial that are closely related to opossums		

Microbiotheria

Taxa	Species	Presence	Abundance	Description	Images	Notes
Micoureus	M. laventicus	Duke Locality	Several specimens consists of tooth and mandibles	A microbiotheria marsupial.		
Pachybiotherium	P. minor	Duke Locality	A mandible with a left mandibular fragment with roots of m2-3 and almost complete m4	A microbiotheria marsupial		

Sparassodonta

Taxa	Species	Presence	Abundance	Description	Images	Notes
Anachlysictis	A. gracilis	Villavieja Formation, La Venta	A Skull and lower jaw	A thylacosmilid sparassodont		
Dukecynus	D. magnus	Konzentrat-Lagerstätte, La Venta	A fragment skull and parts of the humerus and femur.	A sparassodont		
Hondadelphys	H. fieldsi	La Venta.	A basicranium	A sparassodont		
Lycopsis	L. longirostrus	Duke locality, La Venta.	A nearly complete skeleton	A sparassodont		
Sparassodonta indet.	Indeterminate	Duke Locality 106 La Victoria formation	A fragment of the right maxilla and partial P1	A sparassodont, stated by Goin et al. to have been large.		

Paucituberculata

Taxa	Species	Presence	Abundance	Description	Images	Notes
Hondathentes	H. cazador	Duke and Screenwash locality	A mandible consists of a fragmentary right dentary with p3-m2	A caenolestidae marsupial		
Pitheculites	P. chenche	Duke Locality	A mandible consists of a fragmentary right dentary with p3-m3	A marsupial		

==== Primates ====
Taxa	Species	Presence	Abundance	Description	Images	Notes
Aotus	A. dindensis	El Dinde site of the "Monkey Unit" and Konzentrat-Lagerstätte of La Venta	A partial skull consists of a left hemimandible with right I1-leftM3 and a left maxillary fragment preserving roots of P3-M2 and the lingual half of M3	An extinct relative of a modern Night monkey		
Cebupithecia	C. sarmientoi	"Monkey Beds", Duke Locality, and Konzentrat-Lagerstätte of La Venta	A partial skeleton	An extinct relative of a saki monkey		
Lagonimico	L. conclucatus	Konzentrat-Lagerstätte of La Venta	A nearly complete but badly crushed skull and mandible	An extinct relative of a saki monkey		
Micodon	M. kiotensis	"Monkey Beds" Locality and Konzentrat-Lagerstätte of La Venta	A tooth that contains an upper M1	An extinct relative of Callitrichidae		
Miocallicebus	M. villaviejai	"Monkey Beds" Locality and Konzentrat-Lagerstätte of La Venta	A right maxillary fragment preserving a root of M1, a complete M2, and a badly damaged M3	An extinct relative of titi monkeys		
Mohanamico	M. hershkovitzi	"Monkey Beds" Locality, UMCP Locality, and Konzentrat-Lagerstätte of La Venta	A mandible with right P2-M2, left 12, C, P3-M2 and roots for the central incisors, right canine, and both M3s	An extinct relative of an Atelids		
Neosaimiri	N. annectens	Masato Site, Duke Locality, and Konzentrat-Lagerstätte of La Venta	A fragmentary left maxilla	Relatives of squirrel monkeys		
Neosaimiri	N. fieldsi	Konzentrat-Lagerstätte of La Venta	An incomplete mandible and dentition, while later materials include not only lower but also upper dentition and deciduous teeth	Relatives of squirrel monkeys		
Nuciruptor	N. rubricae	El Cardón redbeds of the Cerro Colorado Member and Konzentrat-Lagerstätte of La Venta	A mandible, preserving the fused symphysis, right corpus and portions of the ascending ramus, left I1, and right C1–M2	Extinct relatives of a saki monkey		
Patasola	P. magdalenae	"Monkey beds" Locality, Duke Locality, and Konzentrat-Lagerstätte of La Venta	a mandible with a lower jaw that contains a dp2-4, m1-2, and p2-4 (crowns are fully developed, but cryptic)	An extinct relatives of a Callitrichidae monkey		
Stirtonia	S. tatacoensis	Duke Locality, UCMP Locality, Screen Kyoto Site, and"La Victoria" site, Konzentrat-Lagerstätte of La Venta	Several teeth, a mandible and a maxilla	An extinct relative of an Atelid, formally named Homunculus tatacoensis		
Stirtonia	S. victoriae	Duke Locality, UCMP Locality, Screen Kyoto Site, and"La Victoria" site, Konzentrat-Lagerstätte of La Venta	Several teeth, a mandible and a maxilla	An extinct relative of an Atelid, formally named Kondous laventicus)		

==== Astrapotheria ====
Taxa	Species	Presence	Abundance	Description	Images	Notes
Hilarcotherium	H. castanedaii	Malnombre Creek, Vereda Hilarco.	Partial skull and mandible, a complete left humerus, a vertebral ramus of a dorsal rib, and an associated incisor.	An astrapothere.		
Granastrapotherium	G. snorki	Pachingo farm.	Partial mandibles with dentition.	An astrapothere		
Xenastrapotherium	X. kraglievichi	La Venta	Several teeth and some partial jaws.	An astrapothere		

==== Panperissodactyla ====
Litopterna

Taxa	Species	Presence	Abundance	Description	Images	Notes
Megadolodus	M. molariformis	La Venta, Villavieja Formation.	A left preserved mandibles, limb bones, teeth, vertebrae, pelvis, and ribs	A proterotheriid litoptern.		
Mesolicaphrium	M. sanalfonense	La Victoria and Villavieja Formations	The jaw symphysis, two right mandibular rami, and teeth.	A litoptern.		
Neodolodus	N. colombianus	La Victoria and Villavieja Formations.	Right mandibular ramus, teeth, and part of the fore- and hindlimbs	A litoptern.		
Proterotheriidae	P. indet.			A litoptern.		
Theosodon	T. sp.	Duke and UCMP Locality	Several incomplete specimens	A litoptern.		
Villarroelia	V. totoyoi	La Victoria Formation.	A partial skull.	A litoptern.		

Notoungulata

Taxa	Species	Presence	Abundance	Description	Images	Notes
Cochilius	C. sp.			An interatheriid.		
Huilatherium	H. pluriplicatum	Konzentrat-Lagerstätte of La Venta.	A left maxillary deciduous teeth of a juvenile	A leontiniid.		
Leontiniidae	Loentiniidae indet			A leontiniid.		
Miocochilius	M. anomopodus	Konzentrat-Lagerstätte of La Venta	A nearly complete and numerous incomplete skeletons	An interatheriid.		
Pericotoxodon	P. platignathus	La Gaviota locality	Several fossil remains.	A toxodontid.		
Toxodontidae	Toxodontidae indet			A toxodont.		

==== Rodent ====
Taxa	Species	Presence	Abundance	Description	Images	Notes
Acarechimys	A. minutissimus					
Dolichotinae	D. sp.					
Echimyidae	?E. sp.					
Eodolichotis	E. elachys	Fish Beds, Screening Duke	A left mandible with m1-m3	A caviidae rodent		
Eodolichotis	E. maddeni	UCMP and Duke Locality	A right mandible with p4-m3	A caviidae rodent		
Microscleromys	M. cribiphilus					
Microscleromys	M. paradoxalis					
Microscleromys	M. jacobsi					
Neoreomys	N. huilensis					
Olenopsis	O. sp.					
Prodolichotis	P. guerreroi	UMCP, Toxodont, and Duke Locality	A right mandible with p4-m3	A caviidae rodent		
Prodolichotis	P. pridiana	Duke Locality, UMCP Locality, and Monkey Beds and Fish Bed, La Venta Fauna.	Multiple specimen consists of a skeleton	A caviidae rodent		
Rhodanodolichotis	Rhodanodolichotis antepridiana					
Rhodanodolichotis	R. vucetichae	IGM-DU Locality.	Holotype specimens consist of a right mandible with p4-m3	A caviidae rodent		
Ricardomys	R. longidens					
Scleromys	Scleromys colombianus					
Scleromys	S. schurmanni					
Steiromys	?S. sp.					

==== Sirenia ====
Taxa	Species	Presence	Abundance	Description	Images	Notes
Potamosiren	P. magdalenensis	Duke locality	A partial left mandible and a partial right dentary	An early manatee		

==== Xenarthra ====
Cingulata

Taxa	Species	Presence	Abundance	Description	Images	Notes
Anadasypus	A. hondanus	Duke Locality	A fossilized osteoderm.	An early relative of the Nine-banded armadillo		
Boreostemma	B. acostae		An osteoderm	A glyptodont		
Boreostemma	B. gigantea	Duke Locality	A partial skeleton	A glyptodont		
Dasypodidae	Dasypodidae indet.					
Nanoastegotherium	N. prostatum	Duke Locality		A Dasypodidae		
Neoglyptatelus	N. originalis	Duke Locality	A carapace with partial dorsal and isolated osteoderms.	A Pachyarmatheriidae		
Pedrolypeutes	P. praecursor	Duke locality				
Scirrotherium	S. hondaensis	La Venta	An Incomplete partial skull with most of the snout and partial dentition.	A Pampatheriidae.		

Pilosa

Taxa	Species	Presence	Abundance	Description	Images	Notes
Brievabradys	B. laventensis	Cerro Gordo Locality	A mandible	A mylodontid ground sloth		
Glossotheriopsis	G. pascuali					
Hapalops	H. sp.			A Megatherioidea ground sloth		
Huilabradys	H. magdaleniensis	La Tatacoa desert	A right mandibular ramus with basal fragment of the coronoid process	A Nothrotheriinae ground sloth		
Magdalenabradys	M. confusum			A mylodontid ground sloth		
Megalonychidae	Megalonychidae indet.					
Megatheriinae	Megatheriinae indet.					
Neonematherium	N. flabellatum	Duke Locality	Several specimens	A Scelidotheriidae ground sloth		
Neotamandua	N. borealis	Konzentrat-Lagerstätte of La Venta.	A set of limb elements with Radius proximal end	An early anteater.		
Nothrotheriinae	Nothrotheriinae indet.			A Nothrotheriinae ground sloth		

=== Birds ===
Taxa	Species	Presence	Abundance	Description	Images	Notes
Aramus	A. paludigrus	Konzentrat-Lagerstätte of La Venta.	A nearly complete tibiotarsus bone.	An extinct aramidae bird.		
Galbula	G. hylochoreutes	Konzentrat-Lagerstätte of La Venta	One end of the right humerus.	An extinct Jacamar bird.		
Hoazinoides	H. magdalenae	Konzentrat-Lagerstätte of La Venta	Fragmentary remains, including the back portion of the skull.	An extinct opisthocomidae bird.		
Phorusrhacinae	Indetermidate.		A nearly complete tibiotarsus bone	An extinct phorusrhacid bird		

=== Reptiles and amphibians ===
Crocodilians

Taxa	Species	Presence	Abundance	Description	Images	Notes
Alligatoridae	Indetermidate.					
Balanerodus	B. logimus					
Charactosuchus	C. fieldsi	Konzentrat-Lagerstätte, La Venta	A mandible	A gharial-like crocodilian.		
Eocaiman	E. maddeni					
Gavialis	G. sp.					
Gryposuchus	G. colombianus	Duke Locality	Multiple paratype specimen consists of multiple skulls and teeth	A gavialid crocodilian.		
Langstonia	L. huilensis	Duke locality and Monkey Beds, La Venta	Multiple paratype specimens consist of a partial skeleton and multiple teeth.	A sebecid crocodile		
Purussaurus	P. neivensis	Between Neiva and the River Bache	A partial skeleton consists of six vertebrae, ribs, and parts of maxilla and dentaries.	A giant caiman.		
Mourasuchus	M. atopus	Konzentrat-Lagerstätte, La Venta	A fragmentary cranial, mandibular, and postcranial remains.	A giant caiman.		
Sebecidae indet.	Indeterminate	La Victoria Formation		A large robust sebecid, distinct from Langstonia.		

Turtles

Taxa	Species	Presence	Abundance	Description	Images	Notes
Chelus	C. colombiana			A turtle		
Chelonoidis	C. hesterna			A tortoise		
Mesoclemmys	M. vanegasorum			A turtle		
Podocnemis	P. medemi			A turtle		
Stupendemys	S. geographica			A gigantic side necked turtle.		

Snakes

Taxa	Species	Presence	Abundance	Description	Images	Notes
Colombophis	C. portai	Los Mangos, La Venta	At least forty fragmentary vertebrae	An extinct Alethinophidia snake		
Eunectes	?E. stirtoni					

Lizards

Taxa	Species	Presence	Abundance	Description	Images	Notes
Dracaena	D. colombiana			(syn. Paradracaena colombiana)		

Frogs

Taxa	Species	Presence	Abundance	Description	Images	Notes
Rhinella	R. marina			a Cane toad		

=== Fish and crustaceans ===
Group	Fossils	Notes
Fish	Colossoma macropomum, Lepidosiren paradoxa, cf. Acanthicus, Arapaima sp., Brachyplatystoma cf. B. vaillanti, Brachyplatystoma promagdalena, cf. Corydoras sp., Hoplias sp., cf. Hoplosternum, Hydrolycus sp., Phractocephalus hemiliopterus, Serrasalmus sp., Pygocentrus sp., or Pristobrycon sp. (cf. Myletes sp.), Ariidae gen. et. sp. Incertae sedis, Characidae cf. Tetragonopterinae gen. et. sp., Cichlidae gen. et. sp. Incertae sedis, Doradidae gen. et. sp. Incertae sedis 1-3, Loricariidae gen. et. sp. Incertae sedis 1 & 2, Potamotrygonidae	
Crabs	Sylviocarcinus piriformis	

== Panorama ==
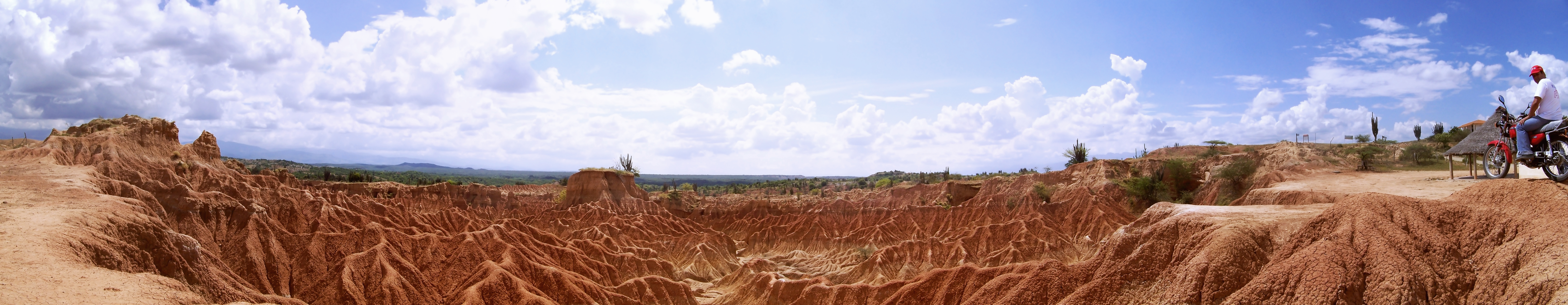
Panorama of the Tatacoa Desert, reassigned type section of the Honda Group

== Regional correlations ==
Stratigraphy of the Llanos Basin and surrounding provinces
Ma	Age	Paleomap	Regional events	Catatumbo	Cordillera	proximal Llanos	distal Llanos	Putumayo	VSM	Environments	Maximum thickness	Petroleum geology	Notes
0.01	Holocene		Holocene volcanism Seismic activity	alluvium								Overburden	
1	Pleistocene		Pleistocene volcanism Andean orogeny 3 Glaciations	Guayabo	Soatá; Sabana	Necesidad	Guayabo	Gigante Neiva		Alluvial to fluvial (Guayabo)	550 m (1,800 ft) (Guayabo)	Overburden	
2.6	Pliocene		Pliocene volcanism Andean orogeny 3 GABI	Guayabo	Subachoque	Necesidad	Guayabo	Gigante Neiva		Alluvial to fluvial (Guayabo)	550 m (1,800 ft) (Guayabo)	Overburden	
5.3	Messinian		Andean orogeny 3 Foreland	Guayabo	Marichuela	Necesidad	Guayabo	Caimán	Honda	Alluvial to fluvial (Guayabo)	550 m (1,800 ft) (Guayabo)	Overburden	
13.5	Langhian		Regional flooding	León	hiatus	Caja	León	Caimán	Honda	Lacustrine (León)	400 m (1,300 ft) (León)	Seal	
16.2	Burdigalian		Miocene inundations Andean orogeny 2	C1	hiatus	Carbonera C1		Ospina	Honda	Proximal fluvio-deltaic (C1)	850 m (2,790 ft) (Carbonera)	Reservoir	
17.3	Burdigalian		Miocene inundations Andean orogeny 2	C2	hiatus	Carbonera C2		Ospina	Honda	Distal lacustrine-deltaic (C2)	850 m (2,790 ft) (Carbonera)	Seal	
19	Burdigalian		Miocene inundations Andean orogeny 2	C3	hiatus	Carbonera C3		Ospina	Honda	Proximal fluvio-deltaic (C3)	850 m (2,790 ft) (Carbonera)	Reservoir	
21	Early Miocene		Pebas wetlands	C4	hiatus	Carbonera C4		Ospina	Barzalosa	Distal fluvio-deltaic (C4)	850 m (2,790 ft) (Carbonera)	Seal	
23	Late Oligocene		Andean orogeny 1 Foredeep	C5	hiatus	Carbonera C5		Orito		Proximal fluvio-deltaic (C5)	850 m (2,790 ft) (Carbonera)	Reservoir	
25	Late Oligocene		Andean orogeny 1 Foredeep	C6	hiatus	Carbonera C6		Orito		Distal fluvio-lacustrine (C6)	850 m (2,790 ft) (Carbonera)	Seal	
28	Early Oligocene		Andean orogeny 1 Foredeep	C7	hiatus	C7		Pepino	Gualanday	Proximal deltaic-marine (C7)	850 m (2,790 ft) (Carbonera)	Reservoir	
32	Oligo-Eocene		Andean orogeny 1 Foredeep	C8	Usme	C8	onlap	Pepino	Gualanday	Marine-deltaic (C8)	850 m (2,790 ft) (Carbonera)	Seal; Source	
35	Late Eocene		Andean orogeny 1 Foredeep	Mirador	Usme	Mirador		Pepino	Gualanday	Coastal (Mirador)	240 m (790 ft) (Mirador)	Reservoir	
40	Middle Eocene		Andean orogeny 1 Foredeep	Mirador	Regadera	Mirador		Pepino	hiatus	Coastal (Mirador)	240 m (790 ft) (Mirador)	Reservoir	
45	Middle Eocene		Andean orogeny 1 Foredeep	Mirador	Regadera	Mirador		Pepino	hiatus	Coastal (Mirador)	240 m (790 ft) (Mirador)	Reservoir	
50	Early Eocene		Andean orogeny 1 Foredeep	Socha	Regadera	Los Cuervos		Pepino	hiatus	Deltaic (Los Cuervos)	260 m (850 ft) (Los Cuervos)	Seal; Source	
55	Late Paleocene		PETM; 2000 ppm CO_{2}	Los Cuervos	Bogotá	Los Cuervos		Pepino	Gualanday	Deltaic (Los Cuervos)	260 m (850 ft) (Los Cuervos)	Seal; Source	
60	Early Paleocene		SALMA	Barco	Guaduas	Barco		Rumiyaco	Gualanday	Fluvial (Barco)	225 m (738 ft) (Barco)	Reservoir	
65	Maastrichtian		KT extinction	Catatumbo	Guadalupe			Rumiyaco	Monserrate	Deltaic-fluvial (Guadalupe)	750 m (2,460 ft) (Guadalupe)	Reservoir	
72	Campanian		End of rifting	Colón-Mito Juan	Guadalupe			Rumiyaco	Monserrate	Deltaic-fluvial (Guadalupe)	750 m (2,460 ft) (Guadalupe)	Reservoir	
83	Santonian		End of rifting	Colón-Mito Juan	Guadalupe			Villeta/Güagüaquí		Deltaic-fluvial (Guadalupe)	750 m (2,460 ft) (Guadalupe)	Reservoir	
86	Coniacian		End of rifting	Colón-Mito Juan	Guadalupe			Villeta/Güagüaquí		Deltaic-fluvial (Guadalupe)	750 m (2,460 ft) (Guadalupe)	Reservoir	
89	Turonian		Cenomanian-Turonian anoxic event	La Luna	Chipaque	Gachetá	hiatus	Villeta/Güagüaquí		Restricted marine (all)	500 m (1,600 ft) (Gachetá)	Source	
93	Cenomanian		Rift 2	La Luna	Chipaque	Gachetá	hiatus	Villeta/Güagüaquí		Restricted marine (all)	500 m (1,600 ft) (Gachetá)	Source	
100	Albian		Rift 2	La Luna	Une	Une	hiatus	Caballos		Deltaic (Une)	500 m (1,600 ft) (Une)	Reservoir	
113	Aptian		Rift 2	Capacho	Fómeque	Une	hiatus	Motema	Yaví	Open marine (Fómeque)	800 m (2,600 ft) (Fómeque)	Source (Fóm)	
125	Barremian		High biodiversity	Aguardiente	Paja	Une	hiatus	Motema	Yaví	Shallow to open marine (Paja)	940 m (3,080 ft) (Paja)	Reservoir	
129	Hauterivian		Rift 1	Tibú- Mercedes	Las Juntas	hiatus	hiatus	Motema	Yaví	Deltaic (Las Juntas)	910 m (2,990 ft) (Las Juntas)	Reservoir (LJun)	
133	Valanginian		Rift 1	Río Negro	Cáqueza; Macanal; Rosablanca	hiatus	hiatus	Motema	Yaví	Restricted marine (Macanal)	2,935 m (9,629 ft) (Macanal)	Source (Mac)	
140	Berriasian		Rift 1	Girón	Cáqueza; Macanal; Rosablanca	hiatus	hiatus	Motema	Yaví	Restricted marine (Macanal)	2,935 m (9,629 ft) (Macanal)	Source (Mac)	
145	Tithonian		Break-up of Pangea	Jordán	Arcabuco	Buenavista Batá	hiatus	Saldaña		Alluvial, fluvial (Buenavista)	110 m (360 ft) (Buenavista)	"Jurassic"	
150	Early-Mid Jurassic		Passive margin 2	La Quinta	Montebel Noreán	hiatus	hiatus	Saldaña		Coastal tuff (La Quinta)	100 m (330 ft) (La Quinta)	"Jurassic"	
201	Late Triassic		Passive margin 2	Mucuchachi	Montebel Noreán	hiatus	hiatus	Payandé				"Jurassic"	
235	Early Triassic		Pangea		hiatus	hiatus	hiatus					"Paleozoic"	
250	Permian		Pangea		hiatus	hiatus	hiatus					"Paleozoic"	
300	Late Carboniferous		Famatinian orogeny		hiatus	hiatus	hiatus		Cerro Neiva ()			"Paleozoic"	
340	Early Carboniferous		Fossil fish Romer's gap		Cuche (355-385)	Farallones ()			Cerro Neiva ()	Deltaic, estuarine (Cuche)	900 m (3,000 ft) (Cuche)	"Paleozoic"	
360	Late Devonian		Passive margin 1	Río Cachirí (360-419)	Cuche (355-385)	Farallones ()			Ambicá ()	Alluvial-fluvial-reef (Farallones)	2,400 m (7,900 ft) (Farallones)	"Paleozoic"	
390	Early Devonian		High biodiversity	Floresta (387-400) El Tíbet					Ambicá ()	Shallow marine (Floresta)	600 m (2,000 ft) (Floresta)	"Paleozoic"	
410	Late Silurian		Silurian mystery	Floresta (387-400) El Tíbet								"Paleozoic"	
425	Early Silurian		Silurian mystery	hiatus								"Paleozoic"	
440	Late Ordovician		Rich fauna in Bolivia	San Pedro (450-490)		Duda ()						"Paleozoic"	
470	Early Ordovician		First fossils	San Pedro (450-490)	Busbanzá (>470±22) Chuscales Otengá	Guape ()		Río Nevado ()	Hígado () Agua Blanca; Venado (470-475)			"Paleozoic"	
488	Late Cambrian		Regional intrusions	Chicamocha (490-515)	Quetame ()	Ariarí ()		SJ del Guaviare (490-590)	San Isidro ()			"Paleozoic"	
515	Early Cambrian		Cambrian explosion		Quetame ()			SJ del Guaviare (490-590)	San Isidro ()			"Paleozoic"	
542	Ediacaran		Break-up of Rodinia		pre-Quetame		post-Parguaza	SJ del Guaviare (490-590)	El Barro ()	Yellow: allochthonous basement (Chibcha terrane); Green: autochthonous basement (Río Negro-Juruena Province)		Basement	
600	Neoproterozoic		Cariri Velhos orogeny	Bucaramanga (600-1400)	pre-Quetame		post-Parguaza	pre-Guaviare	El Barro ()	Yellow: allochthonous basement (Chibcha terrane); Green: autochthonous basement (Río Negro-Juruena Province)		Basement	
800	Neoproterozoic		Snowball Earth	Bucaramanga (600-1400)	pre-Quetame		post-Parguaza	pre-Guaviare	El Barro ()	Yellow: allochthonous basement (Chibcha terrane); Green: autochthonous basement (Río Negro-Juruena Province)		Basement	
1000	Mesoproterozoic		Sunsás orogeny	Bucaramanga (600-1400)	pre-Quetame	Ariarí (1000)	post-Parguaza	pre-Guaviare	La Urraca (1030-1100)	Yellow: allochthonous basement (Chibcha terrane); Green: autochthonous basement (Río Negro-Juruena Province)		Basement	
1300	Mesoproterozoic		Rondônia-Juruá orogeny	Bucaramanga (600-1400)	pre-Quetame	pre-Ariarí	Parguaza (1300-1400)	pre-Guaviare	Garzón (1180-1550)	Yellow: allochthonous basement (Chibcha terrane); Green: autochthonous basement (Río Negro-Juruena Province)		Basement	
1400	Mesoproterozoic		Rondônia-Juruá orogeny	pre-Bucaramanga	pre-Quetame	pre-Ariarí		pre-Guaviare	Garzón (1180-1550)	Yellow: allochthonous basement (Chibcha terrane); Green: autochthonous basement (Río Negro-Juruena Province)		Basement	
1600	Paleoproterozoic		Rondônia-Juruá orogeny	pre-Bucaramanga	pre-Quetame	pre-Ariarí	Maimachi (1500-1700)	pre-Guaviare	pre-Garzón	Yellow: allochthonous basement (Chibcha terrane); Green: autochthonous basement (Río Negro-Juruena Province)		Basement	
1800	Paleoproterozoic		Tapajós orogeny	pre-Bucaramanga	pre-Quetame	pre-Ariarí	Mitú (1800)	pre-Guaviare	pre-Garzón	Yellow: allochthonous basement (Chibcha terrane); Green: autochthonous basement (Río Negro-Juruena Province)		Basement	
1950	Paleoproterozoic		Transamazonic orogeny	pre-Bucaramanga	pre-Quetame	pre-Ariarí	pre-Mitú	pre-Guaviare	pre-Garzón	Yellow: allochthonous basement (Chibcha terrane); Green: autochthonous basement (Río Negro-Juruena Province)		Basement	
2200	Paleoproterozoic		Columbia	pre-Bucaramanga	pre-Quetame	pre-Ariarí	pre-Mitú	pre-Guaviare	pre-Garzón	Yellow: allochthonous basement (Chibcha terrane); Green: autochthonous basement (Río Negro-Juruena Province)		Basement	
2530	Archean		Carajas-Imataca orogeny	pre-Bucaramanga	pre-Quetame	pre-Ariarí	pre-Mitú	pre-Guaviare	pre-Garzón	Yellow: allochthonous basement (Chibcha terrane); Green: autochthonous basement (Río Negro-Juruena Province)		Basement	
3100	Archean		Kenorland	pre-Bucaramanga	pre-Quetame	pre-Ariarí	pre-Mitú	pre-Guaviare	pre-Garzón	Yellow: allochthonous basement (Chibcha terrane); Green: autochthonous basement (Río Negro-Juruena Province)		Basement	

Legend

- group
- important formation
- fossiliferous formation
- minor formation
- (age in Ma)
- proximal Llanos (Medina) (Note: based on Duarte et al. (2019), García González et al. (2009), and geological report of Villavicencio)
- distal Llanos (Saltarin 1A well) (Note: based on Duarte et al. (2019) and the hydrocarbon potential evaluation performed by the UIS and ANH in 2009)

=== Laventan correlations ===
Laventan correlations in South America
Formation	Honda	Honda	Aisol	Cura-Mallín	Pisco	Ipururo	Pebas	Capadare	Urumaco	Inés	Paraná	Map
Basin	VSM	Honda	San Rafael	Caldera	Pisco	Ucayali	Amazon	Falcón		Venezuela	Paraná	Honda Group, Colombia (South America)
Country	Colombia	Bolivia	Argentina	Chile	Peru			Venezuela			Argentina	Honda Group, Colombia (South America)
Boreostemma												Honda Group, Colombia (South America)
Hapalops												Honda Group, Colombia (South America)
Miocochilius												Honda Group, Colombia (South America)
Theosodon												Honda Group, Colombia (South America)
Xenastrapotherium												Honda Group, Colombia (South America)
Mylodontidae												Honda Group, Colombia (South America)
Sparassodonta												Honda Group, Colombia (South America)
Primates												Honda Group, Colombia (South America)
Rodents												Honda Group, Colombia (South America)
Birds												Honda Group, Colombia (South America)
Terror birds												Honda Group, Colombia (South America)
Reptiles												Honda Group, Colombia (South America)
megalodon												Honda Group, Colombia (South America)
Flora												Honda Group, Colombia (South America)
Insects												Honda Group, Colombia (South America)
Environments	Fluvial			Fluvio-deltaic		Fluvio-lacustrine		Fluvio-deltaic			Fluvial	Laventan volcanoclastics Laventan fauna Laventan flora
Volcanic	Yes											Laventan volcanoclastics Laventan fauna Laventan flora

== See also ==
- Cretaceous stratigraphy of the central Colombian Eastern Ranges
- Early Cretaceous stratigraphy of Iberia

== Sources ==
=== Bibliography ===
==== General ====
- Villamil, Tomas (2012). Chronology Relative Sea Level History and a New Sequence Stratigraphic Model for Basinal Cretaceous Facies of Colombia (Report). Society for Sedimentary Geology (SEPM). pp. 161–216.
- García González, Mario; Mier Umaña, Ricardo; Cruz Guevara, Luis Enrique; Vásquez, Mauricio (2009). Informe Ejecutivo - evaluación del potencial hidrocarburífero de las cuencas colombianas (Report). Universidad Industrial de Santander. pp. 1–219.
- Barrero, Dario; Pardo, Andrés; Vargas, Carlos A.; Martínez, Juan F. (2007). Colombian Sedimentary Basins: Nomenclature, Boundaries and Petroleum Geology, a New Proposal (Report). ANH. pp. 1–92.
- Cooper, M.A.; Addison, F.T.; Álvarez, R.; Coral, M.; Graham, R.H.; Hayward, A.B.; Howe, S.; Martínez, J.; Naar, J.; Penas, R; Pulham, A.J.; Taborda, A. (1995). "Basin development and tectonic history of the Llanos Basin, Eastern Cordillera and Middle Magdalena Valley, Colombia". AAPG Bulletin. 79: 1421–1443.

==== Llanos Basin ====
- Duarte, Edward; Bayona, German; Jaramillo, Carlos; Parra, Mauricio; Romero, Ingrid; Mora, Josué Alejandro (2017). "Identificación de los máximos eventos de inundación marina Miocenos y su uso en la correlación y análisis de la cuenca de antepaís de los Llanos Orientales, Colombia". Boletín de Geología. 39: 19–40. doi:10.18273/revbol.v39n1-2017001.
- Villamizar, Fanny Johanna; Castillo, Luis Antonio (2016). "Análisis sismoestratigráfico y secuencial del sector suroeste de la cuenca de los Llanos Orientales (Colombia)". Boletín de Geología. 38 (2): 55–69. doi:10.18273/revbol.v38n3-2016004.
- Bayona, G.; Cortés, M.; Jaramillo, C.; Ojeda, G.; Aristizabal, J.; Reyes, A. (2007). "La deformación pre-Neogéna de la Cordillera Oriental definida por depósitos de antepaís". Boletín de Geología. 29: 51–59.
- González Uribe, G.; García Bautista, D.; Mantilla Figueroa, L.; Rodríguez Rincón, J. (2007). "Hidrodinámica e hidrogeoquímica del Piedemonte Llanero Colombiano: Hipótesis de rutas de migración a partir de técnicas hidrogeológicas". Boletín de Geología. 29: 75–84.
- González Iregui, Humberto; Duque Pineda, Jorge; Rincón, Juan Pablo; Castro Rodríguez, Wilmar; Suárez Gómez, Alejandro; Peláez Mejía, Carolina; Vélez Giraldo, Wilson; Dávila Bolívar, Cristina (2015). Geología de la Plancha 173 - Támara - 1:100,000 (PDF) (Report). Servicio Geológico Colombiano. pp. 1–139.
- Unión Temporal, G&H (2015). Geología de la Plancha 177 - Río Agua Clara - 1:100,000 (Report). Servicio Geológico Colombiano. pp. 1–108.
- Pulido, Orlando; Gómez, Luz Stella (2001). Geología de la Plancha 266 - Villavicencio - 1:100,000 (Report). INGEOMINAS. pp. 1–52.
- Unión Temporal, G&H (2015). Geología de la Plancha 304 - La Uribe - 1:100,000 (Report). Servicio Geológico Colombiano. pp. 1–102.
- Unión Temporal, G&H (2015). Geología de la Plancha 348 - Serranía de la Macarena - 1:100,000 (Report). Servicio Geológico Colombiano. pp. 1–101.
- Unión Temporal, G&H (2011). Geología de la Plancha 350 - San José del Guaviare - 1:100,000 (Report). Servicio Geológico Colombiano. pp. 1–165.

==== Basement ====
- Manosalva Sánchez, Sandra Rocío; Naranjo Merchán, Wilson Enario; Ríos Reyes, Carlos Alberto; Amorocho Parra, Ricardo; Castellanos Alarcón, Oscar Mauricio (2017). "Estudio petrogenetico de las rocas metamorficas del Macizo de Floresta, Cordillera Oriental, Andes Colombianos". Boletín de Geología. 39: 83–103. doi:10.18273/revbol.v39n1-2017004.
- Bonilla, Amed; Frantz, José Carlos; Charão Marques, Juliana; Cramer, Thomas; Franco, José Alejandro; Amaya, Zeze (2016). "Magmatismo rapakivi en la cuenca media del río Inírida, departamento de Guainía, Colombia". Boletín de Geología. 38: 17–32. doi:10.18273/revbol.v38n1-2016001.
- Toro Toro, Luz Mary; Moreno Sánchez, Mario; Gómez Cruz, Arley (2014). "Metagabro del Ariari, Plutonismo MORB, Cordillera Oriental de Colombia". Boletín de Geología. 36: 15–24.
- Arango Mejía, María Isabel; Zapata García, Gilberto; Martens, Uwe (2012). "Caracterización petrográfica, geoquímica y edad de la Sienita Nefelínica de San José del Guaviare". Boletín de Geología. 34: 15–26.

===== 'Paleozoic' =====
- Mantilla Figueroa, Luis C.; García Ramírez, Carlos A.; Valencia, Víctor A. (2016). "Propuesta de escisión de la denominada 'Formación Silgará' (Macizo de Santander, Colombia), a partir de edades U-Pb en circones detríticos". Boletín de Geología. 38: 33–50. doi:10.18273/revbol.v38n1-2016002.
- Moreno Sánchez, Mario; Jesus Gómez Cruz, Arley de; Castillo González, Hardany (2008). "Graptolitos del Ordovícico y geología de los afloramientos del Río Venado (norte del Departamento del Huila)" (PDF). Boletín de Geología. 30: 9–19.
- Borrero, C.; Sarmiento, G.N.; Gómez González, C.; Gutiérrez Marco, J.C. (2007). "Los Conodontos de la Formación El Hígado y su contribución al conocimiento del metamorfismo y la paleogeografía del Ordovícico en la Cordillera Central Colombiana". Boletín de Geología. 29: 39–46.
- Villarroel A., C.; Macia S., C.; Brieva B, J. (1997). "Formación Venado, nueva unidad litoestratigráfica del Ordovícico colombiano". Geología Colombiana. 22: 41–49.

===== 'Jurassic' =====
- Correa Martínez, Ana María; Rodríguez, Gabriel; Arango, María Isabel; Zapata García, Gilberto (2019). "Petrografía, geoquímica y geocronología U-Pb de las rocas volcánicas y piroclásticas de la Formación Noreán al NW del Macizo de Santander, Colombia". Boletín de Geología. 41: 29–54.

==== Maps ====
National

- Mapa de Tierras (PDF) (Report). ANH. 2017. p. 1.
- Gómez Tapias, Jorge; Montes Ramírez, Nohora E.; Almanza Meléndez, María F.; Alcárcel Gutiérrez, Fernando A.; Madrid Montoya, César A.; Diederix, Hans (2015). Geological Map of Colombia (Report). Servicio Geológico Colombiano. pp. 1–212.

Regional

- Reyes, Germán; Cardozo, Ana Milena (1999). Mapa Geológico de Arauca 1:250,000 (Map). INGEOMINAS. p. 1.
- Acosta, Jorge; Ulloa, Carlos; García, Pilar; Solano, Orlando (1999). Mapa Geológico de Cundinamarca (Map). INGEOMINAS. p. 1.
- Rodríguez, Antonio José (2002). Mapa Geológico del Meta 1:500,000 (Map). INGEOMINAS. p. 1.

==== Llanos Basin ====
- Fúquen, Jaime; Ceballos, Leonardo; Pedraza, Andrea; Marín, Edwin (2010). Plancha 99 - Villa del Rosario - 1:100,000 (PDF) (Map). INGEOMINAS. p. 1.
- Royero, José María; Zambrano, J.; Daconte, Rommel; Mendoza, H.; Vargas, Rodrigo (1999). Plancha 111 - Toledo - 1:100,000 (Map). INGEOMINAS. p. 1.
- López, Carolina; Dávila, Camilo; González, Francisco; Parra, Eduardo; Chaquea, Claudia; Ojeda, Carolina; Q., Carlos; Espinel, Valentina; Lancheros, José A. (2011). Plancha 139 - Betoyes - 1:100,000 (Map). INGEOMINAS. p. 1.
- López, Carolina; Dávila, Camilo; González, Francisco; Parra, Eduardo; Chaquea, Claudia; Ojeda, Carolina; Q., Carlos; Espinel, Valentina; Lancheros, José A. (2011). Plancha 155 - Puerto Rondón - 1:100,000 (Map). INGEOMINAS. p. 1.
- Unión Temporal, G&H (2015). Plancha 177 - Río Agua Clara - 1:100,000 (Map). Servicio Geológico Colombiano. p. 1.
- Ulloa, Carlos E; Escovar, Ricardo; Pacheco, Adolfo H. (2009). Plancha 230 - Monterrey - 1:100,000 (Map). INGEOMINAS. p. 1.
- Pulido, Orlando; Gómez, Luz Stella; Marín, Pedro (1998). Plancha 266 - Villavicencio - 1:100,000 (Map). INGEOMINAS. p. 1.
- Duarte, Rafael; Moreno, Mauricio; Morales, Carlos Julio; Villegas, Henry; Alvarado, Sonia; Téllez, Milena; Pacheco, Sonia; Rojas, Nadia (2010). Plancha 267 - Pachaquiaro - 1:100,000 (Map). INGEOMINAS. p. 1.
- Unión Temporal, G&H (2015). Plancha 284 - Santana - 1:100,000 (PDF) (Map). Servicio Geológico Colombiano. p. 1.
- Unión Temporal, G&H (2015). Plancha 348 - Serranía de la Macarena - 1:100,000 (PDF) (Map). Servicio Geológico Colombiano. p. 1.
- Unión Temporal, G&H (2015). Plancha 350 - San José del Guaviare - 1:100,000 (Map). Servicio Geológico Colombiano. p. 1.

==== Catatumbo Basin ====
- Daconte, Rommel; Salinas, Rosalba; Royero, José María; Clavijo, Jairo; Arias, Alfonso; Carvajal, Luz S.; López, Martín E.; Angarita, Leonidas; Mendoza, Hernando (2009). Plancha 66 - Miraflores - 1:100,000 (Map). INGEOMINAS. p. 1.
- Daconte, Rommel; Salinas, Rosalba (1980). Plancha 76 - Ocaña - 1:100,000 (Map). INGEOMINAS. p. 1.
- Vargas, Rodrigo; Arias, Alfonso (1981). Plancha 86 - Ábrego - 1:100,000 (Map). INGEOMINAS. p. 1.

==== Eastern Cordillera ====
- García, Helbert; Jiménez, Giovanny (2016). "Structural analysis of the Zipaquirá Anticline (Eastern Cordillera, Colombia)". Boletín de Ciencias de la Tierra, Universidad Nacional de Colombia. 39 (39): 21–32. doi:10.15446/rbct.n39.50333.
- Montaña Cárdenas, Jorge Hernando (2015). Análisis de deformaciones y modelo estructural del frente de deformación del Piedemonte Llanero de la Cordillera Oriental de Colombia (PDF) (MSc thesis). Universidad Nacional de Colombia. pp. 1–57.
- Caballero, Victor M.; Reyes Harker, Andrés; Mora, Andrés; Ruiz, Carlos F.; Parra, Felipe de la (2013). Cenozoic Paleogeographic Reconstruction of the Foreland System in Colombia and Implications on the Petroleum Systems of the Llanos Basin (Report). AAPG International Conference, Cartagena, Colombia. pp. 1–24.
- Schütz, Christian (2012). Combined structural and Petroleum Systems Modeling in the Eastern Cordillera Basin, Colombia (MSc thesis). Rheinisch-Westfälische Technische Hochschule Aachen & Instituto Colombiano del Petróleo. pp. 1–161.
- Pinto Valderrama, Jorge Eduardo; Mora Ortiz, José Pedro; Reátiga Tarazona, Gloria; Rey Pilonieta, Jorge Alberto; Toloza Hormiga, Silvia Johana; Torres Coronado, Diego Andrés; Vargas Mojica, David Ricardo; Zafra Manrique, Cristian Julián (2010). Geología del Piedemonte Llanero en la Cordillera Oriental, departamentos de Arauca y Casanare (PDF) (Report). INGEOMINAS & Universidad Industrial de Santander. pp. 1–64. Archived from the original (PDF) on 2017-08-15.
- Cortés, Martín; García, Diego; Bayona, Germán; Blanco, Yolima (2009). Timing of oil generation in the Eastern flank of the Eastern Cordillera of Colombia based on kinematic models; implications in the Llanos Foothills and Foreland charge (Report). Asociación Colombiana de Geólogos y Geofisicos del Petróleo (ACGGP). pp. 1–8.
- Parra, Mauricio; Mora, Andrés; Sobel, Edward R.; Strecker, Manfred R.; Jaramillo, Carlos; O'Sullivan, Paul B.; González, Román (2008). Cenozoic Orogenic Growth of the North Andes: Shortening and Exhumation Histories of the Eastern Cordillera of Colombia (Report). AAPG Annual Convention, San Antonio, Texas. pp. 1–27.
- Sarmiento Rojas, L.F.; Van Wees, J.D.; Cloetingh, S. (2006). "Mesozoic transtensional basin history of the Eastern Cordillera, Colombian Andes: Inferences from tectonic models". Journal of South American Earth Sciences. 21 (4). Elsevier: 383–411. Bibcode:2006JSAES..21..383S. doi:10.1016/j.jsames.2006.07.003.
- Cartografía geológica cuenca Cordillera Oriental - Sector Soapaga (PDF) (Report). ANH. 2006. pp. 1–239. Archived from the original (PDF) on 2017-08-16.
- Rodríguez Parra, Antonio José; Solano Silva, Orlando (2000). Mapa Geológico del Departamento de Boyacá - 1:250,000 - Memoria explicativa (PDF) (Report). INGEOMINAS. pp. 1–120.
- Acosta Garay, Jorge; Ulloa Melo, Carlos E. (2001). Geología de la Plancha 208 Villeta - 1:100,000 (PDF) (Report). INGEOMINAS. pp. 1–84. Archived from the original (PDF) on 2017-03-24.
- Reyes, Germán; Montoya, Diana; Terraza, Roberto; Fuquen, Jaime; Mayorga, Marcela; Gaona, Tatiana; Etayo, Fernando (2008). Geología del cinturón esmeraldífero oriental Planchas 210, 228, 229 (Report). INGEOMINAS. pp. 1−126.
- Acosta Garay, Jorge; Ulloa Melo, Carlos E. (2001). Geología de la Plancha 227 - La Mesa - 1:100,000 (Report). INGEOMINAS. pp. 1–80.
- Terraza, Roberto; Montoya, Diana; Reyes, Germán; Moreno, Giovanni; Fúquen, Jaime; Torres Jaimes, Eliana; López Cardona, Myriam; Nivia Guevara, Álvaro; Etayo Serna, Fernando (2013). Geología de la Plancha 229 - Gachalá - 1:100,000 (PDF) (Report). Servicio Geológico Colombiano. pp. 1–296.
- Patiño, Alejandro; Fuquen, Jaime; Ramos, Julián; Pedraza, Andrea; Ceballos, Leonardo; Pinzón, Lyda; Jerónimo, Yadira; Álvarez, Leidy; Torres, Andrea (2011). Cartografía geológica de la Plancha 247 - Cáqueza - 1:100,000 (PDF) (Report). INGEOMINAS. pp. 1–100. Archived from the original (PDF) on 2017-08-15.
- Daconte B., Rommel; Salinas E, Rosalba (1982). Plancha 122 - Río Cobugón - 1:100,000 (PDF) (Map). INGEOMINAS. p. 1.
- Vargas, Rodrigo; Arias, Alfonso; Jaramillo, Luis; Tellez, Noel (1984). Plancha 136 - Málaga - 1:100,000 (Map). INGEOMINAS. p. 1.
- Ulloa, Carlos E.; Rodríguez, Erasmo; Escovar, Ricardo (1998). Plancha 192 - Laguna de Tota - 1:100,000 (Map). INGEOMINAS. p. 1.
- Terraza, Roberto; Moreno, Giovanni; Buitrago, José A.; Pérez, Adrián; Montoya, Diana María (2010). Plancha 210 - Guateque - 1:100,000 (Map). INGEOMINAS. p. 1.
- Buitrago, José Alberto; Terraza M., Roberto; Etayo, Fernando (1998). Plancha 228 - Santafé de Bogotá Noreste - 1:100,000 (Map). INGEOMINAS. p. 1.
- Unión Temporal, G&H (2015). Plancha 284 - Santana - 1:100,000 (PDF) (Map). Servicio Geológico Colombiano. p. 1.

==== Upper Magdalena Valley (VSM) ====
- Fuquen M., Jaime Alberto; Osorno M, José Fernando (2002). Geología de la Plancha 303 - Colombia - 1:100,000 (Report). INGEOMINAS. pp. 1–88.
- Rodríguez, Gabriel; et al. (2002). Geología de las Planchas 367 Gigante, 368 San Vicente del Caguán, 389 Timaná, 390 Puerto Rico, 391 Lusitania (parte noroccidental) y 414 El Doncello (Report). INGEOMINAS. pp. 1–164.
- Acosta, Jorge; Calcedo, Juan Carlos; Ulloa, Carlos (1999). Plancha 265 - Icononzo - 1:100,000 (Map). INGEOMINAS. p. 1.
- Carvajal, Cesar; Fuquen, Jaime; Gómez, Luis (1993). Plancha 282 - Chaparral - 1:100,000 (Map). INGEOMINAS. p. 1.
- Cossio, Ubaldo; Rodríguez, Gabriel; Rodríguez, Miguel (1995). Plancha 283 - Purificación - 1:100,000 (Map). INGEOMINAS. p. 1.
- Fuquen, Jaime; Rodríguez, Gabriel; Cossio, Ubaldo; Núñez, Alberto (1993). Plancha 302 - Aipe - 1:100,000 (Map). INGEOMINAS. p. 1.
- Acosta, Jorge; Caro, Pablo; Fuquen, Jaime; Osorno, José (2002). Plancha 303 - Colombia - 1:100,000 (Map). INGEOMINAS. p. 1.
- Ferreira, Paulina; Núñez, Alberto; Rodríguez, Miguel (1998). Plancha 323 - Neiva - 1:100,000 (Map). INGEOMINAS. p. 1.
- Marquínez, Germán; Morales, C.; Núñez, Alberto (1999). Plancha 344 - Tesalia - 1:100,000 (Map). INGEOMINAS. p. 1.
- Velandia, F.; Morales, C.J.; Caicedo, J.C.; Núñez, Alberto (1999). Plancha 345 - Campoalegre - 1:100,000 (Map). INGEOMINAS. p. 1.
- Unión Temporal, G&H (2015). Plancha 347 - Espelda Nuevo - 1:100,000 (PDF) (Map). Servicio Geológico Colombiano. p. 1.
- Rodríguez, Gabriel; Ferreira, Paulina; Velandia, Francisco; Núñez, Alberto (1998). Plancha 366 - Garzón - 1:100,000 (Map). INGEOMINAS. p. 1.
- Rodríguez, Gabriel; Zapata, Gilberto; Velázquez, M. (2003). Plancha 367 - Gigante - 1:100,000 (Map). INGEOMINAS. p. 1.

==== Caguán-Putumayo Basin ====
- Núñez Tello, Alberto (2003). Cartografía geológica de las zonas Andina Sur y Garzón-Quetame (Colombia) - Memoria explicativa de las planchas 411 La Cruz, 412 San Juan de Villalobos, 430 Mocoa, 431 Piamonte, 448 Monopamba, 449 Orito y 465 Churuyaco (Report). INGEOMINAS. pp. 1–298.
- Rodríguez, Gabriel; Zapata, Gilberto; Velázquez, M. (2003). Plancha 368 - San Vicente del Caguán - 1:100,000 (Map). INGEOMINAS. p. 1.
- Unión Temporal, G&H (2015). Plancha 369 - Los Pozos - 1:100,000 (PDF) (Map). Servicio Geológico Colombiano. p. 1.
- Cárdenas, Jorge; Fuquen, Jaime; Núñez, Alberto (2002). Plancha 388 - Pitalito - 1:100,000 (Map). INGEOMINAS. p. 1.
- Rodríguez, Gabriel; Zapata, Gilberto; Velázquez, M. (2003). Plancha 389 - Timaná - 1:100,000 (Map). INGEOMINAS. p. 1.
- Rodríguez, Gabriel; Zapata, Gilberto; Velázquez, M. (2003). Plancha 391 - Lusitania - 1:100,000 (Map). INGEOMINAS. p. 1.
- Núñez, Alberto; Gómez, Jorge (2002). Plancha 412 - San Juan de Villalobos - 1:100,000 (Map). INGEOMINAS. p. 1.
- Rodríguez, Gabriel; Zapata, Gilberto; Velázquez, M. (2003). Plancha 414 - El Doncello - 1:100,000 (Map). INGEOMINAS. p. 1.
- Unión Temporal, G&H (2015). Plancha 415 - Ríonegro - 1:100,000 (PDF) (Map). Servicio Geológico Colombiano. p. 1.
- Núñez, Alberto; Gómez, Jorge (2002). Plancha 430 - Mocoa - 1:100,000 (Map). INGEOMINAS. p. 1.
- Núñez, Alberto; Gómez, Jorge (2002). Plancha 431 - Piamonte - 1:100,000 (Map). INGEOMINAS. p. 1.
- Núñez, Alberto; Gómez, Jorge (2002). Plancha 448 - Monopamba - 1:100,000 (Map). INGEOMINAS. p. 1.
- Núñez, Alberto; Gómez, Jorge (2002). Plancha 449 - Orito - 1:100,000 (Map). INGEOMINAS. p. 1.

== See also ==
- Geology of the Eastern Hills
- Geology of the Ocetá Páramo
- Geology of the Altiplano Cundiboyacense
- Bogotá, Cerrejón, Floresta, Paja Formations
