= Ricardomys =

Ricardomys Temporal range: Burdigalian–Serravallian

Scientific classification
- Kingdom: Animalia
- Phylum: Chordata
- Class: Mammalia
- Order: Rodentia
- Family: Echimyidae
- Subfamily: †Adelphomyinae
- Genus: †Ricardomys; Walton, 1990

Type species
- Ricardomys longidens Walton, 1990

Other species
- Ricardomys antiqua Arnal et al., 2026

Extinct genus of caviomorph rodent

Ricardomys is an extinct genus of caviomorph rodent that lived in South America from the Burdigalian to the Serravallian stages of the Miocene epoch.

== Distribution ==
The type species, Ricardomys longidens, inhabited the palaeoenvironments of the Villavieja Formation of Colombia and the Ipururo Formation of Peru. The species Ricardomys antiqua is known from the Bala Formation of Peru.
