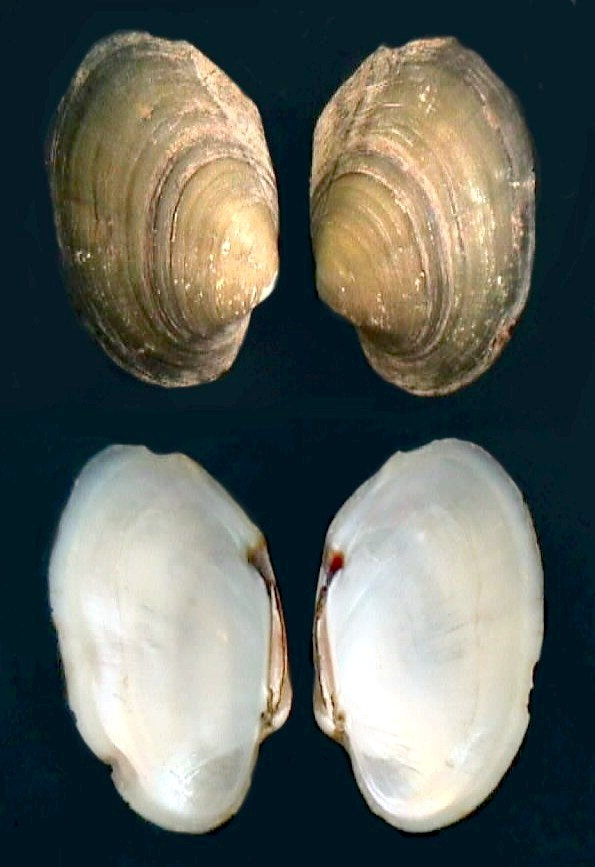
- Anodontites trapesialis

Scientific classification
- Domain: Eukaryota
- Kingdom: Animalia
- Phylum: Mollusca
- Class: Bivalvia
- Order: Unionida
- Family: Mycetopodidae
- Subfamily: Anodontitinae
- Genus: Anodontites; Bruguière 1792

Species
- see text

= Anodontites =

Anodontites Temporal range: Late Cretaceous–present 70.6–0 Ma

Genus of bivalves

Anodontites is a genus of freshwater mussels, aquatic bivalve mollusks in the family Mycetopodidae. Anodontites are present in South and Middle America, as far north as Mexico.

== Species ==
The table below lists extant species:

Scientific name	Authority	Distribution
A. aroana	H.B. Baker 1930	
A. carinata	Dunker 1858	Widespread distribution from Guyana west to the Magdalena River, Colombia
A. colombiensis	Marshall 1922	Known from the Colorado River and adjacent streams in northern Colombia
A. crispata	Bruguière 1792	Widespread in tropical South America, north of the Paraná Basin
A. cylindracea	Lea 1838	Chiapas and Veracruz, Mexico
A. depexus	Martens 1900	Guatemala
A. elongata	Swainson 1823	Amazon Basin in Brazil, Peru and Colombia; the Magdalena River in Colombia; and the upper Paraguay in the Paraná Basin
A. ferrarisii	d'Orbigny 1835	Lower Paraná system
A. guanarensis	Marshall 1927	Venezuela
A. iheringi	Clessin 1882	Paraná and adjacent coastal streams in Brazil
A. inaequivalva	Lea 1868	Lake Nicaragua
A. infossus	H.B. Baker 1930	Northern Venezuela
A. leotaudi	Guppy 1866	Venezuela and Trinidad
A. lucida	d'Orbigny 1835	Paraná and adjacent coastal streams in Brazil, Uruguay and Argentina
A. moricandii	Lea 1860	Lower São Francisco and Atlantic streams as far south as Rio de Janeiro, Brazil
A. obtusa	Spix & Wagner 1827	Disjunct distribution in the Tapajos River in the Amazon Basin, the São Francisco River and adjacent coastal streams, and the Piracicaba in the upper Paraná basin
A. patagonica	Lamarck 1819	Widespread in the Paraná and adjacent coastal basins.
A. pittieri	Marshall 1922	Venezuela
A. schomburgianus	Sowerby 1870	Described from British Guyana
A. solenidea	Sowerby 1867	From the São Francisco south to the Paraná in Brazil, Paraguay, and Argentina
A. tehuantepecensis	Crosse & Fischer 1893	Mexico and Central America
A. tenebricosa	Lea 1834	Widespread upper Amazon, coastal streams of southern Brazil and the Paraná Basin, South America
A. tortilis	Lea 1852	Guyanas, Venezuela and Colombia, north to Costa Rica
A. trapesialis	Lamarck 1819	Widespread in South America from the Paraná System through the Amazon Basin and northern drainages, and north to Mexico
A. trapezea	Spix & Wagner 1827	Paraná and Rio São Francisco basins, west to the upper Amazon
A. trigona	Spix & Wagner 1827	

Four species are known from fossils (three exclusively so):

Species	Authors	Formation	Country	Refs
†Anodontites batesi	Woodward 1871	Pebas Formation	Peru	
†Anodontites capax	Conrad 1874	Pebas Formation	Peru	
†Anodontites laciranus	De Porta 1966	Santa Teresa Formation	Colombia	
Anodontites trapesialis	Lamarck 1819	Solimões Formation	Brazil	
