= Boletín de Geología =

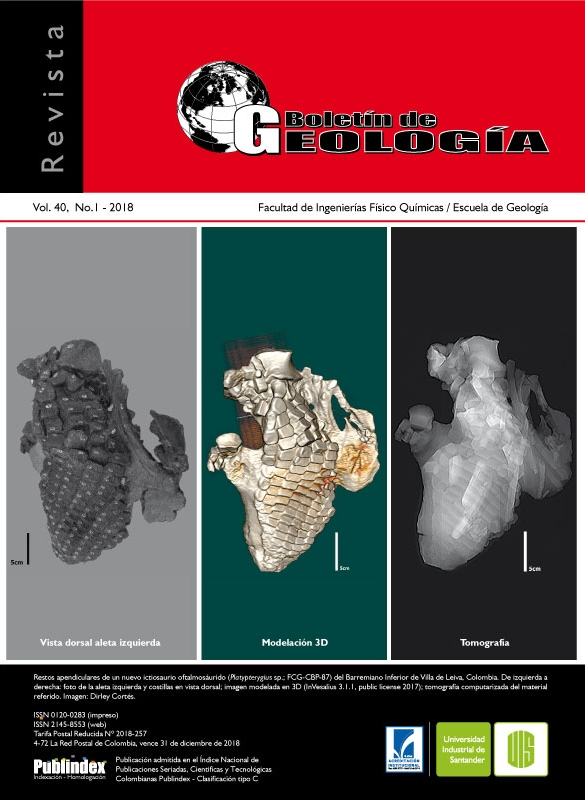
- Discipline: Geology, geophysics, geochemistry, paleontology
- Language: English, Portuguese, Spanish
- Edited by: Luis Carlos Mantilla Figueroa

Publication details
- History: 1958-recent
- Publisher: Industrial University of Santander (Colombia)
- Frequency: Quarterly
- Open access: Yes
- License: CC-BY 4.0
- Impact factor: 0.160 (2017)

Standard abbreviations
- ISO 4: Bol. Geol.

Indexing
- ISSN: 0120-0283 (print); 2145-8553 (web)

Links
- Journal homepage

Boletín de Geología is a quarterly peer-reviewed open access scientific journal published by the Industrial University of Santander. The journal covers the geosciences, including geology, geophysics, geochemistry, and paleontology. It was established in 1958.

== Abstracting and indexing ==
The journal is abstracted and indexed in Redalyc, SciELO, Latindex, Publindex, GeoRef, and Geoscience e-Journals.

== See also ==
- Geology of Colombia
