= Balanerodus =

Balanerodus Temporal range: Mid Miocene (Friasian-Laventan) ~16.3–11.8 Ma

Scientific classification
- Kingdom: Animalia
- Phylum: Chordata
- Class: Reptilia
- Clade: Archosauria
- Order: Crocodilia
- Superfamily: Alligatoroidea
- Family: Alligatoridae
- Genus: †Balanerodus; Langston, 1965

Type species
- †Balanerodus logimus Langston, 1965

Extinct genus of reptiles

Balanerodus is an extinct monospecific genus of alligatorid crocodylian. Fossils have been found from the Fitzcarrald Arch in the Peruvian Amazon and the La Victoria Formation of the Honda Group in Colombia and date back to the Friasian and Laventan regional South American land mammal ages of the Middle Miocene.

== Description ==
It was an atypical crocodilian with mysterious acorn-like teeth and co-existed with many other crocodilians, which were more diverse at the time period than they are today, including terrestrial predatory sebecid Langstonia, the massive Purussaurus, and flat headed duck-like Mourasuchus. Its teeth and the diversity of crocodilians suggest it occupied a different niche than they did. Another animal with acorn-like teeth is the Vaquita.

A 2015 study found teeth indistinguishable from those of Balanerodus among a set of Purussaurus teeth, suggesting that the two genera might be synonymous.
