= Colombian Geological Survey =

Agency of the Colombian government

- Servicio Geológico Colombiano
- Official logo

Agency overview
- Formed: 22 December 1916; 109 years ago (as the National Scientific Commission)
- Jurisdiction: Colombia
- Headquarters: Bogotá, Colombia
- Annual budget: $195 billion pesos (FY2010)
- Agency executive: Managing Director; Secretary General
- Parent agency: Ministry of Mines and Energy
- Website: SGC.gov.co

The Colombian Geological Survey (CGS) (Spanish: Servicio Geológico Colombiano; formerly known as INGEOMINAS) is a scientific agency of the Colombian government in charge of contributing to the socioeconomic development of the nation through research in basic and applied geosciences of the subsoil, the potential of its resources, evaluating and monitoring threats of geological origin, managing the geoscientific knowledge of the nation, and studying the nuclear and radioactive elements in Colombia.

== History ==
The CGS was initially created as the National Scientific Commission (Spanish: Comisión Científica Nacional) by the Congress of Colombia on December 22, 1916, with the mission of mapping the geological resources of the nation and exploring the national territory in search of mineral deposits.

Following a series of earthquakes throughout the nation in the early 1920s, the eruption of the Galeras volcano in 1925, and the growing mining and petroleum industry, the Colombian government decided to re-organize the National Scientific Commission in 1938 and place it under the supervision of the newly established Ministry of Mines and Energy as the National Geological Survey (Spanish: Servicio Geológico Nacional).

In 1944, the CGS published the first official geological map of Colombia, and established the José Royo y Gómez Geological Museum to showcase the different types of rocks, minerals, and fossils found throughout the first research expeditions carried out in the country.

In 1968 the Instituto Nacional de Investigaciones Geológico-Mineras (INGEOMINAS) was formed by combining the Geological Service, the Mining Inventory, and the National Chemical Laboratory.

In 2004, the national government merged MINERCOL, a public for profit organization in charge of exploiting mineral resources in the country, to consolidate the Colombian Geological Survey into a scientific for research only government agency.

In 2011 INGEOMINAS leaves all matters of mining to newly formed Agencia Nacional de Minería and attains the name Servicio Geológico Colombiano (SGC).

== Volcanic and seismic monitoring sites ==
The Colombian Geological Survey operates a network of volcanic and seismic observatories throughout the Colombia which are located in Manizales, Popayán, and Pasto.

=== Volcanic and Seismic Observatory of Manizales ===
The volcanic and seismic observatory in Manizales was established in 1985, post the Armero tragedy, to monitor the Nevado del Ruiz volcano.

=== Volcanic and Seismic Observatory of Popayán ===
The volcanic and seismic observatory in Popayán was established in 1990 to monitor the Nevado del Huila volcano complex. Today, the observatory also constantly monitors the Puracé and Sotará volcanoes.

=== Volcanic and Seismic Observatory of Pasto ===
The volcanic and seismic observatory in Pasto was established to monitor the Galeras volcano following its reactivation in 1989. Today, the observatory also monitors the Chiles and the Cerro Negro de Mayasquer volcanoes on the international border between Colombia and Ecuador, and the Azufral, Cumbal, and Doña Juana volcanoes in the Department of Nariño.

== José Royo y Gómez Geological Museum ==
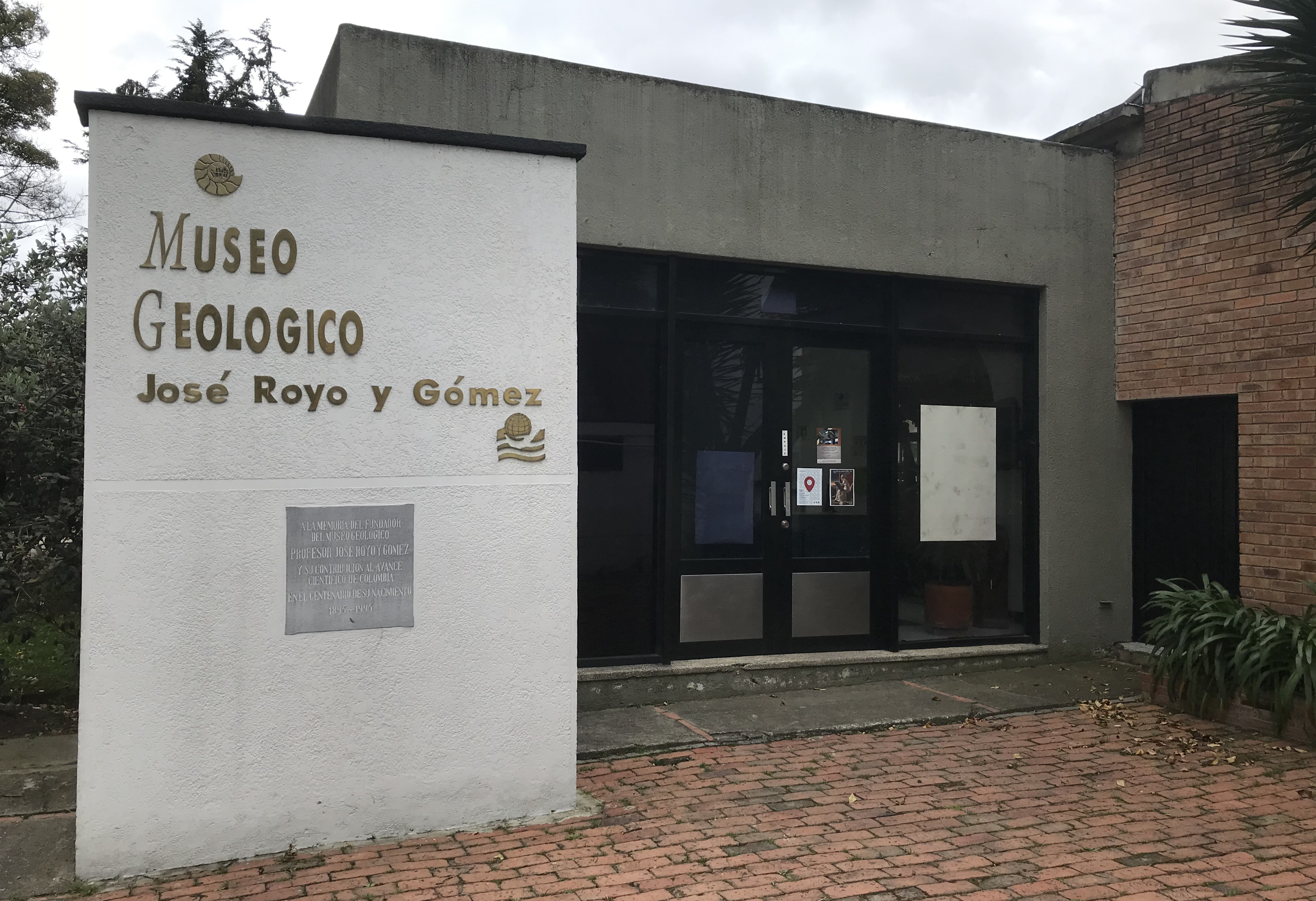
José Royo y Gómez Geological Museum in Bogotá, Colombia.

The Colombian Geological Survey runs a network of museums located in Bogotá, Medellín, and Cali which are named after José Royo y Gómez, a Spaniard geologist who was forced into exile in Colombia during the Spanish Civil War. His contribution to the study of geology in Colombia can be traced back all the way to the days of the foundation of the geological survey as he was called to take part of the newly created Servicio Geológico Nacional de Colombia just nine days after his arrival to the country. Throughout José Royo y Gómez' time at the SGNC, he directed various commissions where he continued his investigations and promoting the study of natural sciences in Colombia.
