= Industrial University of Santander =

University in Colombia

Coordinates: 7°8′26.51″N 73°7′15.48″W

Universidad Industrial de Santander
- Other name: UIS
- Motto: Construimos Futuro
- Motto in English: "Making our future"
- Type: Public
- Established: 1948
- Rector: Hernán Porras Díaz
- Students: ~22,000 (2010)
- Location: Bucaramanga, Santander, Colombia
- Campus: CUP 337,000 m^{2} (83 acres) Faculty of Health 9,500 m^{2} (2.3 acres) Bucarica Building Urban
- Colors: Green and White
- Website: www.uis.edu.co

The Industrial University of Santander (Spanish: Universidad Industrial de Santander), abbreviated in Spanish with the acronym UIS, is a public university, based in a coeducational, and research model. The university serves the Santander Department, being the main campus located in the city of Bucaramanga, Santander, Colombia. The university also has satellite campuses across the department in the cities of Barrancabermeja, Barbosa, Málaga, Piedecuesta, Socorro.

UIS is the largest higher education institution and is regarded as one of the leading multidisciplinary research universities in Colombia by student population, research groups, academic output, technological development, and number of publications. UIS is one of the most selective Colombian universities and have been ranked as the top university in the North region of Colombia. The university was created by ordinance No. 83 of June 22, 1944, by the Departmental Assembly, and began its operation in March 1948. The university offers many degrees at undergraduate and postgraduate levels, with 124 academic programs, which includes 21 master, 9 medical residency programs, and 6 doctorates.

== History ==
The university was created by the municipal ordinance No. 83 of 22 June 1944, during the industrial boom that took place in Colombia after the II world war. After the accomplishment of several legislative and administrative developments, the university officially began its educational function the 1st of March, 1948 with 20 students. Initially only engineering degrees of Electronics, Mechanical and Chemical were offered. Later during the 1950s and 1960s were added the petroleum and metallurgical engineering as well as the school of health sciences with programs in medicine, nursing, bacteriology, nutrition, physical therapy and social work. It is the latter, which influenced the change from the European Educational Administrative Model to the American Model, causing student protests and social discomfort due to the ideas brought by the Cuban Revolution Spirit in 1959 and the criticism of the bipartisan pact of the National Front. By the 1970s, the university expanded its educative offerings to the engineering degree of systems, languages teaching, biology and Mathematics. Finally, after nearly two decades, in September 1994, the faculty of law and political science were added to become the first law program offered by a public educational institution in the north-eastern region of Colombia.

== Organization ==
Its main campus, known also as Campus Universitario Principal (Main University Campus, CUP), is located in the northeast part of the city and hosts the faculties of Sciences, Engineering, and Humanities. It also possesses a second campus, which hosts the faculty of Health in close proximity to the University Hospital of Santander, and a building known as the Sede Bucarica, which is a national heritage monument.

== Academics ==
=== Rankings ===
UIS is ranked consistently as one of the best universities in Colombia and Latin America.

University rankings

Global – Overall
- QS World: 850 (2018)

Regional – Overall
- QS Latin America: 84

== Research ==
UIS has one of the higher academic outputs from Colombian universities. Since its foundation had developed innovative research in the field of engineering, basic sciences, and medicine. The Colombian Institute of Petroleum and the National Center for Research in agrarian industry and tropical medicine are part of the university. Additionally, the university has 94 research laboratories, has its own press publisher (PublicacionesUIS), and it is the main academic center associated with the Colombian Petroleum Company ECOPETROL.

== Gallery ==
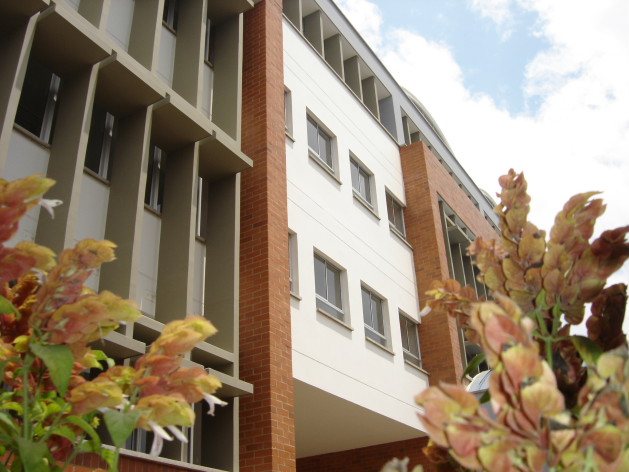
Social Science Faculty

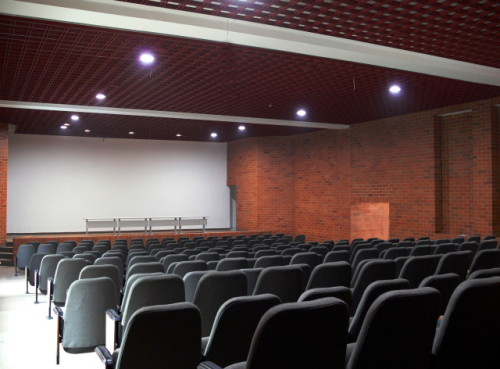
"Agora" Auditorium

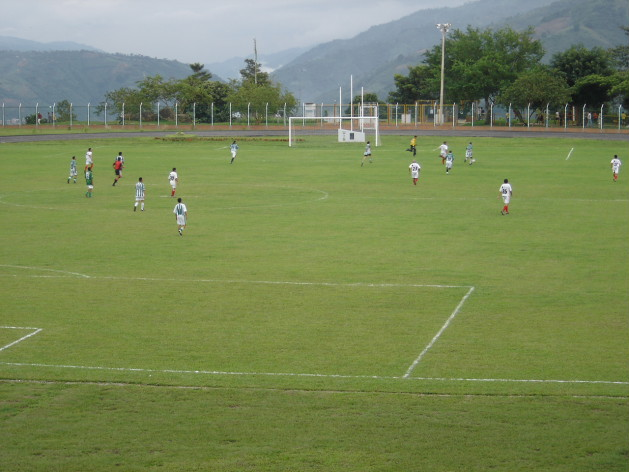
Soccer field

== See also ==
- List of universities in Colombia
