= List of primates of Colombia =

The primates of Colombia include 41 extant species in 13 genera and five families. Additionally, 12 fossil species in 10 genera and five families have been identified in Colombia, mainly at the La Venta Lagerstätte of the Honda Group, mostly from the so-called "Monkey Unit", "Monkey Beds" or "Monkey Locality", the richest site for fossil primates in South America. As of 2013, of the 30 fossil primate species found in South America dating to the Late Oligocene (26 Ma) to the Pleistocene, twelve are described from the Honda Group. The genera Branisella, Caipora, Carlocebus, Chilecebus, Dolichocebus, Homunculus, Killikaike, Mazzonicebus, Proteropithecia, Protopithecus, Soriacebus, Szalatavus and Tremacebus have been discovered in Argentina, Bolivia, Brazil, Chile, Ecuador and Peru and are not known from Colombia. Additionally, Antillothrix, Insulacebus (both Hispaniola), Paralouatta (Cuba) and Xenothrix (Jamaica) were restricted to the Caribbean. The discovery of Perupithecus, described in 2015 from the Late Eocene (35-36 Ma) Santa Rosa fauna in the Yahuarango Formation of the Peruvian Amazon, pushes back the evolutionary lineage of New World primates.

== Extant primates ==
Common name	Scientific name	Image	Distribution & habitat	Range map	Remarks	Notes
Aotidae - night monkeys
Brumback's night monkey	Aotus brumbacki		Orinoco region		ssp. of A. lemurinus ?; Vulnerable	
Gray-bellied night monkey	Aotus lemurinus		Tropical Andes		Vulnerable	
Gray-handed night monkey	Aotus griseimembra		Northern Colombia east of Sinú River		ssp. of A. lemurinus ?; Vulnerable	
Hernández-Camacho's night monkey	Aotus jorgehernandezi		West slope of Central Andes (Quindío, Risaralda)		Tatamá (West Andes) ?	
Panamanian night monkey	Aotus zonalis		Chocó lowlands		ssp. of A. lemurinus ?	
Spix's night monkey	Aotus vociferans		Amazon region			
Atelidae - howler, spider, and wooly monkeys
Black-headed spider monkey	Ateles fusciceps		West slope of West Andes, Pacific lowlands		Critically endangered	
Brown spider monkey	Ateles hybridus		Magdalena Valley, Sierra Nevada de Santa Marta, Serranía del Perijá		Critically endangered	
Brown woolly monkey	Lagothrix lagotricha		Amazon region		Vulnerable	
Colombian woolly monkey	Lagothrix lugens		East Andes foothills, Serranía de la Macarena, Magdalena Valley, Serranía de San Lucas		Critically endangered; Endemic ?	
Geoffroy's spider monkey	Ateles geoffroyi		Possibly extreme northern Chocó to Baudó Mountains		Endangered	
Juruá red howler	Alouatta juara		Amazon region		may be subspecies of A. seniculus	
Mantled howler	Alouatta palliata		Pacific lowlands, western Caribbean lowlands			
Ursine howler	Alouatta arctoidea		Northern Orinoco region		may be subspecies of A. seniculus	
Venezuelan red howler	Alouatta seniculus		Throughout except Pacific & La Guajira			
White-bellied spider monkey	Ateles belzebuth		Parts of Amazon region, Serranía de la Macarena, foothills of East Andes		Endangered	
Callitrichidae - marmosets & tamarins
Black-mantled tamarin	Saguinus nigricollis		Amazon region			
Brown-mantled tamarin	Saguinus fuscicollis		Amazon region		Sympatric with pygmy marmoset	
Cotton-top tamarin	Saguinus oedipus		Caribbean region, PNN Tayrona		Critically endangered; Endemic	
Geoffroy's tamarin	Saguinus geoffroyi		Chocó lowlands and foothill forest			
Goeldi's marmoset	Callimico goeldii		Amazon region		Vulnerable	
Graells's tamarin	Saguinus graellsi		Amazon region		ssp. of S. nigricollis ?; Near threatened	
Mottle-faced tamarin	Saguinus inustus		Amazon region			
Pygmy marmoset	Cebuella pygmaea		Amazon region			
White-footed tamarin	Saguinus leucopus		Northern Colombia; dry and humid forest		Allopatry from S. oedipus; Endangered; Endemic	
Cebidae - capuchins & squirrel monkeys
Colombian white-faced capuchin	Cebus capucinus		Pacific lowlands, Gorgona Island		Map shows combined range of Colombian and Panamanian white-faced capuchins; Colombian white-faced capuchin range shown in red	
Common squirrel monkey	Saimiri sciureus		Amazon region		Subsequent taxonomic research restricts S. sciureus to Brazil and the Guianas; replaced in Colombia by S. cassiquiarensis	
Humboldt's squirrel monkey	Saimiri cassiquiarensis		Amazon region			
Large-headed capuchin	Sapajus macrocephalus		Amazon region		may be ssp. of S. apella	
Marañón white-fronted capuchin	Cebus yuracus		Southern Colombia			
Río Cesar white-fronted capuchin	Cebus cesarae		Río Cesar valley		Endemic	
Santa Marta white-fronted capuchin	Cebus malitiosus		Sierra Nevada de Santa Marta		Endangered; Endemic	
Sierra de Perijá white-fronted capuchin	Cebus leucocephalus		Northern Colombia			
Tufted capuchin	Cebus apella		Amazon region, Orinoco region			
Varied white-fronted capuchin	Cebus versicolor		Río Magdalena Valley		Endangered; Endemic	
Humboldt's white-fronted capuchin	Cebus albifrons		Amazon region		Several white-fronted capuchin species were formerly considered subspecies of C. albifrons	
Pitheciidae - titis, sakis & uakaris
Black titi	Callicebus lugens		Orinoco & Amazon lowlands, between Caquetá & Tomo Rivers			
Caquetá titi	Callicebus caquetensis		Caquetá		Critically endangered; Endemic geographic range of just about 100 km^{2} (39 sq mi), actually occupies only about 10 km^{2} (3.9 sq mi) within that range	
Collared titi	Callicebus torquatus		Amazon region			
Colombian black-handed titi	Callicebus medemi		Amazon region, between Caquetá & Putumayo Rivers		Vulnerable; Endemic	
Golden-backed uakari	Cacajao melanocephalus		Between Caquetá & Guaviare Rivers, to Serranía de la Macarena			
Lucifer titi	Callicebus lucifer		Amazon region, between Caquetá & Putumayo Rivers			
Monk saki	Pithecia monachus		Amazon region, south of Caquetá River			
Ornate titi	Callicebus ornatus		East Andean foothills to Serranía de la Macarena		Vulnerable; Endemic	
White-tailed titi	Callicebus discolor		Amazon region		Vulnerable	

== Fossil primates ==
Age	Formation	Family	Genus	Species	Notes
Mid Miocene (Laventan)	Honda Group	Aotidae	Aotus	A. dindensis	
Mid Miocene (Laventan)	Honda Group	Atelidae	Miocallicebus	M. villaviejai	
Mid Miocene (Laventan)	Honda Group	Atelidae	Stirtonia	S. tatacoensis (syn. Kondous laventicus)	
Mid Miocene (Laventan)	Honda Group	Atelidae	Stirtonia	S. victoriae	
Mid Miocene (Laventan)	Honda Group	Callitrichidae	Lagonimico	L. conclucatus	
Mid Miocene (Laventan)	Honda Group	Callitrichidae	Micodon	M. kiotensis	
Mid Miocene (Laventan)	Honda Group	Callitrichidae	Patasola	P. magdalenae	
Mid Miocene (Laventan)	Honda Group	Cebidae	Saimiri	S. annectens (syn. Laventiana annectens, Neosaimiri annectens)	
Mid Miocene (Laventan)	Honda Group	Cebidae	Saimiri	S. fieldsi (syn. Neosaimiri fieldsi)	
Mid Miocene (Laventan)	Honda Group	Pitheciidae	Cebupithecia	C. sarmientoi	
Mid Miocene (Laventan)	Honda Group	Pitheciidae	Nuciruptor	N. rubricae	
Mid Miocene (Laventan)	Honda Group	incertae sedis (Callitrichidae, Pitheciidae or Aotidae)	Mohanamico	M. hershkovitzi	

== See also ==
- List of Central American monkey species
- List of mammals of Colombia
- Biodiversity of Colombia
- Fauna of Colombia
