= List of fossil primates of South America =

Locations of primate fossil finds in South America and the Caribbean
Divisaderan
Deseadan
Hemingfordian & Colhuehuapian
Santacrucian-Friasian
Laventan
Huayquerian
Pleistocene
Holocene

Various fossil primates have been found in South America and adjacent regions such as Panama and the Caribbean. Presently, 78 species of New World monkeys have been registered in South America. Around the middle of the Cenozoic, approximately 34 million years ago, two types of mammals appeared for the first time in South America: rodents and primates. Both of these groups had already been inhabiting other continents for millions of years and they simply arrived in South America rather than originated there. Analyses of evolutionary relationships have shown that their closest relatives were living in Africa at the time. Therefore, the most likely explanation is that they somehow crossed the Atlantic Ocean, which was less wide than today, landed in South America, and founded new populations of rodents and primates.

The first South American primates gave rise to an impressive evolutionary radiation: more than 120 species in five families. These primates are known as platyrrhine (flat-nosed) primates and are closely related to Old World apes and monkeys (catarrhine primates). Platyrrhines include some of the most popular and acrobatic monkeys such as spider monkeys (Ateles) and capuchins (Cebus), both of which have grasping (prehensile) tails that can be used as a fifth limb. Platyrrhines also include a wide variety of colorful tamarins and marmosets (family Callitrichidae). The platyrrhine primate fossil record is relatively sparse, quite unlike that of caviomorph rodents.

The presently oldest New World monkey is Perupithecus ucayaliensis from Amazonian Peru, described in 2015. A 2017 study of the fossils estimated the body mass for the various fossil primate species. However, the Ucayalipithecus who might have rafted across the Atlantic between ~35–32 million years ago, are nested within the Parapithecoidea from the Eocene of Afro-Arabia.

== List of fossil primates of South America ==
Note: some authors, among others Fossilworks, consider Killikaike synonymous with Homunculus and Szalatavus with Branisella, while other researchers consider the genera as different.
The Panamanian and Caribbean fossil primates have been included for completeness.

Age (SALMA/NALMA)	Formation	Country	Family	Subfamily	Genus	Species bold is type	Estimated body mass	Notes
Divisaderan	Yahuarango Fm.	Peru	incertae sedis	incertae sedis	Perupithecus	P. ucayaliensis	400 g (0.88 lb)	
Deseadan	Chambira Fm.	Peru	incertae sedis	incertae sedis	Canaanimico	C. amazonensis	2,000 g (4.4 lb)	
Deseadan	Salla Fm.	Bolivia	incertae sedis	incertae sedis	Branisella	B. boliviana	1,000 g (2.2 lb)	
Deseadan	Salla Fm.	Bolivia	incertae sedis	incertae sedis	Szalatavus	S. attricuspis	550 g (1.21 lb)	
Hemingfordian	Lagunitas Fm.	Cuba	Atelidae	Alouattinae	Paralouatta	P. marianae	4,708 g (10.38 lb)	
Hemingfordian	Las Cascadas Fm.	Panama	Cebidae	stem cebid	Panamacebus	P. transitus	2,700 g (6.0 lb)	
Colhuehuapian	Sarmiento Fm.	Argentina	Cebidae	Saimirinae	Dolichocebus	D. gaimanensis	2,700 g (6.0 lb)	
Colhuehuapian	Sarmiento Fm.	Argentina	Aotidae	stem aotid	Tremacebus	T. harringtoni	1,800 g (4.0 lb)	
Colhuehuapian	Sarmiento Fm.	Argentina	Pitheciidae	Pitheciinae	Mazzonicebus	M. almendrae	1,602 g (3.532 lb)	
Colhuehuapian	Abanico Fm.	Chile	Atelidae	stem atelid	Chilecebus	C. carrascoensis	1,000 g (2.2 lb)	
Santacrucian	Santa Cruz Fm.	Argentina	Cebidae	Cebinae	Killikaike	K. blakei	2,000 g (4.4 lb)	
Santacrucian	Santa Cruz Fm.	Argentina	Pitheciidae	Callicebinae	Homunculus	H. patagonicus	2,700 g (6.0 lb)	
Santacrucian	Pinturas Fm.	Argentina	Pitheciidae	Callicebinae	Carlocebus	C. carmenensis	3,500 g (7.7 lb)	
Santacrucian	Pinturas Fm.	Argentina	Pitheciidae	Callicebinae	Carlocebus	C. intermedius		
Santacrucian	Pinturas Fm.	Argentina	Pitheciidae	Pitheciinae	Soriacebus	S. adrianae		
Santacrucian	Pinturas Fm.	Argentina	Pitheciidae	Pitheciinae	Soriacebus	S. ameghinorum	1,483 g (3.269 lb)	
Friasian	Collón Cura Fm.	Argentina	Pitheciidae	Pitheciinae	Proteropithecia	P. neuquenensis	1,600 g (3.5 lb)	
Laventan	Honda Gp.	Colombia	Atelidae	Alouattinae	Stirtonia	S. tatacoensis	5,513 g (12.154 lb)	
Laventan	Honda Gp.	Colombia	Atelidae	Alouattinae	Stirtonia	S. victoriae	10,000 g (22 lb)	
Laventan	Honda Gp.	Colombia	Cebidae	Saimirinae	Saimiri	S. annectens	605 g (1.334 lb)	
Laventan	Honda Gp.	Colombia	Cebidae	Saimirinae	Saimiri	S. fieldsi	768 g (1.693 lb)	
Laventan	Honda Gp.	Colombia	Cebidae	Saimirinae	Patasola	P. magdalenae	480 g (1.06 lb)	
Laventan	Honda Gp.	Colombia	incertae sedis	incerstae sedis	Lagonimico	L. conclucatus	595 g (1.312 lb)	
Laventan	Honda Gp.	Colombia	Callitrichidae	-	Micodon	M. kiotensis	400 g (0.88 lb)	
Laventan	Honda Gp.	Colombia	Aotidae	-	Aotus	A. dindensis	1,054 g (2.324 lb)	
Laventan	Honda Gp.	Colombia	Pitheciidae	Callicebinae	Miocallicebus	M. villaviejai	1,500 g (3.3 lb)	
Laventan	Honda Gp.	Colombia	Pitheciidae	Pitheciinae	Cebupithecia	C. sarmientoi	1,602 g (3.532 lb)	
Laventan	Honda Gp.	Colombia	Pitheciidae	Pitheciinae	Nuciruptor	N. rubricae	2,000 g (4.4 lb)	
Laventan	Honda Gp.	Colombia	Atelidae	stem atelid	Mohanamico	M. hershkovitzi	1,000 g (2.2 lb)	
Huayquerian	Solimões Fm.	Brazil	Atelidae	Atelinae	Solimoea	S. acrensis	8,000 g (18 lb)	
Huayquerian	Solimões Fm.	Brazil; Bolivia	Cebidae	Cebinae	Acrecebus	A. fraileyi	12,000 g (26 lb)	
Pleistocene	Cueva del Mono	Cuba	Atelidae	Alouattinae	Paralouatta	P. varonai	8,444 g (18.616 lb)	
Pleistocene		Brazil	Atelidae	Alouattinae	Cartelles	C. coimbrafilhoi	23,500 g (51.8 lb)	
Pleistocene		Brazil	Atelidae	Alouattinae	Caipora	C. bambuiorum	24,000 g (53 lb)	
Pleistocene		Brazil	Atelidae	Alouattinae	Protopithecus	P. bonaeriensis	22,600 g (49.8 lb)	
Pleistocene		Brazil	Atelidae	Alouattinae	Protopithecus	P. brasiliensis	22,600 g (49.8 lb)	
Pleistocene		Brazil	Atelidae	Alouattinae	Alouatta	A. mauroi		
Holocene	La Jeringa Cave	Dominican Republic	Pitheciidae	Pitheciinae	Antillothrix	A. bernensis	1,500 g (3.3 lb)	
Holocene	Long Mile Cave	Jamaica	Pitheciidae	Pitheciinae	Xenothrix	X. mcgregori	5,720 g (12.61 lb)	
Holocene	Trouing Jérémie	Haiti	Pitheciidae	Pitheciinae	Insulacebus	I. toussentiana	4,805 g (10.593 lb)	

== See also ==
- Evolution of primates
- List of fossil primates
- List of gomphothere fossils in South America
- List of prehistoric mammals
- List of New World monkey species
  - List of primates of Central America
  - List of primates of Colombia
  - List of primates of Peru
