= Aotus dindensis =

Aotus dindensis Temporal range: Middle Miocene (Laventan) ~13.8–11.8 Ma

Scientific classification
- Kingdom: Animalia
- Phylum: Chordata
- Class: Mammalia
- Order: Primates
- Suborder: Haplorhini
- Family: Aotidae
- Genus: Aotus
- Species: †A. dindensis

Binomial name
- †Aotus dindensis Setoguchi & Rosenberger 1987

Extinct species of monkey

Aotus dindensis is an extinct species of New World monkeys in the genus Aotus from the Middle Miocene (Laventan in the South American land mammal ages; 13.8 to 11.8 Ma). Its remains have been found at the Konzentrat-Lagerstätte of La Venta in the Honda Group of Colombia.

== Etymology ==
The species was named after the locality where its fossils were found, the El Dinde site of the "Monkey Unit" in the Honda Group, Colombia.

== Description ==
Fossils of Aotus dindensis were discovered in 1986 in the Honda Group, that has been dated to the Laventan, about 12.5 to 12.1 Ma. The species is considered the oldest member of Aotus, recognised for the almost identical mandibular and dental morphology. It may be the ancestor of the extant Aotus species of South America, though other authors consider the species a synonym of Mohanamico.

The material consists of a left hemimandible, a left maxillary fragment preserving roots and lingual half of M3. The dental parts of Aotus dindensis was more primitive than that of extant Aotus. As the night monkeys of today, Aotus dindensis probably had a similar nocturnal lifestyle, with a less specialised diet. A body mass of 1,054 grams (2.324 lb) has been estimated for Aotus dindensis.

The teeth of Aotus dindensis show a tendency for sexual dimorphism, which is degenerate in modern Aotus species. The species itself seems to have been nocturnal, but it is believed that the characteristics of its diurnal ancestors remained.

The locomotion of Aotus, Callicebus, Cebupithecia and the Argentinian genus Dolichocebus has been described as primarily quadrupedal with some leaping.

=== Evolution ===
The evolutionary split in New World monkeys between Callitrichidae and Aotus has been estimated at 17.5 Ma. The Early Miocene origin for the genus Aotus is the longest of primates, with only Macaca traceable to the Late Miocene, approximately eight million years ago.

=== Habitat ===
The Honda Group, and more precisely the "Monkey Beds", are the richest site for fossil primates in South America. It has been argued that the monkeys of the Honda Group were living in habitat that was in contact with the Amazon and Orinoco Basins, and that La Venta itself was probably seasonally dry forest. From the same level as where Aotus dindensis has been found, also fossils of Cebupithecia, Micodon, Mohanamico, Saimiri annectens, Saimiri fieldsi and Stirtonia tatacoensis have been uncovered.

== See also ==
- List of primates of Colombia
- Miocallicebus
