= Saimiri fieldsi =

Saimiri fieldsi Temporal range: Middle Miocene (Laventan) ~13.8–11.8 Ma ]

Conservation status
- Extinct

Scientific classification
- Kingdom: Animalia
- Phylum: Chordata
- Class: Mammalia
- Order: Primates
- Suborder: Haplorhini
- Family: Cebidae
- Genus: Saimiri
- Species: †S. fieldsi

Binomial name
- †Saimiri fieldsi Stirton 1951

Synonyms
- Neosaimiri fieldsi Stirton 1951

Extinct species of new world monkey

Saimiri fieldsi is an extinct species of New World monkey in the genus Saimiri (squirrel monkeys) from the Middle Miocene (Laventan in the South American land mammal ages; 13.8 to 11.8 Ma). Its remains have been found at the Konzentrat-Lagerstätte of La Venta in the Honda Group of Colombia.

== Description ==
More than 200 fossil specimens of Saimiri fieldsi, formerly described as Neosaimiri fieldsi, were recovered from the Middle Miocene Villavieja Formation, that has been dated to the Laventan, about 13 to 12 Ma, during fieldwork in 1989 and 1990. The holotype of Saimiri which was recovered in 1949, is an incomplete mandible and dentition, while later materials include not only lower but also upper dentition and deciduous teeth.

The fossils were differentiated from Saimiri in the proportions of tooth series, with smaller incisors and larger molars; in the structure of the P4 hypocone; and in the morphology of M1-2, which shows strong polymorphism. Also the species has been described as more robust than the extant Saimiri. This led researchers to identify an independent genus, Neosaimiri, as a Middle Miocene ancestor of Saimiri. Laventiana annectens, which was recovered at the same location in 1988, has been concluded to be a junior synonym of Neosaimiri, placed later in the same genus as Saimiri annectens.

The lower molars of the fossil Saimiri resemble those of Dolichocebus, from Argentina. An estimated body mass of 768 to 840 grams (1.693 to 1.852 lb) has been suggested for Saimiri fieldsi.

=== Evolution ===
The evolutionary split in New World monkeys between Cebus and Saimiri has been estimated at 16.7 Ma.

=== Habitat ===
The La Venta Lagerstätte of the Honda Group, and more precisely the "Monkey Beds", are the richest site for fossil primates in South America. It has been argued that the monkeys of the Honda Group were living in habitat that was in contact with the Amazon and Orinoco Basins, and that La Venta itself was probably seasonally dry forest. Other fossil New World primates uncovered from the same locality are Aotus dindensis, Cebupithecia, Mohanamico and Stirtonia tatacoensis.

== See also ==
- List of primates of Colombia
- Lagonimico
