= Nuciruptor =

Nuciruptor Temporal range: Middle Miocene (Laventan) ~13.5–13.0 Ma

Scientific classification
- Kingdom: Animalia
- Phylum: Chordata
- Class: Mammalia
- Order: Primates
- Suborder: Haplorhini
- Family: Pitheciidae
- Subfamily: Pitheciinae
- Genus: †Nuciruptor; Meldrum & Kay 1997

Species
- N. rubricae (type)

Extinct genus of monkeys

Nuciruptor is an extinct genus of New World monkeys from the Middle Miocene (Laventan in the South American land mammal ages; 13.8 to 11.8 million years ago). Its remains have been found at the Konzentrat-Lagerstätte of La Venta in the Honda Group of Colombia. The type species is N. rubricae.

== Etymology ==
The generic name Nuciruptor rubricae is derived from the Latin nuci ("nut") and ruptor meaning "to break". The specific rubricae refers to the red beds where the fossils have been found.

== Description ==
A lower mandible fossil of Nuciruptor was discovered in the El Cardón redbeds of the Cerro Colorado Member of the Villavieja Formation, Honda Group, just below the San Francisco Sandstone, which has been dated to the Laventan, about 12.8 ± 0.2 million years old. From the same locality, fossils of Saimiri annectens were recovered.

Nuciruptor resembles living pitheciins in having elongated, procumbent, and styliform lower incisors with very weak lingual heels. Moreover, as in living pitheciins, the incisors are set in a procumbently oriented mandibular symphysis, and its mandibular corpus deepens appreciably under the molars. At the same time, Nuciruptor does not possess several of the distinctive synapomorphies of extant pitheciins. Nuciruptor remains more primitive than living pitheciins in that no diastemata separate its lower incisors from the canines. Its lower canines retain the primitive structure in not having a sharply defined protocristid. P2 is not a robust or high-crowned tooth and does not have a metaconid. Neither are the other premolars molarised by the addition of large talonids. The estimated weight of Nuciruptor was 2,000 grams (4.4 lb). The genus shows similarity with another fossil primate from La Venta, Cebupithecia.

As Cebupithecia, Nuciruptor is thought to be an ancestral saki (Pitheciidae).

=== Habitat ===
The Honda Group, and more precisely the "Monkey Beds", are the richest site for fossil primates in South America. The monkeys of the Honda Group arguably were living in habitat that was in contact with the Amazon and Orinoco Basins, and that La Venta itself was probably seasonally dry forest.

== See also ==
- List of primates of Colombia
- Lagonimico
- Mohanamico
