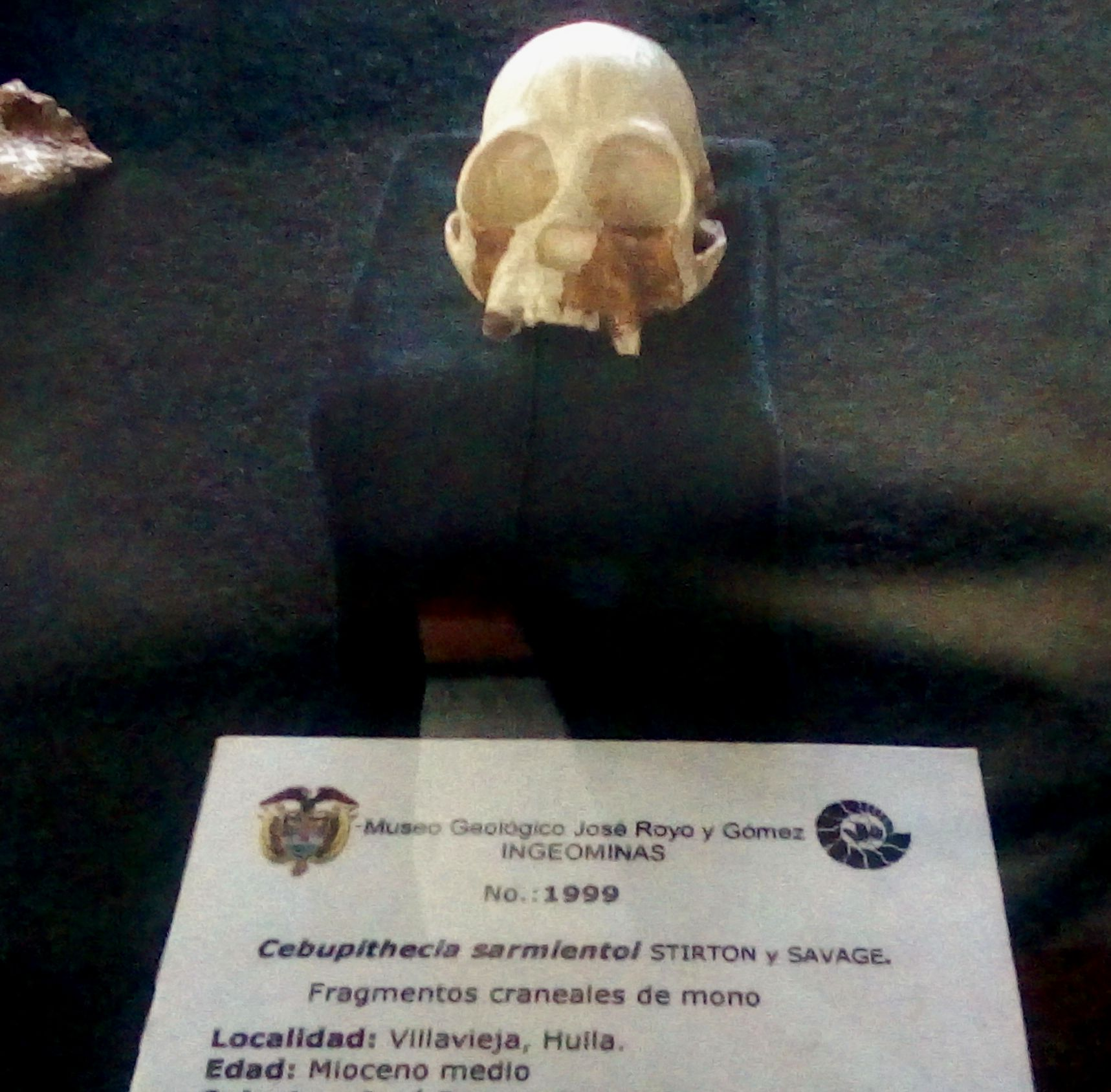
- Reconstructed skull

Scientific classification
- Kingdom: Animalia
- Phylum: Chordata
- Class: Mammalia
- Order: Primates
- Family: Pitheciidae
- Subfamily: Pitheciinae
- Genus: †Cebupithecia; Stirton & Savage 1950

Species
- C. sarmientoi (type)

= Cebupithecia =

Cebupithecia Temporal range: Middle Miocene (Laventan) ~13.8–11.8 Ma

Single-species extinct genus of monkeys

Cebupithecia is an extinct genus of New World monkeys from the Middle Miocene (Laventan in the South American land mammal ages; 13.8 to 11.8 million years ago). Its remains have been found at the Konzentrat-Lagerstätte of La Venta in the Honda Group of Colombia. The type species is C. sarmientoi.

== Description ==
Fossils of Cebupithecia were discovered in the "Monkey Beds" of the Honda Group, that has been dated to the Laventan, about 13.5 million years ago. Cebupithecia had a dental formula of 2:1:3:3 on the lower jaw. The incisors of this species were procumbent, suggesting a close relation to Pithecia. and the canines had a stout appearance. The molars were flat with cusps having little contours. Cebupithecia had an estimated average body mass around 1,602 g (3.532 lb). Cebupithecia had a relatively longer talar neck and a higher, more squared-shaped talar body. In these features, Cebupithecia is more like cebines or aotins than pitheciines, but its overall pattern is unlike any living platyrrhine group or any of the known fossils.

=== Movement ===
Cebupithecia also exhibits a relatively large medial protuberance, which is smoothed, another resemblance to aotins. The significance of these characteristics is difficult to interpret. Cebupithecia may be the most primitive known pitheciine, retaining shared primitive resemblances with aotins and cebines. Alternatively, its unusual morphology could reflect a unique, derived (for pitheciines) locomotor pattern. The talar features that distinguish Cebupithecia from other pitheciines indicate that leaping was relatively more frequent, as is also indicated by other postcranial features. The locomotor behavior of Cebupithecia has been reconstructed as frequent quadrupedalism and leaping, or more relying on vertical clinging and leaping rather than quadrupedal locomotion, much like members of the extant genus Pithecia, to which the genus is related.

Later research suggests that Cebupithecia may have employed its tail differently from most nonprehensile-tailed platyrrhines living today, behaviors that possibly involved tail-bracing or twisting during hindlimb (pedal grasping) suspensory behaviors. Such behaviors may serve as a preadaptive model for the full-fledged evolution of below-branch tail suspension and prehensility seen in other New World primates.

=== Evolution ===
The evolutionary split between Pitheciidae, of which Cebupithecia, and Callicebus, including Miocallicebus, also found in the Honda Group, has been placed at 15.2 million years ago.

=== Habitat ===
The Honda Group, and more precisely the "Monkey Beds", are the richest site for fossil primates in South America. It has been argued that the monkeys of the Honda Group were living in habitat that was in contact with the Amazon and Orinoco Basins, and that La Venta itself was probably seasonally dry forest. From the same level as where Cebupithecia has been found, fossils of Aotus dindensis, Micodon, Mohanamico, Saimiri annectens, Saimiri fieldsi, and Stirtonia tatacoensis have also been uncovered.

== See also ==
- List of primates of Colombia
- Nuciruptor
