= Laventan =

Period of geologic time within the Middle Miocene epoch

The Laventan (Spanish: Laventense) age is a period of geologic time (13.8 to 11.8 Ma) within the Middle Miocene epoch of the Neogene, used more specifically within the SALMA classification in South America. It follows the Colloncuran and precedes the Mayoan age.

== Etymology ==
The age is named after the Miocene Lagerstätte La Venta, where a rich biodiversity from the Middle Miocene has been recovered from the Honda Group.

== Formations ==
Locations of Laventan formations

Formation bold is type	Country	Basin	Notes
Honda Group	Colombia	Upper Magdalena Valley	
Honda Group	Bolivia	Quebrada Honda Basin	
Aisol Formation	Argentina	San Rafael Block	
Bahía Inglesa Formation	Chile	Caldera Basin	
Capadare Formation	Venezuela	Falcón Basin	
Choquecota Formation	Bolivia	Altiplano Basin	
Cura-Mallín Group	Chile	Cura-Mallín Basin	
Ipururo Formation	Peru	Ucayali Basin	
Paraná Formation	Argentina	Paraná Basin	
Pebas Formation	Brazil; Colombia; Ecuador; Peru	Amazon Basin	
Pisco Formation	Peru	Pisco Basin	
Santa Inés Formation	Venezuela	Eastern Venezuela Basin	
Sincelejo Formation	Colombia	Sinú-San Jacinto Basin	
Socorro Formation	Venezuela	Falcón Basin	
Urumaco Formation	Venezuela	Falcón Basin	

== Fossil content ==
Group	Fossils	Formation	Notes
Mammals	lesser bulldog bat (Noctilio albiventris), LaVal's disk-winged bat (Thyroptera lavali), Spix's disk-winged bat (Thyroptera tricolor), Acarechimys minutissimus, Anachlysictis gracilis, Anadasypus hondanus, Aotus dindensis, Boreostemma acostae, B. gigantea, Brievabradys laventensis, Cebupithecia sarmientoi, Dukecynus magnus, Eodolichotis elachys, E. maddeni, Glossotheriopsis pascuali, Granastrapotherium snorki, Hilarcotherium castanedaii, Hondadelphys fieldsi, Hondathentes cazador, Huilabradys magdaleniensis, Huilatherium pluriplicatum, Kiotomops lopezi, Lagonimico conclucatus, Lycopsis longirostrus, Megadolodus molariformis, Micodon kiotensis, Micoureus laventicus, Microscleromys cribiphilus, M. paradoxalis, Microsteiromys jacobsi, Miocallicebus villaviejai, Miocochilius anomopodus, Mohanamico hershkovitzi, Mormopterus colombiensis, Nanoastegotherium prostatum, Neoglyptatelus originalis, Neonematherium flabellatum, Neoreomys huilensis, Neotamandua borealis, Notonycteris magdalenensis, N. sucharadeus, Nuciruptor rubricae, Pachybiotherium minor, Palynephyllum antimaster, Patasola magdalenae, Pedrolypeutes praecursor, Pericotoxodon platignathus, Pitheculites chenche, Potamops mascahehenes, Potamosiren magdalenensis, Prodolichotis guerreroi, P. pridiana, Prolicaphrium sanalfolsensis, Prothoatherium colombianus, Pseudoprepotherium confusum, Rhodanodolichotis antepridiana, R. vucetichae, Ricardomys longidens, Saimiri annectens, S. fieldsi, Scleromys colombianus, S. schurmanni, Scirrotherium hondaensis, Stirtonia tatacoensis, S. victoriae, Thylamys colombianus, Thylamys minutus, Thyroptera robusta, Villarroelia totoyoi, Xenastrapotherium kraglievichi, Cochilius sp., Diclidurus sp., Eumops sp., Hapalops sp., Olenopsis sp., Theosodon sp., ?Steiromys sp., Dolichotinae sp., ?Echimyidae sp., Megalonychidae sp., Megatheriinae sp., Nothrotheriinae sp., Dasypodidae sp., Leontiniidae sp., Proterotheriidae indet., Toxodontidae sp.	Honda; Group; Colombia	
Mammals	Acyon myctoderos, Australogale leptognathus, Chimeralestes ambiguus, Guiomys unica, Hapalops angustipalatus, Hemihegetotherium trilobus, Hiskatherium saintandrei, Hondalagus altiplanensis, Lakukullus anatisrostratus, Mesoprocta hypsodus, Miocochilius federicoi, Palaeothentes relictus, P. serratus, Propalaehoplophorus andinus, Quebradahondomys potosiensis, Acarechimys sp., cf. Paratrigodon sp., Prolagostomus sp., cf. Prozaedyus sp., Lagostominae indet., Mesotheriinae indet., Borhyaenidae indet., Caenolestidae indet., Capromyidae indet., Caviidae indet., Chinchillidae indet., Echimyidae indet., Euphractinae indet., Macraucheniidae indet., Octodontidae indet., Proterotheriidae indet., ? Xenastrapotherium indet.	Honda; Group; Bolivia	
Mammals	Nesodon taweretus, cf. Astrapotherium sp., cf. Theosodon sp., Lomaphorini indet., Mylodontinae indet., Propalaehoplophorinae indet., Toxodontidae indet.	Aisol	
Mammals	Microtypotherium choquecotense, Prozaedyus sp., Chinchillidae indet., Glyptodontidae indet., Hegetotheriidae indet.	Choquecota	
Mammals	Heteropsomyinae (aff. Acarechimys) sp., Dasyproctidae (aff. Alloiomys) sp., Prolagostomus sp., Caviomorpha indet., Dasypodidae indet., Typotheria indet.	Cura-Mallín	
Mammals	Drytomomys cf. aequatorialis, Granastrapotherium cf. snorki, Miocochilius anomopodus, Neoglyptatelus originalis, Parapropalaehoplophorus septentrionalis, Pericotoxodon cf. platignathus, Potamarchus murinus, cf. Theosodon sp., Acarechimys sp., Boreostemma sp., Megathericulus sp., cf. Tetramerorhinus sp., Urumacotherium sp., Xenastrapotherium sp., Borhyaenoidea indet., Delphinida indet., Glyptodontidae indet., Macraucheniidae indet., Megalonychidae indet., Mylodontidae indet., Octodontoidea indet., Potamarchinae indet., Uruguaytheriinae indet.	Ipururo	
Mammals	Pontistes rectifrons, Prionodelphis rovereti, Properiptychus argentinus, Protautoga longidens, cf. Balaenoptera sp., Chrysophrys sp., Dioplotherium sp., Balaenidae indet., Physeteridae indet., Sciaenidae indet., ?Sparidae indet.	Paraná	
Mammals	Dinomyidae indet., ? Octodontoidea indet.	Pebas	
Mammals	Boreostemma venezolensis	Santa Inés	
Mammals	Neoglyptatelus sincelejanus	Sincelejo	
Mammals	Mirandabradys socorrensis, Megatheriidae indet.	Socorro	
Mammals	cf. Olenopsis sp., Mylodontidae indet.	Urumaco	
Birds	Aramus paludigrus, Galbula hylochoreutes, Hoazinoides magdalenae	Honda; Group; Colombia	
Birds	Psilopteridae indet.	Aisol	
Birds	Pygoscelis calderensis, Spheniscus megaramphus, S. urbinai, Pelagornis sp., aff. Thalassarche sp.	Bahía; Inglesa	
Birds	Pelagornis cf. chilensis	Capadare	
Reptiles & amphibians	cane toad (Bufo marinus), Chelus colombiana, Chelonoidis hesterna, Colombophis portai, Dracaena colombiana, ?Eunectes stirtoni, Podocnemis medemi, Gryposuchus colombianus, Langstonia huilensis, Purussaurus neivensis, Balanerodus logimus, Charactosuchus fieldsi, Mourasuchus atopus, Eocaiman sp., Gavialis sp., Sebecus sp., Alligatoridae indet.	Honda; Group; Colombia	
Reptiles & amphibians	Crocodylia sp.	Aisol	
Reptiles & amphibians	Bairdemys thalassica	Capadare	
Reptiles & amphibians	Barinasuchus arveloi	Ipururo	
Reptiles & amphibians	Caiman wannlangstoni, Gnatusuchus pebasensis, Gryposuchus pachakamue, Purussaurus neivensis, Kuttanacaiman iquitosensis, Mourasuchus atopus, Paleosuchus sp., Podocnemis sp., Gavialoidea indet.	Pebas	
Reptiles & amphibians	Colombophis spinosus, Ikanogavialis gameroi, Caiman sp., Mourasuchus sp., Purussaurus sp., Thecachampsa sp., Alethinophidia indet., Boinae indet.	Socorro	
Reptiles & amphibians	Globidentosuchus cf. brachyrostris, Caiman sp., Mourasuchus sp., Purussaurus sp.	Urumaco	
Fishes & crustaceans	Colossoma macropomum, Lepidosiren paradoxa, cf. Acanthicus, Arapaima sp., Brachyplatystoma cf. B. vaillanti, Brachyplatystoma promagdalena, Sylviocarcinus piriformis, cf. Corydoras sp., Hoplias sp., cf. Hoplosternum sp., Hydrolycus sp., Phractocephalus hemioliopterus, Serrasalmus sp., Pygocentrus sp., or Pristobrycon sp. (cf. Myletes sp.), Ariidae indet., Characidae cf. Tetragonopterinae, Cichlidae indet., Doradidae indet., Loricariidae indet., Potamotrygonidae indet.	Honda; Group; Colombia	
Fishes & crustaceans	Megalodon, Carcharias acutissima, Carcharodon hastalis, Galeocerdo aduncus, Hemipristis serra, Carcharhinus sp., Heterodontus sp., Squalus sp., Squatina sp., Dasyatidae indet., Myliobatoidea indet., Potamotrygonidae indet.	Paraná	
Fishes & crustaceans	cf. Hydrolycus sp., Leporinus sp., Potamotrygon sp., Pristis sp., Anostomidae indet.	Pebas	
Fishes & crustaceans	Megalodon, Aetobatus arcuatus, Hemipristis serra, Mugil cephalus, Carcharhinus sp., Citharichthys sp., Galeocerdo sp., Rhinoptera sp., Sphyrna sp., Symphurus sp.	Socorro	
Insects	Macroteleia yaguarum, Sycorax peruensis	Pebas	
Flora	Astroniumxylon parabalansae, Piptadenioxylon paraexcelsa, Solanumxylon paranensis	Paraná	

== Correlations ==
The Laventan (13.8 to 11.8 Ma) correlates with:

- NALMA
  - latest Barstovian (15.97-13.65 Ma)
  - early Clarendonian (13.65-10.3 Ma)
- Californian ages
  - Luisian (15.5-13.5 Ma)
- ELMA - Astaracian (15.97-11.608 Ma)
- CPS
  - Badenian (13.65-12.7 Ma)
  - Sarmatian (12.7-11.608 Ma)
- New Zealand stratigraphy - Southland epoch (15.9-10.92 Ma)
  - Lillburnian (15.1-12.98 Ma)
  - early Waiauan (12.98-10.92 Ma)
- Australian ages
  - Bairnsdalian (15.0-10.5 Ma)
- Japanese ages
  - Tozawan (15.97-13.5 Ma)
- NMAC - Tunggurian (13.65-11.1 Ma)

Laventan correlations in South America
Formation	Honda	Honda	Aisol	Cura-Mallín	Pisco	Ipururo	Pebas	Capadare	Urumaco	Inés	Paraná	Map
Basin	VSM	Honda	San Rafael	Caldera	Pisco	Ucayali	Amazon	Falcón		Venezuela	Paraná	Laventan (South America)
Country	Colombia	Bolivia	Argentina	Chile	Peru			Venezuela			Argentina	Laventan (South America)
Boreostemma												Laventan (South America)
Hapalops												Laventan (South America)
Miocochilius												Laventan (South America)
Theosodon												Laventan (South America)
Xenastrapotherium												Laventan (South America)
Mylodontidae												Laventan (South America)
Sparassodonta												Laventan (South America)
Primates												Laventan (South America)
Rodents												Laventan (South America)
Birds												Laventan (South America)
Terror birds												Laventan (South America)
Reptiles												Laventan (South America)
megalodon												Laventan (South America)
Flora												Laventan (South America)
Insects												Laventan (South America)
Environments	Fluvial			Fluvio-deltaic		Fluvio-lacustrine		Fluvio-deltaic			Fluvial	Laventan volcanoclastics Laventan fauna Laventan flora
Volcanic	Yes											Laventan volcanoclastics Laventan fauna Laventan flora
