= Saimiri annectens =

Saimiri annectens Temporal range: Middle Miocene (Laventan) ~13.8–11.8 Ma

Scientific classification
- Kingdom: Animalia
- Phylum: Chordata
- Class: Mammalia
- Order: Primates
- Suborder: Haplorhini
- Infraorder: Simiiformes
- Family: Cebidae
- Genus: Saimiri
- Species: †S. annectens

Binomial name
- †Saimiri annectens Kay & Meldrum 1997

Synonyms
- Laventiana annectens Rosenberger et al. 1991; Neosaimiri annectens Kay & Meldrum 1997

Extinct species of new world monkey

Saimiri annectens, originally described as Laventiana annectens and later as Neosaimiri annectens, is an extinct species of New World monkey in the genus Saimiri from the Middle Miocene (Laventan in the South American land mammal ages; 13.8 to 11.8 Ma). Its remains have been found at the Konzentrat-Lagerstätte of La Venta in the Honda Group of Colombia.

== Etymology ==
The former genus name Laventiana refers to the La Venta site where the fossils have been found. The species epithet annectens is derived from the Latin words ad-, "towards" and nectens, "tying" or "connecting", in reference to the fossil's phylogenetic implications.

== Description ==
Fossils of Saimiri annectens, earlier described as Neosaimiri annectens and originally as Laventiana annectens, were discovered at the Masato Site in the upper redbeds of the Villavieja Formation, that has been dated to the Laventan, about 13.5 Ma.

It was described as an intermediate between squirrel monkeys (Saimiri) and callitrichines (marmosets and tamarins) in the morphology of the lower molars, mandible, and talus. Saimiri annectens is, described as Laventiana annectens according to Rosenberger et al., closely related to Saimiri and to Cebus (capuchin monkeys), yet resembled the probable callitrichine morphotype, demonstrating that archaic relatives of a Saimiri-like stock were suitable structural ancestors for the enigmatic callitrichines. Saimiri annectens is described as more primitive than Saimiri fieldsi from the same fauna, further increasing the likelihood that the latter is a lineal ancestor of modern squirrel monkeys.

The lower molars of the fossil Saimiri resemble those of Dolichocebus, from Argentina. An estimated body mass of 605 to 800 grams (1.334 to 1.764 lb) has been suggested for Saimiri annectens.

=== Evolution ===
The evolutionary split in New World monkeys between Cebus and Saimiri has been estimated at 16.7 Ma.

=== Habitat ===
The Honda Group, and more precisely the "Monkey Beds", are the richest site for fossil primates in South America. It has been argued that the monkeys of the Honda Group were living in habitat that was in contact with the Amazon and Orinoco Basins, and that La Venta itself was probably seasonally dry forest. From the same level as where Saimiri annectens has been found, also fossils of Cebupithecia, Micodon, Mohanamico, and Stirtonia tatacoensis have been uncovered.

== See also ==
- List of primates of Colombia
- Nuciruptor
