= Stirtonia (mammal) =

Stirtonia Temporal range: Middle Miocene (Laventan) ~13.5–13.0 Ma

Scientific classification
- Kingdom: Animalia
- Phylum: Chordata
- Class: Mammalia
- Order: Primates
- Suborder: Haplorhini
- Family: Atelidae
- Subfamily: Atelinae
- Genus: †Stirtonia; Hershkovitz 1970

Species
- S. tatacoensis (Hershkovitz 1970, type); S. victoriae (Kay et al. 1987)

Synonyms
- Homunculus tatacoensis Stirton 1951; Kondous laventicus Setoguchi 1985

Extinct genus of monkeys

Stirtonia is an extinct genus of New World monkeys from the Middle Miocene (Laventan in the South American land mammal ages; 13.8 to 11.8 Ma). Its remains have been found at the Konzentrat-Lagerstätte of La Venta in the Honda Group of Colombia. Two species have been described, S. victoriae and the type species S. tatacoensis. Synonyms are Homunculus tatacoensis, described by Ruben Arthur Stirton in 1951 and Kondous laventicus by Setoguchi in 1985. The genus is classified in Alouattini as an ancestor to the modern howler monkeys.

== Etymology ==
Stirtonia is named after the scientist who first discovered it, Ruben Arthur Stirton. The two species, S. tatcoensis and S. victoriae, are named after the locations in which they were found: S. tatacoensis gets its name from the Tatacoa desert; and S. victoriae gets its name from the village “La Victoria” near its discovery site.

== Description ==
The genus is the largest primate found at La Venta, with estimated body masses of S. tatacoensis at 5,513 grams (12.154 lb) and of S. victoriae at 10 kilograms (22 lb). Stirtonia tatacoensis and S. victoriae are known by several teeth, a mandible and a maxilla that closely resemble, and are almost indistinguishable from, the living Alouatta.

Fossil teeth found in the Solimões Formation at the Acre River in the border region of Brazil and Peru may belong to Stirtonia.

== Fossil record ==
A lower mandible fossil of S. tatacoensis was discovered during fieldwork between 1944 and 1949, in the Honda Group, that has been dated to the Laventan, about 13 Ma.

Upper jaws and other cranial material of the large primate Stirtonia victoriae from the Perico Member of the La Dorada Formation, Honda Group were discovered in 1985 and 1986. Based on stratigraphic position, more than 300 metres (980 ft) below the Stirtonia tatacoensis type locality, this was the oldest primate material known until 1987 from Colombia.

== Evolution ==
The evolutionary split between Atelidae, of which Stirtonia, and Pitheciidae plus Callicebus, has been placed at 17.0 million years ago.

== Palaeobiology ==
=== Palaeoecology ===
Geometric morphometric analysis suggests that S. victoriae was a folivore.

== Habitat ==
The Honda Group, and more precisely the "Monkey Beds", are the richest site for fossil primates in South America. It has been argued that the monkeys of the Honda Group were living in habitat that was in contact with the Amazon and Orinoco Basins, and that La Venta itself was probably seasonally dry forest. From the same level as where Stirtonia tatacoensis has been found, also fossils of Aotus dindensis, Micodon, Mohanamico, Saimiri annectens, Saimiri fieldsi and Cebupithecia have been uncovered. Stirtonia reinforced the notion that leaf-eating was an enduring and essential aspect of the howler monkey's ecophylogenetic biology.

== See also ==
- List of primates of Colombia
- Miocallicebus
- Mohanamico
