= Miocallicebus =

Miocallicebus Temporal range: Middle Miocene (Laventan) ~13.8–11.8 Ma

Scientific classification
- Kingdom: Animalia
- Phylum: Chordata
- Class: Mammalia
- Order: Primates
- Suborder: Haplorhini
- Family: Pitheciidae
- Subfamily: Callicebinae
- Genus: †Miocallicebus; Takai et al. 2001

Type species
- †Miocallicebus villaviejai

Extinct genus of monkeys

Miocallicebus is an extinct genus of New World monkeys from the Middle Miocene (Laventan in the South American land mammal ages; 13.8 to 11.8 mya). Its remains have been found at the Konzentrat-Lagerstätte of La Venta in the Honda Group of Colombia. The type species is Miocallicebus villaviejai.

== Etymology ==
Miocallicebus is derived from the Greek name for the modern genus of titis, Callicebus, with the prefix Mio- for Miocene. The species epithet refers to Villavieja, a village close to where the fossil remains were found.

== Description ==
Fossils of Miocallicebus were discovered in 1997 during a field study executed by researchers at the Primate Research Institute of Kyoto University. The specimen consists of a right maxillary fragment preserving a root of M1, a complete M2, and a badly damaged M3, discovered at the Bolivia Site in the Tatacoa Desert of Huila, south-central Colombia. The genus has not been found in the "Monkey Beds" of La Venta. The fossil remains were uncovered just above the Tatacoa Sandstone Beds of the La Victoria Formation, which has been dated to the Laventan with a range from 13.86 to 12.38 mya.

The estimated weight for Miocallicebus, considered similar to but much larger than the extant genus Callicebus, is 1,500 grams (3.3 lb). However, it may be phylogenically nestled within Callicebus, which would warrant a replacement of the species to be in that genus.

The evolutionary split between Pitheciidae of Cebupithecia from the Honda Group and Callicebus, including Miocallicebus, has been placed at 15.2 mya.

=== Habitat ===
The Honda Group, and more precisely the "Monkey Beds", are the richest site for fossil primates in South America. It has been argued that the monkeys of the Honda Group were living in habitat that was in contact with the Amazon and Orinoco Basins, and that La Venta itself was probably seasonally dry forest.

== See also ==
- List of primates of Colombia
- Stirtonia (monkey)
