= Colombophis =

Colombophis Temporal range: Mid-Late Miocene (Friasian-Huayquerian) ~15.97–7.25 Ma

Scientific classification
- Kingdom: Animalia
- Phylum: Chordata
- Class: Reptilia
- Order: Squamata
- Suborder: Serpentes
- Infraorder: Alethinophidia
- Genus: †Colombophis; Hoffstetter & Rage 1977

Species
- C. portai Hoffstetter & Rage 1977 (type); C. spinosus Hsiou et al. 2010

Extinct genus of snakes

Colombophis ("snake of Colombia" in Greek) is an extinct genus of snakes of the clade Alethinophidia, a group of "primitive" snakes. The genus was first recognized in the Villavieja Formation in the town of Los Mangos, part of the known fossil fauna of La Venta in the department of Huila (Colombia), in the middle Miocene. With the remains of a fossil snake was erected the species Colombophis portai in 1977, based on forty fragmentary vertebrae. These vertebrae are characterized by a low neural spine, and subdivided paradiapophysis and thin zygosphene. The vertebrae are medium to large, so the snake would measure about 1.77 metres (5 ft 10 in) long, similar in size to the current boa constrictor.

== Taxonomy ==
Remains found in the Brazilian Solimões Formation in the Purus River area (Late Miocene), with vertebrae shorter than wide, thick zygosphene and high neural thorn, were classified as a new species, Colombophis spinosus; fossil remains found in Venezuela (Urumaco area) and Colombia (La Venta) also seem to belong to this new species rather than C. portai. Traditionally, Colombophis was taken as a representative of the family primitive Aniliidae, fossorial and primitive snakes that still retained some traces of lizard as Anilius, the false coral. However, retention of primitive traits that identify Colombophis and other members of the superfamily Anilioidea (including features already found in the Cretaceous snake Dinilysia patagonica) indicates that this group is paraphyletic and that for now, Colombophis remains as an Alethinophidia of uncertain classification. Moreover, their remains indicate that the ecosystems of South America from the mid-Miocene were humid tropical environments as reinforces the finding of other reptile faunas of Urumaco, La Venta and Solimões as Paradracaena and Eunectes stirtoni; Colombophis, like Dinilysia, must be adapted to move and feed in semi-aquatic environments. Fossils were also found in the Socorro Formation of Venezuela.
