= Hondalagus =

Hondalagus Temporal range: Mid Miocene (Laventan) ~13.8–11.8 Ma

Scientific classification
- Domain: Eukaryota
- Kingdom: Animalia
- Phylum: Chordata
- Class: Mammalia
- Order: †Polydolopimorphia
- Family: †Argyrolagidae
- Genus: †Hondalagus; Marshall & Villarroel, 1988

Type species
- †Hondalagus altiplanensis Marshall & Villarroel, 1988

Prehistoric genus of mammals

Hondalagus is an extinct genus of mammals that lived during the Middle Miocene epoch (Laventan) in South America. Their fossils were found in the Honda Group at Quebrada Honda, in southern Bolivia. Hondalagus represents the smallest and most specialized member of the extinct family Argyrolagidae.
