= Patasola magdalenae =

Patasola magdalenae Temporal range: Middle Miocene (Laventan) ~13.4–11.8 Ma

Scientific classification
- Kingdom: Animalia
- Phylum: Chordata
- Class: Mammalia
- Order: Primates
- Suborder: Haplorhini
- Family: Callitrichidae
- Genus: †Patasola; Kay & Meldrum, 1997
- Species: †P. magdalenae

Binomial name
- †Patasola magdalenae Kay & Meldrum, 1997

Extinct genus of new world monkeys

Patasola is an extinct genus of New World monkeys from the Middle Miocene (Laventan in the South American land mammal ages; 13.8 to 11.8 Ma). Its remains have been found at the Konzentrat-Lagerstätte of La Venta in the Honda Group of Colombia. The type species is Patasola magdalenae.

== Etymology ==
Patasola magdalenae is named after the mythological Patasola ("one foot"), a forest spirit of the Gran Tolima region of Colombia. The species epithet refers to the Magdalena River in which valley the fossils were found.

== Description ==
Fossils of Patasola, a small insectivorous/frugivorous primate, were discovered in both the La Victoria and Villavieja Formations above and below the "Monkey Beds" of the Honda Group, that has been dated to the Laventan, about 13.4 to 11.8 Ma.

The type mandible of Patasola magdalenae is a juvenile specimen. The estimated weight of Patasola was 480 grams (1.06 lb), similar in size to the extant genus Leontopithecus.

The genus is included in the Callitrichidae, after an initial description as an intermediate between the Callitrichidae and Saimiri.

=== Habitat ===
The Honda Group, and more precisely the "Monkey Beds", are the richest site for fossil primates in South America. It has been argued that the monkeys of the Honda Group were living in habitat that was in contact with the Amazon and Orinoco Basins, and that La Venta itself was probably seasonally dry forest. The authors of the publication about Patasola however suggests the presence of rain forest.

== See also ==
- List of primates of Colombia
- Lagonimico
- Mohanamico
