= Aramus paludigrus =

Aramus paludigrus Temporal range: Mid Miocene (Laventan) ~13.8–11.8 Ma

Scientific classification
- Kingdom: Animalia
- Phylum: Chordata
- Class: Aves
- Order: Gruiformes
- Family: Aramidae
- Genus: Aramus
- Species: †A. paludigrus

Binomial name
- †Aramus paludigrus Rasmussen 1997

Extinct species of bird

Aramus paludigrus is an extinct species of limpkin, semi-aquatic birds related to cranes (order Gruiformes), which are similar. Aramus paludigrus was found in the famous Konzentrat-Lagerstätte of the Honda Group at La Venta, dating from the mid-Miocene period, in central Colombia.

== Description ==
This bird was described in 1997 based on a nearly complete tibiotarsus bone, very similar to its modern relative, the limpkin Aramus garaudana, although this element measured about 196 millimeters (7.7 in) long, which implies a 20% larger size. It also differs from the modern species in that this bone has larger lateral condyles, and its axis is longer and narrower, very similar to that found in modern trumpeters (Psophia). The general ecology of this animal is not dissimilar to the modern limpkin, likely being a rather sedentary bird (as no remains are known from other parts of South America), and with what is known of the strata in which it was found, it likely waded through swamps in search of snails, insects and bivalves to feed on them. This is what led to their scientific name, as Greek paludigrus can be translated as "marsh crane".

== See also ==
- Honda Group
