= Panamacebus =

Panamacebus Temporal range: Aquitanian (Hemingfordian) ~21.1–20.76 Ma

Scientific classification
- Kingdom: Animalia
- Phylum: Chordata
- Class: Mammalia
- Order: Primates
- Suborder: Haplorhini
- Family: Cebidae
- Genus: †Panamacebus; Bloch et al. 2016

Type species
- †Panamacebus transitus Bloch et al. 2016

Extinct genus of new world monkeys

Panamacebus is an extinct genus of monkey known from the Early Miocene (Hemingfordian in the NALMA classification) of central Panama. Panamacebus transitus is the only and type species of this genus.

== Description ==
Together with Paralouatta marianae from Cuba, it is the oldest known New World monkey of North America. Fossils of Panamacebus, a left upper first molar and lower premolar, were uncovered from the Las Cascadas Formation, of which tuffs were analyzed providing an age of 20.93 ± 0.17 Ma, of the Panama Canal Zone.

== See also ==
- List of fossil primates of Central and South America
