= Acrecebus =

Acrecebus Temporal range: Late Miocene (Mayoan-Huayquerian) ~11.6–7.246 Ma

Scientific classification
- Kingdom: Animalia
- Phylum: Chordata
- Class: Mammalia
- Order: Primates
- Suborder: Haplorhini
- Family: Cebidae
- Subfamily: Cebinae
- Genus: †Acrecebus; Kay, 2006
- Species: †A. fraileyi

Binomial name
- †Acrecebus fraileyi Kay, 2006

Extinct monotypic genus of monkeys

Acrecebus is a prehistoric cebid monkey from the Late Miocene Solimões Formation of Acre State, Brazil and Bolivia. The only species known is A. fraileyi. This genus is closely related to the genus Cebus.
