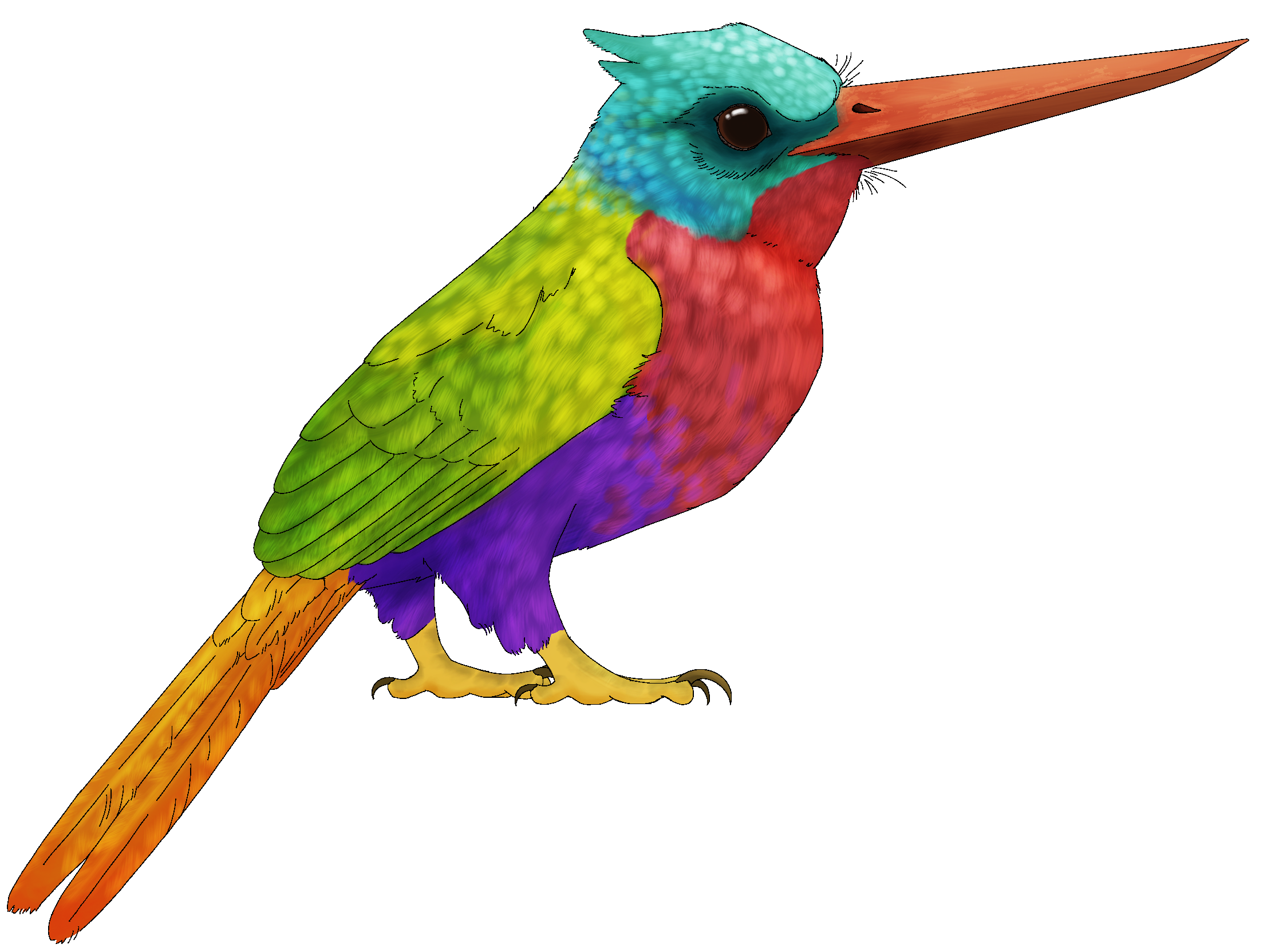
- Artistic reconstruction of Galbula hylochoreutes

Scientific classification
- Domain: Eukaryota
- Kingdom: Animalia
- Phylum: Chordata
- Class: Aves
- Order: Piciformes
- Family: Galbulidae
- Genus: Galbula
- Species: G. hylochoreutes

Binomial name
- Galbula hylochoreutes Rasmussen 1997

= Galbula hylochoreutes =

Galbula hylochoreutes Temporal range: Mid Miocene (Laventan) ~13.8–11.8 Ma

Extinct species of bird

Galbula hylochoreutes is an extinct species of jacamar, a small bird of the order Piciformes. It was discovered in the La Victoria Formation of the Honda Group, at the Konzentrat-Lagerstätte of La Venta in modern Colombia. These deposits are dated to the Laventan period (Middle Miocene, from 13.8 to 11.8 million years ago).

== Description ==
The species was described from one end of the right humerus. Despite the poor preservation of this fossil, it has distinctive features that permit the classification of a distinct species: the head of the humerus is larger than that of modern jacamars (Galbula), so its overall size would have also been somewhat greater. The tubercle of the head is robust and the insertion of the humeral-scapular-caudal muscle is very large, indicating a strong development of the muscles of the chest and wings. G. hylochoreutes likely had great maneuverability in flight, much like birds in the Tyrannidae and Meropidae families, an aspect of its biology that lends to its species name, which means "dancer of the forests" in Greek. Like extant members of its genus, G. hylochoreutes would have inhabited a jungle environment. Its general appearance would have been similar to the paradise jacamar, Galbula dea.

== See also ==
- Honda Group
