= Brievabradys =

Brievabradys Temporal range: Middle Miocene (Laventan) ~13.8–11.8 Ma

Scientific classification
- Kingdom: Animalia
- Phylum: Chordata
- Class: Mammalia
- Order: Pilosa
- Family: †Mylodontidae
- Subfamily: †Mylodontinae
- Genus: †Brievabradys; Villarroel, 2000
- Species: †B. laventense

Binomial name
- †Brievabradys laventense Villarroel, 2000

Extinct genus of ground sloths

Brievabradys is an extinct genus of ground sloth belonging to the family Mylodontidae that lived in Colombia during the Middle Miocene. This genus was discovered in the Honda Group of Colombia, in the strata of the Tatacoa Desert in the Huila Department with an approximate age of 13 to 11 million years ago, dating to the Middle Miocene. Brievabradys was described based on a fossilized skull and additional cranial remains found in that area.

== Description ==
This genus of sloth is characterized by its small size, which is similar to that of the extant two-toed sloth Choloepus ), a skull expanded backwards, a short and robust mandible without a diastema between the teeth, while the first of these possessed a shape similar to that of canine teeth,

== Discovery and naming ==
The first remains of Brievabradys were discovered in the Honda Group of Colombia, in the strata of the Tatacoa Desert in the Huila Department with an approximate age of 13 to 11 million years ago, dating to the Middle Miocene. The remains of this genus had already been known for some time, but their similarity to other members of the superfamily Mylodontoidea had led to the first referred cranial remains which were not as complete as the holotype of Brievabradys, being identified as the Argentine genus Glossotheriopsis. Later examinations would show that despite their general resemblance, they had different characteristics, especially in the shortening of the snout, wider and lower nostrils and differences in the characteristics of their molariform teeth. These characteristics, according to the original publication, indicate that Brievabradys and Glossotheriopsis belong to the subfamily Mylodontinae of the family Mylodontidae, both being related in turn to the species Orophodon hapaloides.

The generic name, Brievabradys, is derived from "Brieva", referring to two scholars of the National University of Colombia, the brothers Eduardo and Jorge E. Brieva, and bradys meaning "slow" or "lazy", while the specific name refers to the La Venta creek, from where the name of the entire fossil deposit comes from, where it coexisted with other sloths such as the nothrotheriid Huilabradys and the mylodontid Magdalenabradys.
