= Mohanamico =

Mohanamico Temporal range: Middle Miocene (Laventan) ~13.8–11.8 Ma

Scientific classification
- Kingdom: Animalia
- Phylum: Chordata
- Class: Mammalia
- Order: Primates
- Suborder: Haplorhini
- Family: Atelidae
- Genus: †Mohanamico; Luchterhand, Kay & Madden 1986

Type species
- †Mohanamico hershkovitzi

Extinct genus of monkeys

Mohanamico is an extinct genus of New World monkeys from the Middle Miocene (Laventan in the South American land mammal ages; 13.8 to 11.8 million years ago-Mya). Its remains have been found at the Konzentrat-Lagerstätte of La Venta in the Honda Group of Colombia. The type species is M. hershkovitzi. Due to the relatively few material found of Mohanamico, the placement of the genus is not certain and four possible families have been proposed by different authors, Atelidae, Callitrichidae, Pitheciidae or Aotidae.

== Etymology ==
Mohanamico hershkovitzi is named after the river god Mohan of the Magdalena River, in which valley the fossils were found and to honor Philip Hershkovitz for his contributions to the study of Colombian and other South American primates.

== Description ==
Fossils of Mohanamico were discovered in the "Monkey Beds" of the Honda Group that has been dated to the Laventan, about 12.5 Mya. Mohanamico was about the size of the living squirrel monkey Saimiri sciureus. Its molars are low-crowned and the molar crests are not pronounced, suggesting a frugivorous diet like Aotus. The lateral incisor is large and high-crowned, which foreshadows living Pitheciidae. The canines and P2 were large and sharp like Callimico. Analysis of the mandible and teeth suggests that Mohanamico is a primitive member of the Pitheciidae. Some similarities with Callimico and Saguinus are also noted, raising the possibility that pithecines and callitrichids are monophyletic.

The estimated weight of Mohanamico was 1,000 g (2.2 lb), similar in size to Aotus dindensis found in the same location. The Argentinian genus Homunculus had smaller molars than Mohanamico.

Some authors place Mohanamico in the Callitrichidae, possibly related to the Callimico clade, based especially on its taller incisors and canines, large p2, and broader and longer trigonid in proportion to the talonid. Other authors dispute this and consider the genus more likely a Pitheciidae, or possibly an Aotidae. It is also shown to be a stem atelid. If placed within the Pitheciidae, the primate would be at the base of the evolutionary radiation because of the large incisors and the structure of its canines and premolars.

=== Habitat ===
The Honda Group, and more precisely the "Monkey Beds", are the richest site for fossil primates in South America. It has been argued that the monkeys of the Honda Group were living in habitat that was in contact with the Amazon and Orinoco Basins, and that La Venta itself was probably seasonally dry forest. From the same level as where Mohanamico has been found, fossils of Cebupithecia, Micodon, Saimiri annectens, Saimiri fieldsi, and Stirtonia also have been uncovered. From the same location, a fossil specimen of the fish tambaqui (Colossoma macropomum) was recovered.

== See also ==
- List of primates of Colombia
- Canaanimico
- Lagonimico
- Patasola
