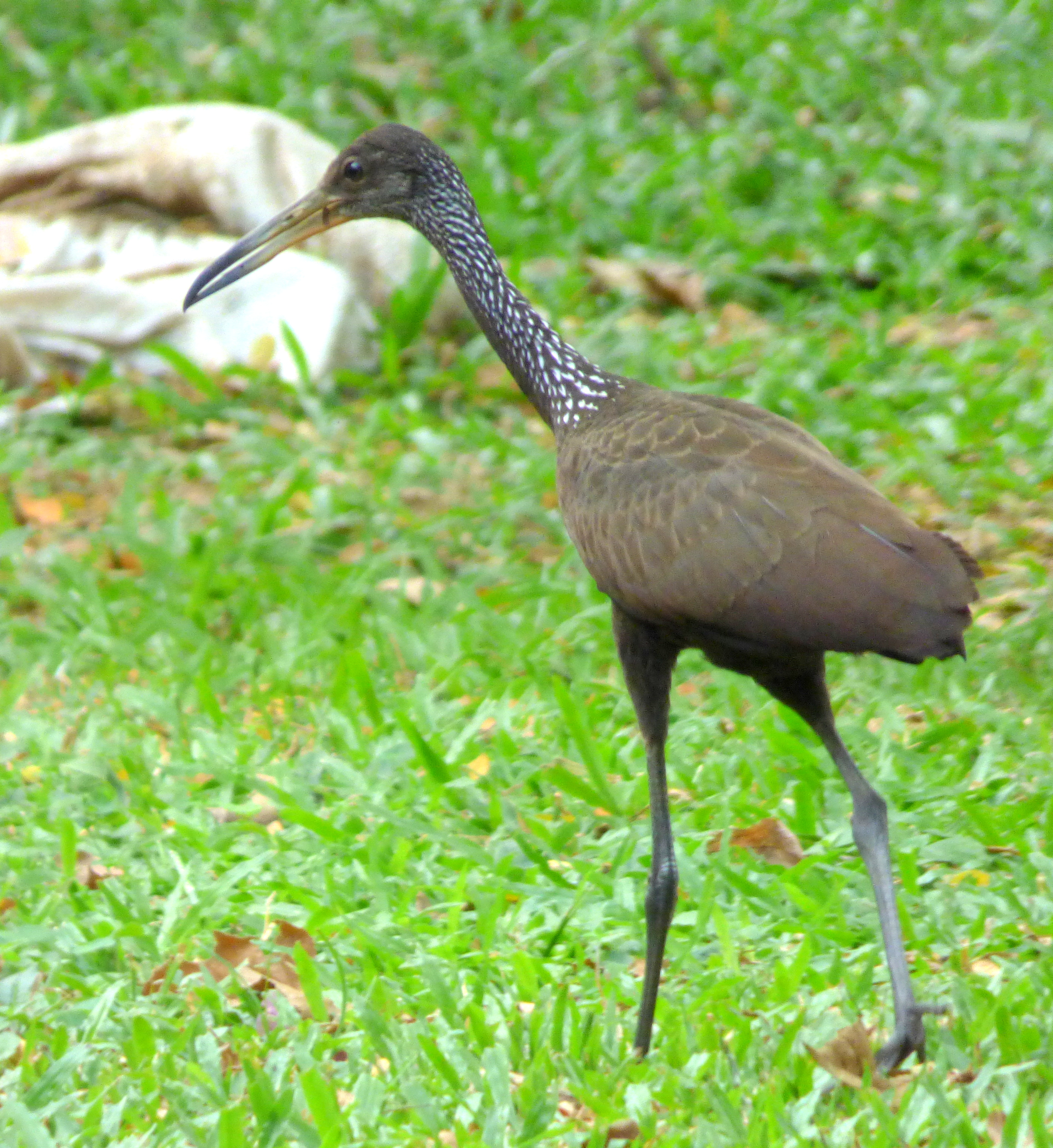
- Limpkin (Aramus guarauna)

Scientific classification
- Kingdom: Animalia
- Phylum: Chordata
- Class: Aves
- Order: Gruiformes
- Family: Aramidae; Bonaparte, 1854
- Genus: Aramus; Vieillot, 1816

Species
- Aramus guarauna; †Aramus paludigrus

= Aramus (bird) =

Aramus Temporal range: Miocene - Recent

Genus of bird

Aramus is the sole extant genus of the family Aramidae. The limpkin (Aramus guarauna) is the only living member of this group, although other species are known from the fossil record, such as Aramus paludigrus from the Middle Miocene.
