= Eunectes stirtoni =

Eunectes stirtoni Temporal range: Mid Miocene (Laventan) ~13.8–11.8 Ma

Scientific classification
- Domain: Eukaryota
- Kingdom: Animalia
- Phylum: Chordata
- Class: Reptilia
- Order: Squamata
- Suborder: Serpentes
- Family: Boidae
- Genus: Eunectes
- Species: E. stirtoni

Binomial name
- Eunectes stirtoni Hoffstetter & Rage 1977

Extinct species of snake

Eunectes stirtoni is an extinct species of anaconda that lived during the Middle Miocene (Laventan) in the area of the present-day Tatacoa Desert. Fossils of the species have been found in the Honda Group at La Venta, Colombia. The validity of this species has been called into question.

== See also ==
- Eunectes beniensis
- Eunectes deschauenseei
- Green anaconda
- Yellow anaconda
