= Richard Kay (anthropologist) =

American paleontologist and anthropologist

Richard Frederick Kay (born October 21, 1947, in New York, New York) is an American paleontologist and anthropologist.

Kay is professor of Evolutionary Anthropology and Earth and Ocean Sciences, Nicholas School of the Environment (secondary) at Duke University. He received his bachelor's degree (anthropology and zoology) from the University of Michigan (1969) and his M.Phil. (1971) and Ph.D. (1973) in geology from Yale University. He served as chair of the Department of Biological Anthropology and Anatomy (Duke) from 1988 until 2003. His scientific interests include the study of functional anatomy and adaptations of Primates, and primate evolution. Since 1983, he has conducted collaborative paleontology research in South America. He has edited six scientific books about primate evolution and the fauna and geology of South America. He is the namesake for "Kay's threshold" (500 grams as the upper limit for an insectivorous diet and the lower limit for a foliovorous one) due to his 1984 paper On the use of anatomical features to infer foraging behavior in extinct primates.

He was elected a fellow of the American Association for the Advancement of Science in 2007 and was given Paleontological Recognition Award by the Museo Nacional de Historia Natural, Bolivia, in May 1999, and the Dr. Luis Federico Leloir Prize for International Cooperation in Science, Technology and Innovation. Argentina Ministry of Science, Technology and Productive Innovation. He was the Gordon Getty Laureate for 2020.
