= Huilabradys =

Huilabradys Temporal range: Middle Miocene (Laventan) ~13.8–11.8 Ma

Scientific classification
- Kingdom: Animalia
- Phylum: Chordata
- Class: Mammalia
- Order: Pilosa
- Family: †Nothrotheriidae
- Subfamily: †Nothrotheriinae
- Genus: †Huilabradys; Villarroel, 1998
- Species: †H. magdaleniensis

Binomial name
- †Huilabradys magdaleniensis Villarroel 1998

Extinct genus of ground sloths

Huilabradys is an extinct genus of ground sloths of the family Nothrotheriidae that lived in what is now Colombia. Huilabradys was discovered in the strata of the La Tatacoa desert in the Huila department, in the Villavieja Formation, and is part of the so-called La Venta fauna, a fossiliferous location from the mid-Miocene period that has provided a notable paleontological contribution on the Miocene faunas of northern South America. The remains discovered are basically fragments of the jaws and teeth, allowed the identification of this species, whose only species is Huilabradys magdaleniensis, and was classified as a member of the nothrotheriid subfamily Nothrotheriinae, which comprises small to medium-sized species of ground sloths.

== Etymology ==
The genus name, Huilabradys, is derived from the Huila Department in Colombia and bradys meaning "slow". The specific name refers to the Magdalena River where the holotype was found.

== Description ==
Huilabradys is a medium-sized species, similar in size to the Argentine species Pronothrotherium mirabilis, characterized by a very high mandibular ramus and characteristics of its molariform teeth, such as the lack of a diastema between the first and second molars and the oblique location of the fourth molars.

Huilabradys is one of many ground sloths present in the La Venta area. Additional remains found in the area suggest the presence of other nothrotheriines as unidentified species that could belong to the genera Hapalops and Eucholoeops, previously known from Argentina and Bolivia, along with a species of mylodontid sloth Magdalenabradys. The remains of these sloths show that at this time the nothrotheres were already differentiated from the megatheres and possessed the characteristics that would identify them in later times.
