= Protautoga =

Protautoga Temporal range: Mid Miocene ~13.65–11.6 Ma

Scientific classification
- Domain: Eukaryota
- Kingdom: Animalia
- Phylum: Chordata
- Class: Actinopterygii
- Order: Labriformes
- Family: Labridae
- Genus: †Protautoga; Leidy 1873

Species
- P. conidens Leidy 1873 (type); P. longidens Alessandri 1896

Extinct genus of fishes

Protautoga is an extinct genus of prehistoric ray-finned fish, that lived in the Middle Miocene. Fossils have been found in the Paraná Formation of Argentina and the Calvert Formation of Virginia, USA.

== See also ==
- Prehistoric fish
- List of prehistoric bony fish
