= Eastern Venezuela Basin =

Sedimentary basin

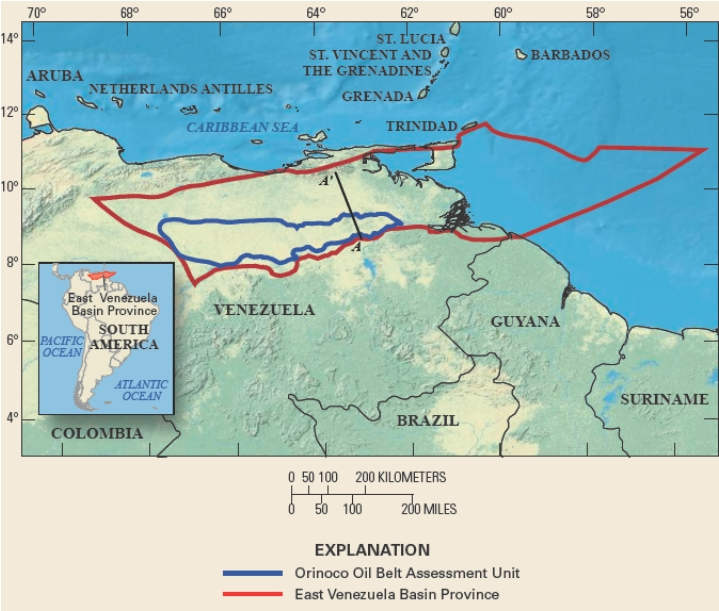
United States Geological Survey map of Eastern Venezuela Basin (red line) and the Orinoco Belt within it (blue line).

The Eastern Venezuela Basin is major sedimentary basin in northeastern Venezuela that contains copious petroleum reserves. The basin lies between several geological structures. To the south it bounds Guiana Shield, to the north metamorphic rocks of the easternmost Andes, to the west the Espino Graben, to the northeast the Barbados accretionary complex and to the east it bounds to the oceanic crust of the Atlantic Ocean.
