= Branisella =

Branisella Temporal range: Late Oligocene (Deseadan) ~26 Ma

Scientific classification
- Kingdom: Animalia
- Phylum: Chordata
- Class: Mammalia
- Order: Primates
- Suborder: Haplorhini
- Family: Cebidae (see text)
- Subfamily: †Branisellinae (see text)
- Genus: †Branisella

Type species
- †Branisella boliviana Hoffstetter, 1969

Extinct genus of monkeys

Branisella is an extinct genus of New World monkey from the Salla Formation of what is now Bolivia during the Late Oligocene, approximately 26 million years ago (Deseadan), comprising only the species Branisella boliviana. Together with the Peruvian genus Canaanimico, it is the oldest fossil New World monkey discovered.

== Classification ==
Within platyrrhines, this taxon has been interpreted as either a stem platyrrhine not related to any of the living forms, or as a primitive callitrichine. One analysis shows it is sister to the clade of all non-pitheciids and should remain incertae sedis. Because, as of 2015, Branisella is the only South American primate taxon known until the Miocene, more fossils are needed before its phylogenetic position can be clearly established.

== Description ==
It was found in Bolivia by the paleontologist Leonardo Branisa, and it was named after him by Hoffstetter, the scientist who first described and classified it in 1969. Morphologically, it is similar to Proteropithecus, an Oligocene primate from Africa, in its reduced upper second premolar and unreduced lower second premolar. This suggests the primitive platyrrhine ancestors of Branisella came to South America from Africa. Other features, however, suggest that it may have been related to the omomyids, an extinct group of tarsier-like primates found in North America, among other places.

Branisella has an estimated body mass of 1,000 g (35 oz). The cheek teeth of Branisella are very high-crowned, suggesting that it might have been somewhat terrestrial, although this hypothesis cannot be confirmed from bones of the postcranial skeleton (there are none). The known dental specimens show extremely heavy and rapid wear and the first molar tooth is far more worn than the last, suggesting that it included abrasive foods in its diet with very poorly developed cutting edges indicating a diet of fruit. One specimen retains a small part of the orbit and indicates that Branisella had small eyes and was diurnal.
