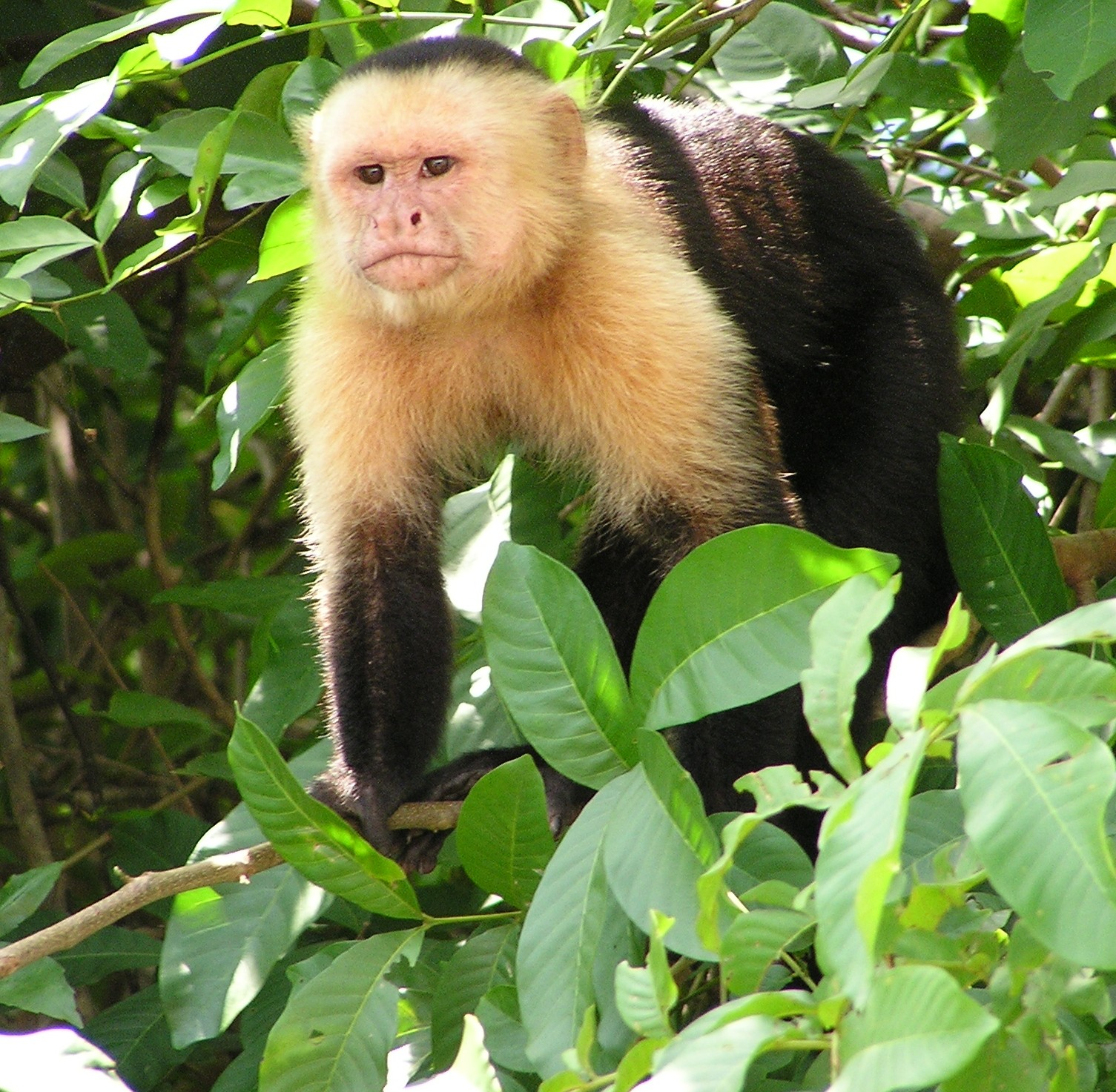
- Panamanian white-faced capuchin (Cebus imitator)

Scientific classification
- Kingdom: Animalia
- Phylum: Chordata
- Class: Mammalia
- Infraclass: Placentalia
- Order: Primates
- Parvorder: Platyrrhini
- Family: Cebidae; Bonaparte, 1831

Type genus
- Cebus Erxleben, 1777

Genera
- Cebus; Saimiri; Sapajus
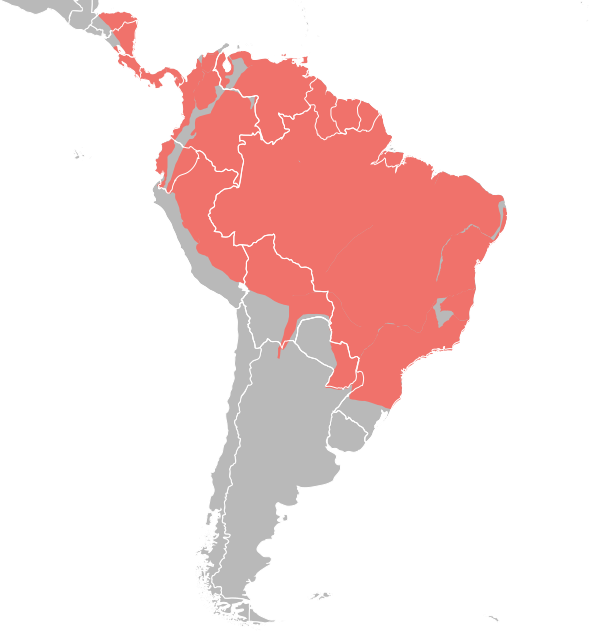
- Cebidae distribution

= Cebidae =

Cebidae Temporal range: Late Oligocene to present

Family of New World monkeys

The Cebidae are one of the five families of New World monkeys now recognised. Extant members are the capuchin and squirrel monkeys. These species are found throughout tropical and subtropical South and Central America.

== Characteristics ==
Cebid monkeys are arboreal animals that only rarely travel on the ground. They are generally small monkeys, ranging in size up to that of the brown capuchin, with a body length of 33 to 56 cm, and a weight of 2.5 to 3.9 kilograms. They are somewhat variable in form and coloration, but all have the wide, flat, noses typical of New World monkeys.

They are omnivorous, mostly eating fruit and insects, although the proportions of these foods vary greatly between species. They have the dental formula:2.1.3.2-32.1.3.2-3

Females give birth to one or two young after a gestation period of between 130 and 170 days, depending on species. They are social animals, living in groups of between five and forty individuals, with the smaller species typically forming larger groups. They are generally diurnal in habit.

== Classification ==
Previously, New World monkeys were divided between Callitrichidae and this family. For a few recent years, marmosets, tamarins, and lion tamarins were placed as a subfamily (Callitrichinae) in Cebidae, while moving other genera from Cebidae into the families Aotidae, Pitheciidae and Atelidae. The most recent classification of New World monkeys again splits the callitrichids off, leaving only the capuchins and squirrel monkeys in this family.

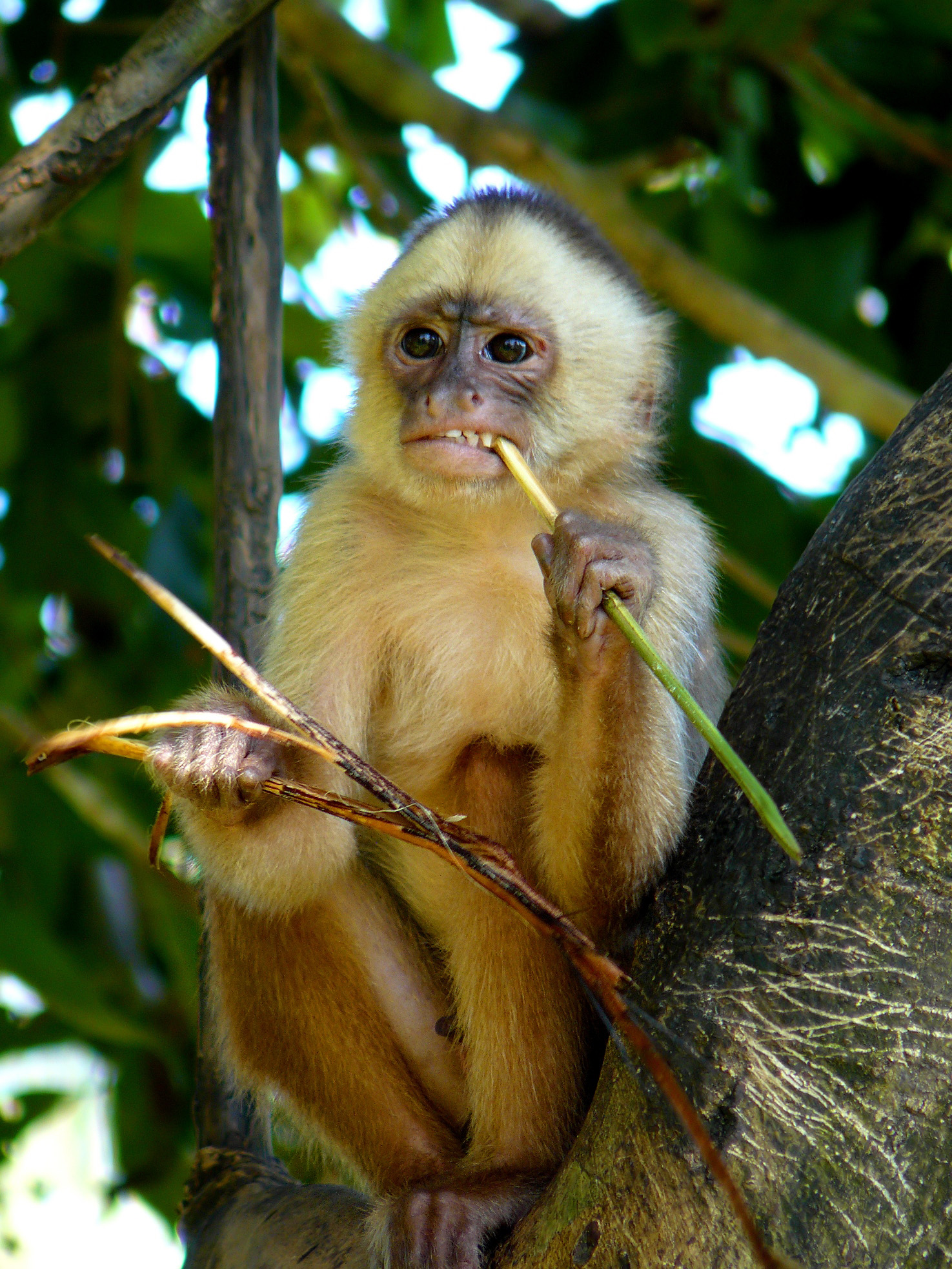
White-fronted capuchin (Cebus albifrons)

- Subfamily Cebinae (capuchin monkeys)
  - Genus Cebus (gracile capuchin monkeys)
    - Colombian white-faced capuchin or Colombian white-headed capuchin, Cebus capucinus
    - Panamanian white-faced capuchin or Panamanian white-headed capuchin, Cebus imitator
    - Marañón white-fronted capuchin, Cebus yuracus
    - Shock-headed capuchin, Cebus cuscinus
    - Spix's white-fronted capuchin, Cebus unicolor
    - Humboldt's white-fronted capuchin, Cebus albifrons
    - Guianan weeper capuchin, Cebus olivaceus
    - Chestnut capuchin, Cebus castaneus
    - Ka'apor capuchin, Cebus kaapori
    - Venezuelan brown capuchin, Cebus brunneus
    - Sierra de Perijá white-fronted capuchin, Cebus leucocephalus
    - Río Cesar white-fronted capuchin, Cebus cesare
    - Varied white-fronted capuchin, Cebus versicolor
    - Santa Marta white-fronted capuchin, Cebus malitiosus
    - Ecuadorian white-fronted capuchin, Cebus aequatorialis
  - Genus Sapajus (robust capuchin monkeys)
    - Tufted capuchin, Sapajus apella
    - Blond capuchin, Sapajus flavius
    - Black-striped capuchin, Sapajus libidinosus
    - Azaras's capuchin, Sapajus cay
    - Black capuchin, Sapajus nigritus
    - Crested capuchin, Sapajus robustus
    - Golden-bellied capuchin, Sapajus xanthosternos
- Subfamily Saimiriinae (squirrel monkeys)
  - Genus Saimiri
    - Bare-eared squirrel monkey, Saimiri ustus
    - Black squirrel monkey, Saimiri vanzolinii
    - Black-capped squirrel monkey, Saimiri boliviensis
    - Central American squirrel monkey, Saimiri oerstedi
    - Guianan squirrel monkey, Saimiri sciureus
    - Humboldt's squirrel monkey, Saimiri cassiquiarensis
    - Collins' squirrel monkey, Saimiri collinsi

== Extinct taxa ==
- Genus Panamacebus
  - Panamacebus transitus
- Subfamily Cebinae
  - Genus Acrecebus
    - Acrecebus fraileyi
  - Genus Killikaike
    - Killikaike blakei
  - Genus Dolichocebus
    - Dolichocebus gaimanensis
  - Genus Migmacebus
    - Species Migmacebus juruaensis
- Subfamily Saimiriinae
  - Genus Saimiri
    - Saimiri fieldsi
    - Saimiri annectens
  - Genus Patasola
    - Patasola magdalenae
