= La Venta (Colombia) =

Fossil locality in Colombia

Coordinates: 3.3000°N 75.1000°W

La Venta is a fossil locality located in the modern departments of Tolima and Huila in Colombia. This site is one of the richest Neogene fossil assemblages in South America and represents the best-known Cenozoic fossil site outside of Argentina. It provides a glimpse of what life in the region was like before the main wave of the Great American Interchange.

== Geology ==
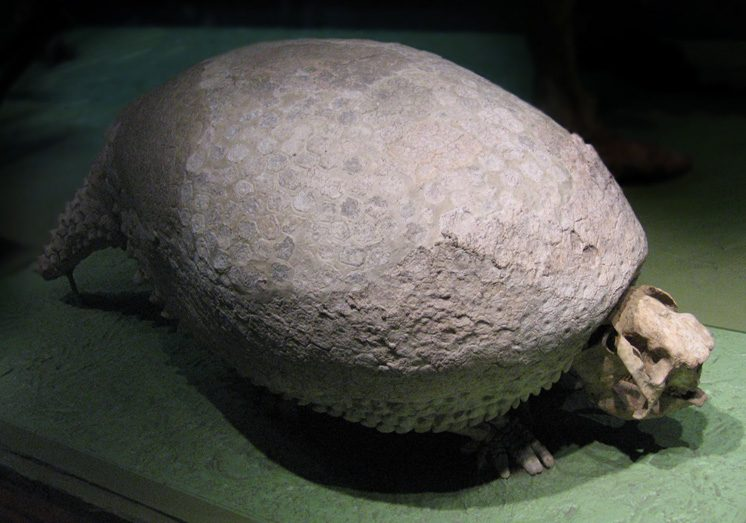
Most glyptodonts – like this one – have been found in Patagonia, but they lived at La Venta too.

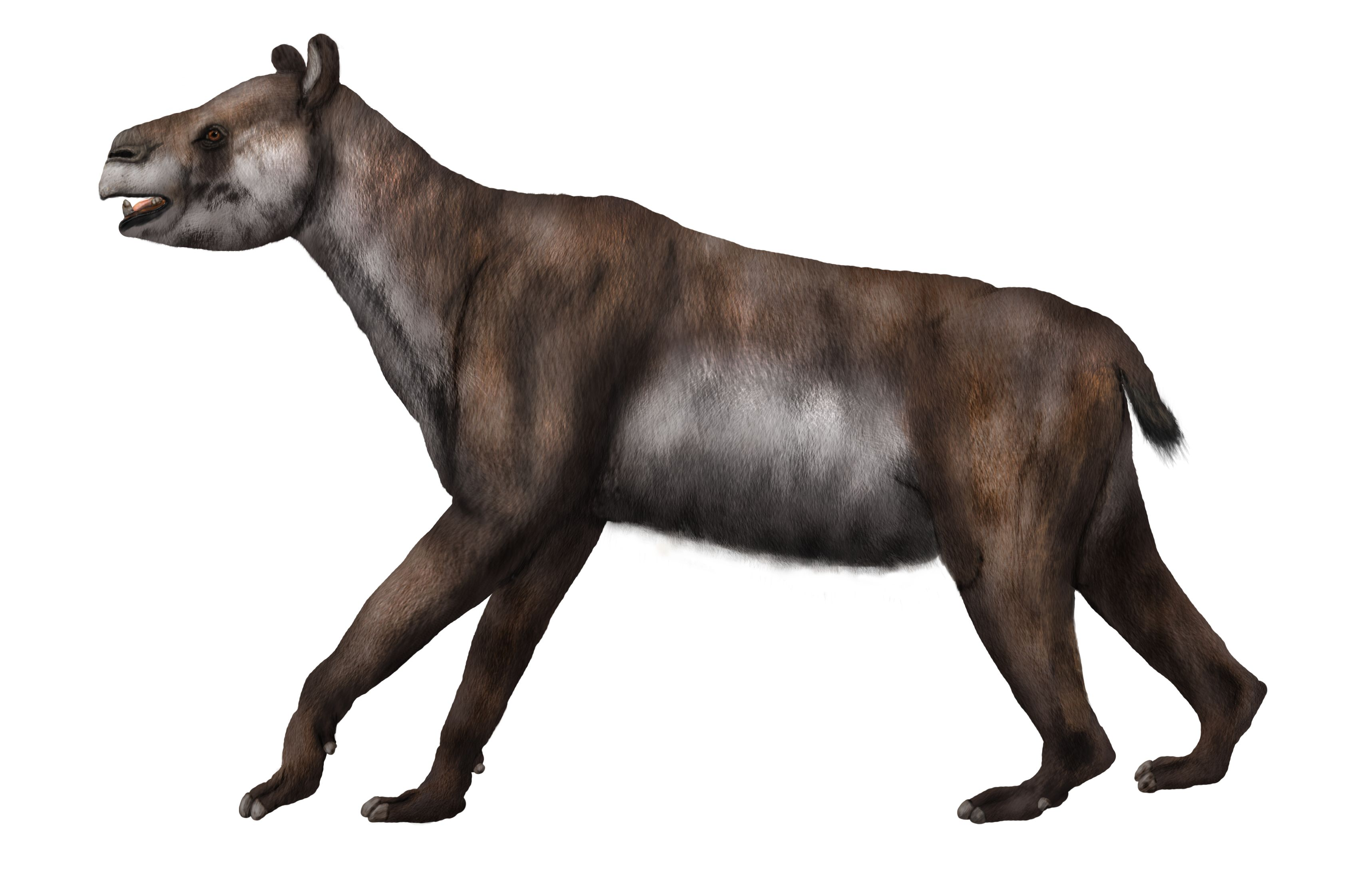
Huilatherium pluriplicatum.

The fossils occur in Middle Miocene rocks of the Honda Group, which is divided into the younger Villavieja Formation and the older La Victoria Formation. The La Venta fauna contained ancient species of animal genera and families still alive today, as well as some entirely extinct prehistoric lineages. These animals lived some 13.8 to 12 million years ago in the Laventan age, which was named after La Venta. At that time, the climate of the region was wetter than today and there was much forest of trees similar (and probably related) to the sapino (Goupia glabra) of our time.

=== List of fauna ===
Fossil animals found at La Venta include:

- Freshwaters fishes, including remains of fishes of the families like Anostomidae, Osteoglossidae (arapaimas), Characidae, Pimelodidae, Callichthyidae, Ariidae, Doradidae, Loricariidae, Cichlidae and the river stingrays Potamotrygonidae.
- A fossil of an anuran amphibian was classified in the current species Rhinella marina (cane toad).
- Freshwater turtles like Podocnemis pritchardi, Podocnemis medemi and Chelus colombiana, along the terrestrial tortoise Geochelone hesterna.
- Anilid snakes (Colombophis) and the primitive anaconda Eunectes stirtoni.
- A lizard, Paradracaena colombiana.
- Several types of crocodylomorphs: perhaps the earliest record of the extant Broad-snouted Caiman, possibly the prehistoric Caiman lutescens. Also a species of the giant caiman Purussaurus, P. neivensis, the bizarre Mourasuchus, the mysterious species Balanerodus logimus, the gharial Gryposuchus colombianus, a false-gharial crocodile Charactosuchus fieldsi and the terrestrial sebecid Langstonia.
- Several types of birds, like the cuculiform Hoazinoides magdalenae, the jacamar Galbula hylochoreutes, the limpkin Aramus paludigrus, an unnamed species of Anhinga, and an unnamed species of giant Phorusrhacid possibly the largest yet discovered.
- Prehistoric armadillos, like Anadasypus hondanus, Nanoastegotherium prostatum and Pedrolypeutes praecursor.
- One of the earliest known pampatheres, Scirrotherium.
- Several fossils of glyptodonts, including two species of Boreostemma, B. gigantea and B. acostae (formerly including in the genus Asterostemma).
- An anteater, Neotamandua borealis.
- Sloths, like the big Magdalenabradys, and small genera like Brievabradys, Neonematherium and Huilabradys.
- A prehistoric manatee, Potamosiren.
- Several kinds of New World monkeys (Platyrrhini), like the species Cebupithecia sarmientoi, Stirtonia victoriae and S. tatacoensis, Aotus dindensis, Nuciruptor rubricae, Mohanamico, Lagonimico, Patasola and Laventiana.
- Bats (Chiroptera), like the living species of fisher bat Noctilio albiventris and Thyroptera lavali along with extinct species like Potamops mascahehenes, Notonycteris magdalenensis, Notonycteris sucharadeus, Palynephyllum antimaster and Molossus colombiensis.
- Rodents like Scleromys shurmanni, Scleromys colombianus, Olenopsis aequatorialis and Neoreomys huilensis.
- Many species of (South American endemic ungulates), including the astrapotheres Granastrapotherium snorki, Xenastrapotherium kraglievichi, and Hilarcotherium castanedaii; the notoungulates Huilatherium pluriplicatum, Pericotoxodon platygnathus, and Miocochilius anomopodus; and the litopterns Megadolodus, Mesolicaphrium, Villarroelia and an unnamed species of Theosodon.
- Small marsupials like the opossums Thylamys minutus, T. colombianus and Marmosa laventicus, the paucituberculatans Pitheculites chenche and Hondathentes cazador, and the microbiotherian Pachybiotherium minor.
- Several kinds of omnivore and carnivore metatherians that belong to the order Sparassodonta, like the primitive Hondadelphys, the saber-toothed Anachlysictis (family Thylacosmilidae), Lycopsis longirostris, a medium-sized member of the family Prothylacinidae along with its bigger relative, Dukecynus magnus.
