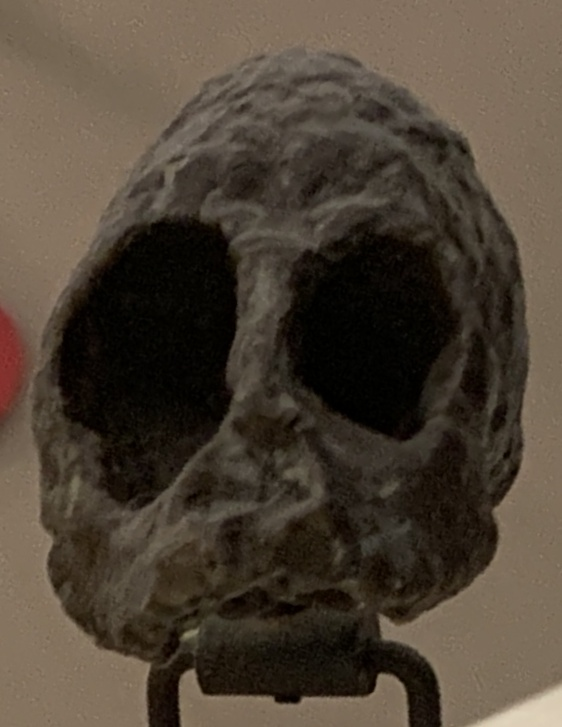
- Skull cast of a specimen collected in Chubut province, Patagonia, Argentina. At the AMNH.

Scientific classification
- Domain: Eukaryota
- Kingdom: Animalia
- Phylum: Chordata
- Class: Mammalia
- Order: Primates
- Suborder: Haplorhini
- Infraorder: Simiiformes
- Family: Cebidae
- Subfamily: Cebinae
- Genus: †Dolichocebus; Bordas, 1942
- Species: †D. gaimanensis

Binomial name
- †Dolichocebus gaimanensis Kraglievich, 1951

= Dolichocebus =

Dolichocebus Temporal range: Early Miocene (Colhuehuapian) ~21.0–17.5 Ma

Extinct genus of monkeys

Dolichocebus is an extinct New World monkey genus that lived in Argentine Patagonia (Sarmiento Formation) from about 21 to 17.5 million years ago during the Early Miocene (Colhuehuapian in the SALMA classification). The type species is D. gaimanensis.
