= Orinoco Basin =

South American drainage basin

- Map of the Orinoco River Basin.
- Country: Venezuela and Colombia

Characteristics
- Area: 990,000 km^{2} (380,000 sq mi)

Geology
- Plate: South American

The Orinoco Basin is the part of South America drained by the Orinoco river and its tributaries. The Orinoco watershed covers an area of about 990,000 km^{2} (380,000 sq mi), making it the third largest in South America, covering most of Venezuela and eastern part of Colombia.

The Orinoco is one of the most important rivers in the world due to its length and flow (2140 km and more than 30000 m^{3}/s), the extent of its basin (1 million km^{2}) and especially its historical importance and economic and the meaning it has had for Venezuela, where most of its basin is spread, with almost two-thirds of it. It is probably the largest river in the world in proportion to the area of its basin, similar in extent to that of the Danube but five times greater in volume. Its discharge is the third largest of any river worldwide, after the Amazon and the Congo, and much greater than that of many rivers of greater length and basin area.

== Geography ==
The Orinoco river basin synthesizes ancient massifs and shields, recently raised (Tertiary) ridges, and tectonic depressions and basins or accumulation plains. The only other countries in the Americas with a similar geological disposition are Canada and the United States. To define the Orinoco basin as a natural region, it is necessary to establish the geographic characteristics that define it, such as extension, relief, climate, hydrography, vegetation, soils, and mineral resources.

=== Extension ===
The Orinoco basin covers an area of almost 989,000 km^{2} (382,000 sq mi) of which 643,480 km^{2} (248,450 sq mi) or slightly more than 65% remain in Venezuelan territory, while the remaining 35% is in Colombian territory in the Colombian Llanos and The eastern slope of the Eastern Cordillera of Colombia, a stretch of the great mountain range of the Andes. This Colombian region is called Orinoquía. Of the part located in Venezuela, just over half extend from the Venezuelan Andes and the Cordillera de la Costa to the north-western bank of the Orinoco River (the left bank), forming most of the Venezuelan plains and the delta Orinoco. The southern part of the basin contains most of the waters that come from the Venezuelan Guiana.

=== Orinoco River Sources ===
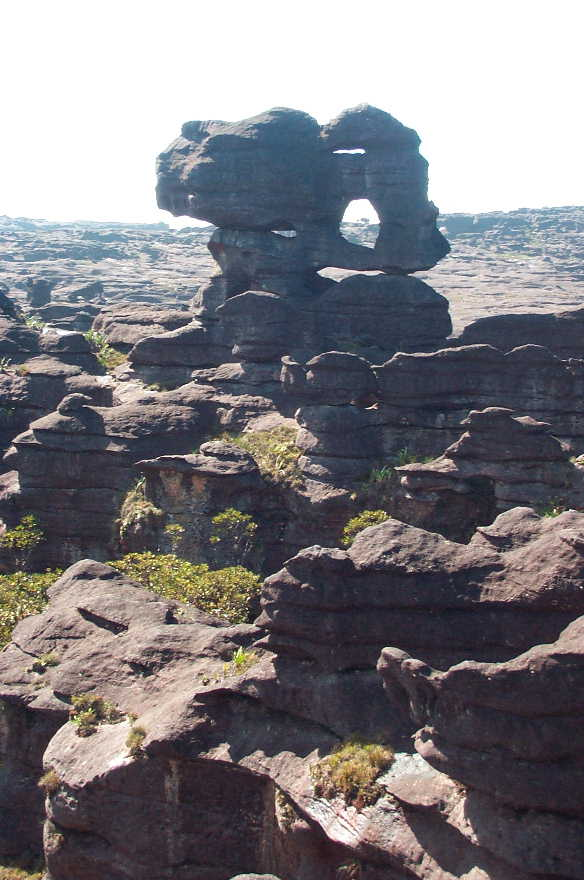
The top of Roraima, the highest Tepui of Venezuelan Guayana. The curious shapes have been produced by erosion.

The sources of the Orinoco River are located at Cerro Carlos Delgado Chalbaud, at 1,047 meters (3,435 ft) above sea level, discovered in 1951 by the Franco-Venezuelan expedition that went back and explored the Upper Orinoco course to the Sierra Parima, headed By Venezuelan army officer Frank Risquez Iribarren. The first reference to this expedition was that of Alberto Contramaestre Torres in 1954. And there are other references to this expedition, for example, that of Pablo J. Anduce. From the birth of the Orinoco at the foot of the hill Delgado Chalbaud (2°19′5″N 63°21′42″W at an altitude of 1047.35 meters) until its opening in the Atlantic Ocean, the Orinoco describes a great arc and its basin extends like fan, reason why the north-western part Of the basin is somewhat more extensive than the south-east.

As already indicated, the two sub-regions of the basin have quite different characteristics, due to differences in their geological constitution. The maximum height of the basin is located in the Sierra Nevada del Cocuy, in Colombia (more than 5000 meters above sea level), which forms part of the Eastern Andean Cordillera of Colombia.

The north-western edge of the basin would consist of the Colombian-Venezuelan Andean slopes and the southern slopes of other mountainous reliefs of northern Venezuela, while the southern edge of the basin would be marked for the most part by the watershed between the Orinoco and the Amazon, which is located on the Guayanés massif. Between the two sides extends the Venezuelan Guayana on the right bank of the Orinoco and the Llanos, both Colombian and Venezuelan on the left bank. As we see, the Orinoco river itself marks the natural boundary between these two regions; it could be said that the Orinoco is one of the most remarkable natural borders in the world, although this fact has a simple explanation: the rivers have little slope and have been building for millions of years a level of accumulation with the sediments that they carry from the mountain ranges where they are born. And it is these sediments that push the channel of the Orinoco against the Guayanese shield itself, to the point that in most of its course, the channel is riding on the rocks of the guayanés shield, as can be seen in Piedra del Medium in front of Ciudad Bolívar (before Angostura). The ancient name of Bolivar City, Angostura of the Orinoco is due to the fact that the rocks of the shield are very resistant to the erosion and presented in that point, a narrowing of about 800 meters (2,600 ft) of width that gave origin to a species of imprisonment during, probably, millions of years, until the river was gradually excavating the channel on granite rocks.

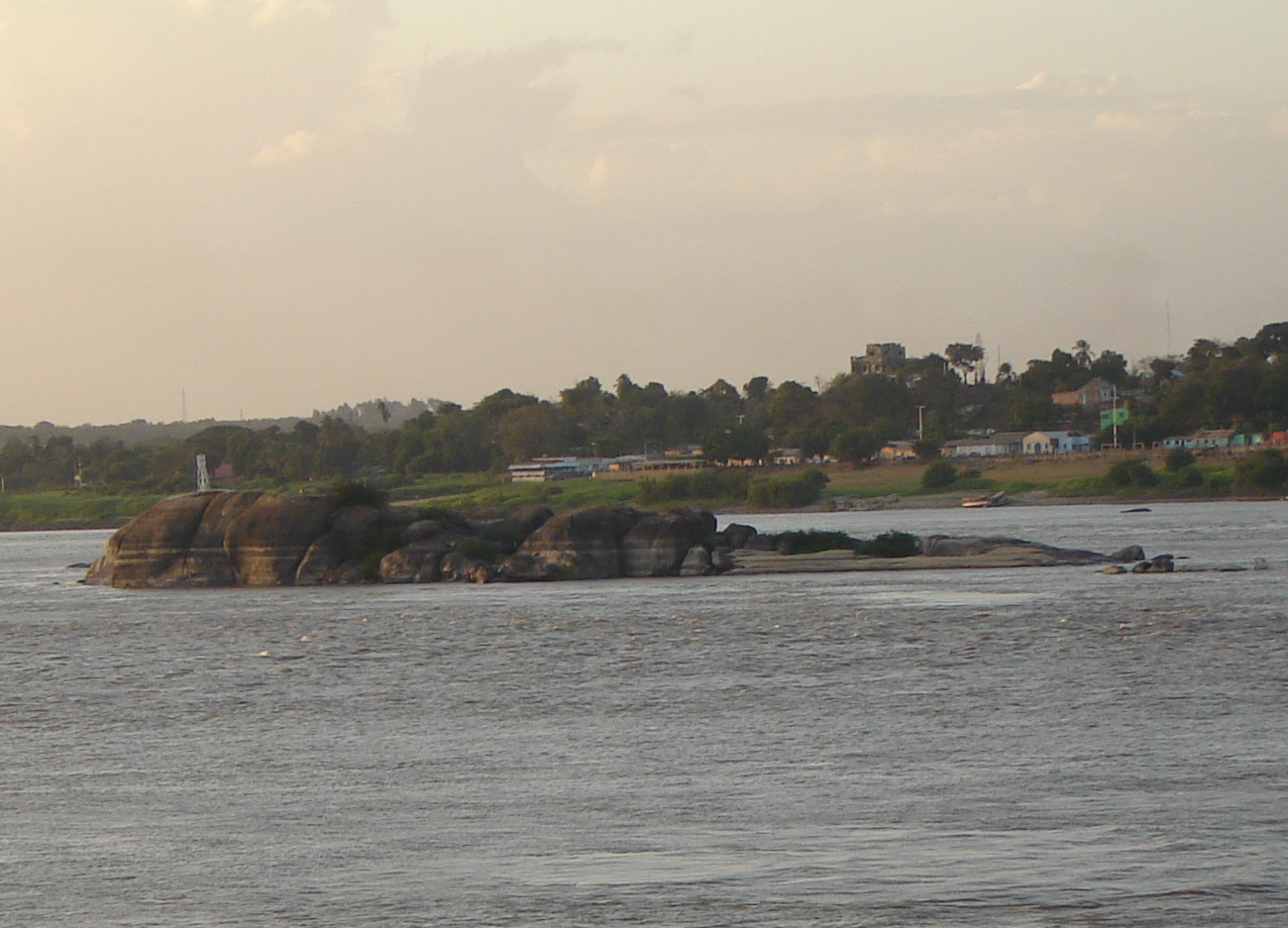
The Piedra del Medio, located in front of Ciudad Bolivar is a kind of nilometer or orino-meter in this case, in which the lines of different coloration indicate the successive levels reached by the water.

Thus, the Venezuelan Guiana constitutes, unlike the Llanos, a surface of erosion. From the combination of these two forces that modify the relief, a constructive one, the sedimentation and another destructive one, the erosion, arises the current situation in which the river marks approximately the limit between the two regions. As can be seen from the above, this limit presents exceptions since, in some sections, rounded hills of granite origin (and therefore, Guayan reliefs) can be seen on the left bank of the Orinoco, that is, on the border of the Llanos. In the stone of the middle, you can see the different levels reached by the waters of the river, expressed in the different coloration of the granite, which explains the value of this granite island as "nilometer" - according to Alejandro de Humboldt. These lines of distinct coloring should not be interpreted as a reduction of river flow over geological time, but as a descent of river level with sediment transport from the bottom to the sea: we recall that the river delta (almost 40,000 km^{2}) was built with these sediments, while granitic rocks (such as Piedra del Medio) have been much more resistant to erosion.

On the other hand, the sandstones of the Venezuelan Guayana (of the Roraima formation) have been transformed into sand by the erosion that, although never very intense by the extra-ordinary resistance of the rocks, has been very durable (more than 1 billion of years), for which the sedimentary cover has been transformed into an inverted relief that forms the Tepuis. Moreover, were it not for the fact that the Guayanese Massif has been suffering a slow and long movement of ascent, in the present time it would have already become a penillanura in which almost all the sedimentary cover of sandstones would have disappeared. The sands coming from this erosive process have been deposited in the left bank of the river, especially in the low plains of Apure state, between the rivers Meta and Apure itself. They were not deposited in the right border because there the relief is higher. And these sands could become over millions of years in strata of sandstones that could also become converted to rise and rejuvenate the relief on plateaus similar to those that now exist in Guyana. This would be a kind of example of the theory of the geographical cycle.

In turn, these sands have come to create a unique eco-system in the world: an extensive dune field (occupies about 30,000 km^{2}) that has the peculiarity that it is not a desert climate but a savanna climate in a landscape of natural pastures that alternate with some gallery forests, flowing rivers and dunes of more than 100 km (62 mi) in length and up to 20 km (12 mi) in height. Some of these dunes are used by the Llanero to establish in them the cheese, that, in addition to processing part of the milk, a group of cattle are being prepared to go to the front of the herd (what in the Llanos denominates the godmother of the herd). They also serve to protect the livestock from floods. Thus, this eco-system so curious and picturesque, is the result of wind modeling in a savannah climate. It is not, as stated in the Atlas of Venezuela. A spatial image (also known as the Atlas of PDVSA, of a paleodunas eco-system formed in an environment with a climate much drier than the present one, but of a mechanism of formation of dunes that only acts during the dry season since. When the level of the waters of the Orinoco falls due to the drought of the rivers, especially those that come from the Llanos, they remain extensive beaches of very fine sand, that the trade winds soon transfer towards the south-east forming what now constitutes the Santos Luzardo National Park, a name taken from one of the main characters in Doña Bárbara's novel by Rómulo Gallegos.

The direction of the winds during the dry season (of the summer as it is said in the Llanos) is on average very constant and with a considerable speed, from the north-east to the south-west, as can be seen in the direction of the elongated dunes in satellite images. This address may vary for a short time but in the long run it is maintained exactly in that direction. In the rainy season (or winter) the direction changes slightly and proceeds practically from the free east. But this is not the most remarkable change, but the decrease of its speed. This is due to the greater humidity that the trade winds bring and to the consequent convection: as the wet winds advance on the savanna they increase of temperature by the heat of the ground due to the solar radiation. In turn, this warming gives rise to the rise of moist air (precisely what we know as convection) and this rise gives rise, in turn, to a decrease in the speed of the winds and the increase of precipitation. So the mechanism of the winds and that of the accumulation of the sands from the Guayanese Massif are almost opposite and this opposition has been favorable for the establishment of agricultural activities in the Llanos: the dunes can become covered with vegetation and serve. The basis for the establishment of houses, herds and roads, and this process becomes more noticeable to the west, not only by the decrease of the speed of the winds as they move in that direction but also because the sands they form. These dunes come from the beaches of the Orinoco and the transport of the same diminishes when the speed of the wind descends. Fernando Calzadilla Valdés explains all this process in the central part of the Apure state, where he begins what he calls the Alto Llano, although this concept is not established with a certain level that throughout the Apure is very low until reaching the true piedmont of the Andes (established modern, this yes, in the curve of level of the 200 altitude.

=== Climate ===
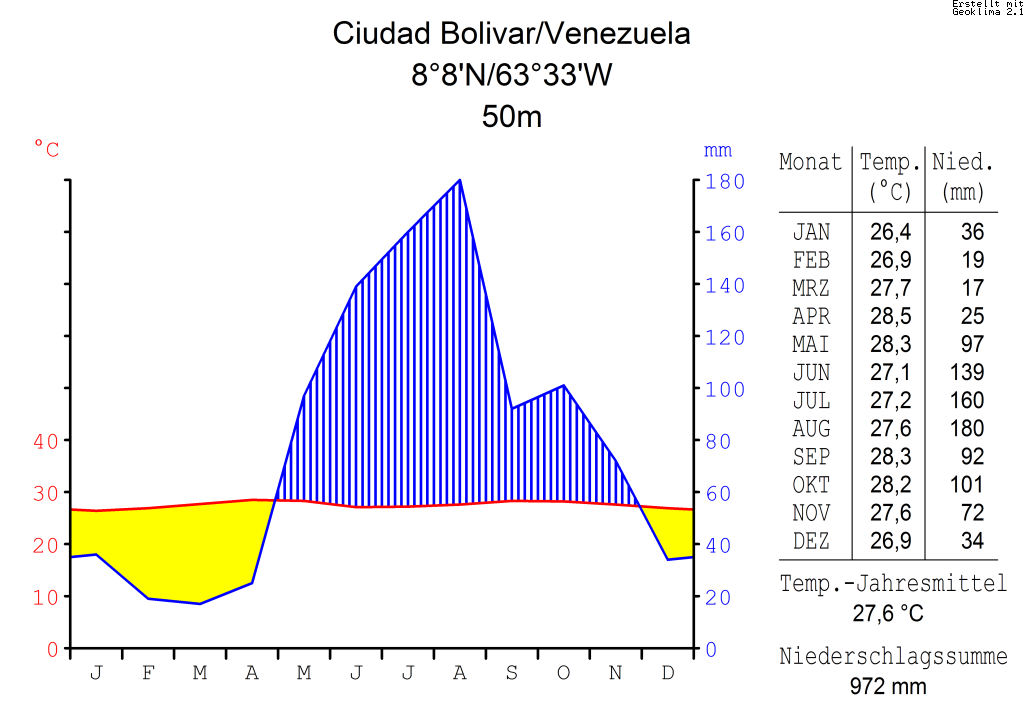
Climograph of Ciudad Bolívar. Rains are indicated in mm and temperatures in °C.

Across the Orinoco basin, climates are isothermal, i.e., climates with few temperature variations throughout the year (the difference between the average temperature of the warmer months and the less warm months is only 3°C), as corresponds to the inter-tropical zone. Five major types of climate in the lowlands (up to 800 m above sea level, according to the considerations of Anton W. Goldbrunner), which are the jungle climate (Af in the Köppen classification), savanna (Aw in the same climatic classification), the semi-desert and the desert proper. It is disputed whether there is a monsoon climate (according to the Köppen nomenclature) in the Orinoco basin, which would become the fifth type of climate. In any case, the existence of this climate would be reduced to the Atlantic coast of the Orinoco delta, where the influence of the northern equatorial current (which here is practically a coastal drift) influences to make the rains much more important On the whole coast common to the Guianas and Venezuela, but that diminish abruptly in Venezuela when advancing inland. At higher altitudes four or five thermal, climatic, biotic or ecological floors can be distinguished according to criteria used by different authors and their interest in their field of research. Temperatures have a very limited annual amplitude (about 3°C or less), although their daily amplitude is much higher and around 10°C. Rainfall is high, especially in Venezuelan Guayana, where it reaches very high values (4000 mm or more) in some fairly extensive areas. In Los Llanos, rainfall is much lower (1500 to 2000 mm, with an elevation of this amount towards the foothills of the Andes) and gives rise to the presence of savanna vegetation, with gallery forests next to the rivers, and in the Andean piedmont, tropophile forests, which lose much of their leaves during the dry season. The climate chart of Ciudad Bolívar shows the behavior of rains (blue line) and temperature (red line). The shading in yellow indicates the season or season of drought (deficit of precipitations, according to the xerothermic index of Gaussen). However, Ciudad Bolívar's climate is not representative of the entire Orinoco basin, but is rather an anomaly, in the sense that, because of its location with respect to the prevailing winds (by the action of mountains north-eastern Venezuela and the plateaus of the south-east) and this city being somewhat distant from the sea (the influence of the rainfall of the coastal drift in the Venezuelan Atlantic coasts), the precipitations are quite smaller than they should be.

==== Climate for Santa Elena de Uairén ====
- Current climate conditions for Santa Elena de Uairén (Bolivar state):
  - Location: 4°36′N 61°6′W, altitude, 910 mm.
  - Temperature: January (21.6°C), February (22°C), March (22.5°C), April (22.3°C), May (22°C), June (21.5°C), July (21.5°C), August (21.5°C), September (22°C), October (22.1°C), November (22°C), December (21.8°C). Average annual temperature: 21.8°C.
  - Precipitation: January (72 mm), February (83 mm), March (92 mm), April (134 mm), May (248 mm), June (251 mm), July (219 mm), August (171 mm) September (116 mm), October (102 mm), November (119 mm), December (132 mm). Annual rainfall: 1739 mm

==== Climate for San Carlos de Río Negro ====
- Climatic data of San Carlos de Río Negro, Amazonas State, in Venezuelan Guiana, with Af climate in the climatic typology of Köppen.
  - Location: 1°55′N 68°36′W, altitude: 110 mm
  - Average temperatures in degrees C: January (26.3°), February (26.3°), March (26.5°), April (25.9°), May (25.6°), June (25.7°), July (25.4°), August (25.9°), September (26.6°), October (26.7°), November (26.7°), December (26.2°). Average annual temperature: 26.2°.
  - Rainfall in mm: January (222 mm), February (229 mm), March (206 mm), April (395 mm), May (381 mm), June (390 mm), July (330 mm), August (328 mm), September (249 mm), October (257 mm), November (314 mm), December (220 mm). Annual rainfall: 3521 mm

=== Hydrography ===
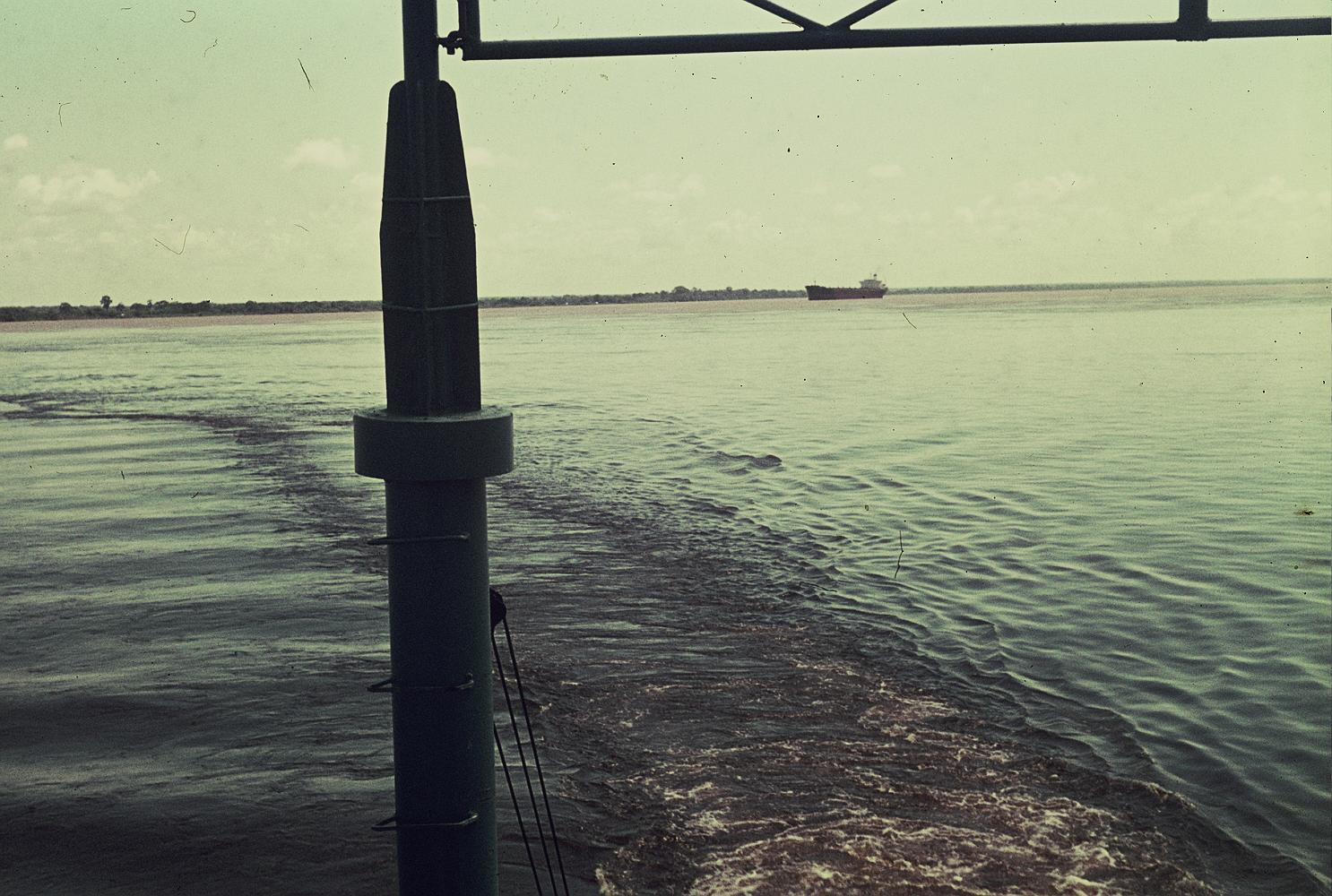
Confluence of the Caroní in the Orinoco, whose waters are distinguished by the different coloration, whiter in the Orinoco (in the background) and darker in the foreground (Caroni waters). The different width of the fringes is an optical effect by the distance, that of the Orinoco being much greater.

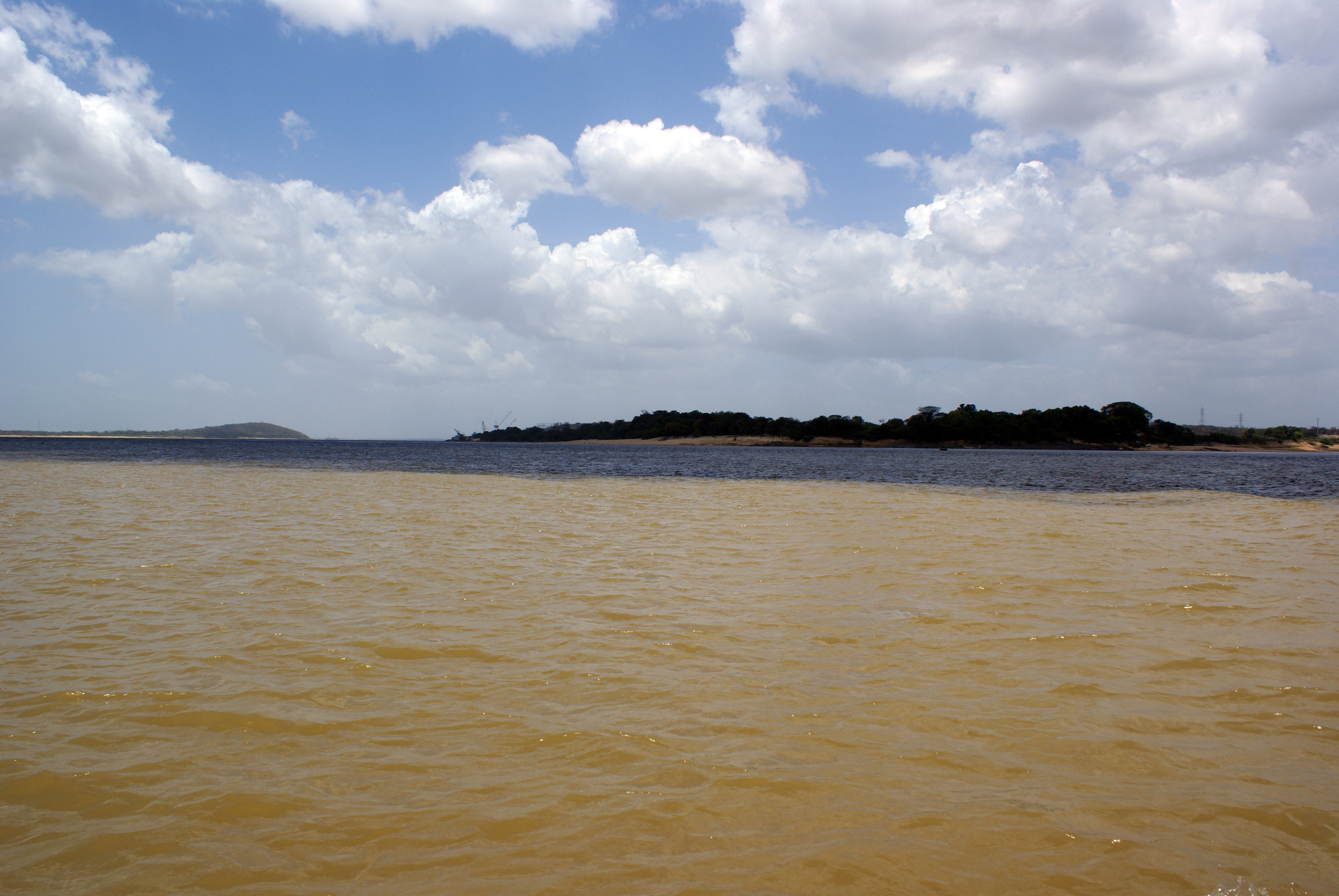
Union of the waters of the Orinoco with the Caroní, in the background. The two stripes can be seen by the different coloration of the two rivers.

The Orinoco, with its tributaries, constitutes an extensive hydrographic network with rivers very flowing and of considerable length. Of all its basin, the longest tributary is the Guaviare, longer (about 1550 km) than the Orinoco itself at the point of its confluence, while the largest is the Caroni. Many of its tributaries are navigable rivers, especially those on the left bank, which come from the Llanos, both Colombian and Venezuelan, while the Guayan rivers (tributaries on the right bank) are more flowing but with jumps and rains, which make them very useful in the production of hydro-electric energy, but without use as navigational routes, except for some very short stretches. There are numerous islands, both rocky (erosion reliefs) and sedimentary (sand and other sediments), as well as many pipes or arms, abandoned meanders and horseshoe lakes.

The main tributaries on the right bank are the Manaviche, Ocamo, Padamo (with its Matacuni tributary on its left bank), Cunucunuma, Ventuari (very flowing river, with its Manapiare tributary on the right), Sipapo with its tributaries Autana and Cuao, both on the right), Samariapo, Parguaza (with several tributaries with a curious bayonet drainage), Suapure, Cuchivero river (with its tributary Guaniamo, on the left bank, a river where the gold has been exploited for a long time), the Caura (with its Erebato tributary on its left bank), a very flowing river and with one of the most notable leaps of Guayana (not so much because of its height but Caudal), the Pará jump, the Aro and finally the Caroní with its tributary the Paragua, dammed both rivers in the Necoima Canyon or Necuima, in a hydro-electric dam more than 200 m (660 ft) high that originates a reservoir, the Lake of Guri, with more than 4,000 km^{2} (1,500 sq mi) of surface, which defines it as one of the most valuable and productive rivers in the world: to date, the production of the Guri hydro-electric power station is only surpassed by the Itaipú hydro-electric power station, in the Paraná River. In the Cuao river basin (except for the long, or horseshoe-shaped lagoons formed by some abandoned meanders), the only lagoon in the basin: the lagoon of King Leopold, so named because it was discovered during an expedition sponsored by King Leopold III Of Belgium a little more than 50 years ago (at the moment it is very easy to observe it through programs with satellite images, generally of free access in Internet). This lagoon is about 400 m (1,300 ft) long by 270 m (890 ft) wide, approximately. It is the only lagoon in Venezuelan Guiana, which confirms the irregular nature of the relief of this natural region, which is not favorable to them, and also contradicts the myth of the sixteenth century, of the existence of a huge lake (Lake Parima) from which the Orinoco and Amazon rivers were born, with almost all its tributaries.

On the left bank is the Mavaca, the unique case in the Casiquiare world (which is not a tributary but, on the contrary, an effluent, that is to say, a derivation of the Orinoco that drains its waters towards the Amazon basin through the Negro River), the Atabapo, the four rivers that come from the Colombian territory, which are the Guaviare (with its tributary the Inírida), Vichada, Tomo and Meta. And again in Venezuelan territory, the Apurean rivers to the north of the Meta: Cinaruco, Capanaparo, Arauca and Apure, the latter with numerous tributaries on its left bank gathered in two great rivers, the Portuguesa and Guárico. And some rivers also llaneros of minor importance and caudal, like the Manapire, Iguana, Zuata and Pao. Finally, the Caño Manamo will end up in the Orinoco delta, the Taiga with its tributary by its right margin, the Long Morichal and the Guanipa with its tributary by its left bank, the Amana.

Each of the named tributaries of the Orinoco River deserves a more detailed study. Also, some problems that are scarcely investigated, such as the different coloration of the waters of these tributaries, as seen in the image, the phenomenon of the lack of cloudiness in the mornings in the mountiest rivers (a phenomenon that is briefly explained in the articles on the Venezuelan Guayana, in the Amazon river and especially in the article on diathermy), the great extension of dunes or dunes in the Apure state, which is located between the Cinaruco, Capanaparo, Arauca and the own rivers Apure, the comparison of the flow between the different tributaries and between the Guaviare and the Orinoco and others, are also issues that deserve separate treatment, something more detailed than the one that is included later in the documentary study of the basin of the great river Columbia-Venezuelan.

=== Flora ===
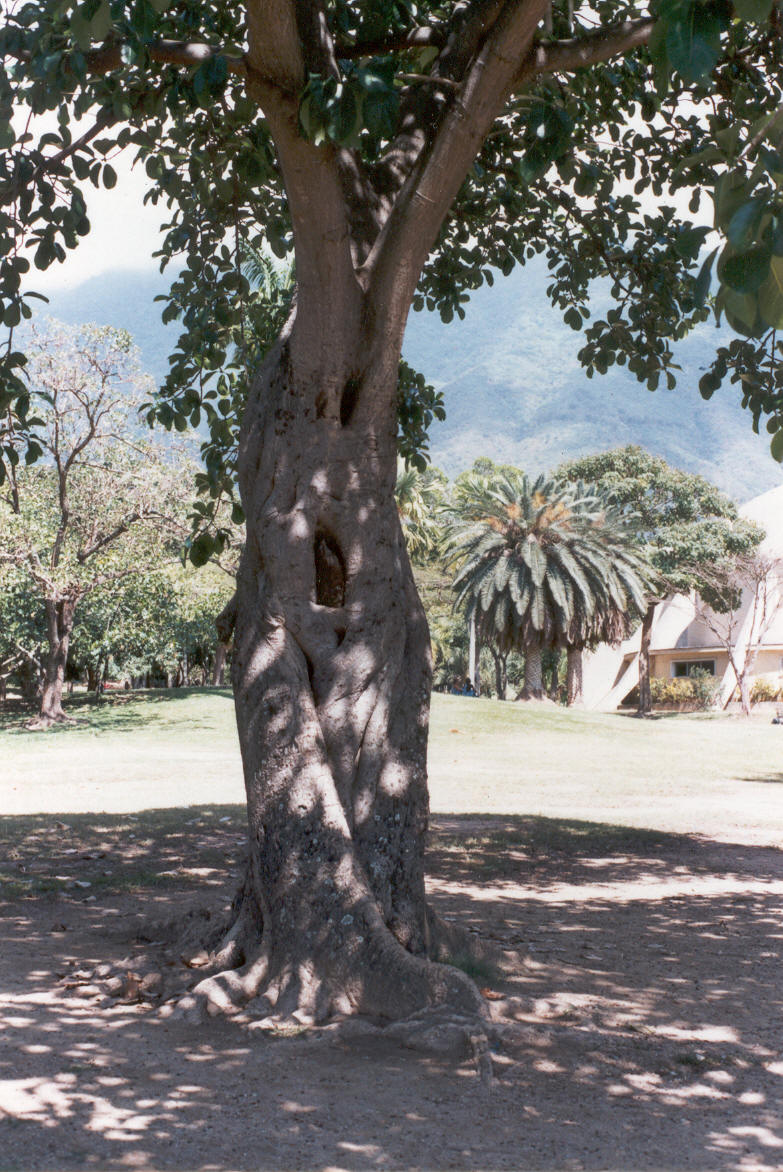
Matapalo or fig tree showing in an opening part of the trunk of the tree on which it supported. Parque del Este, Caracas, Venezuela.

In the Guayana part of the Orinoco basin, the equatorial forests predominate, characterized by the existence of several levels of trees of very varied species, as a consequence of a high competition to obtain a sufficient supply of solar rays.

This struggle for sunlight is exemplified by the presence of matapalos, trees that originally have a creeping stalk that they use to lean around a large tree in order to reach sunlight. When they overcome the roof and increase the function of photosynthesis they begin to grow strangling the tree on which they had leaned (as well as blocking the sunlight). The most frequent matapalos belong to the genus Ficus, as is the case of natural rubber. The peculiar note of these jungles is the extra-ordinary variety of the vegetation: many vegetal species per hectare, but few copies of each one in that surface. The other distinguishing note is the enormous annual biomass production: about 500 t/yr/ha, against about 300 in the coniferous forests of the Taiga area in the northern hemisphere, under the most favorable conditions. And it is this extra-ordinary diversity that makes it the most useful type of vegetation that exists, especially for its possibilities and for the production of oxygen, although this diversity presents a limitation as far as its commercial exploitation is concerned.

The jungles of the inter-tropical zone constitute the biggest vegetable lung of the planet since all the vegetables need to absorb an enormous amount of water and CO_{2} to produce, through photosynthesis, the carbohydrates that they need for their growth, but they also leave an enormous amount of free oxygen that animals use for their respiration. In the very long term, the balance between production and consumption of both oxygen and CO_{2} tends to be balanced, according to Lavoisier's principle that matter is not created or destroyed, but only transformed. But for millions of years (since the primary era, when the first plant species appeared on our planet) has accumulated an enormous amount of biomass on the earth's surface (and also in the subsoil as hydrocarbons), where it usually there is a close correspondence between production and consumption that fluctuates over time in a process of equilibrium. This means that, as a whole, the balance between production and consumption, both oxygen and carbon dioxide, follows an eternal process of feedback that is responsible for reaching at a given moment a situation of climax, a concept that will need, with time, be revised. We must not forget that, in nature, the number of producers (plants) is much higher than that of consumers (animals).

Of course, this does not mean that the geographic environment (soil, vegetation, fauna, pollutant production) can continue to be depleted without restrictions until reaching irreversible situations. On the other hand, it must be taken into account that ecological problems vary widely at local or regional level: what can be a balancing situation on a global scale does not mean that there are no problems at other scales. What has to be taken into account is that the capacity of regeneration and restoration of the balance lost in the vegetation of the inter-tropical zone, on the one hand, is much greater than what people (including scientists) assume and on the other hand that, in parallel with the processes of desertification due to the poor management of the environment and the depletion of many natural resources, there is a continuous advance in the use and rescue for reforestation and for the cultivation of previously uncultivated and unproductive areas that have giving rise to overproduction in many orders with regard to food, especially in the intertropical zone.

On the other hand, the use of the enormous amount of vegetal species for the obtaining of medicinal products has an enormous potentiality, that will only be widened to the extent that is better known. The drink known as Amargo de Angostura, for example, is an example of the development of a tonic developed in the Angostura of the Orinoco (now Ciudad Bolivar) that was very useful since the nineteenth century because, although with a composition created by Johann Gottlieb Benjamin Siegert, and which has always been kept in the greatest secrecy until today, is known to contain among its ingredients quina (hence the bitter taste) and sarrapia, vegetables whose medicinal principles have been perfectly proven for more than three centuries.

In addition to the vegetation of the equatorial forest, in the Llanos, which share Venezuela and Colombia, savannas predominate, grasses of seasonal pastures, with gallery forests, woods (small clusters isolated from trees) and estuaries with palms (palma llanera, especialmente), etc.

== See also ==
- Keyhole cichlid
- Sabana Surinam toad
- Physiographic regions of the world

== Bibliography ==
- DE LEÓN, Rafael y RODRÍGUEZ DÍAZ, Alberto J. El Orinoco aprovechado y recorrido. Caracas: Ministerio de Obras Públicas y Corporación Venezolana de Guayana (M.O.P. - C.V.G.), 1976. Uncopyrighted edition.
- FERRARO, Carlos y LENTINO, Miguel. Venezuela, paraíso de aves. Caracas: Armitano Editores, 1992.
- GUMILLA, (Padre) Joseph. El Orinoco ilustrado y defendido. Historia natural, civil y geográfica de este gran río y de sus caudalosas vertientes. Escrito en 1731. Ediciones posteriores: 1745, 1791 y 1882. Versión francesa, 1758. Caracas: Academia Nacional de la Historia, Fuentes para la Historia Colonial de Venezuela, Nº 68, 1963.
- GUMILLA, José. Tribus indígenas del Orinoco. Caracas: Instituto Nacional de Cooperación Educativa (I.N.C.E.), 1968.
- NOVOA, Daniel y RAMOS, Freddy. Las pesquerías comerciales del río Orinoco. Caracas: Corporación Venezolana de Guayana – División de Desarrollo Agrícola. Editora Venegráfica, C.A, 1978. Talleres de Gráficas Los Palos Grandes, C.A., 1972.
- REPÚBLICA DE VENEZUELA. Mediciones en ríos grandes. Caracas: Ministerio de Obras Públicas, 1972.
- RODRÍGUEZ DÍAZ, Alberto J. Desarrollo del eje de navegación Orinoco-Apure-Arauca. Informe preliminar, vol. I. Caracas: MARNR (Ministerio del Ambiente y de los Recursos Naturales Renovables), 1980, 219 p., con bibliografía, más 46 p. (Anexos).
- RODRÍGUEZ DÍAZ, Alberto J. Fronteras de Venezuela. Caracas: 1995.
- VARESCHI, Volkmar. Orinoco arriba. Caracas: Ediciones Lectura, 1959.
- VERNE, Julio. El soberbio Orinoco. La edición original es de 1898. Título original: Le superbe Orénoque. Paris: J. Hetzel et Cie., s. a., con ilustraciones. Edición de gran lujo (411 pp.). Existen varias ediciones en español: Madrid: Saenz de Jubera hermanos, editores (s.a.), 3 cuadernos, ilustrados con grabados (I: 73 pp; II: 67; III: 71 pp.). Barcelona: Editorial Molino, S.A. Caracas: Publicaciones Seleven C.A., Hyspamerica Ediciones. Traducción: Julia Pérez. Introducciones: Oscar Yanes y José Cuberos. Con ilustraciones, 226 pp., 1979.

=== About ecology ===
- EWEL, John J. y MADRIZ, Arnaldo. Zonas de vida de Venezuela. Memoria explicativa sobre el mapa ecológico. Caracas: M.A.C. (Ministerio de Agricultura y Cría), Dirección de Investigación, 1968.
- FUNDACIÓN DE EDUCACIÓN AMBIENTAL. Los Parques nacionales de Venezuela. Madrid: Incafo, 1983.
- GEORGE, Uwe. Inseln in der Zeit. Hamburg: Geo im Verlag, 1988.
- GONZÁLEZ, V. C. Los morichales de los Llanos orientales. Un enfoque ecológico. Caracas: Ediciones CORPOVEN, 1987.
- NATIONAL GEOGRAPHIC SOCIETY. Venezuela's islands in Time. Washington: N.G.S., 1989.
- VARESCHI, Volkmar. Ecología de la vegetación tropical. Caracas: Sociedad Venezolana de Ciencias Naturales, 1992. ISBN 980-07-1270-4.
- WEIBEZAHN, Franz H.; ÁLVAREZ, Haymara; LEWIS, William M., editores. El río Orinoco como ecosistema. Caracas: Electrificación del Caroni C.A. (EDELCA), Fondo Editorial Acta Científica Venezolana, C.A. Venezolana de Navegación (CAVN), Universidad Simón Bolívar. Impresos Rubel C.A., 1990.
