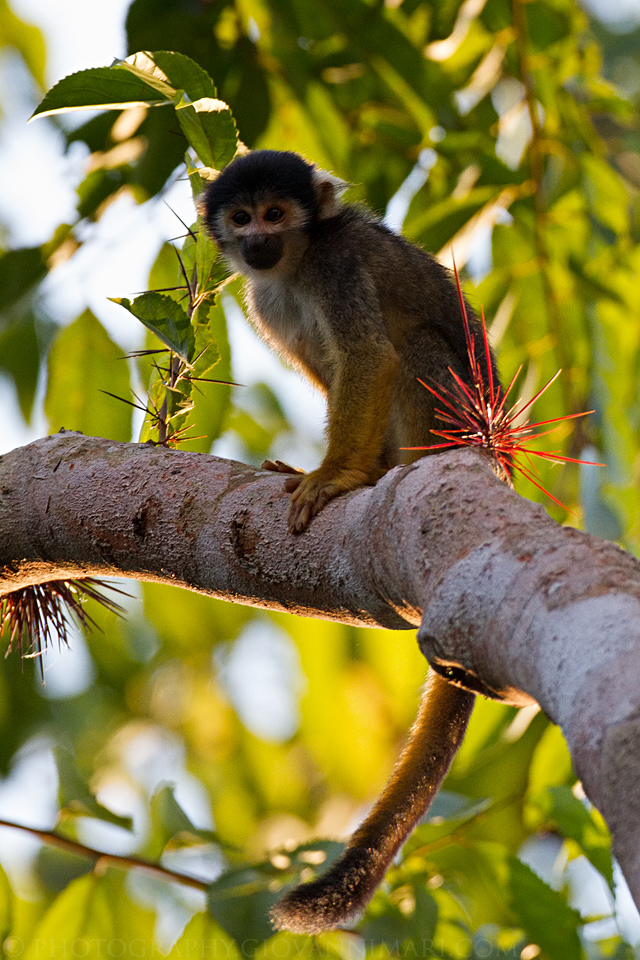

Conservation status
- Endangered (IUCN 3.1)

Scientific classification
- Kingdom: Animalia
- Phylum: Chordata
- Class: Mammalia
- Infraclass: Placentalia
- Order: Primates
- Family: Cebidae
- Genus: Saimiri
- Species: S. vanzolinii

Binomial name
- Saimiri vanzolinii Ayres, 1985
- Geographic range

= Black squirrel monkey =

Species of New World monkey

The black squirrel monkey (Saimiri vanzolinii), also known as the blackish squirrel monkey or black-headed squirrel monkey, is a small New World primate, endemic to the central Amazon in Brazil. It largely resembles the female of the far more common Bolivian squirrel monkey, though the latter lacks the black central back.

This squirrel monkey has one of the most restricted geographical distributions for a primate, living in várzea forest in the confluence of the Japura and Solimões rivers. Its entire range is within the Mamirauá Sustainable Development Reserve. It resides in the reserve with two other Saimiri species. It is a social primate that travels with other black squirrel monkeys in large troops within its habitat. Its small size makes it an easy target for its predators; however, it may resist predators when it travels in large troops.

Its species overall has positive effects on the economy.

== Description ==
Black squirrel monkeys are small primates. They have blackish-gray fur over most of their body except for their legs and stomach. Their legs can be yellow or have a reddish tint. Their stomachs will have a yellow tint. They have short and dense fur everywhere except for certain areas on the face. They lack hair in the areas of the nostrils and lips, and the skin is black in these areas. Black squirrel monkeys tend to be 27 to 32 centimeters in length not including the length of their tails. Their full length, including their tails, can be about 40 centimeters longer than their length without their tails. Male black squirrel monkeys range in weight anywhere from 0.64 to 1.22 kilograms (1.4 to 2.7 pounds). Female black squirrel monkeys have a weight range of 0.64 to 0.86 kg (1.4 to 1.9 lb).

=== Distinctive characteristics ===
They get their name from the strip of black that extends from their head to the end of their tail. The black fur above their eyes forms a shallow arch and is lower on their foreheads than other species. Their tails are specifically distinct from the Saimiri sciureus species because black squirrel monkeys have much thinner tails.

=== Lifespan ===
On average, black squirrel monkeys live up to 15 years in their natural habitat, the várzea forest. They can live about 5 to 10 years longer than that when they are kept in captivity.

== Taxonomy ==
The black squirrel monkey falls under the genus, Saimiri. There are four other species that fall under this same genus with the black squirrel monkey.

- Saimiri boliviensis
- Saimiri oerstedi
- Saimiri ustus
- Saimiri sciureus

UCLA scientists and colleagues concluded that black squirrel monkeys are a distinct species of Saimiri when it was originally considered the same species as Saimiri boliviensis.

== Habitat ==
Black squirrel monkeys reside within the Mamirauá Sustainable Development Reserve in Brazil. The várzea forest of this specific area experiences a consistent cycle of flooding. The patterns of rain can cause a typical buildup of around 35 feet of flooding in the forest. Atypical flooding due to excessive floods over a longer amount of time can threaten black squirrel monkeys' habitat.

=== Observations ===
Two species, Humboldt's squirrel monkey and Ecuadorian squirrel monkey, take residence in the reserve in cohabitation with black squirrel monkeys. The black squirrel monkeys inhabit a smaller ranged area than the other two species within the reserve. All three species interact with one another but sexual interaction and reproduction between two different species has not been observed.

=== Vulnerability ===
The black squirrel monkey species is declared endangered because of their limited range in the várzea forest. The change in climate due to global warming is also affecting the lives of the black squirrel monkey species.

== Behaviour ==
They are interactive primates. They exist in large groups of 40–50, and can exist in groups as large as 500 monkeys. Travelling in big groups allows these monkeys to resist their predators more effectively. They have more eyes on their surroundings which allows them to more easily and quickly alert the pack if they sense danger. If the pack is big enough, the pack may be able to surround certain predators.

=== Communication ===
Black squirrel monkeys are typically quiet primates. The only times they make noise are when they sense danger or are trying to call out to other members of their group.

=== Reproduction ===
Breeding season falls between the months of September and November. During this season, the male monkeys with fattened stomachs are desired more by the female monkeys. A female monkey's pregnancy will last about 140 to 170 days, and the time of birth falls at the same time that rainfall and food availability are at their peaks.

== Ecological role ==
The black squirrel monkey is preyed upon by snakes in trees, raptors, and jaguars.

This black squirrel monkeys is omnivorous. It prefers fruit and insects, but also eats leaves, flowers, seeds, eggs, and small vertebrates.

== Economic importance ==
Black squirrel monkeys have a positive effect on the economy by serving as subjects of biomedical research, being sold to serve as an individual's pet, and serving as a source of food. There are no negative impacts of the species on the economy because of the species' small habitation range that they occupy.

== Gallery ==
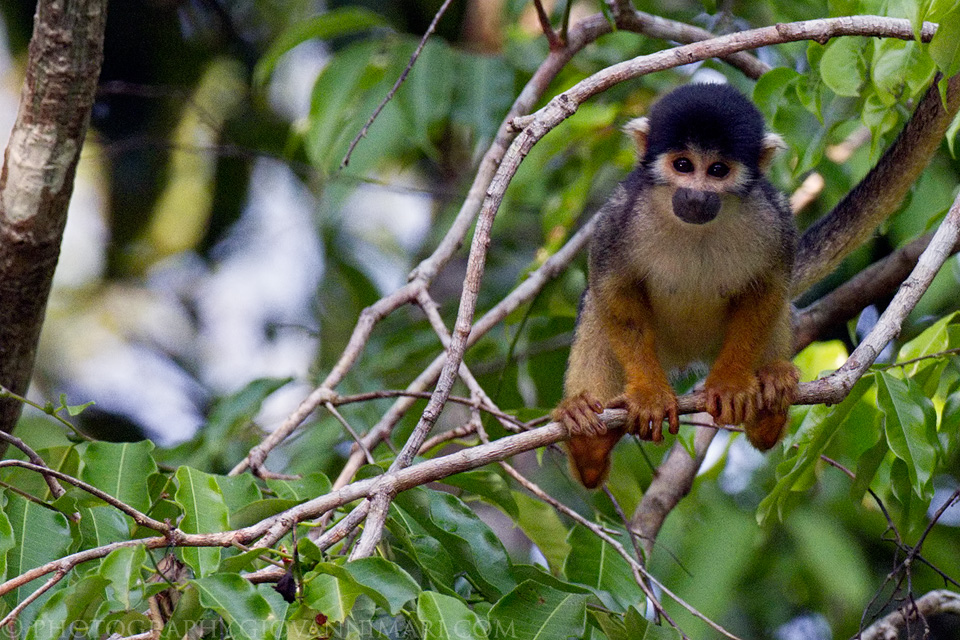

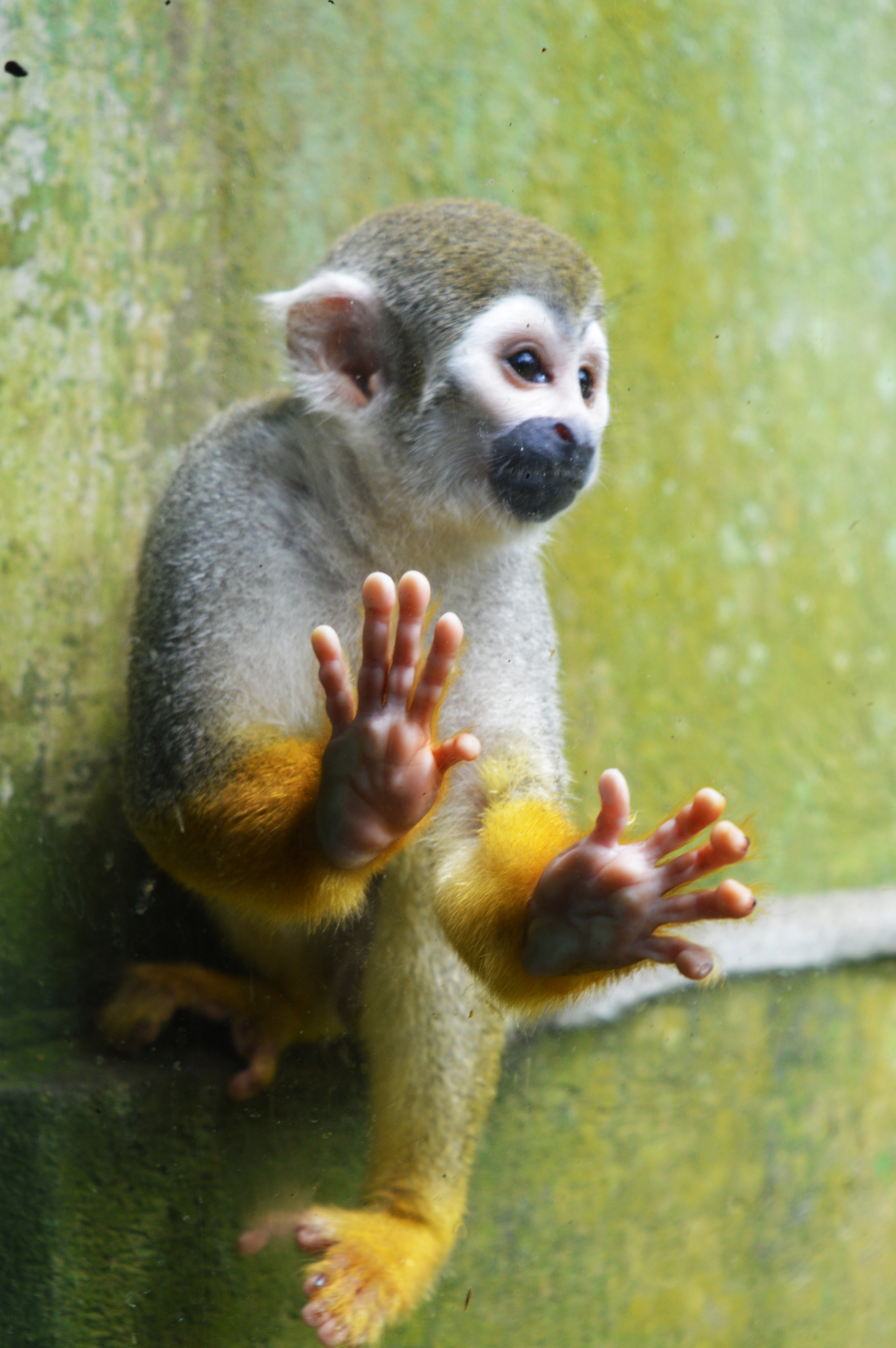

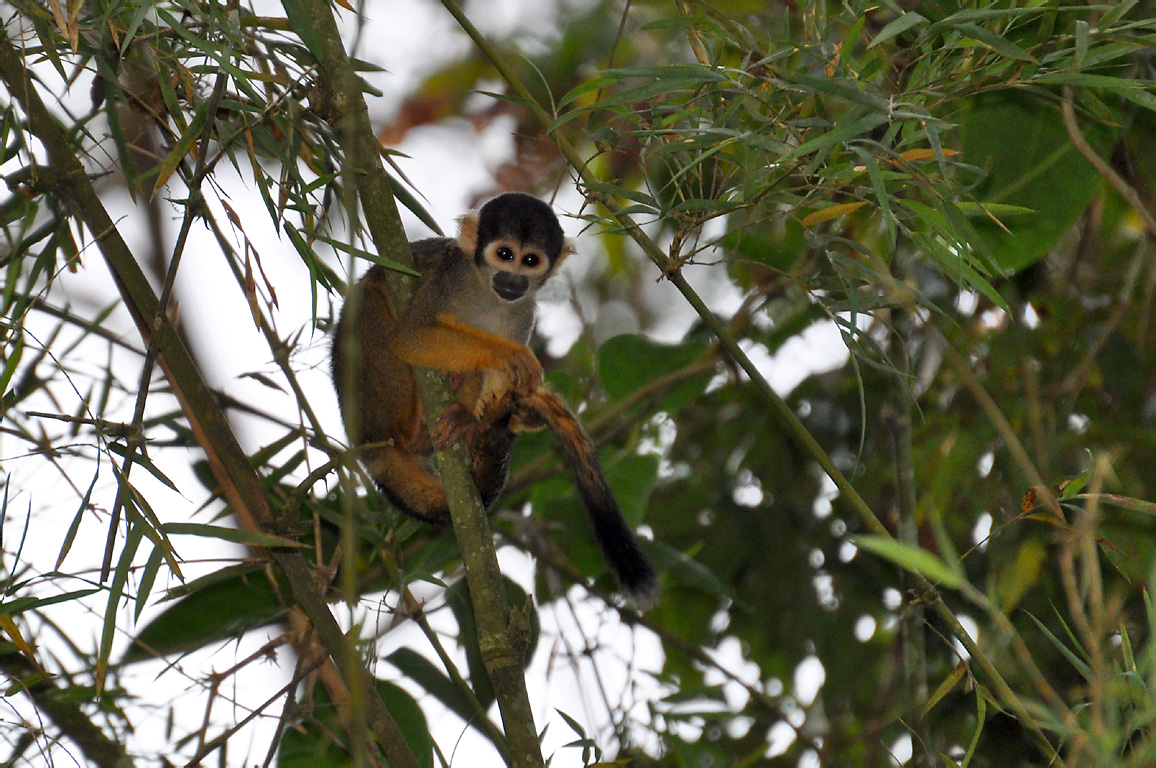

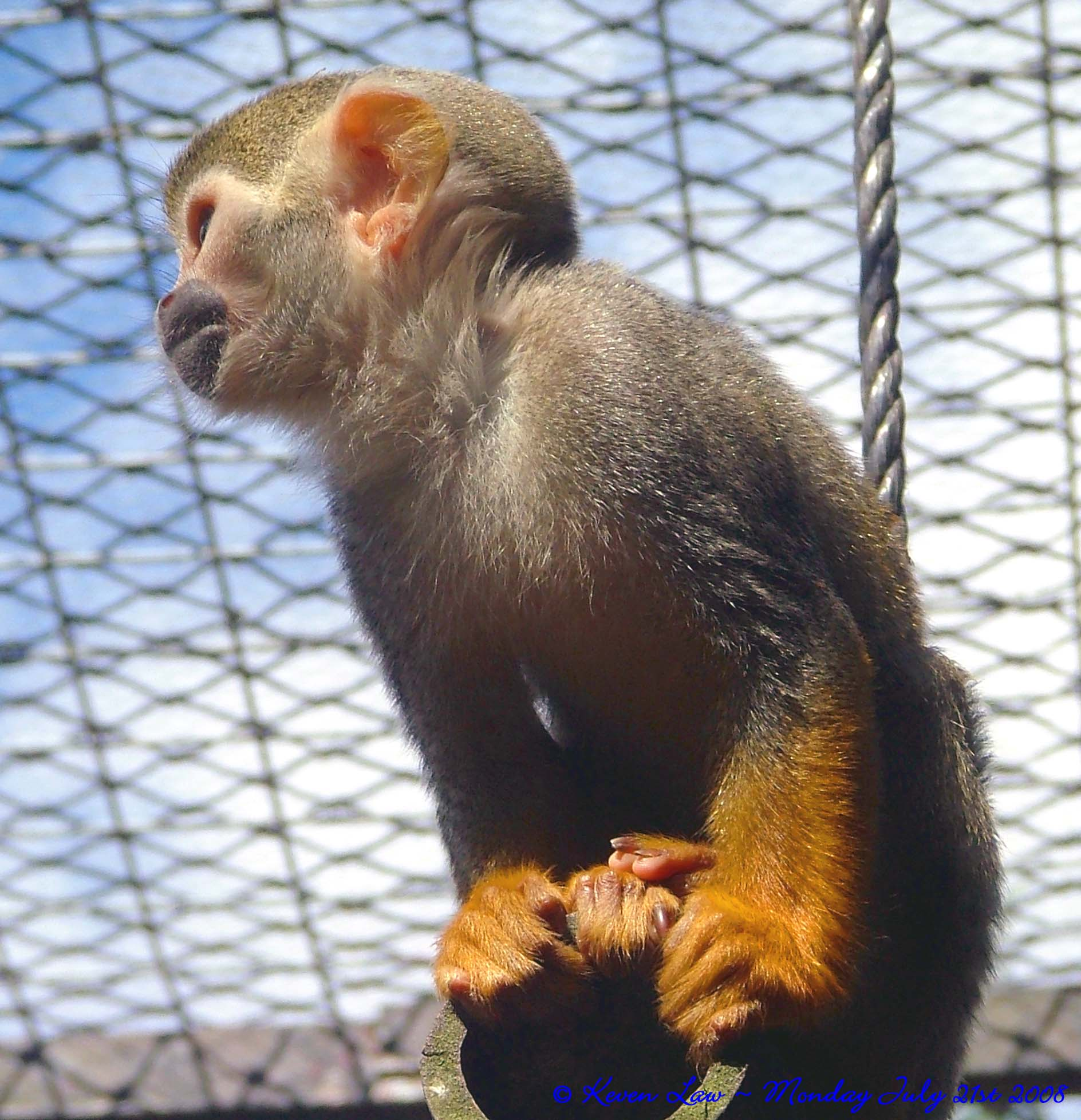

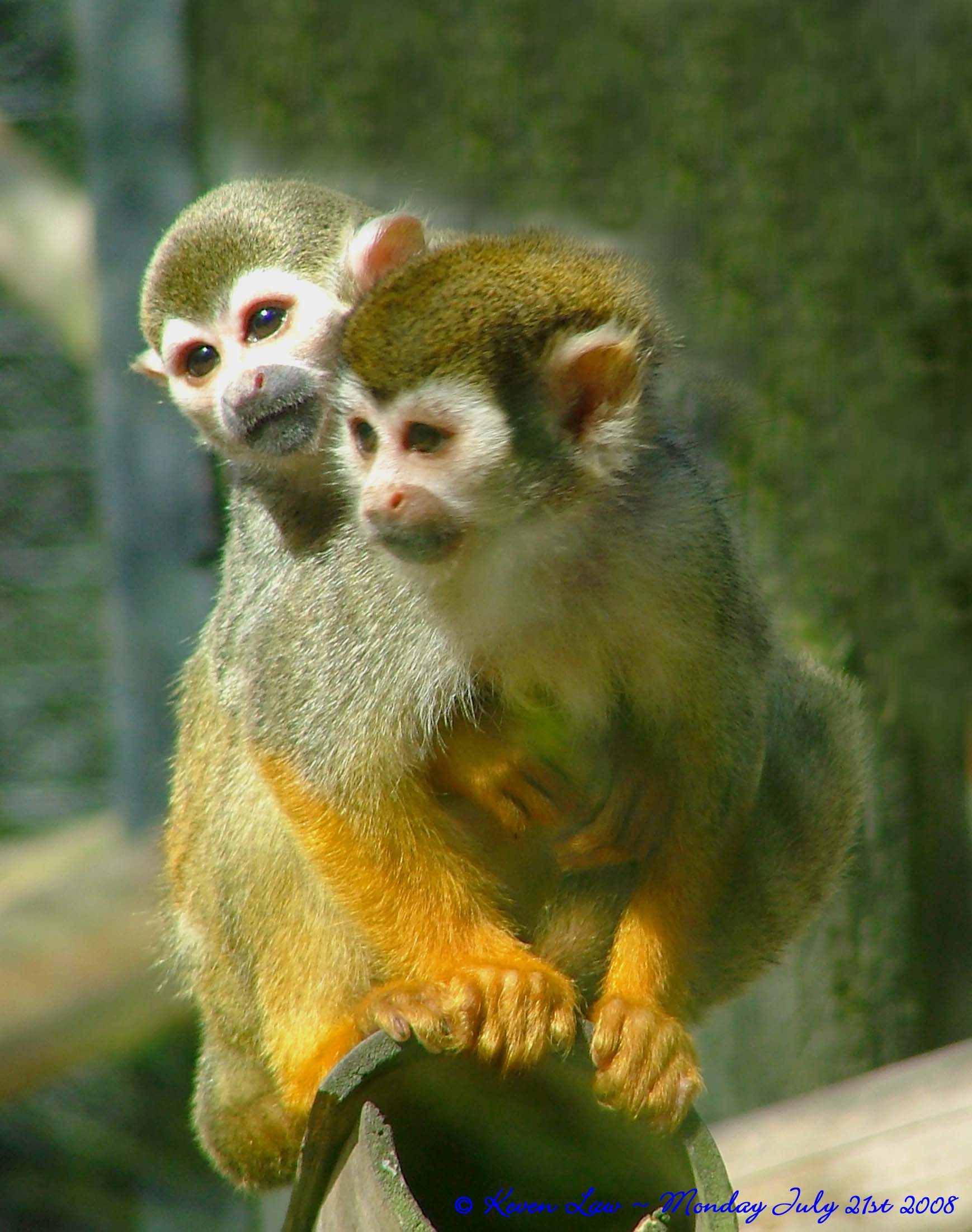
