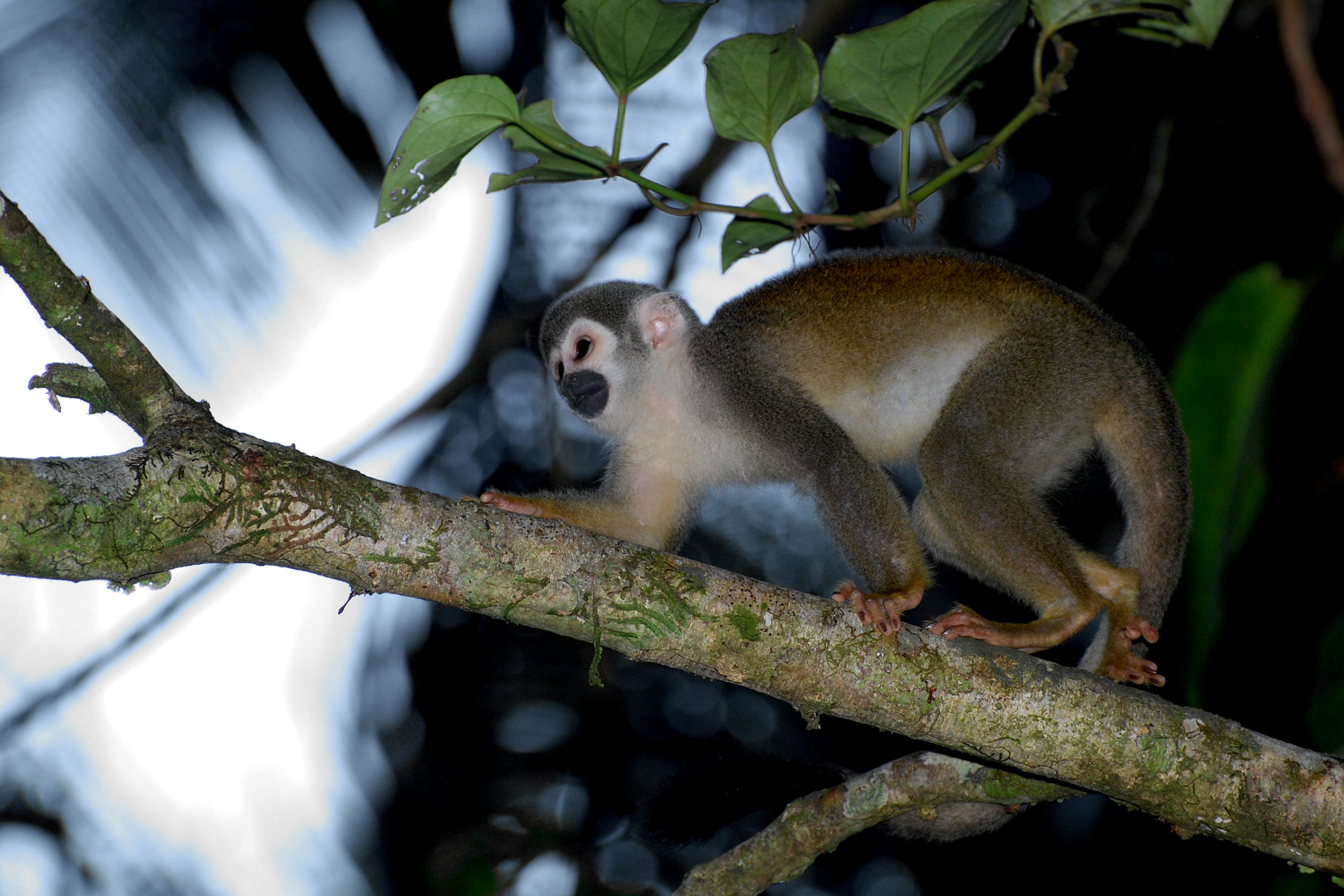

Scientific classification
- Kingdom: Animalia
- Phylum: Chordata
- Class: Mammalia
- Order: Primates
- Family: Cebidae
- Subfamily: Saimiriinae
- Genus: Saimiri

Groups included
- Saimiri sciureus; Saimiri cassiquiarensis; Saimiri collinsi
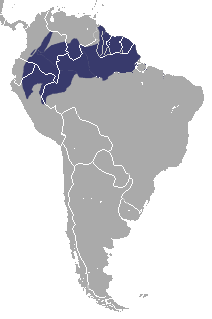
- Geographic range

Cladistically included but traditionally excluded taxa
- Saimiri oerstedii; Saimiri ustus; Saimiri boliviensis; Saimiri vanzolinii

= Common squirrel monkey =

Common name for multiple mammal species

Common squirrel monkey is the traditional common name for several small squirrel monkey species native to the tropical areas of South America. The term common squirrel monkey had been used as the common name for Saimiri sciureus before genetic research by Jessica Lynch Alfaro and others indicated S. scuireus covered at least three and possibly four species: the Guianan squirrel monkey (S. scuireus), Humboldt's squirrel monkey (S. cassiquiarensis) and Collins' squirrel monkey (S. collinsi). The Ecuadorian squirrel monkey (S. cassiquiarensis macrodon), generally regarded as a subspecies of Humboldt's squirrel monkey, had also been sometimes proposed as a separate species that had originally been included within the term "common squirrel monkey."

== Range and introductions ==
Common squirrel monkeys are found primarily in the Amazon Basin. Before the taxon was split, it had been considered to be found within the countries of Brazil, Colombia, Ecuador, French Guiana, Guyana, Peru, Suriname and Venezuela; a small population has been introduced to Florida and many of the Caribbean Islands. However, taxonomic research in 2009 and 2015 determined that several populations that had been considered S. scuireus were actually separate species:

- Guianan squirrel monkey, S. sciureus
- Collins' squirrel monkey, S. collinsi
- Humboldt's squirrel monkey, S. cassiquiarensis

The Ecuadorian squirrel monkey, S. cassiquiarensis macrodon, has also sometimes been regarded as a separate species.

As a result of these populations no longer being considered S. scuireus, the range of S. scuireus is now limited to Brazil and the Guianas.

A group of free-ranging individuals was spotted and photographed in 2009 at the Tijuca Forest in Rio de Janeiro – possibly the result of an illegal release or of an escape from the pet trade; by 2010, the squirrel monkey had begun to be considered as an invasive species in the Brazilian Atlantic rainforest, and concerns were expressed about its role as a predator of eggs of endangered bird species. The common squirrel monkey prefers to live in the middle canopy, but occasionally comes to the ground or goes up into the high canopy. They like vegetation which provides good cover from birds of prey in the rainforest, savannah, mangroves, or marshlands.

At least five populations of common squirrel monkeys have existed in Florida since the 1960s, if not earlier. Common squirrel monkeys have been established at Silver Springs since at least the late 1960s; rhesus macaques were established in the area by 1938, but there is no firm information on when the squirrel monkeys were released. In the 1960s, a colony of twelve to fifteen common squirrel monkeys was noted residing in a hammock of trees by the springs; they migrated downstream to the Ocklawaha River by 1975. Another population, derived from two pairs released in the 1960s, lives on the Bartlett Estate in Broward County; they numbered 43 in 1988. In 1976, 15 squirrel monkeys escaped from the Tropic Wonderland attraction in Titusville, Florida; their descendants have since become established in the area. In the 1980s, 500 and 1000 common squirrel monkeys remained in the shuttered Masterpiece Gardens park in Polk County, persisting despite efforts to capture them. Additionally, a "semi-free-ranging" population has existed at Monkey Jungle in Goulds in Miami-Dade County since 1960.

== Biology and behavior ==
=== Diet ===
Common squirrel monkeys are considered both frugivorous and insectivorous, preferring berry-like fruit on branches. When in captivity, squirrel monkeys are fed fruits such as apples, oranges, grapes, and bananas. They also consume a variety of vegetables that include lettuce, celery, and onions. Squirrel monkeys also look for insects and small vertebrates, such as tree frogs. It obtains a majority of its water from the foods eaten, and also obtains water from holes in trees and puddles on the ground. When fruit is scarce, the common squirrel monkey drinks nectar.

The amount of time squirrel monkeys spend foraging depends on the type of food. When bigger fruits and easy access occur, they do not spend much time foraging. Otherwise, they dedicate a considerable amount of time to looking for their foods. Foraging also keeps the monkeys entertained and active. Oftentimes when they are captive, they easily become bored as the food is more easily obtained.

=== Social behavior ===
Common squirrel monkeys are polygamous with a multiple-male, multiple-female group structure. Most social interactions in S. sciureus groups occur within the various age/sex classes, with the division of classes being between adult male categories, mother-infant categories, and juvenile categories. The core of the group is made up of the adult females and their young. As a result of the natural attraction each class has to the adult females, the different age/sex classes come together as one social group. Though juveniles play and jump around an appreciable amount during phases of high activity, they usually stay close to the adult females. In terms of the males' level of attraction to the adult females, the phase of the yearly reproductive cycle determines their distance from the adult females. Overall, interactions between the various age/sex classes are most frequently directed to adult females. The division of age/sex classes among S. sciureus is not so strictly defined because the degree of segregation between gender can vary. That is, those subspecies which have a high degree of sexual dimorphism are sexually segregated, such that the males and females of that subspecies interact less with each other than do those of subspecies that are not very sexually dimorphic and thus sexually integrated.

Seasonal reproduction plays a major role in the social behavior of common squirrel monkeys, where the frequency of between-sex interactions of the males and females differs between the birth season and the mating season. Adult males are generally socially inactive during the birth season and spend their time travelling and foraging at a distance from the group. During the mating season, though, the adult males become fatter, excited, aggressive, and highly vocal and spend most of their time engaging in dominance interactions among themselves or following and approaching the adult females in estrus, in hopes of being able to mate with them. Males can increase their chances at copulating with receptive females by approaching them quietly. Nonreceptive females, though, respond aggressively to any male approach and threaten and chase the males away, usually with the help of surrounding females. Overall, intersexual interaction among common squirrel monkeys greatly increases during the mating season.

Common squirrel monkey infants develop rapidly. They become fairly independent between five and eight months of age and spend only a small percentage of the day with their mothers. Also at this age range, the infants can find food on their own. Infants are active members of the social group, climbing, running, exploring, and frequently making contact with adult members of the group. Most adult-infant interactions are initiated by infants towards adult females that are not their mothers. Adults generally respond to the infants calmly, but some adults may respond with antagonism. Infants rank the lowest in the group.

Many other aspects of common squirrel monkey social behavior, such as dominance relationships, coalitions, dispersal patterns, and aggression, stem from the feeding ecology of the animals. Feeding ecology directly affects the females of the group which in turn affects the behavior of the males in the group. The feeding patches for common squirrel monkeys are very small and dense, which makes it possible for an individual with the greatest capability of winning a fight, if one were to occur, to monopolize access to any patch. Within-group competition among common squirrel monkey groups is extremely high, and between-group competition is moderate to high. Coalition formation is not as stable as would be expected among the females of the group because considering their small and dense feeding patches, common squirrel monkey females with the greatest capability of winning a fight would benefit more if they were to form alliances to gain control of a patch and then not share the patch once in control of it.

Once sexually mature, all males emigrate from their natal groups. After leaving, they may either become solitary, a peripheral of another troop, join another mixed-sex troop, or attend a tolerant troop of another monkey species. If they become a peripheral of another group, the male squirrel monkey chooses one troop and keeps a certain distance away from them while still trying to follow them. These males are the less dominant ones. A few male squirrel monkeys have been observed interacting with groups of other monkey species. Some females may leave their natal groups, as well, although they tend to be more philopatric. If females do leave their natal groups, they do it after becoming sexually mature. Often, they migrate before or right after a mating season. Due to this, they might end up leaving their group when they are pregnant or with their immature offspring.

Males are typically dominant to females, but females still have a high status in the group. and are capable of forming coalitions against dominant males. Rarely do males form coalitions even if a group of males keeps their distance from the main group or are solitary. Several theories suggest that one of the reasons that male squirrel monkeys do not form coalitions is because of the lack of kinship due to emigration. Coalitions may also increase mortality risks within the group since males tend to be aggressive to each other.

Genital display among males is an important social signal in relation to group hierarchy; it is derived from sexual behavior, but is used for social communication. It involves the animal spreading his thighs and having an erect penis. Dominant males display to submissive males to emphasize their higher status. The dominant males direct their action to the face of the passive males, and the act can be done with the displayer leaning over the passive monkey or the displayer doing the action from a distance in a more upright position. This form of dominance interaction, as well as several types of aggression, increase during the mating season when males want to emphasize their rank and strength and gain more control over other males in relation to access to females. Genital displays may also define male-male alliances when the males participate in "joint genital displays".

=== Habits ===
Common squirrel monkeys are diurnal. They are usually quiet, but will utter loud cries when alarmed. They use different types of calls for specific situations. Some of their common call types include caws, bawls, and shrieks. Squirrel monkeys utter caws mostly when they are trying to defend a territory. They may use bawls prior to a fight, as well as after one. Shrieks are mainly heard when the monkeys are fighting for dominance. Squirrel monkeys' most common calls are determined by their genetics. Squirrel monkeys that have been isolated since infancy are able to produce the same calls as those that have been exposed to the calls. Few variations exist between the frequencies of the calls of infants that were raised differently. A squirrel monkey that was deaf since birth was also able to produce the same calls, proving that the calls come from their genes. It is arboreal, but sometimes it comes down to the ground. Bands or troops can number from 12-100. Occasionally, troops as large as 500 have been seen in undisturbed forests.

== Conservation status ==
Prior to the taxon being splits, common squirrel monkeys were rated as "least concern" by IUCN, but subject to being harmed by deforestation. They have also been captured extensively for the pet trade and for medical research.

== As pets ==
Due to their inquisitive and playful nature, these common squirrel monkeys are popular pets. They require a large amount of space and food.

== Gallery ==
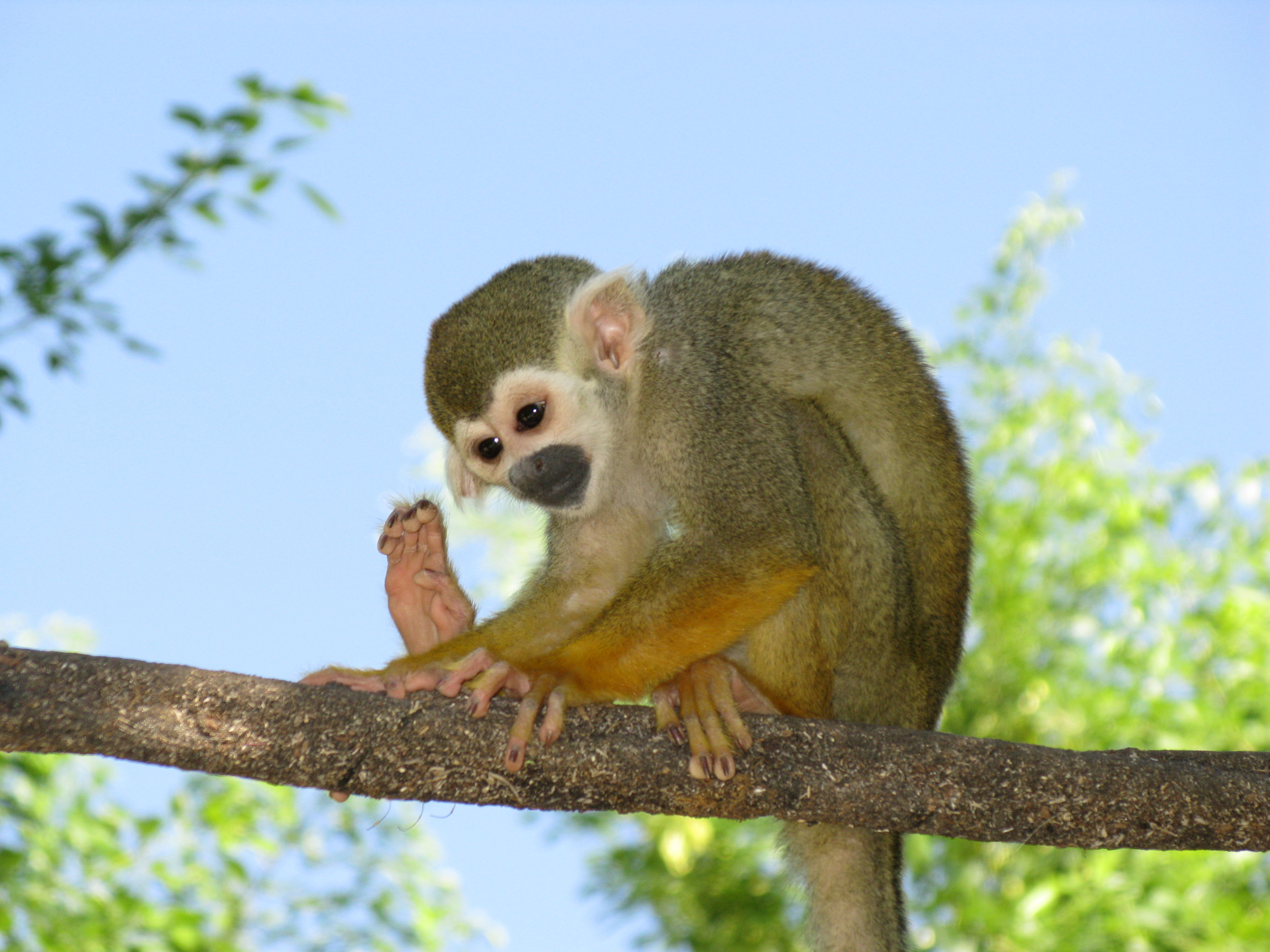
At the Phoenix Zoo

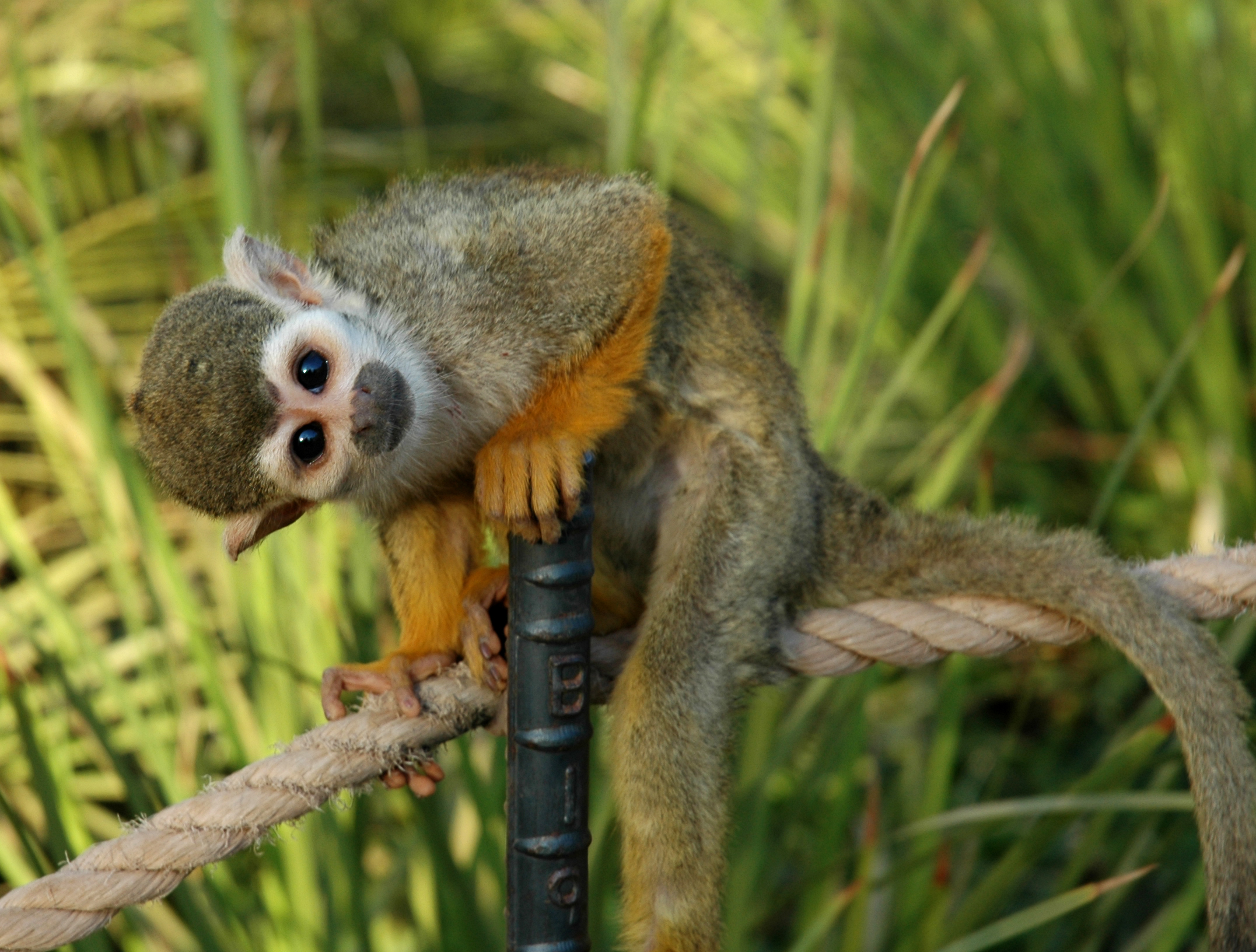
At the Phoenix Zoo

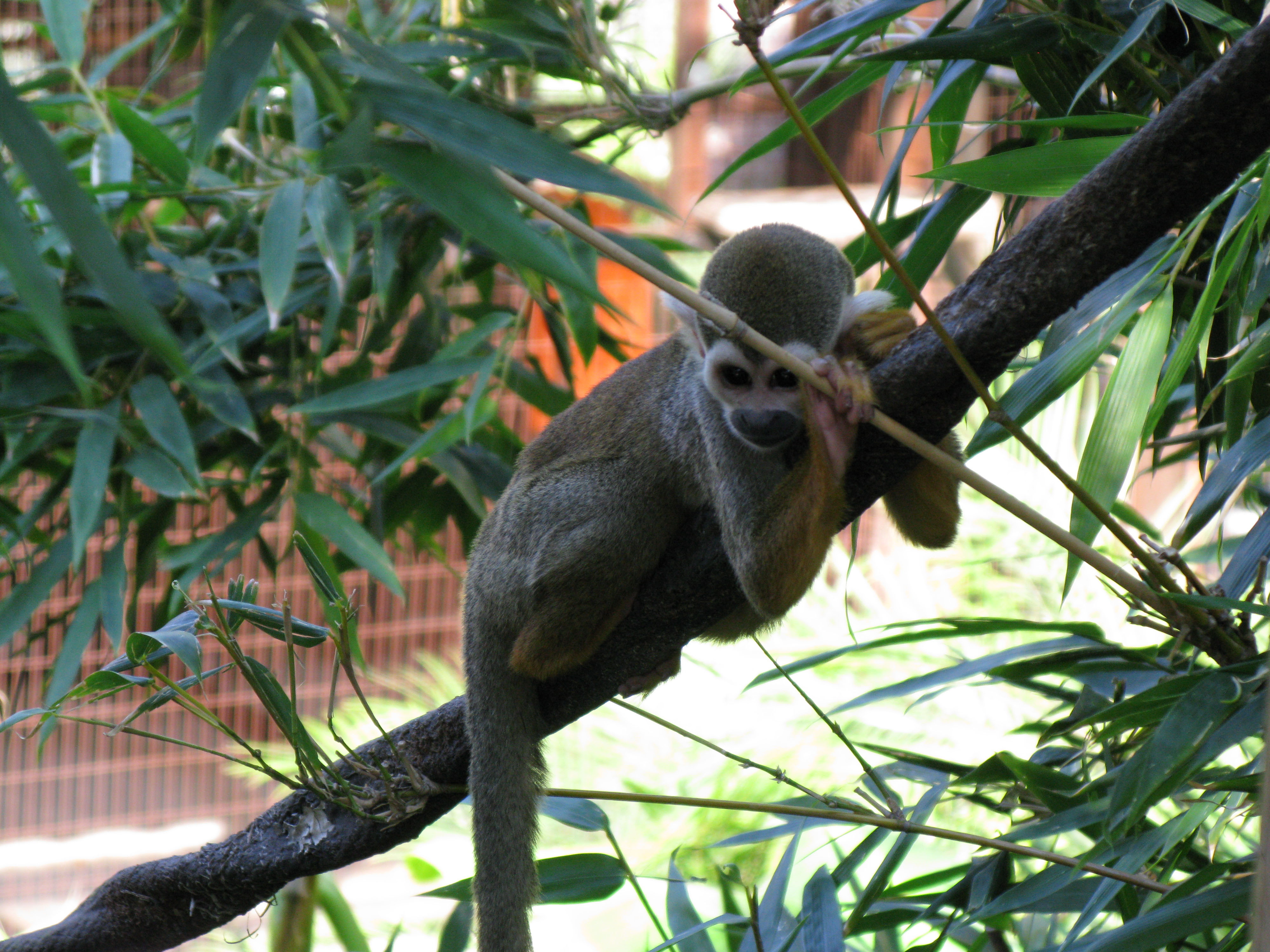
At the Phoenix Zoo

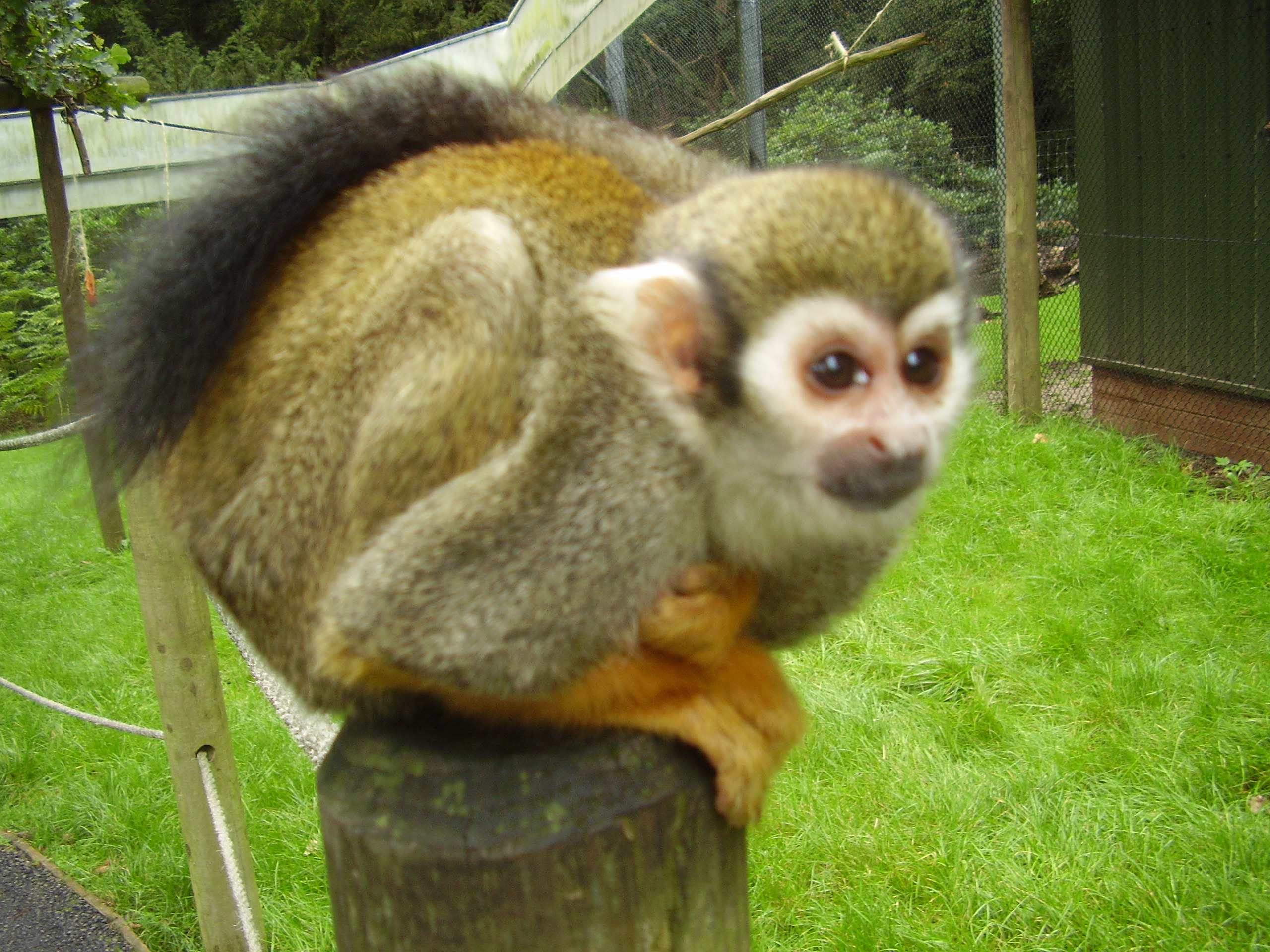
In the walkthrough area of the Woburn Safari Park

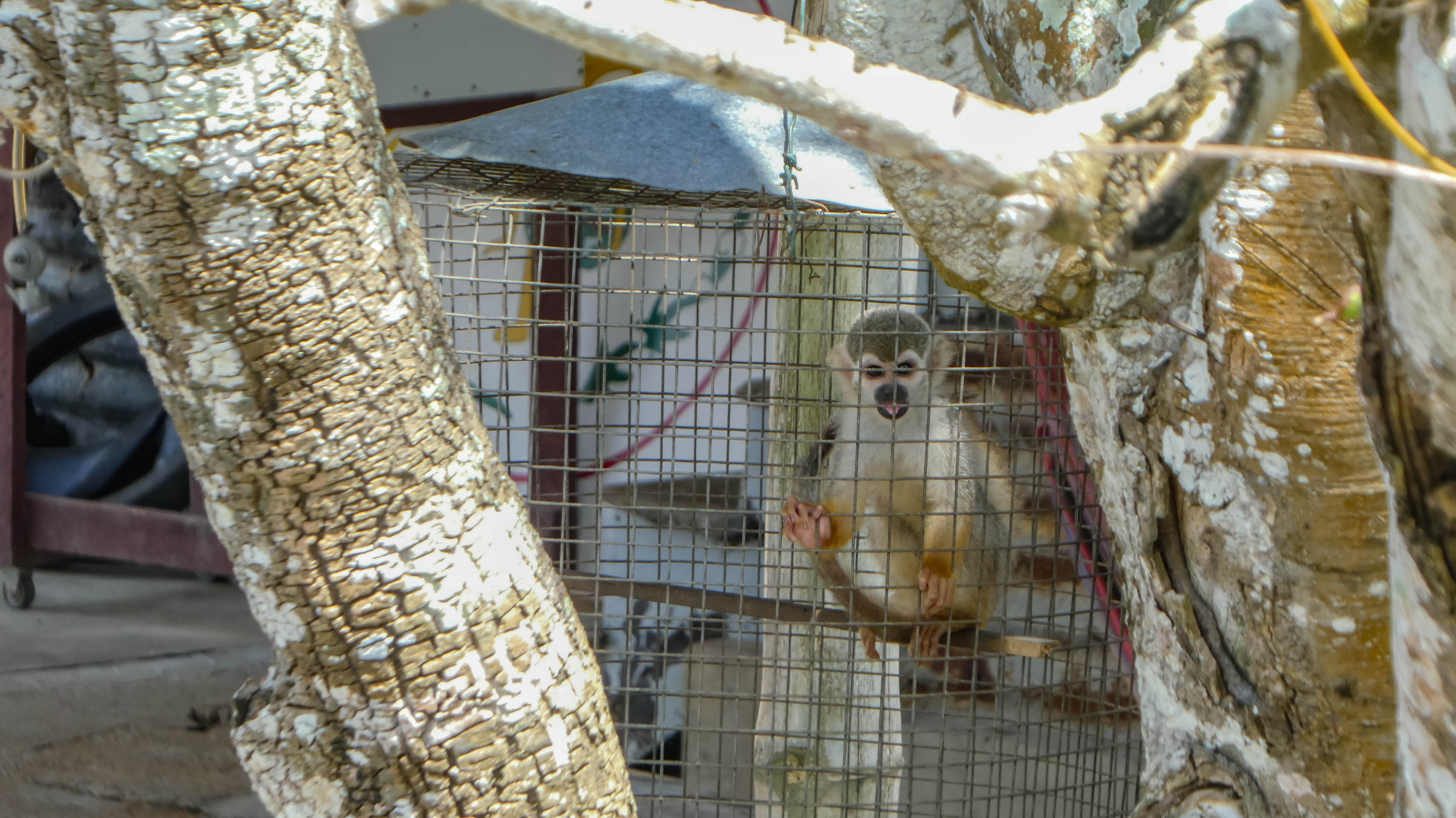
A pet squirrel monkey in a cage at a house in the former plantation Rust en Werk

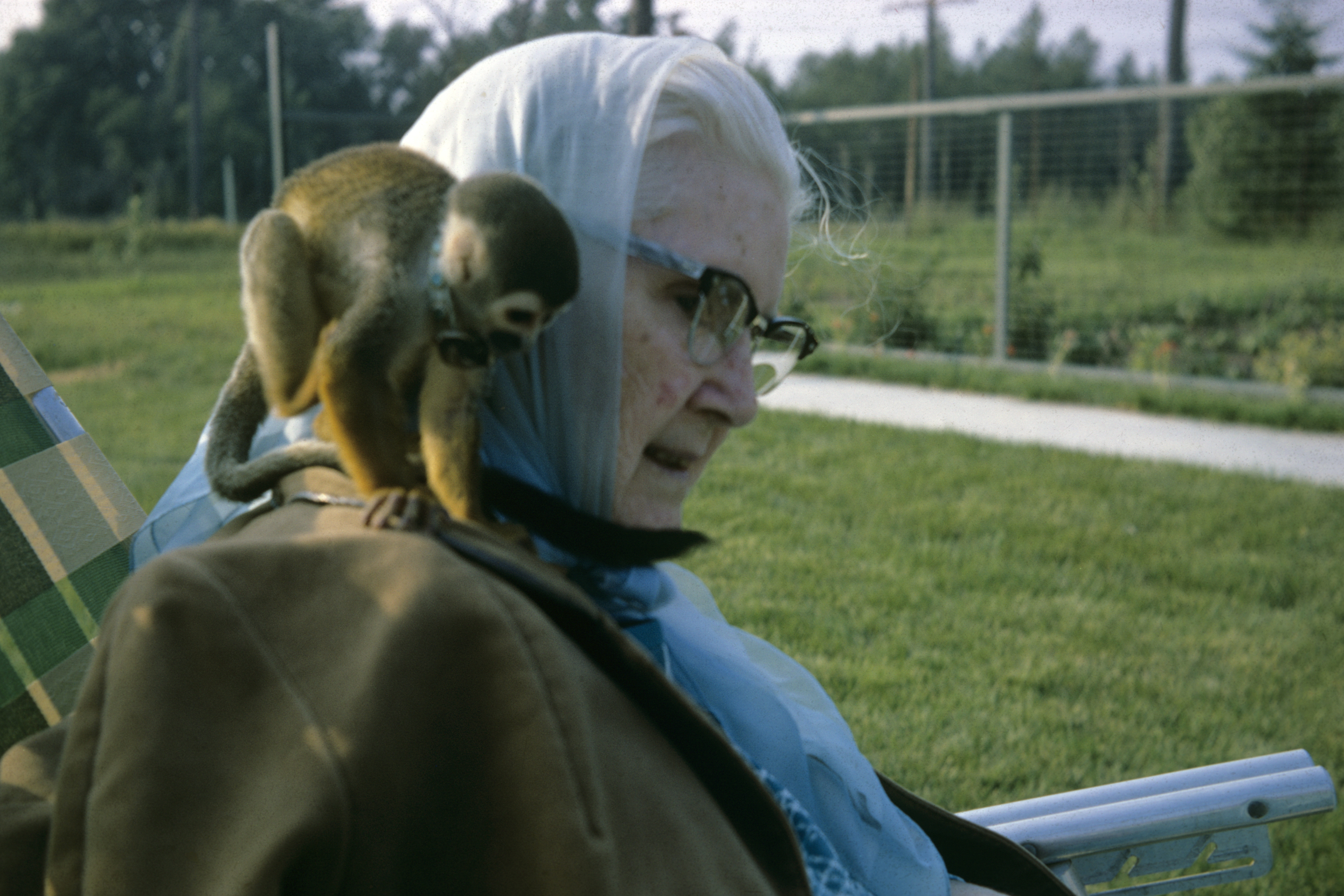
Pet squirrel monkey on lady's shoulder
