= Kids Saving the Rainforest =

Environmental organization based in Cista Roca

Kids Saving the Rainforest (KTSR)
- Abbreviation: KSTR
- Formation: February 1999; 27 years ago
- Founders: Janine Licare; Aislin Livingstone; Jennifer Rice
- Type: NGO
- Purpose: Environmentalism; Conservation; Ecology
- Headquarters: Manuel Antonio, Costa Rica; Palo Alto, California
- Region served: Costa Rica, Peru, California
- Methods: animal rescue; animal rehabilitation; reforestation
- President: Jennifer Rice, PHD
- Chairman of the Board, Regent: Pia Martin, DVM
- Website: kidssavingtherainforest.org

Kids Saving the Rainforest (KSTR) is a Costa Rica–based non-governmental non-profit 501(c)(3) organization founded in 1999 to plant trees in depleted areas of the country, and to rescue, rehabilitate and, when possible, release the animals who live in these forests. Since its inception, Kids Saving the Rainforest has planted or is in the process of planting nearly 100,000 trees and rescued and rehabilitated 3,000 wild animals, two-thirds of which have been released back into the wild.

KSTR's mission is: "to protect the diverse wildlife of Costa Rica’s Pacific Coast by rehabilitating wildlife, conducting original scientific research, training volunteers, and promoting conservation."

== History ==
Kids Saving the Rainforest was founded in February 1999 by two nine-year old girls, Janine Licare and Aislin Livingstone, who were living in the jungle of Manuel Antonio, Costa Rica. The girls made paper-mache bottles and painted rocks and sold them by the side of the road to raise money for saplings that would be planted in the nearby forest.

Since then, KSTR has become a fully functional environmental organization with a board of directors. Licare's mother, Jennifer Rice is president. The staff includes a number of full-time people plus volunteers.

KSTR is located outside Manual Antonio, Costa Rica, but has projects in 18 countries.

== Programs ==
=== Rescue, rehabilitate and release ===
KSTR rescues and rehabs animals that are brought to their facility. In addition, the ones that can not be released back into the wild are given sanctuary for life on the property. The goal is to release as many animals as possible. With an average of 200 rescues a year, over 75 species have been rescued at their center. This includes, among others, two- and three-toed sloths, squirrel monkeys, kinkajous, coatis, marmosets, tamarins, orange-chinned parakeets.

=== Wildlife bridges ===
KSTR started a Wildlife Bridge Program in 2000, originally to protect the endangered titi monkeys (squirrel monkey). They have since put up 130 bridges and 14 different animal species have been using them. Meanwhile, the titi monkey population has doubled. Whenever an arboreal animal is electrocuted by live wires, hit by a car, or attacked by dogs, KSTR reviews the necessity of a bridge and places it for them to cross high off the ground.

=== Reforestation ===
Since its inception, KSTR has planted over 7,000 trees, is in the process of planting another 80,000 on donated property elsewhere in Costa Rica, and reforests in other countries as well.

=== Volunteers ===
In order to run its facility and care for the animals, KSTR relies on volunteers who come in from around the world to help with all aspects of its programs. The volunteers clean, repair, and build cages, work on trails, prepare food for the animals, observe behavior, and more. Many volunteers are housed where they work at KSTR, but some opt for a day of volunteer work offered by area tour companies.

=== Education ===
A key element of KSTR is education about biodiversity conservation. Visitors who take the tours of the facility are given an educational talk about the rainforest and its inhabitants.

== Funding ==
KSTR operates entirely on donations.
