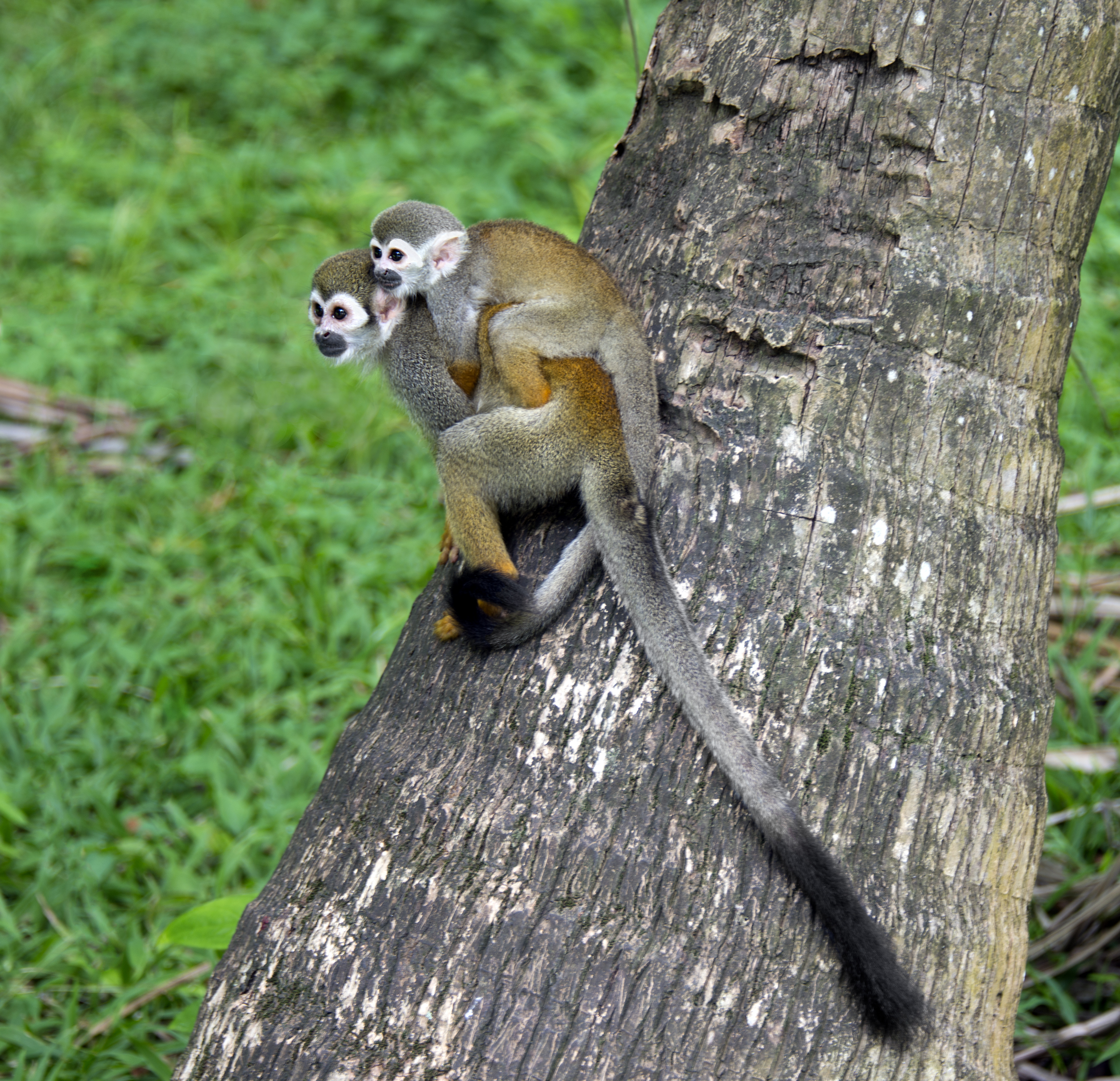

Conservation status
- Least Concern (IUCN 3.1)

Scientific classification
- Kingdom: Animalia
- Phylum: Chordata
- Class: Mammalia
- Infraclass: Placentalia
- Order: Primates
- Family: Cebidae
- Genus: Saimiri
- Species: S. sciureus

Binomial name
- Saimiri sciureus (Linnaeus, 1758)
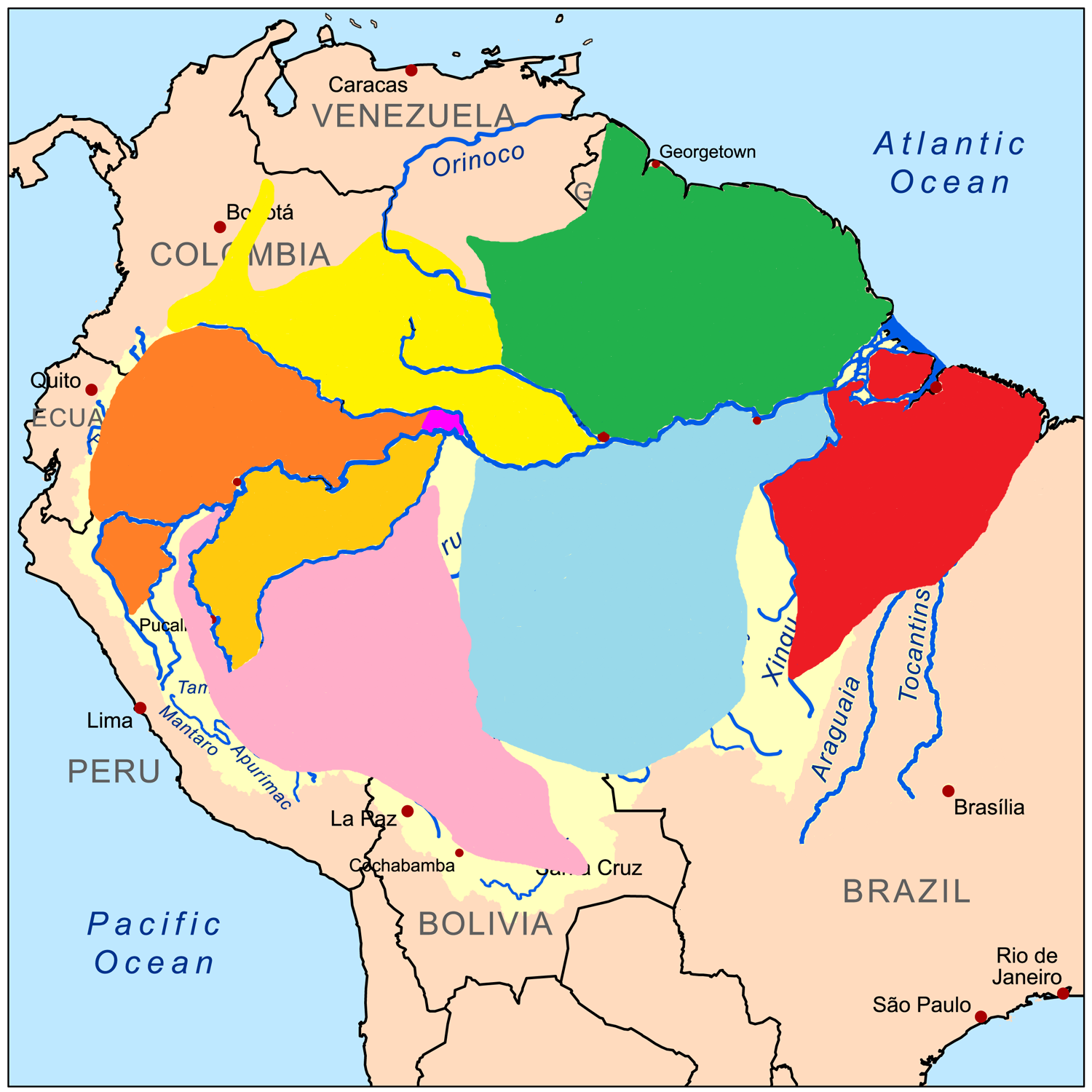
- Guianan squirrel monkey range shown in green

Synonyms
- Simia sciurea Linnaeus, 1758

= Guianan squirrel monkey =

Species of New World monkey

The Guianan squirrel monkey (Saimiri sciureus) is a species of squirrel monkey from Guiana, Venezuela and Brazil. S. sciureus formerly applied to Humboldt's squirrel monkey and Collins' squirrel monkey, but genetic research in 2009 and 2015 revealed that these are distinct species.

== Taxonomy ==
Several now-separate squirrel monkey species were formerly considered a single species, Saimiri sciureus, generally known as the common squirrel monkey, with a wide range in the northern half of South America. A 2009 genetic study by Carretero-Pinzón, et al indicated Humboldt's squirrel monkey, S. cassiquiarensis, from Colombia, Peru and Ecuador, which had been considered a subspecies of S. sciureus, was actually more closely related to other squirrel monkey species. A 2015 genetic study by Lynch Alfaro, et al revealed that Collins' squirrel monkey, S. collinsi, from northeastern Brazil, which had also been considered a subspecies of S. sciureus, should also be treated as a separate species. This left S. sciureus to apply to the squirrel monkeys in northern Brazil and the Guianas. Lynch Alfaro's study also revealed that despite the gap in their ranges, the squirrel monkey species most closely related to the Guianan squirrel monkey is the Central American squirrel monkey of Costa Rica and Panama.

== Description ==
Guianan squirrel monkey males have a body between 25 and 37 centimetres (9.8 and 14.6 in) long with a tail between 36 and 40 centimetres (14 and 16 in) long. Females have a body between 25 and 34 centimetres (9.8 and 13.4 in) long with a tail between 36 and 47 centimetres (14 and 19 in) long. Males weigh between 550 and 1,400 grams (19 and 49 oz) and females weigh between 550 and 1,200 grams (19 and 42 oz). The Guianan squirrel monkey has a pink face, black muzzle and white arches over the eyes. The crown of its head is olive or olive gray. The fur on its back can vary in color among gray, olive or orange, but the belly is white and the arms are yellow-orange.

== Behavior ==
The Guianan squirrel monkey often feeds and moves in mixed species groups with capuchin monkeys. It also associates with the red-backed bearded saki. Hybrids with the bare-eared squirrel monkey are known to occur along the boundaries of their ranges. The Guianan squirrel monkey's diet includes insects, seeds, fruit, young leaves, flowers, gum, shoots, nectar, spiders, lizards and bird eggs. On at least one occasion one was seen eating a bat, although it does not appear to hunt bats as often as the related Central American squirrel monkey.

Breeding is typically synchronized within each group. Males gain weight in the upper portion of their bodies and become more aggressive prior to mating season. Females do not appear to initiate mating. Gestation period is about 5 months, and all infants within a group are typically born within one week of each other during January or February. Males provide no parental care, but non-maternal females provide some alloparental care. Infants have slightly prehensile tails and are weaned at about 6 months. Females are sexually mature at about 2 1/2 years, and males are fully mature at 4 or 5 years. Guianan squirrel monkeys can live more than 20 years.
