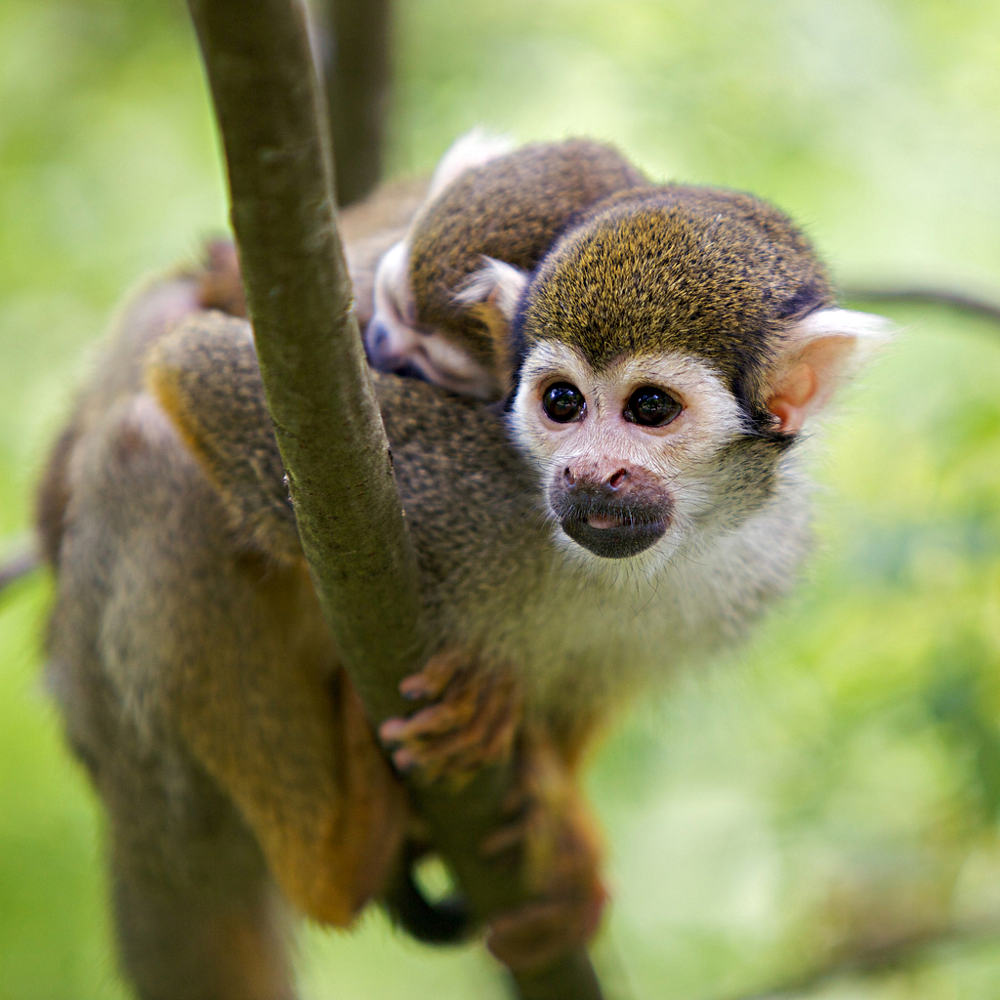

Conservation status
- Least Concern (IUCN 3.1)

Scientific classification
- Kingdom: Animalia
- Phylum: Chordata
- Class: Mammalia
- Infraclass: Placentalia
- Order: Primates
- Family: Cebidae
- Genus: Saimiri
- Species: S. collinsi

Binomial name
- Saimiri collinsi (Osgood, 1916)
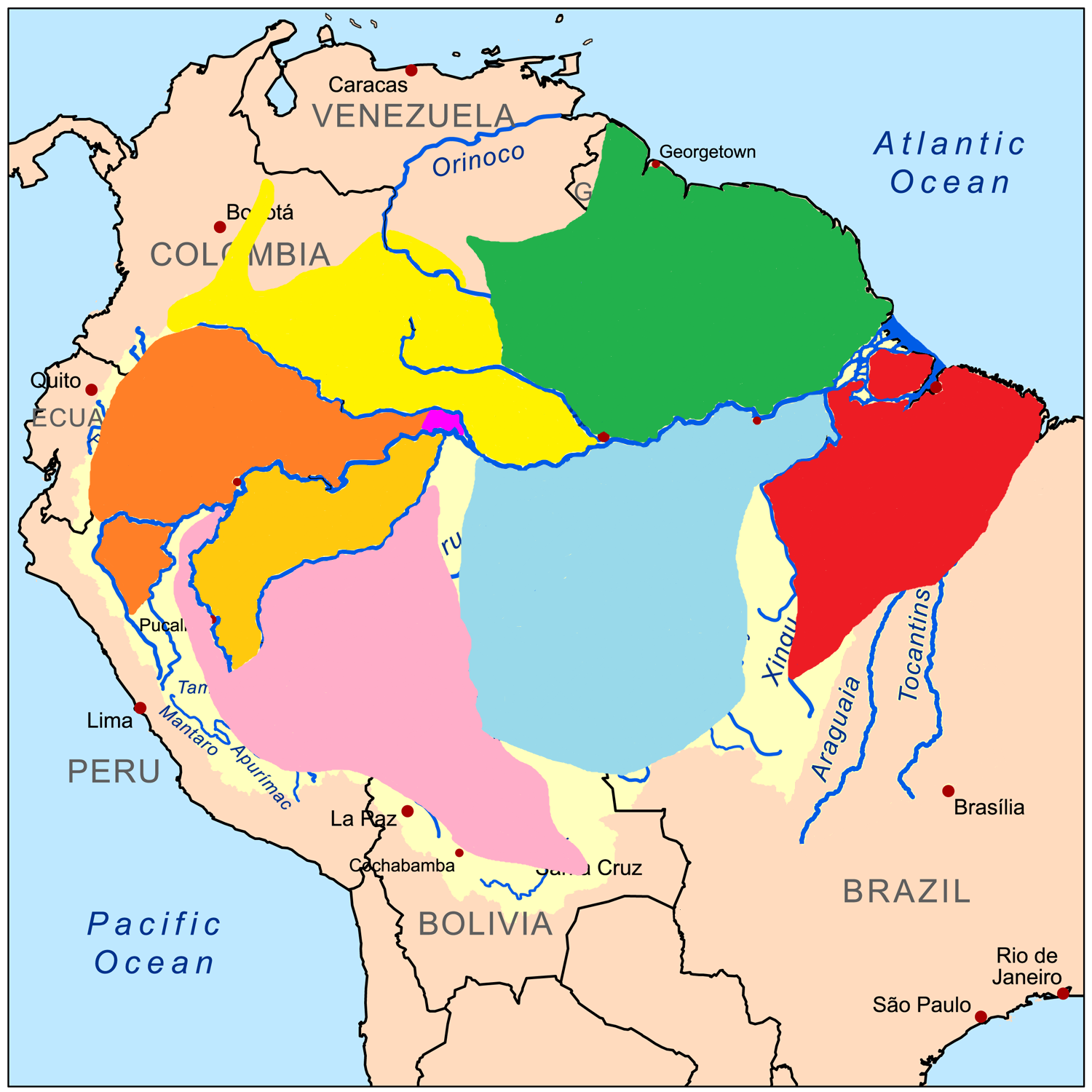
- Collins' squirrel monkey range shown in red

= Collins' squirrel monkey =

Species of New World monkey

Collins' squirrel monkey (Saimiri collinsii) is a species of squirrel monkey endemic to Brazil. It had been considered a subspecies of the common squirrel monkey (S. sciureus) until a genetic study by Jessica Lynch Alfaro et al. elevated it to species status.

Male Collins' squirrel monkeys have a head and body length of about 38 cm (15 in) with a 37.6 cm (14.8 in) tail. Females have a head and body length of about 27 cm (11 in) with a 41.3 cm (16.3 in) tail. Collins' squirrel monkeys eat palm fruits, legumes, insects, bird eggs and occasionally lizards.
