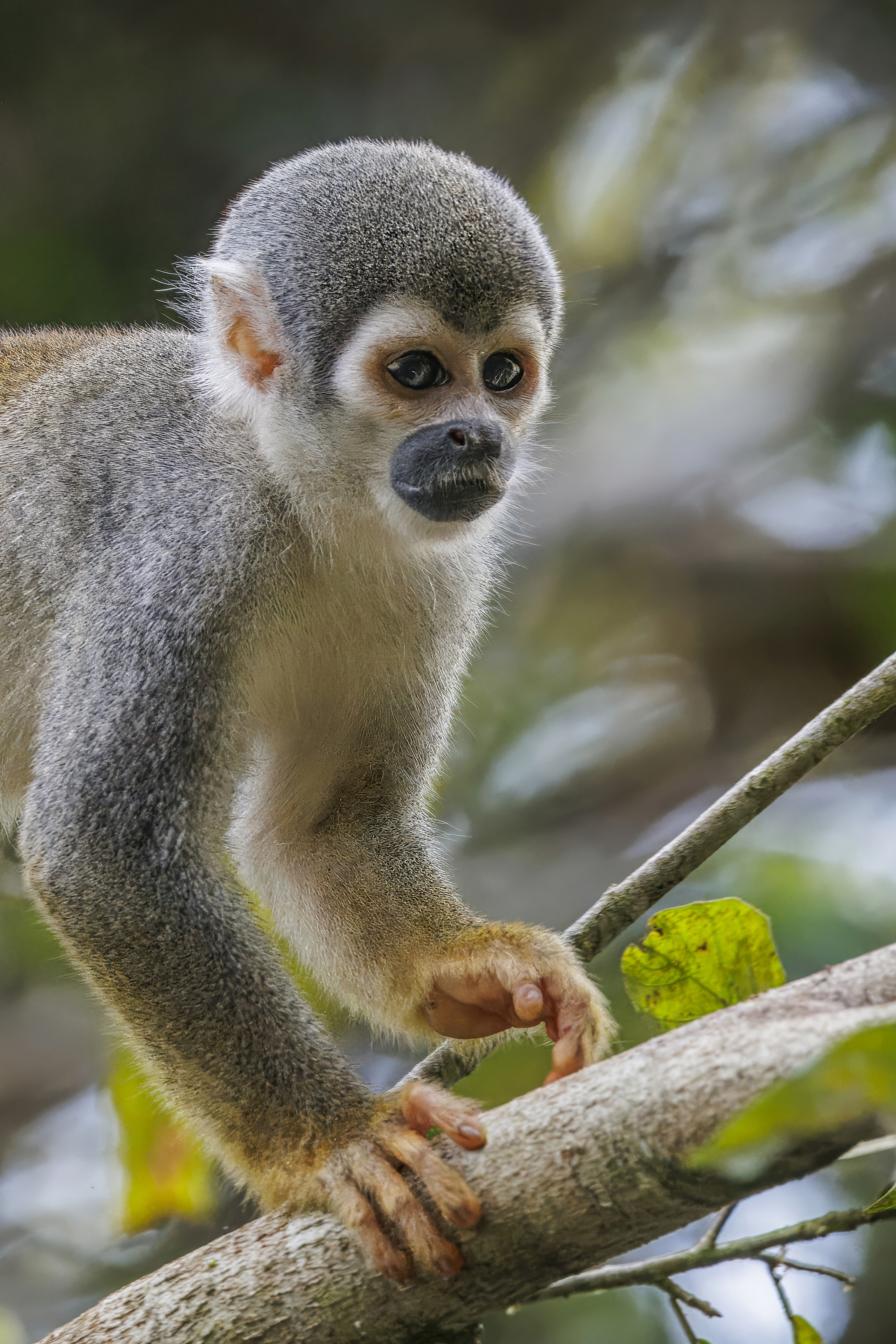

Scientific classification
- Kingdom: Animalia
- Phylum: Chordata
- Class: Mammalia
- Order: Primates
- Suborder: Haplorhini
- Infraorder: Simiiformes
- Family: Cebidae
- Genus: Saimiri
- Species: S. cassiquiarensis
- Subspecies: S. c. macrodon

Trinomial name
- Saimiri cassiquiarensis macrodon (Elliot, 1907)
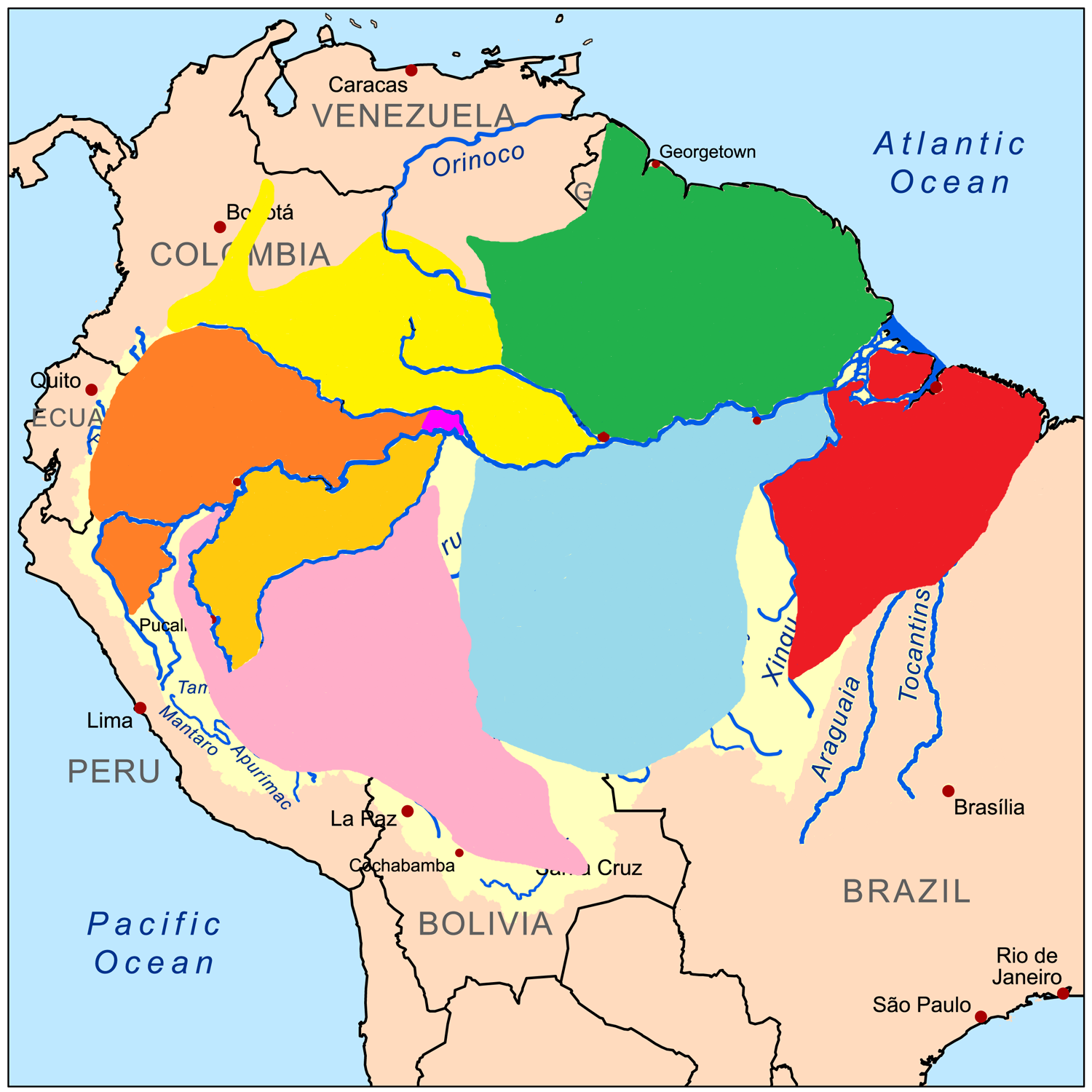
- Ecuadorian squirrel monkey range shown in orange

= Ecuadorian squirrel monkey =

Subspecies of New World monkey

The Ecuadorian squirrel monkey (Saimiri cassiquiarensis macrodon) is a type of squirrel monkey. It had been considered a subspecies of the Guianan squirrel monkey, Saimiri sciureus, but was elevated to a full species, S. macrodon, based on a 2009 study by Carretero-Pinzón, et al. Based on subsequent genetic research by Jessica Lynch Alfaro, et al it was again reclassified as a subspecies of Humboldt's squirrel monkey.

The Ecuadorian squirrel monkey lives in the western Brazilian Amazon, as well as southern Colombia, eastern Ecuador and northern and eastern Peru. It lives in humid tropical and subtropical forest, preferring dense forest but able to live in secondary forest and disturbed forest as well. It can live at elevations up to 1,200 m (3,900 ft), but where it has been studied in Ecuador it prefers elevations under 500 m (1,600 ft).

The Ecuadorian squirrel monkey has a head and body length of between 25 and 32 cm (9.8 and 12.6 in) with a tail length between 34 and 44 cm (13 and 17 in). Males weigh between 885 and 1,380 g (31.2 and 48.7 oz) and females weigh between 590 and 1,150 g (21 and 41 oz). Its coloration is similar to that of the Guianan squirrel monkey but its fur is darker.

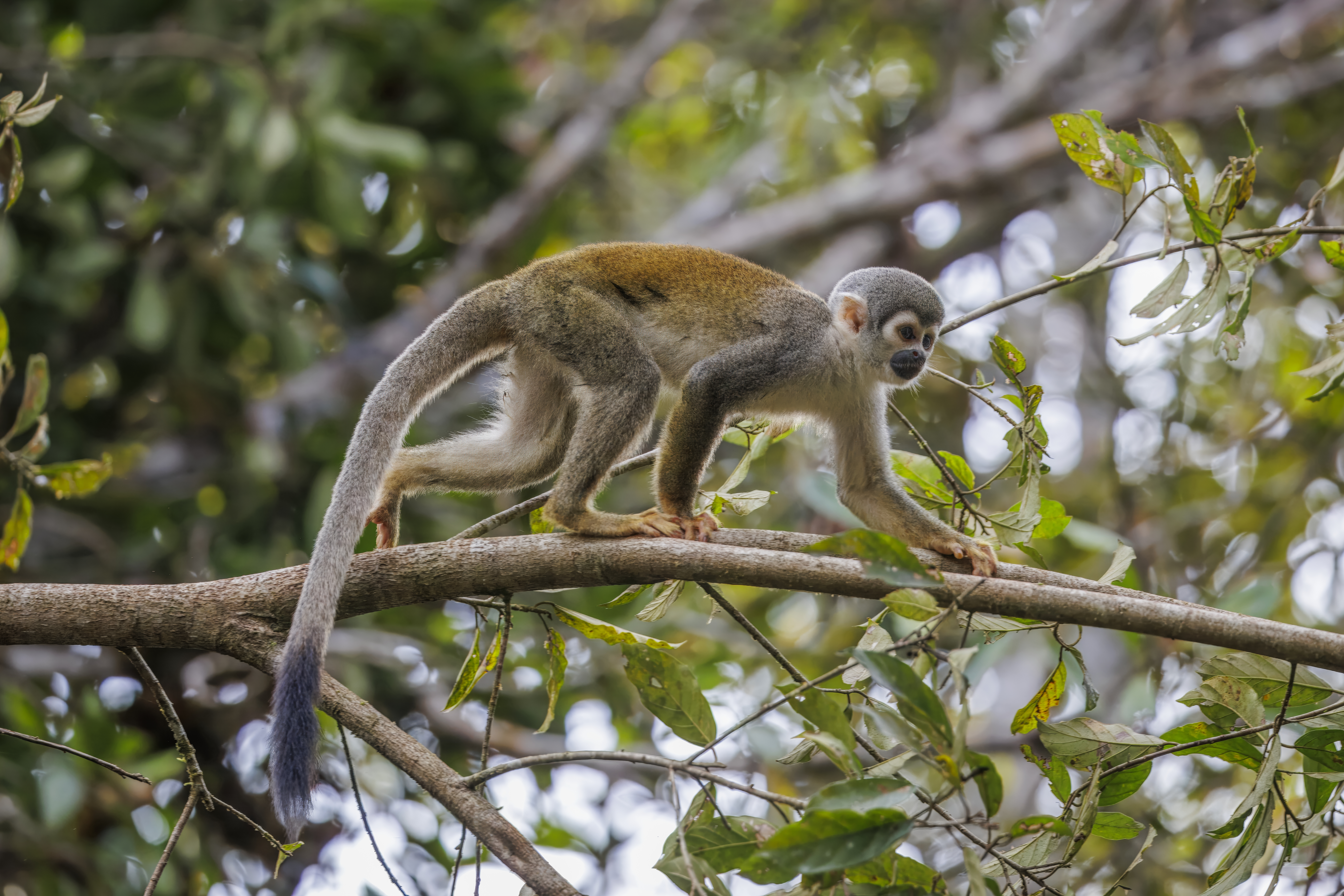
adult in Ecuador

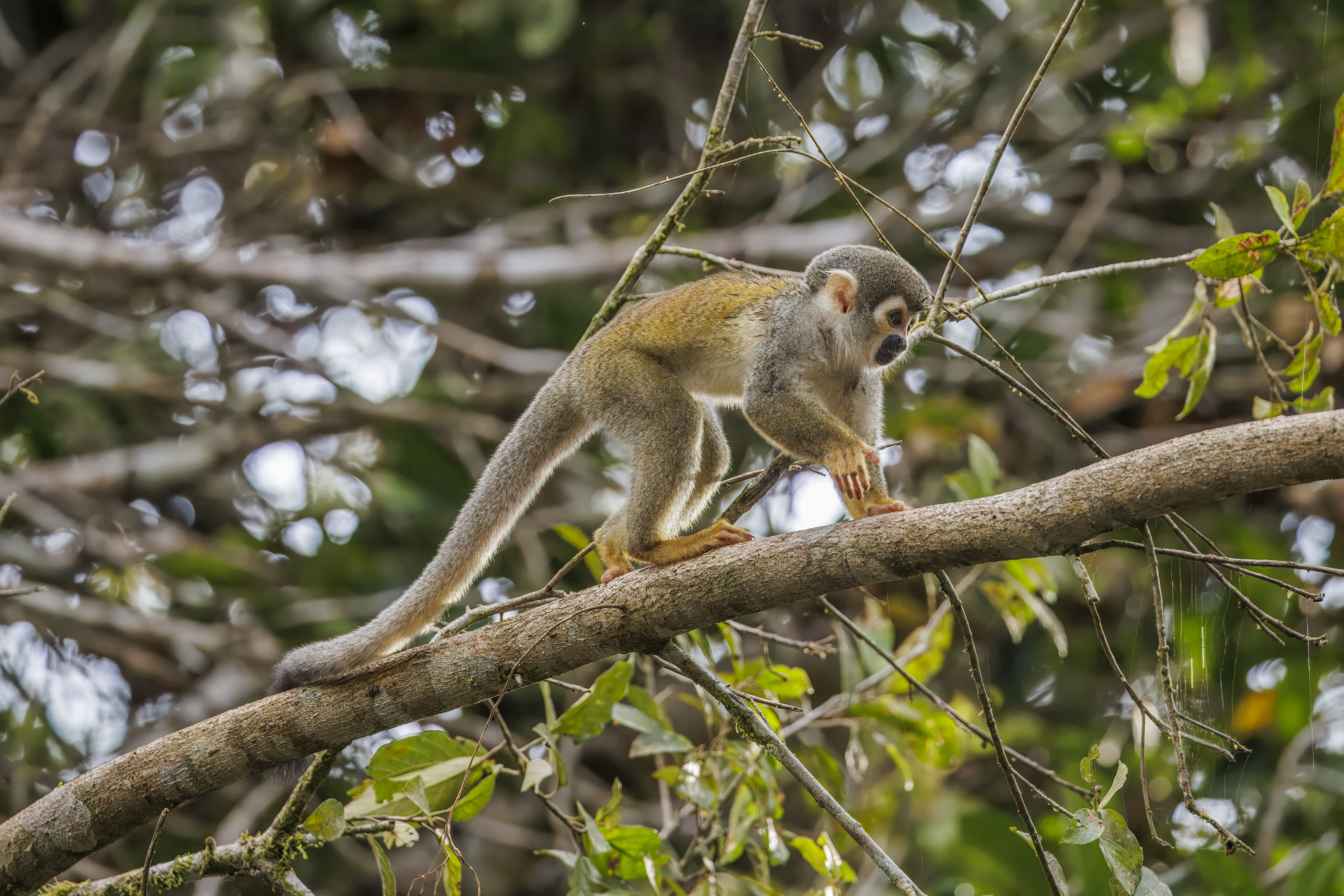
juvenile in Ecuador
