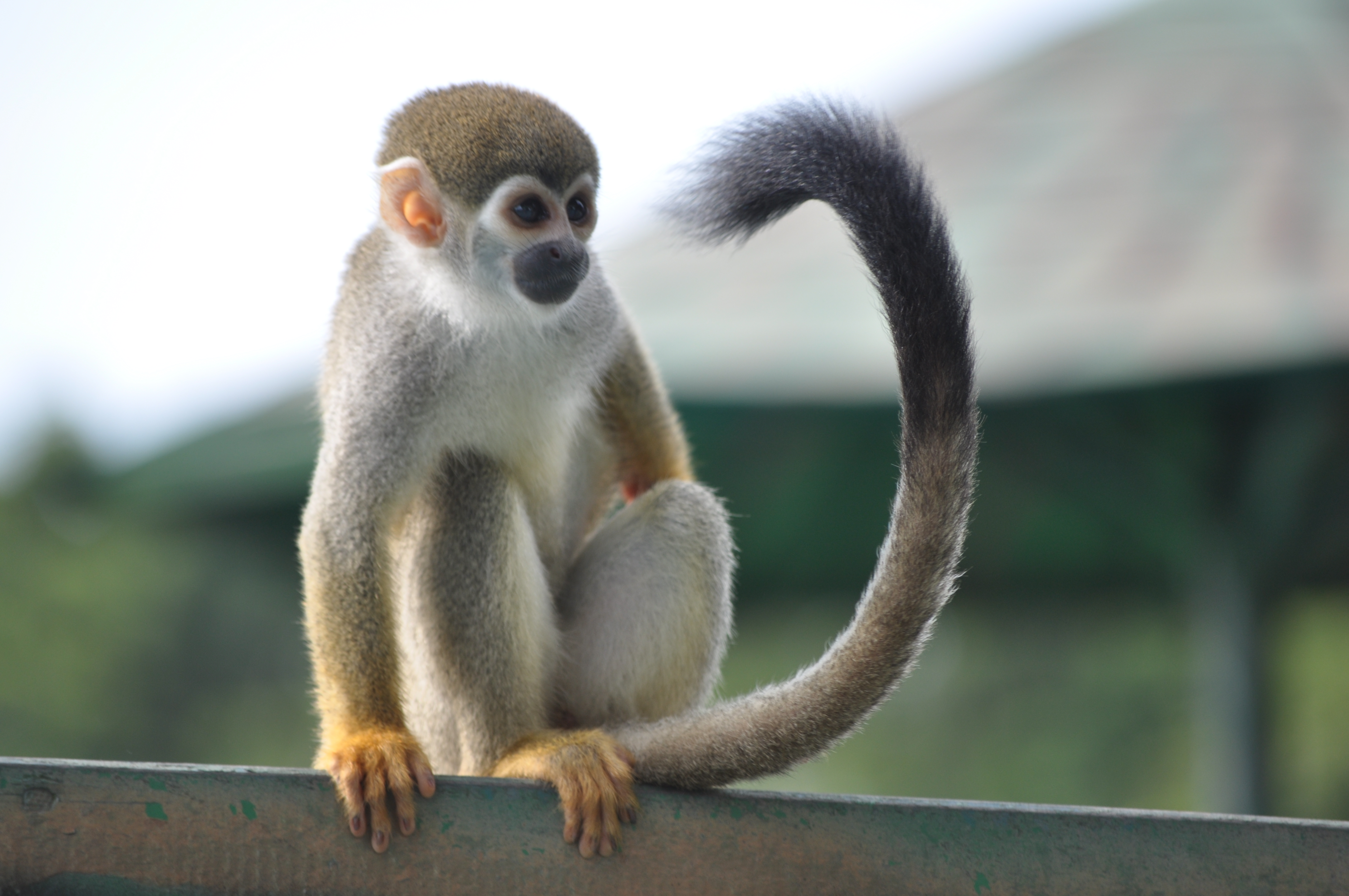

Conservation status
- Least Concern (IUCN 3.1)

Scientific classification
- Kingdom: Animalia
- Phylum: Chordata
- Class: Mammalia
- Infraclass: Placentalia
- Order: Primates
- Family: Cebidae
- Genus: Saimiri
- Species: S. cassiquiarensis

Binomial name
- Saimiri cassiquiarensis (Lesson, 1840)
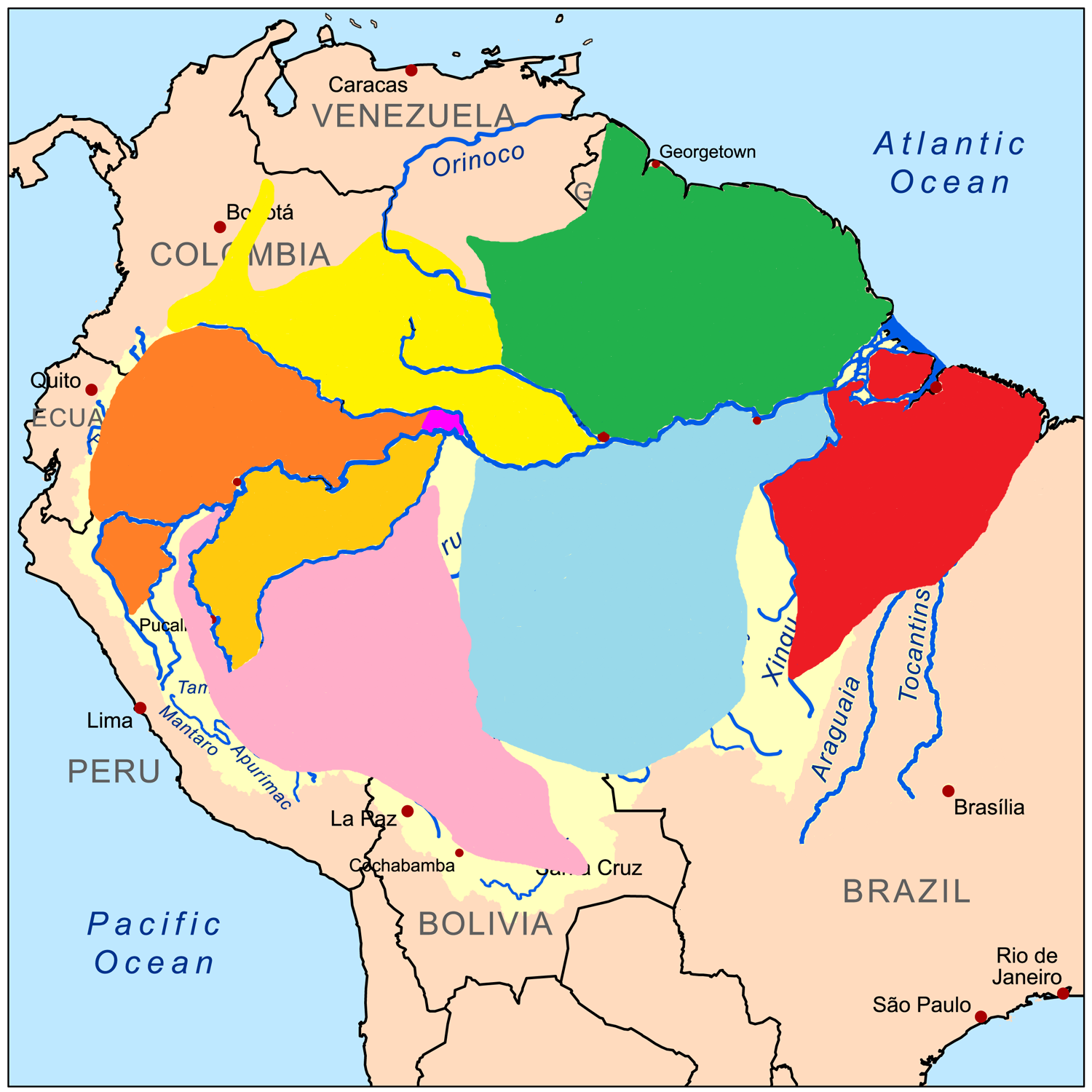
- Ecuadorian squirrel monkey range in orange; remainder of Humboldt's squirrel monkey range in yellow

= Humboldt's squirrel monkey =

Species of New World monkey

Humboldt's squirrel monkey (Saimiri cassiquiarensis) is a species of squirrel monkey from Brazil, Colombia, Ecuador, Peru and Venezuela. It had previously been considered a subspecies of the common squirrel monkey, S. sciureus, but was elevated to full species status based on a genetic study by Carretero-Pinzón in 2009. A genetic study by Jessica Lynch Alfaro, et al indicated that the Ecuadorian squirrel monkey may be synonymous with Saimiri cassiquiarensis. As of 2018, the Ecuadorian squirrel monkey is generally regarded as a subspecies of Humboldt's squirrel monkey, S. cassiquiarensis macrodon.

Humboldt's squirrel monkey have a head and body length of between 25 and 37 cm (9.8 and 14.6 in) with a tail between 36 and 45 cm (14 and 18 in). Its coloration is similar to that of the Guianan squirrel monkey but the fur on the base of the crown is golden yellow as compared with gray for the Guianan squirrel monkey. It eats fruits when available, primarily between January and June, and also eats insects. It is named after the Prussian naturalist and explorer Alexander von Humboldt (1769-1859).
