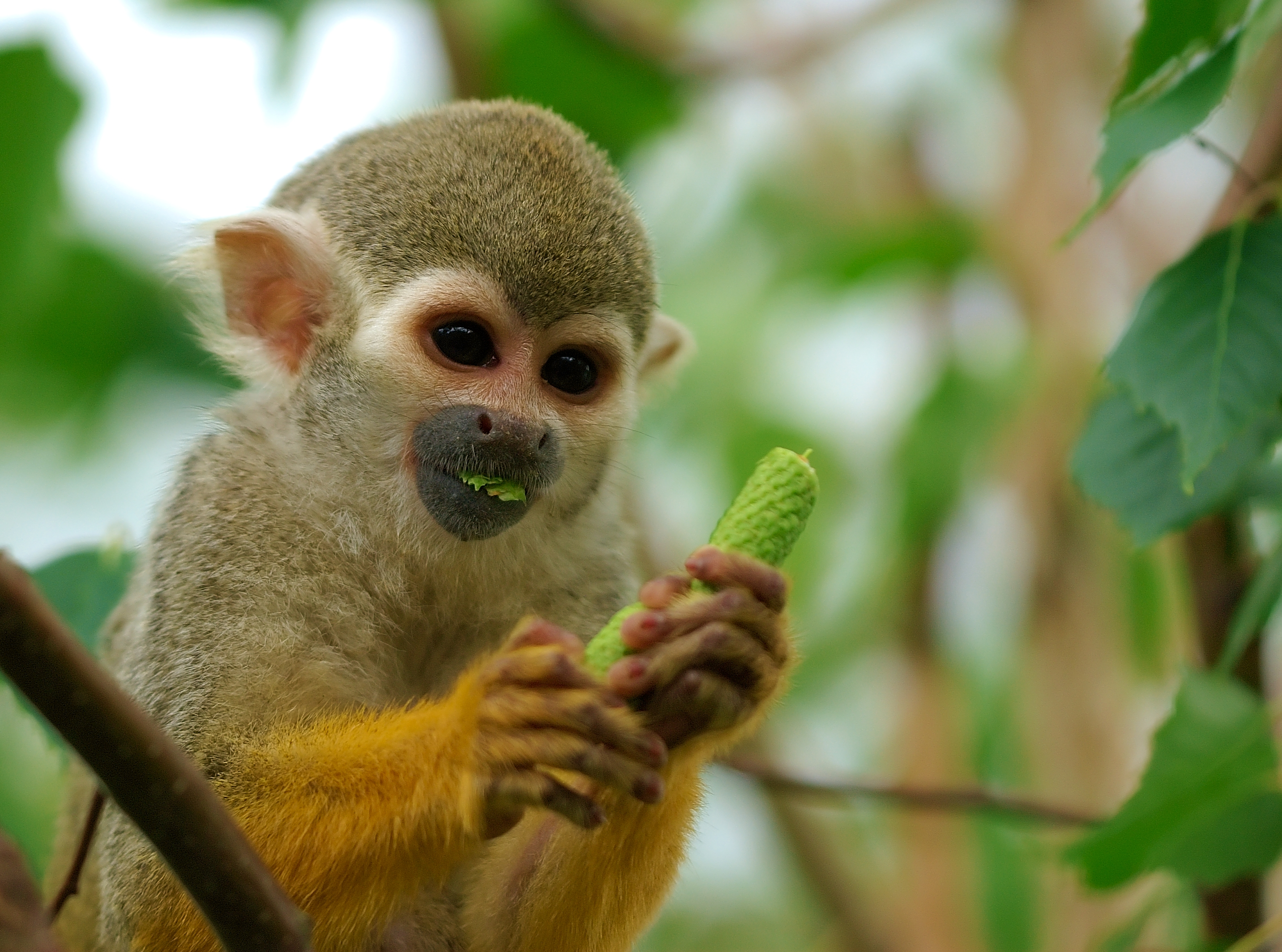
- Common squirrel monkey

Scientific classification
- Kingdom: Animalia
- Phylum: Chordata
- Class: Mammalia
- Order: Primates
- Family: Cebidae
- Subfamily: Saimiriinae; Miller, 1912 (1900)
- Genus: Saimiri; Voigt, 1831

Type species
- Simia sciurea Linnaeus, 1758

Species
- Saimiri boliviensis; Saimiri cassiquiarensis; Saimiri collinsi; Saimiri oerstedii; Saimiri sciureus; Saimiri ustus; Saimiri vanzolinii; † Saimiri annectens; † Saimiri fieldsi

Synonyms
- Laventiana Rosenberger, 1991; Neosaimiri Stirton, 1951

= Squirrel monkey =

Squirrel monkeys Temporal range: Miocene (Laventan to recent 13.8–0 Ma

Genus of primates

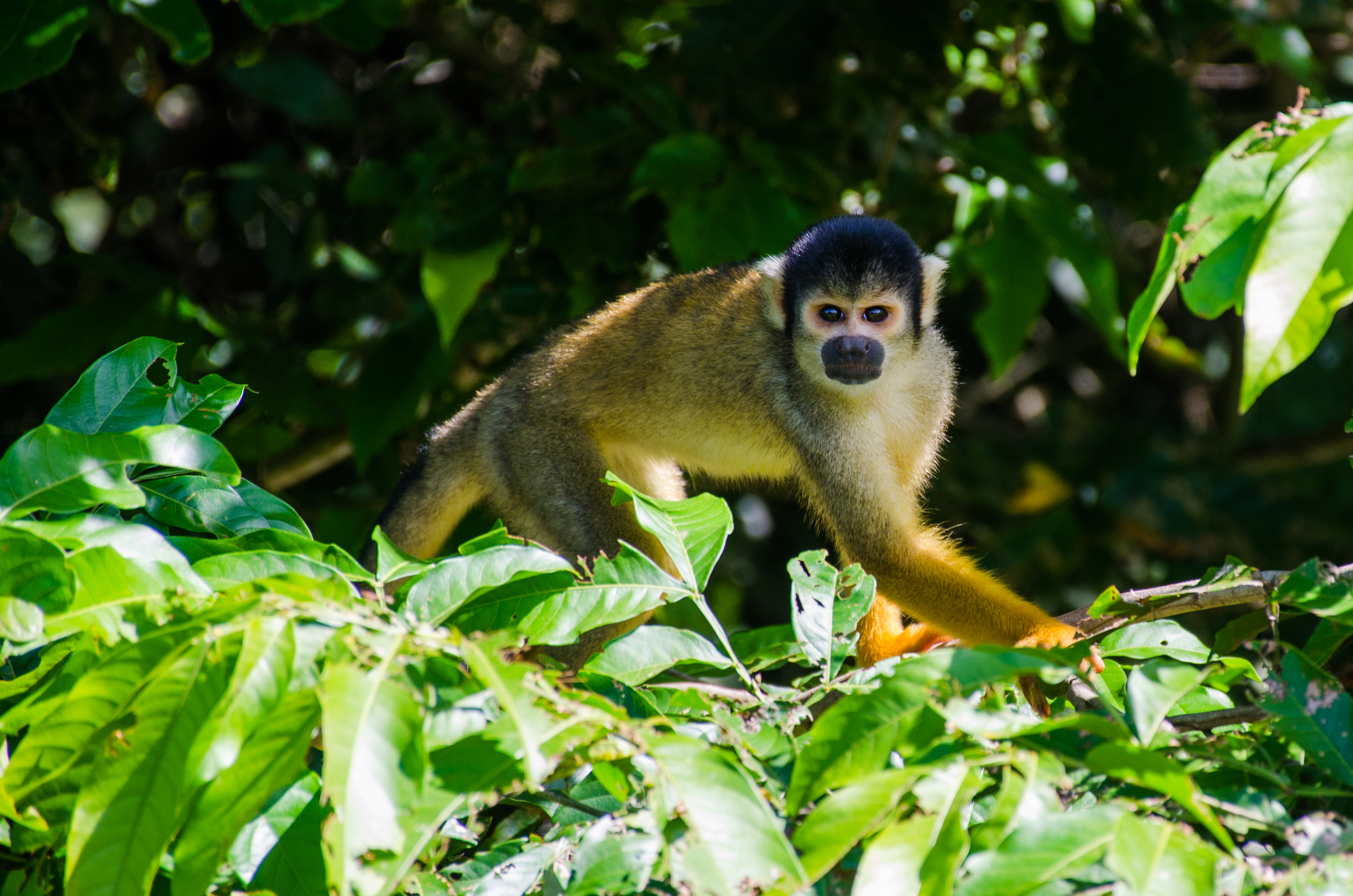
Squirrel monkey in Yacuma Park, Bolivia

Squirrel monkeys are New World monkeys of the genus Saimiri. Saimiri is the only genus in the subfamily Saimiriinae. The name of the genus is of Tupi origin (sai-mirím or çai-mbirín, with sai meaning 'monkey' and mirím meaning 'small') and was also used as an English name by early researchers.

Squirrel monkeys live in the tropical forests of Central and South America in the canopy layer. Most species have parapatric or allopatric ranges in the Amazon, while S. oerstedii is found disjunctly in Costa Rica and Panama.

There are two main groups of squirrel monkeys recognized. They are differentiated based on the shape of the white coloration above the eyes. In total there are five recognized species. Squirrel monkeys have short and close fur colored black at the shoulders, yellow or orange fur along the back and extremities, and white on the face.

Squirrel monkeys have determined breeding seasons which involve large fluctuations in hormones and there is evidence of sexual dimorphism between males and females.

Squirrel monkeys can only sweat through the palms of their hands and feet. This can have the effect of making their hands and feet feel damp to the touch. Squirrel monkeys must make use of other thermoregulation techniques such as behavioral changes and urine washing. These monkeys live in habitats of high temperatures and high humidity, making it essential for them to maintain proper osmoregulation if conditions pass certain thresholds. Color vision studies have also been performed on squirrel monkeys for the purpose of better understanding vision ailments in humans.

The common squirrel monkey is commonly captured for the pet trade and for medical research, but it is not threatened. Two squirrel monkey species are endangered: the Central American squirrel monkey and the black squirrel monkey are listed as vulnerable by the IUCN.

== Evolutionary history ==
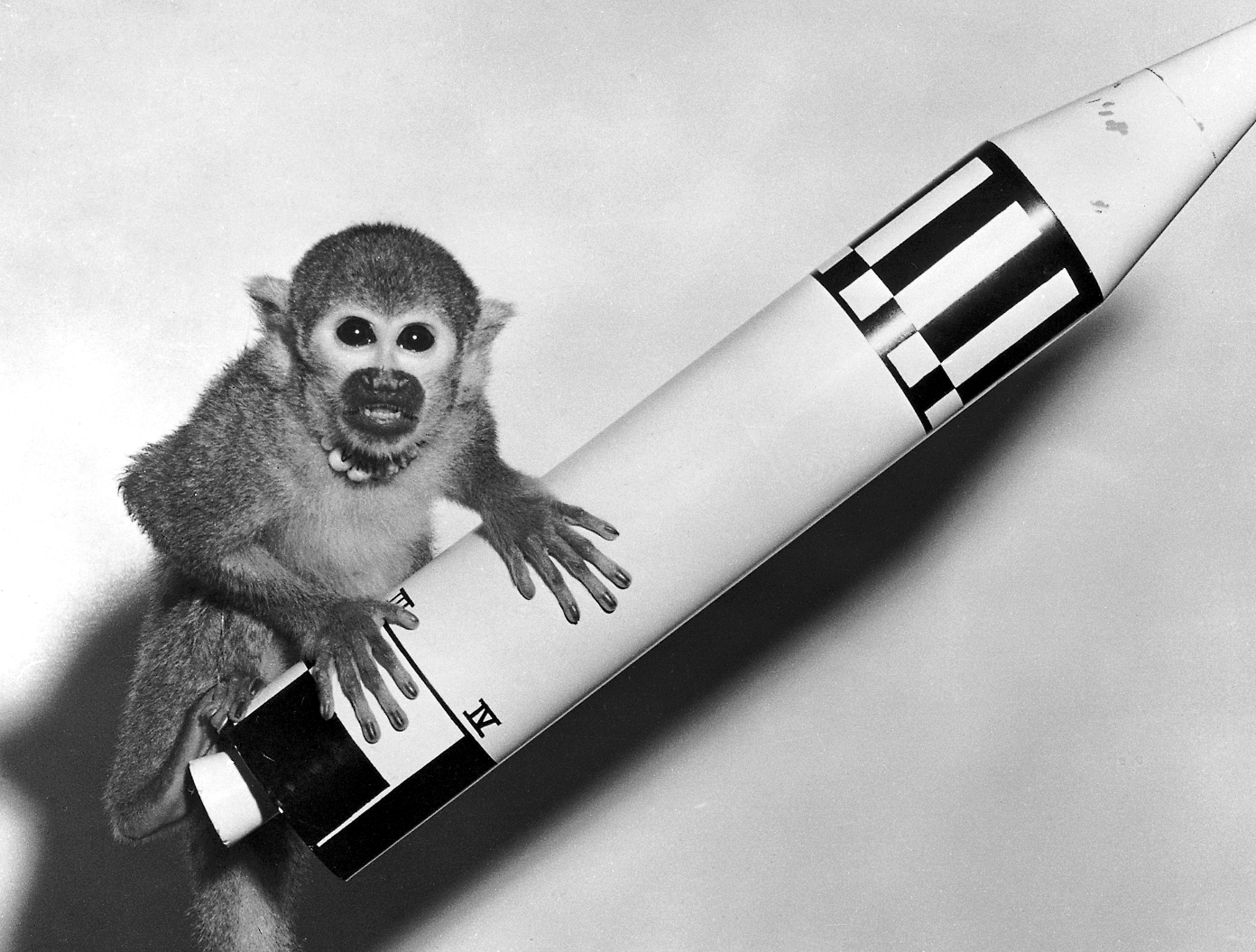
Miss Baker, an 'astronaut' squirrel monkey, rode into space as part of the United States space program, and returned safely.

=== Taxonomy ===
Until 1984, all South American squirrel monkeys were considered part of a single widespread species, and many zoologists considered the Central American squirrel monkey to be a member of that single species as well. The two main groups currently recognized can be separated by the white above the eyes; it is shaped as a Gothic ("pointed") arch in the S. sciureus group, while it is shaped as a Roman ("rounded") arch in the S. boliviensis group. Mammal Species of the World (2005) recognized five species.

Subsequent taxonomic research has recognized Saimiri sciureus cassiquiarensis as a separate species Saimiri cassiquiarensis, and also recognized an additional species, Collins' squirrel monkey Saimiri collinsi that had previously been considered to be within S. sciureus. Some more recent taxonomies also recognize Saimiri sciureus macrodon as a separate species Saimiri macrodon, but others recognize S. macrodon to be a synonym of Saimiri cassiquiarensis.

- Genus Saimiri
  - S. sciureus group
    - Central American squirrel monkey, Saimiri oerstedii
      - Black-crowned Central American squirrel monkey, Saimiri oerstedii oerstedii
      - Grey-crowned Central American squirrel monkey, Saimiri oerstedii citrinellus
    - Guianan squirrel monkey, Saimiri sciureus
      - Saimiri sciureus sciureus
      - Saimiri sciureus albigena
      - Ecuadorian squirrel monkey, Saimiri sciureus macrodon
    - Humboldt's squirrel monkey, Saimiri cassiquiarensis
    - Bare-eared squirrel monkey, Saimiri ustus
    - Collins' squirrel monkey, Saimiri collinsi
  - S. boliviensis group
    - Black-capped squirrel monkey, Saimiri boliviensis
      - Bolivian squirrel monkey, Saimiri boliviensis boliviensis
      - Peruvian squirrel monkey, Saimiri boliviensis peruviensis
    - Black squirrel monkey, Saimiri vanzolinii
  - Fossil species
    - †Saimiri annectens, Honda Group, Kay and Meldrum 1997
    - †Saimiri fieldsi, Honda Group, Stirton 1951

=== Evolution ===
The crown group of the extant squirrel monkeys appears to have diverged around 1.5 million years ago. Diversification of squirrel monkey species appears to have occurred during the Pleistocene Epoch, likely due to climatic changes associated with interglacial periods in South America at the time. The origin of squirrel monkeys in Central America is unclear, but a possible hypothesis is human transport. More genetic work needs to be done on the subject to reveal a true answer.S. boliviensis appears to be the first diverging species in the group. S. oerstedii and S. s. sciureus, are sister species. S. s. macrodon is the sister species to the S. oerstedii / S. s. sciureus clade.

== Description ==
A squirrel monkey's fur is short and close, coloured black at the shoulders and yellowish orange on its back and extremities. The upper parts of their heads are hairy. This black-and-white face gives them the name "death's head monkey" in several Germanic languages (e.g., German Totenkopfaffen, Swedish dödskalleapor, Dutch doodshoofdaapjes) and Slovenian (smrtoglavka).

Squirrel monkeys grow from 25 to 35 centimetres (9.8 to 13.8 in) long, plus a 35 to 42 centimetres (14 to 17 in) tail. Male squirrel monkeys weigh 750 to 1,100 grams (26 to 39 oz). Females weigh 500 to 750 grams (18 to 26 oz). Both males and females are equipped with long and hairy tails, flat nails, and pointed claws.

Female squirrel monkeys have pseudo-penises, which they use to display dominance over smaller monkeys, in much the same way that the male squirrel monkeys display their dominance.

== Behaviour, ecology, and physiology ==
Like most of their New World monkey relatives, squirrel monkeys are diurnal and arboreal. Unlike other New World monkeys, their tail is not used for climbing but as a kind of "balancing pole" and also as a tool. Their movements in the branches can be very rapid.

Squirrel monkeys live together in multi-male/multi-female groups with up to 500 members. These large groups, however, can occasionally break into smaller troupes. The groups have a number of vocal calls, including warning sounds to protect the group from large falcons, which are a natural threat. Their small body size also makes them susceptible to predators such as snakes and felids. For marking territory, squirrel monkeys rub their tail and their skin with their own urine.

Squirrel monkeys are omnivores, eating primarily fruits and insects. Occasionally, they also eat seeds, leaves, flowers, buds, nuts, and eggs.

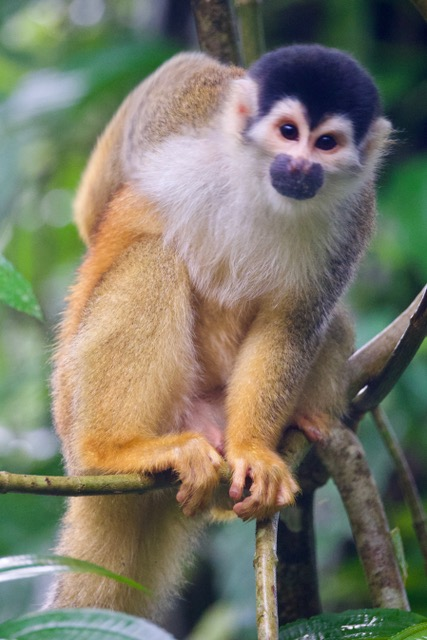
Sexual dimorphism in squirrel monkeys: larger adult male. Spotted in Piedras Blancas National Park, Golfo Dulce, Costa Rica

=== Reproduction ===
Squirrel monkey mating is subject to seasonal influences. Squirrel monkeys reach sexual maturity at ages of 2–2.5 years for females and age 3.5–4 years for males. Females give birth to young during the rainy season, after a 150- to 170-day gestation. Only the mothers care for the young. Saimiri oerstedti are weaned by 4 months of age, while S. boliviensis are not fully weaned until 18 months old. Squirrel monkeys live to about 15 years old in the wild, and over 20 years in captivity. Menopause in females probably occurs in the mid-teens. Studies show that Saimiri collinsi time the weaning of their young with the period of time when there will be maximum fruit availability in the environment. This reduces the energetic struggles that newly weaned juveniles will face when transitioning from a milk diet where they are dependent on their mother for food to a more diverse diet where they have to forage for food. There is evidence that squirrel monkeys show sexual dimorphism during the breeding season. In the months leading up to breeding and in the months of breeding, sexually mature adult males have been recorded to increase in size by significant amounts relative to females. These size changes are caused by seasonal fluctuations in androgen hormones synthesized in the hypothalamus, pituitary, adrenal and gonadal axes. The fluctuations include increases in the concentrations of testosterone, androstenedione, and dehydroepiandrosterone levels in sexually mature males during the breeding season, peaking in January. Following the breeding season, these androgen concentrations drop. The evolutionary reasoning for these size changes in sexually mature males is suggested to be both intra-sexual selections among males and also female choice selection, as the larger males are more likely to be preferred by females and partake in more copulations. There is not clear evidence yet as to why females choose larger males, but a leading hypothesis is that the larger males are more likely to have better vigilance for their young.

=== Thermoregulation ===
Squirrel monkeys can only sweat through the palms of their hands and the soles of their feet. Sweating in these areas alone does not provide enough cooling for the monkeys to survive in the high temperature environments of South and Central America, requiring them to use other methods to thermoregulate. They will use behavioral tactics such as seeking out shaded areas sheltered from the sun and also make use of postural changes to better dissipate heat from their body. They will also make use of a technique to maximize evaporative cooling known as urine washing. The monkeys will urinate on their hands and rub the urine over the soles of their feet. The urine is then evaporated off the body in a cooling process. Studies have shown this behavior to be maximized during times of high temperature, highlighting its importance as a thermoregulatory behavior.

=== Osmoregulation ===
Squirrel monkeys are subject to both high temperatures and high humidity in their natural habitat. The humidity can range from 70% saturation in the 'dry' season up to 90% in the 'wet' season. Squirrel monkeys are able to tolerate up to 75% humidity with small adjustments in behavior and physiology that increase in significance as the humidity goes up. When reaching approximately 95% humidity, the monkeys have more drastic changes in osmoregulation in order to maintain homeostasis. As evaporative water loss decreases at these high levels of saturation, the monkeys will take in less water and create a more concentrated urine in order to maintain proper ion and water levels inside the body.

=== Cooperation studies ===
Cooperation is largely evident in human primates. Squirrel monkeys do not often display cooperation in the wild, while many other nonhuman primates do. Studies have been done to suggest that female squirrel monkeys show disadvantageous inequity aversion as it pertains to food rewards. However, the same could not be said for male squirrel monkeys. More studies need to be done on squirrel monkey behavior to determine why squirrel monkeys rarely show cooperation, and whether disadvantageous inequity aversion is a relevant factor.

=== Colour vision ===
Colour vision in squirrel monkeys has been extensively studied as a stand-in for human ailments. In humans, two genes for colour vision are found on the X chromosome. Typically, one gene (OPN1LW) produces a pigment that is most sensitive to the 564 nm wavelength, while the other gene (OPN1MW) produces a pigment most sensitive to 534 nm. In squirrel monkeys, there is only one gene on the X chromosome but it exists in three varieties: one is most sensitive to 538 nm, one to 551 nm, and one to 561 nm. Since males have only one X chromosome, they are dichromatic, although with different sensitivities. Females have two X chromosomes, so some of them can have copies of two different alleles. The three alleles seem to be equally common, leading to one-third of females being dichromatic, while two-thirds are trichromatic. Recently, gene therapy has given the human OPN1LW gene to adult male squirrel monkeys, producing behaviour consistent with trichromatic colour vision.

== Gallery ==
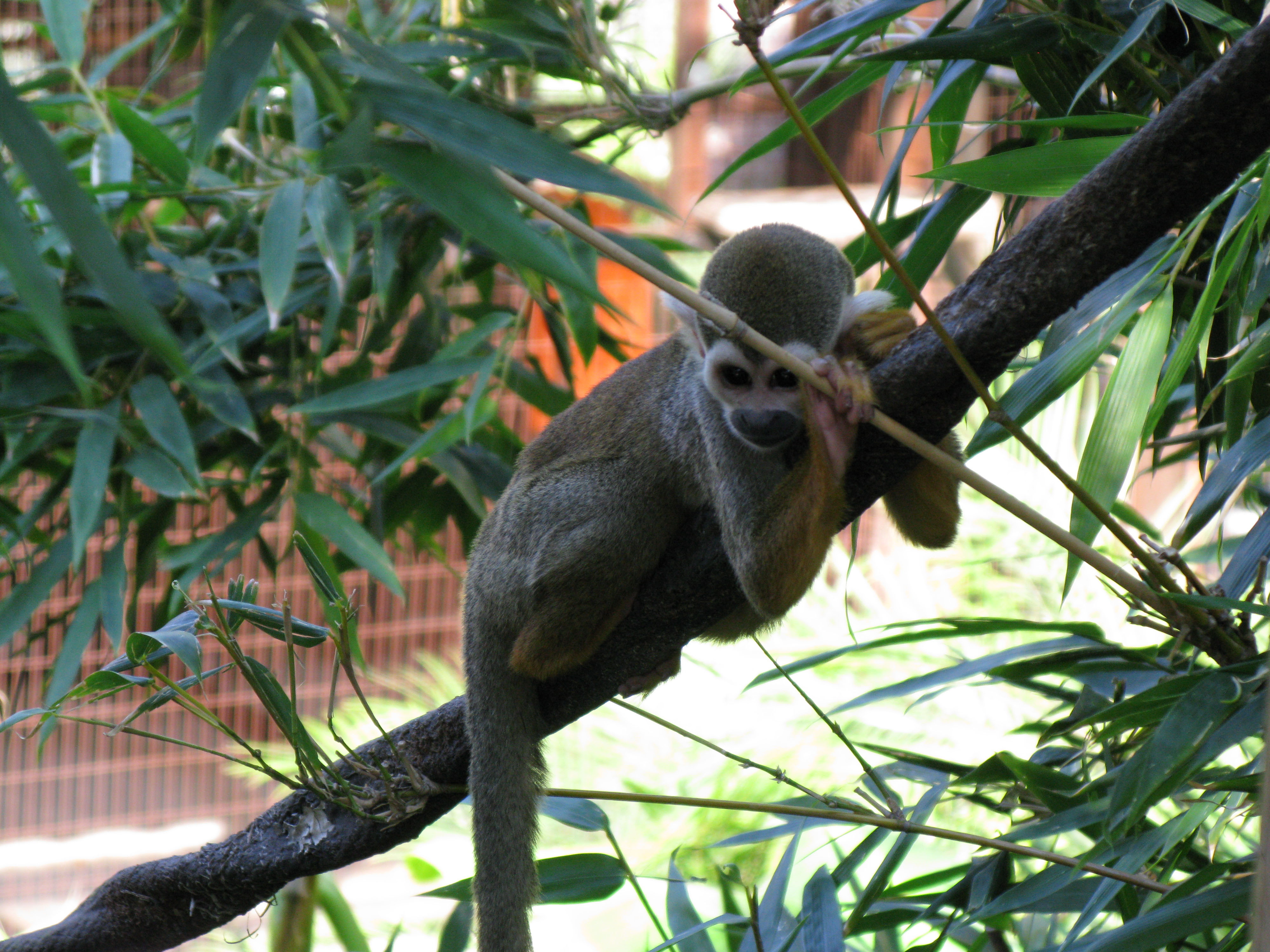
At the Phoenix Zoo

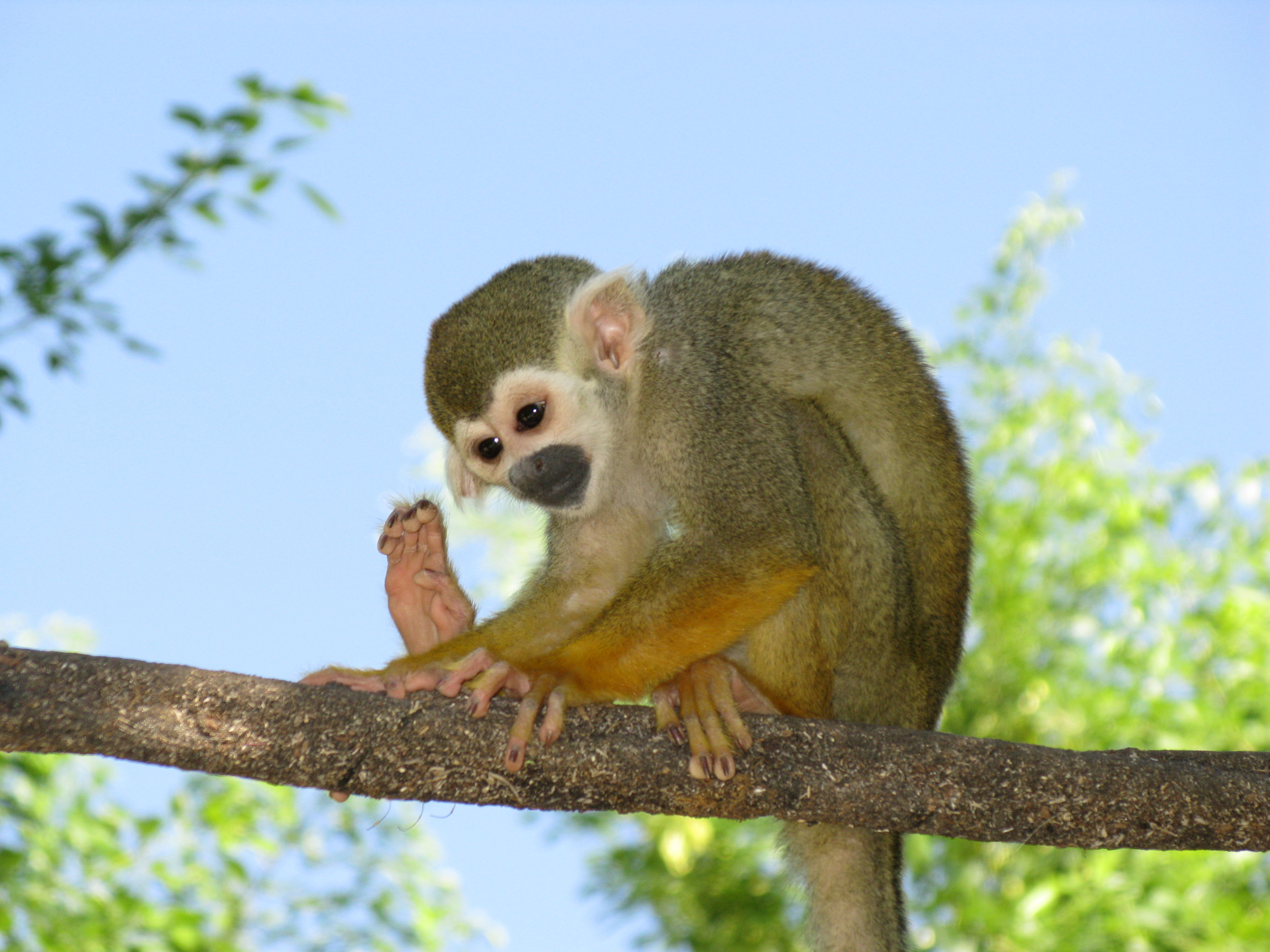
At the Phoenix Zoo

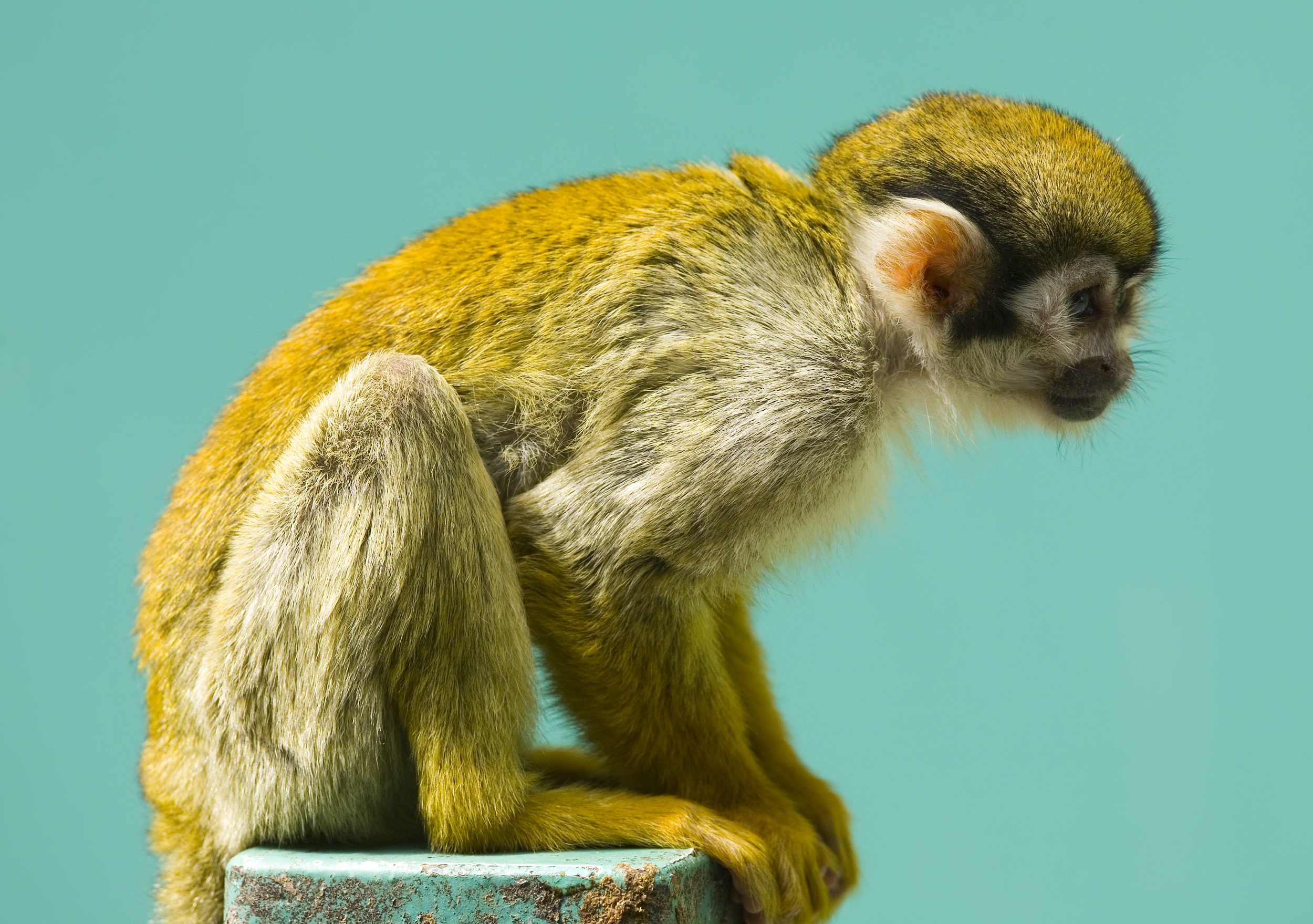
At the Fuji Safari Park, Japan

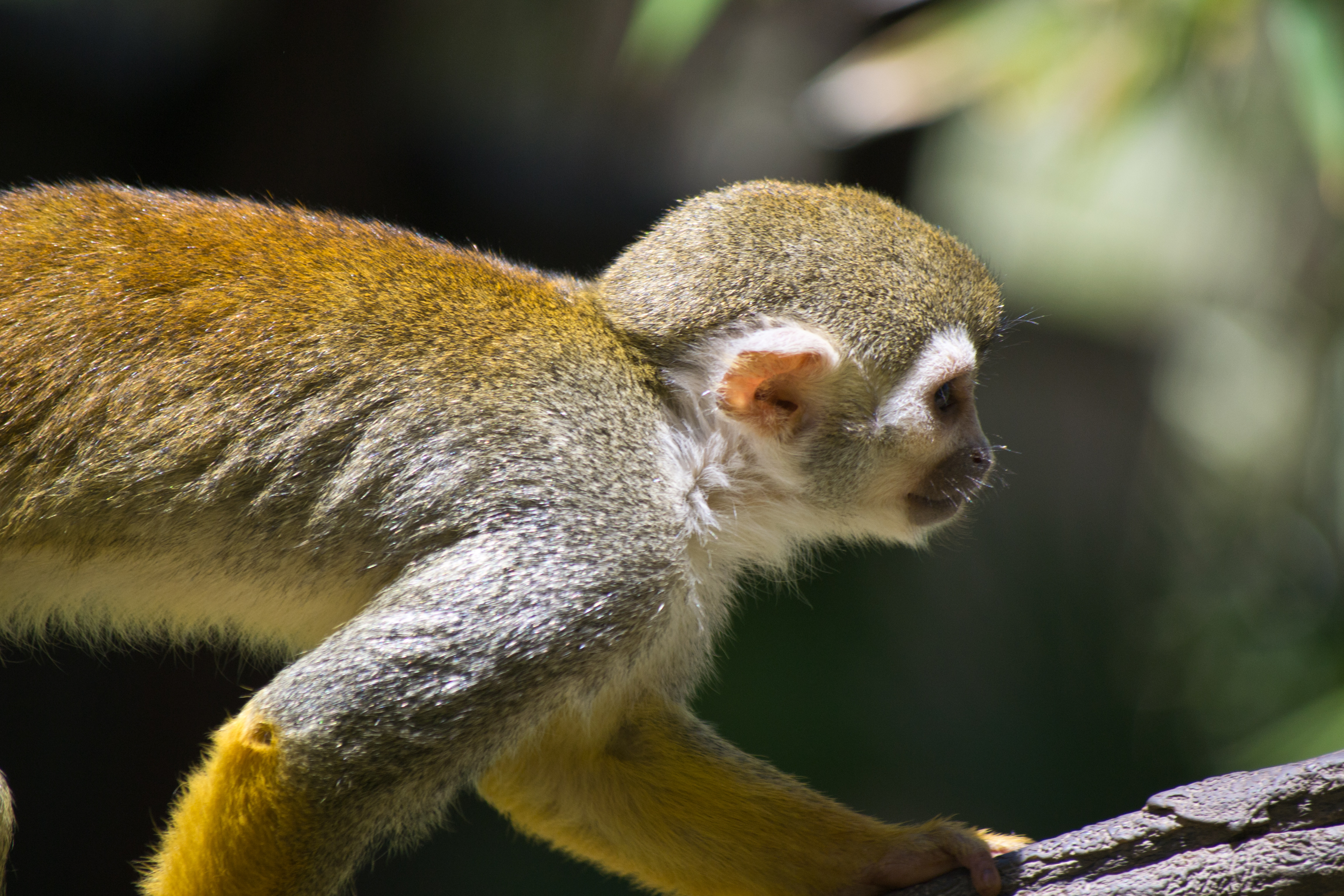
At the Phoenix Zoo

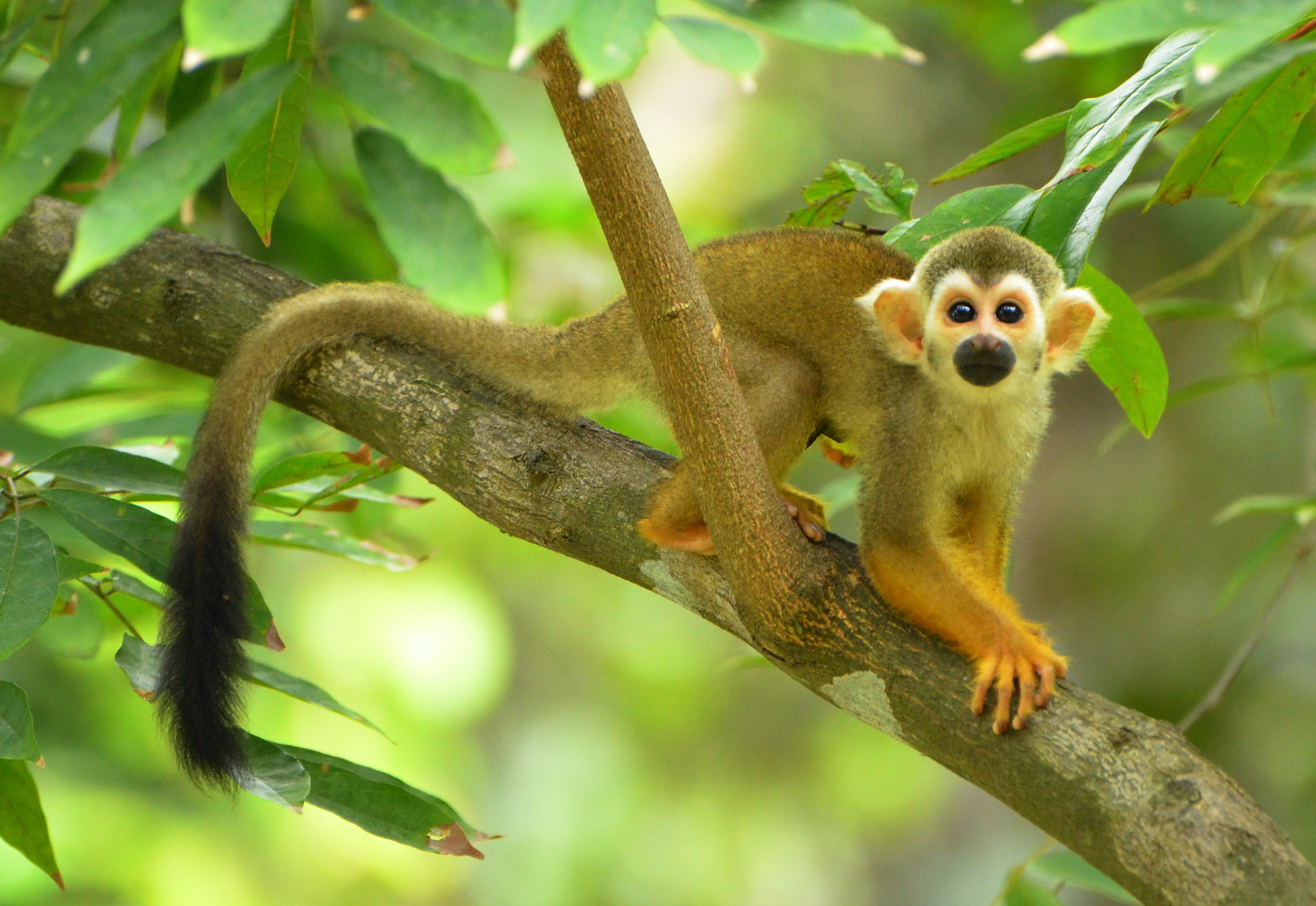
At Ubon Zoo, Thailand
