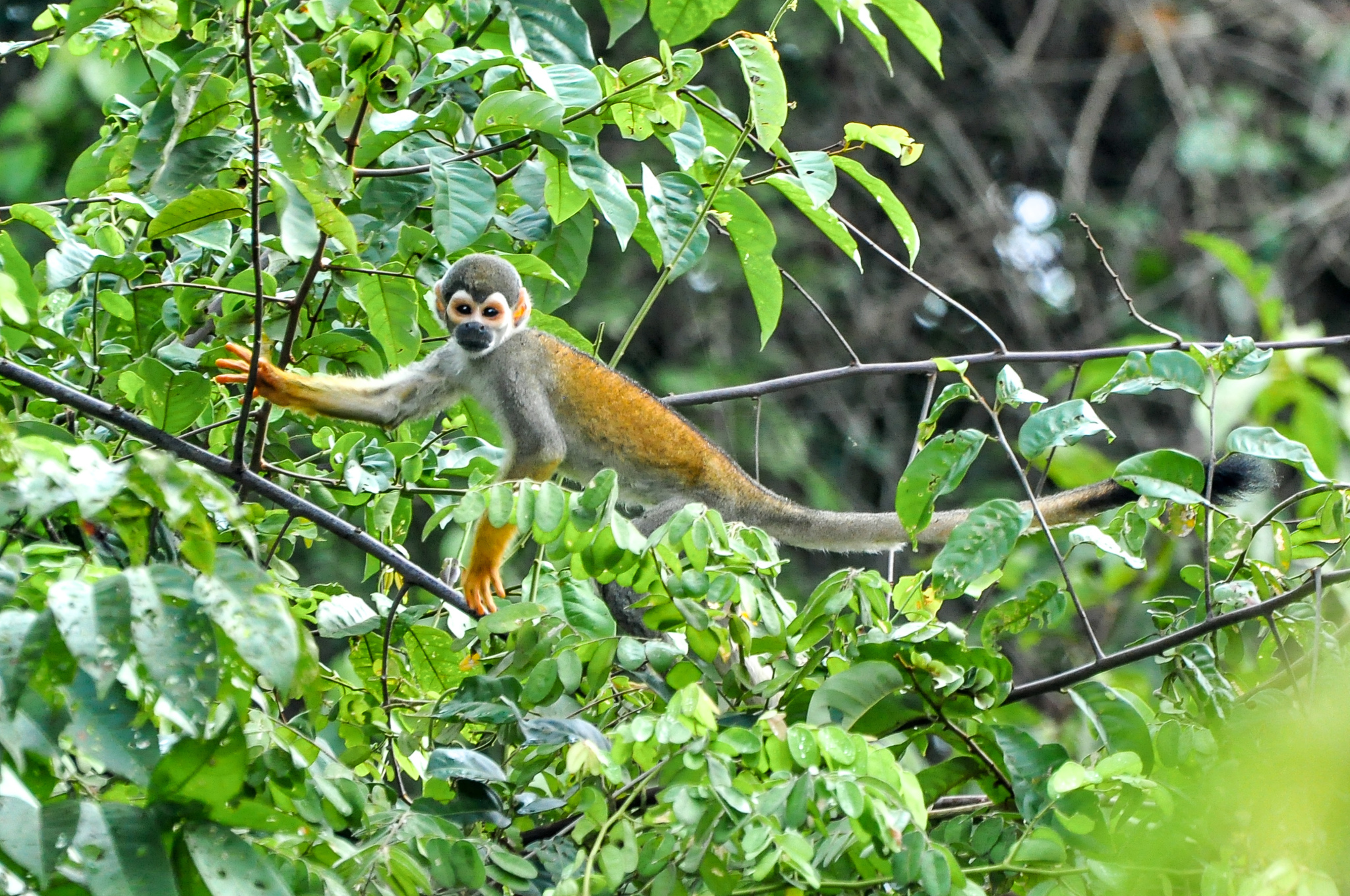

Conservation status
- Near Threatened (IUCN 3.1)

Scientific classification
- Kingdom: Animalia
- Phylum: Chordata
- Class: Mammalia
- Infraclass: Placentalia
- Order: Primates
- Family: Cebidae
- Genus: Saimiri
- Species: S. ustus

Binomial name
- Saimiri ustus (I. Geoffroy, 1843)
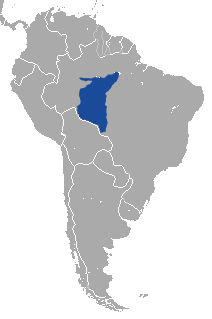
- Bare-eared squirrel monkey range

= Bare-eared squirrel monkey =

Species of New World monkey

The bare-eared squirrel monkey (Saimiri ustus) is a squirrel monkey endemic to Brazil and possibly eastern Bolivia.
