= List of Central American monkey species =

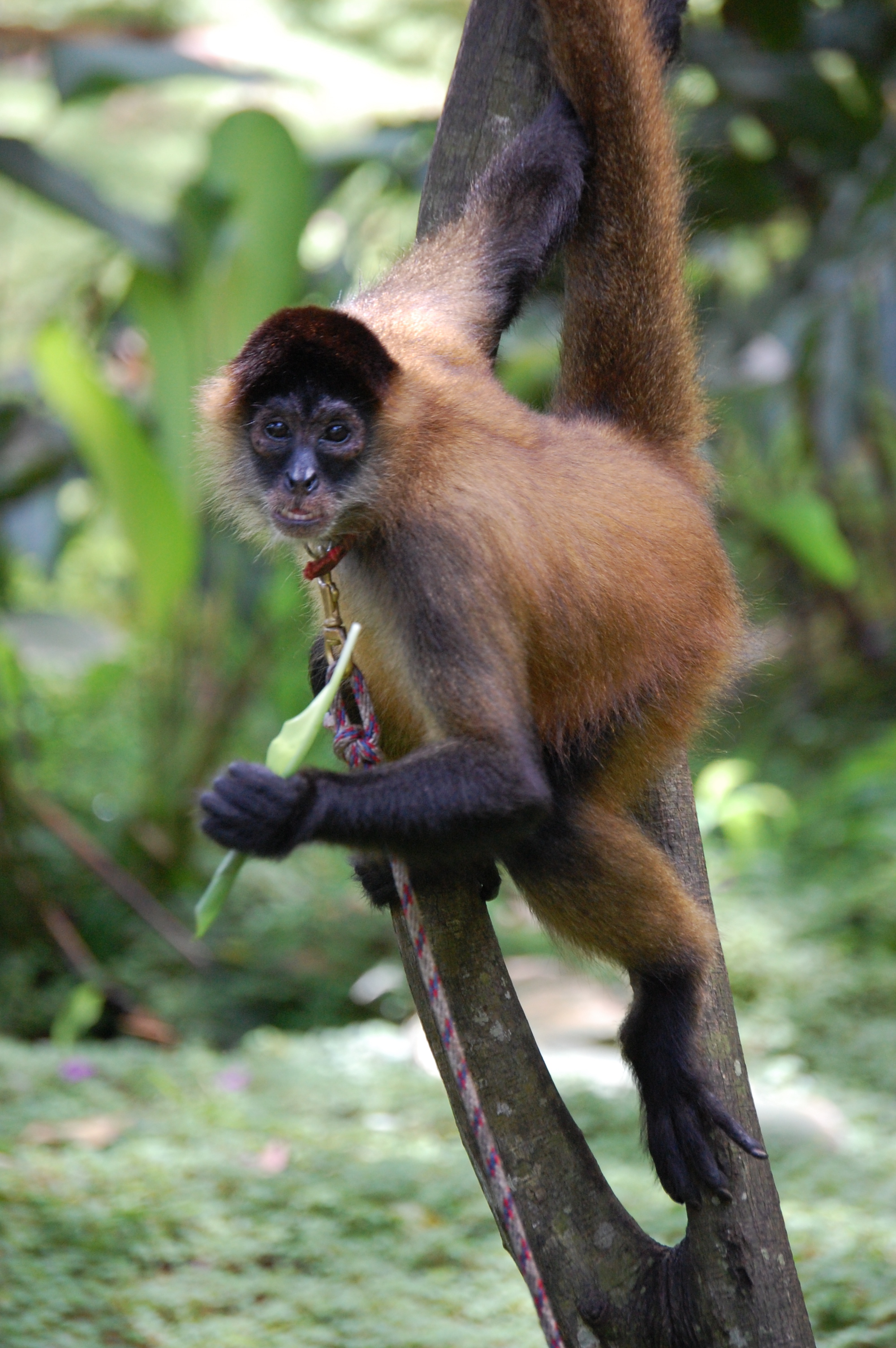
Geoffroy's spider monkey (Ateles geoffroyi) is found in all seven Central American countries.

At least seven monkey species are native to Central America. An eighth species, the Coiba Island howler (Alouatta coibensis) is often recognized, but some authorities treat it as a subspecies of the mantled howler, (A. palliata). A ninth species, the black-headed spider monkey (Ateles fusciceps) is also often recognized, but some authorities regard it as a subspecies of Geoffroy's spider monkey (A. geoffroyi). In addition, two species of white-faced capuchin monkey have been generally recognized since the 2010s although some primatologists consider these to be a single species. Taxonomically, all Central American monkey species are classified as New World monkeys, and they belong to four families. Five species belong to the family Atelidae, which includes the howler monkeys, spider monkeys, woolly monkeys and muriquis. Three species belong to the family Cebidae, the family that includes the capuchin monkeys and squirrel monkeys. One species each belongs to the night monkey family, Aotidae, and the tamarin and marmoset family, Callitrichidae.

Geoffroy's spider monkey is the only monkey found in all seven Central American countries, and it is also found in Colombia, Ecuador and Mexico. Other species that have a widespread distribution throughout Central America are the mantled howler, which is found in five Central American countries, and the Panamanian white-faced capuchin (Cebus imitator), which is found in four Central American countries. The Coiba Island howler, the black-headed spider monkey, the Panamanian night monkey (Aotus zonalis), the Colombian white-faced capuchin (Cebus capucinus) and Geoffroy's tamarin (Saguinus geoffroyi) are each found in only one Central American country, Panama. The Central American squirrel monkey (Saimiri oerstedii) also has a restricted distribution, living only on part of the Pacific coast of Costa Rica and a small portion of Panama. El Salvador is the Central American country with the fewest monkey species, as only Geoffroy's spider monkey lives there. Panama has the most species, nine, as the only Central American monkey species that does not include Panama within its range is the Yucatán black howler (Alouatta pigra).

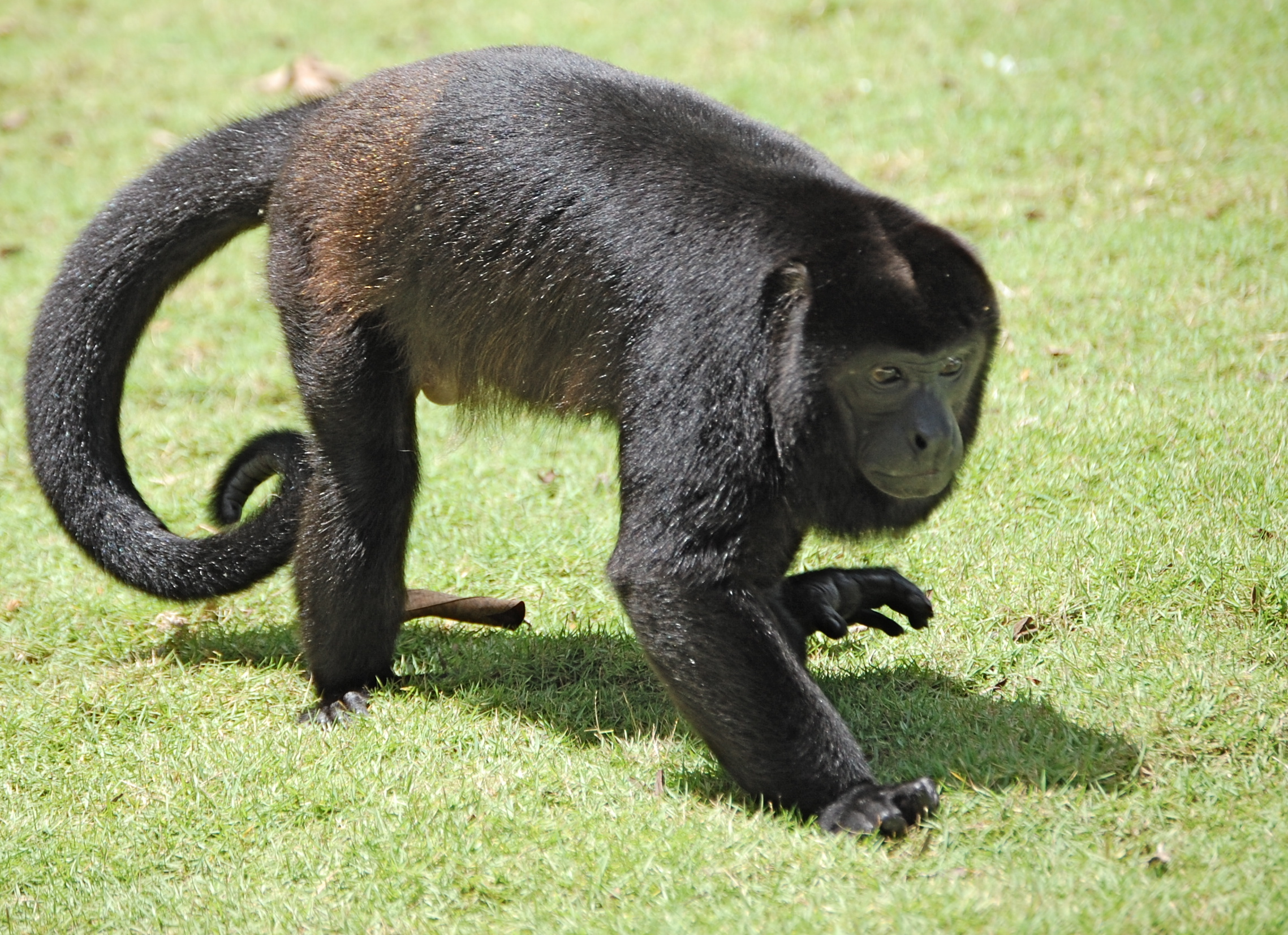
The mantled howler (Alouatta palliata) has widespread distribution within Central America.

Geoffroy's tamarin is the smallest Central American monkey, with an average size of about 0.5 kilograms (1.1 lb). The Central American squirrel monkey and Panamanian night monkey are almost as small, with average sizes of less than 1.0 kilogram (2.2 lb). The Yucatán black howler has the largest males, which average over 11 kilograms (24 lb). The spider monkey species have the next largest males, which average over 8 kilograms (18 lb).

One Central American monkey, the black-headed spider monkey, is considered to be critically endangered by the International Union for Conservation of Nature (IUCN). Geoffroy's spider monkey and the Yucatán black howler are both considered to be endangered. The Central American squirrel monkey had been considered endangered, but its conservation status was upgraded to vulnerable in 2008. The Coiba Island howler is also considered to be vulnerable. The white-faced capuchins, the mantled howler and Geoffroy's tamarin are all considered to be of least concern from a conservation standpoint.

Monkey watching is a popular tourist activity in parts of Central America. In Costa Rica, popular areas to view monkeys include Corcovado National Park, Manuel Antonio National Park, Santa Rosa National Park Guanacaste National Park and Lomas de Barbudal Biological Reserve. Corcovado National Park is the only park in Costa Rica in which all the country's four monkey species can be seen. The more accessible Manuel Antonio National Park is the only other park in Costa Rica in which the Central American squirrel monkey is found, and the Panamanian white-faced capuchin and mantled howler are also commonly seen there. Within Panama, areas to view monkeys include Darién National Park, Soberanía National Park and a number of islands on Gatun Lake including Barro Colorado Island. In addition, Geoffroy's tamarin can be seen in Metropolitan Natural Park within Panama City. In Belize, the easily explored Community Baboon Sanctuary was established specifically for the preservation of the Yucatán black howler and now contains more than 1000 monkeys.

== Key ==
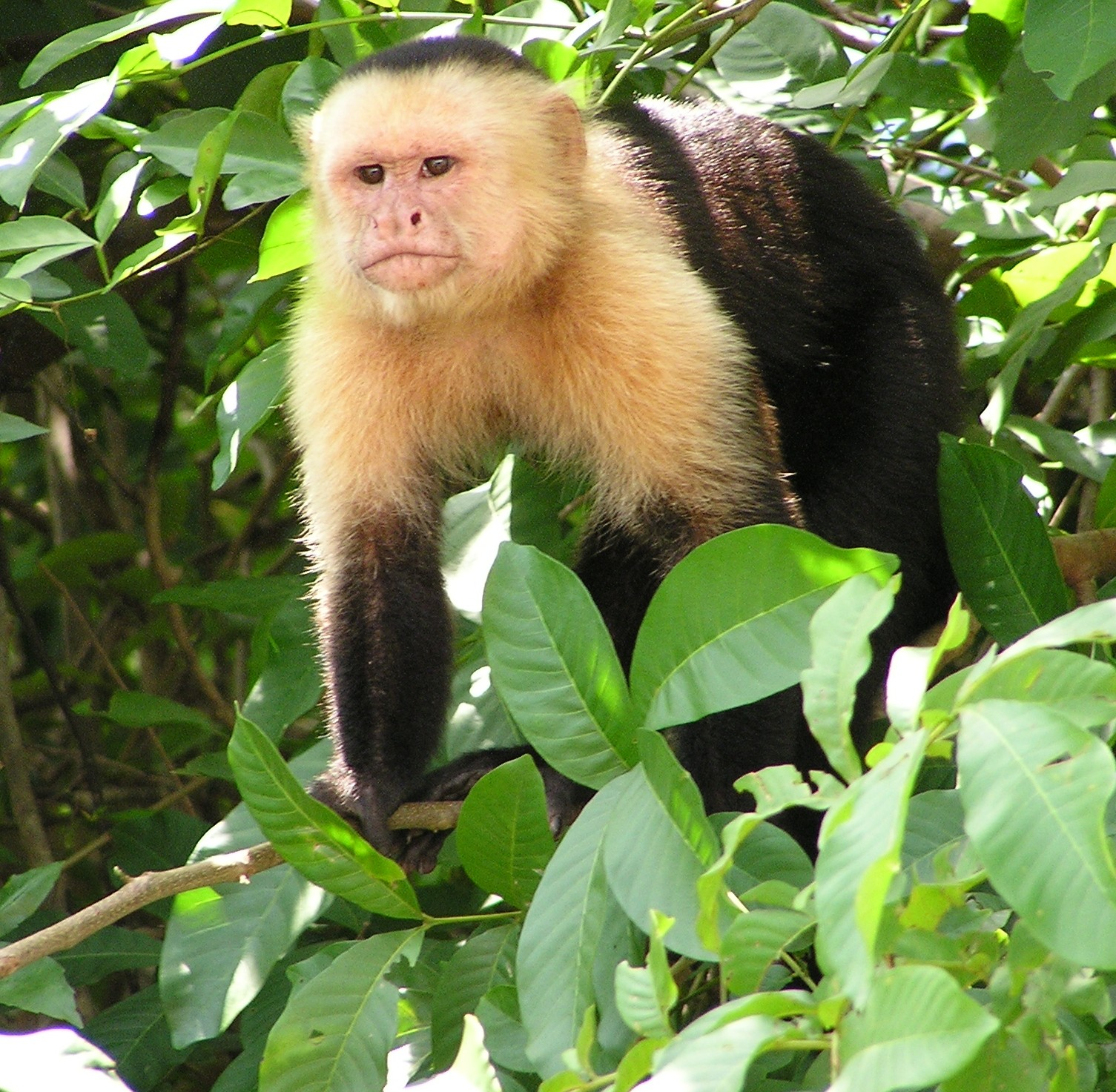
The Panamanian white-faced capuchin is found in four Central American countries.

Latin name	Latin binomial name, or scientific name, of the species
Common name	Common name of the species, per Wilson, et al. Mammal Species of the World (2005)
Family	Family within New World monkeys to which the species belongs
Average size - male	Average size of adult male members of the species, in kilograms and pounds
Average size - female	Average size of adult female members of the species, in kilograms and pounds
Conservation status	Conservation status of the species, per IUCN as of 2010
Range	Countries in which the species occurs; countries outside Central America shown in italics

== Species ==
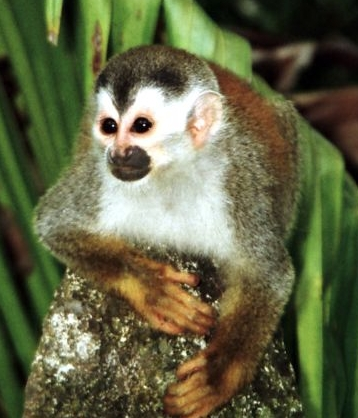
The Central American squirrel monkey is restricted to a limited range within Costa Rica and Panama.

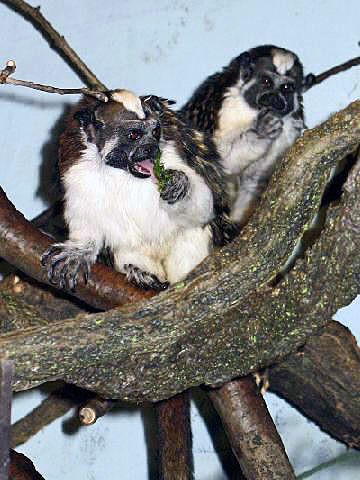
Geoffroy's tamarin (Saguinus geoffroyi) is the smallest Central American monkey.

Latin name	Common name	Family	Average size - male	Average size - female	Conservation status	Range	References
Alouatta coibensis^{[a]}	Coiba Island howler	Atelidae	7.150 kg (15.76 lb)	5.350 kg (11.79 lb)	Vulnerable	Panama	
Alouatta palliata	Mantled howler	Atelidae	7.150 kg (15.76 lb)	5.350 kg (11.79 lb)	Least concern	Costa Rica, Guatemala, Honduras, Nicaragua, Panama, Colombia, Ecuador, Mexico	
Alouatta pigra	Yucatán black howler	Atelidae	11.352 kg (25.03 lb)	6.434 kg (14.18 lb)	Endangered	Belize, Guatemala, Mexico	
Aotus zonalis^{[b]}	Panamanian night monkey	Aotidae	0.889 kg (1.96 lb)	0.916 kg (2.02 lb)	Data deficient	Panama, Colombia	
Ateles fusciceps^{[c]}	Black-headed spider monkey	Atelidae	8.890 kg (19.60 lb)	8.800 kg (19.40 lb)	Critically endangered	Panama, Colombia, Ecuador	
Ateles geoffroyi	Geoffroy's spider monkey	Atelidae	8.210 kg (18.10 lb)	7.700 kg (16.98 lb)	Endangered	Belize, Costa Rica, El Salvador, Guatemala, Honduras, Nicaragua, Panama, Colombia, Mexico	
Cebus capucinus^{[d]}	Colombian white-faced capuchin	Cebidae	3.668 kg (8.09 lb)	2.666 kg (5.88 lb)	Least concern	Panama, Colombia, Ecuador	
Cebus imitator	Panamanian white-faced capuchin	Cebidae	3.668 kg (8.09 lb)	2.666 kg (5.88 lb)	Least concern	Costa Rica, Honduras, Nicaragua, Panama	
Saguinus geoffroyi	Geoffroy's tamarin	Callitrichidae	0.486 kg (1.07 lb)	0.507 kg (1.12 lb)	Least concern	Panama, Colombia	
Saimiri oerstedii	Central American squirrel monkey	Cebidae	0.829 kg (1.83 lb)	0.695 kg (1.53 lb)	Vulnerable	Costa Rica, Panama	

== Footnotes ==
- ^{a} Some authorities regard Alouatta coibensis as a subspecies of Alouatta palliata. Sizes given are for Alouatta palliata.
- ^{b} Some authorities regard Aotus zonalis as a subspecies of Aotus lemurinus, in which case its trinomial name is Aotus lemurinus zonalis.
- ^{c} Some authorities regard Ateles fusciceps as a subspecies of Ateles geoffroyi.
- ^{d} Formerly regarded to be conspecific with Cebus imitator. Sizes given are for Cebus imitator.

== See also ==
- Lists of mammals by region
