= Hernández-Camacho's night monkey =

Conservation status
- Data Deficient (IUCN 3.1)

Scientific classification
- Kingdom: Animalia
- Phylum: Chordata
- Class: Mammalia
- Infraclass: Placentalia
- Order: Primates
- Family: Aotidae
- Genus: Aotus
- Species: A. jorgehernandezi

Binomial name
- Aotus jorgehernandezi Defler and Bueno, 2007
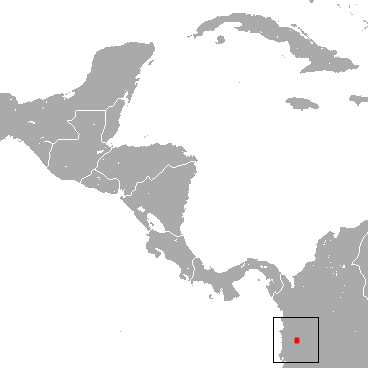
- Hernandez-Camacho's Night Monkey range

Species of New World monkey

Hernández-Camacho's night monkey (Aotus jorgehernandezi) is a species of night monkey of the family Aotidae. It was first described in 2007 by Thomas Defler and Marta Bueno. It has a gray neck and a white patch over each eye, separated by a black band. The fur on the chest, belly, lower arms and lower wrists is thick and white. It differs from other gray-necked night monkey species other than Brumback's night monkey in having 50 chromosomes.

It is believed to live in Colombia on the western slopes and foothills of the Andes, between Quindío and Risaralda. It is possible that it occurs in Tatamá National Natural Park. This range is currently also considered part of the range of the Panamanian night monkey. The Latin name honors the late Colombian biologist Jorge Hernández-Camacho.
