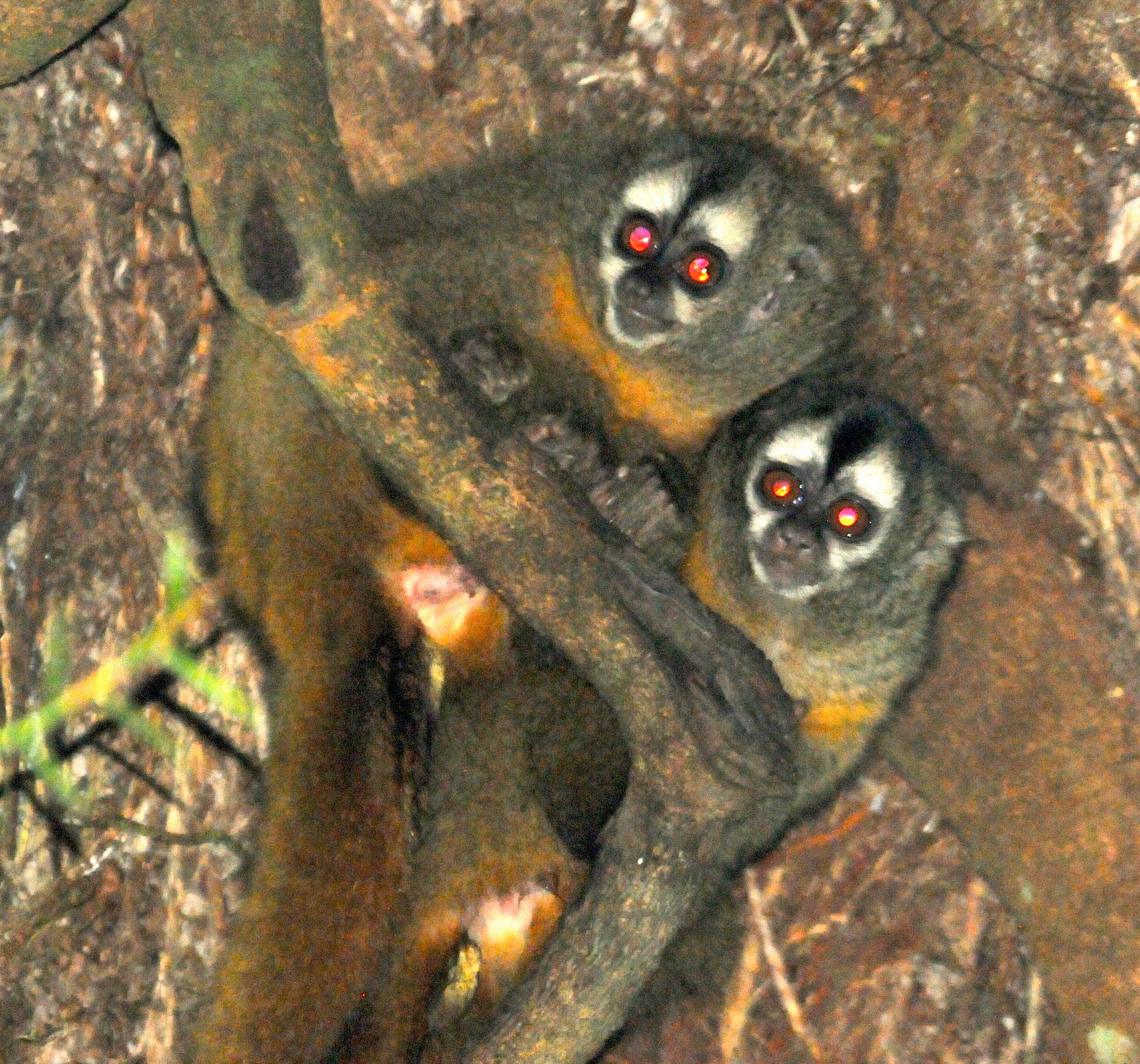

Conservation status
- Endangered (IUCN 3.1)

Scientific classification
- Kingdom: Animalia
- Phylum: Chordata
- Class: Mammalia
- Infraclass: Placentalia
- Order: Primates
- Family: Aotidae
- Genus: Aotus
- Species: A. miconax

Binomial name
- Aotus miconax Thomas, 1927
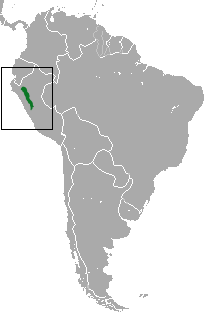
- Peruvian night monkey range

= Peruvian night monkey =

Species of New World monkey

The Peruvian night monkey (Aotus miconax), also known as the Andean night monkey, is a nocturnal New World monkey endemic to northern Peru. Adults weigh around 1 kg (2.2 lb) and measure up to 50 cm (20 in) in length. Its colour is grey to light brown with characteristic black and white markings on the face. The chest, belly and upper arms are orange tinged, however, to a lesser extent then Aotus nigriceps.

The species is one of the least known and possibly rarest Neotropical primates. This species is listed as endangered by the IUCN and under Peruvian law.

The Peruvian night monkey is also one of the least studied of all primates. The only data that exists about this species are museum specimens, sighting records and very basic ecological information. The species is thought to inhabit areas of cloud forest at 900–2,800 m (3,000–9,200 ft) above sea level in the departments of Amazonas, Huanuco and San Martin, and in border regions of neighboring departments.

== Behavior ==
The species is monogamous and lives in small family groups of 2 to 6 individuals similar to that of other Aotus species. Hardly any data exists on the dietary requirements of A. miconax, but it is known that it is generally frugivorous but also consumes leaf buds and insects. This species has been observed in primary and secondary forest, from large areas of contiguous forest to small forest patches.

== Threats and conservation ==
The main threat facing the Peruvian night monkey is the continued growth of human populations and associated habitat destruction. Hunting is a lesser threat to this species, but it is still hunted for the pet trade and by trophy hunters.

Neotropical Primate Conservation with funding from Primate Conservation Inc. is currently running a conservation based study on the species in La Esperanza, Amazonas. A network of community run reserves is intended to help conserving the species as well as the sympatric, Critically Endangered yellow-tailed woolly monkey.
