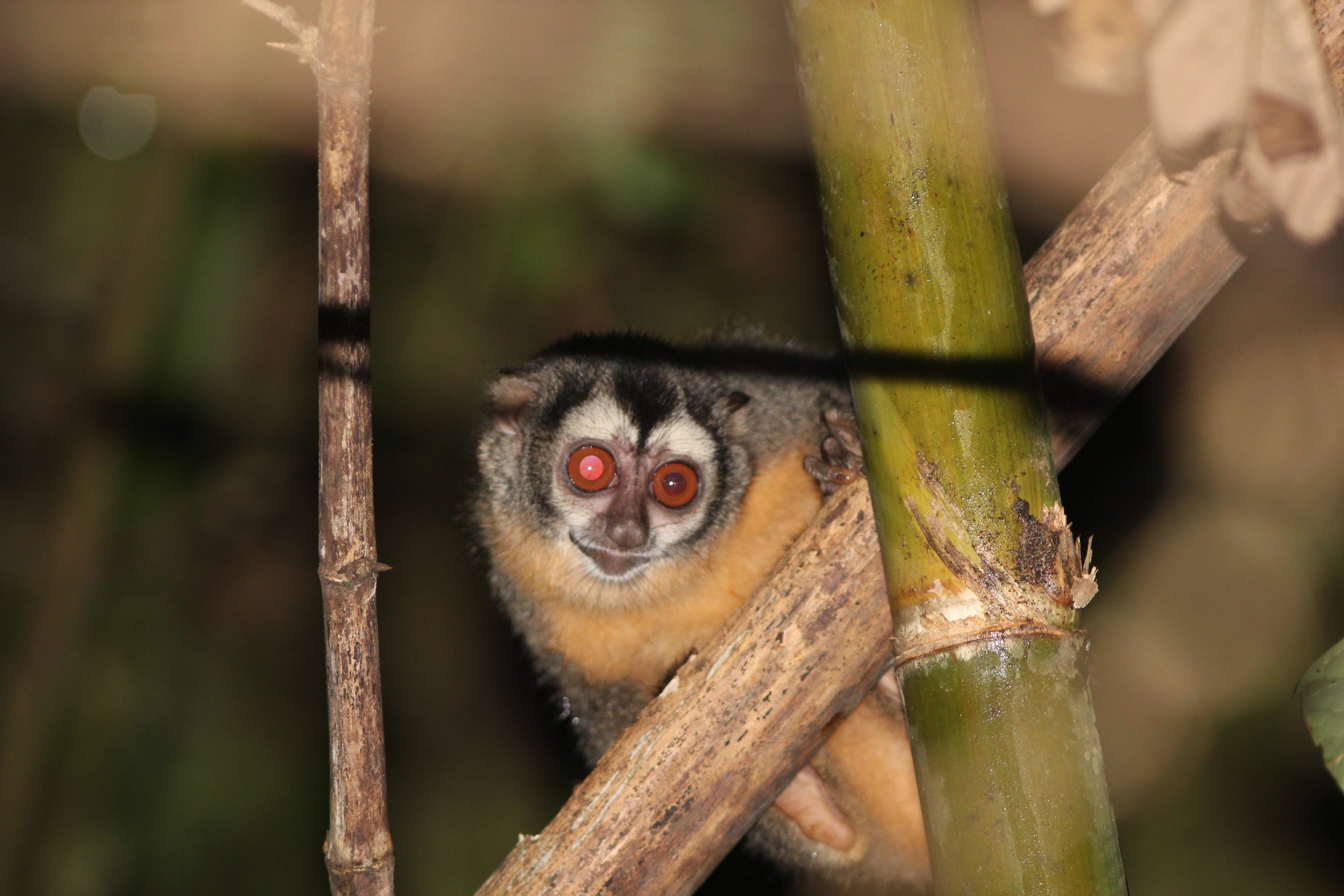
- Azara's night monkey (A. a. infulatus) at Cristalino Jungle Lodge, Mato Grosso, Brazil

Conservation status
- Least Concern (IUCN 3.1)

Scientific classification
- Kingdom: Animalia
- Phylum: Chordata
- Class: Mammalia
- Infraclass: Placentalia
- Order: Primates
- Family: Aotidae
- Genus: Aotus
- Species: A. azarae

Binomial name
- Aotus azarae (Humboldt, 1811)
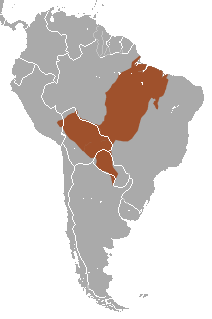
- Azara's night monkey range

Audio
- Calls recorded in Madre de Dios, Peru

= Azara's night monkey =

Species of New World monkey

Azara's night monkey (Aotus azarae), also known as the Azara's owl monkey, the southern night monkey, or the mirikiná, is a night monkey species from South America. It is found in Argentina, Bolivia, Brazil, Peru and Paraguay. The species is monogamous, with males providing a large amount of parental care. It is named after Spanish naturalist Félix de Azara. Although primarily nocturnal, some populations of Azara's night monkey are unique among night monkeys in being cathemeral: active at both day and night. The species is listed as Least Concern on the IUCN Red List.

== Taxonomy ==
There are three subspecies of Azara's night monkey.

- Aotus azarae azarae
- Bolivian night monkey, Aotus azarae boliviensis
- Feline night monkey, Aotus azarae infulatus

== Physical characteristics ==
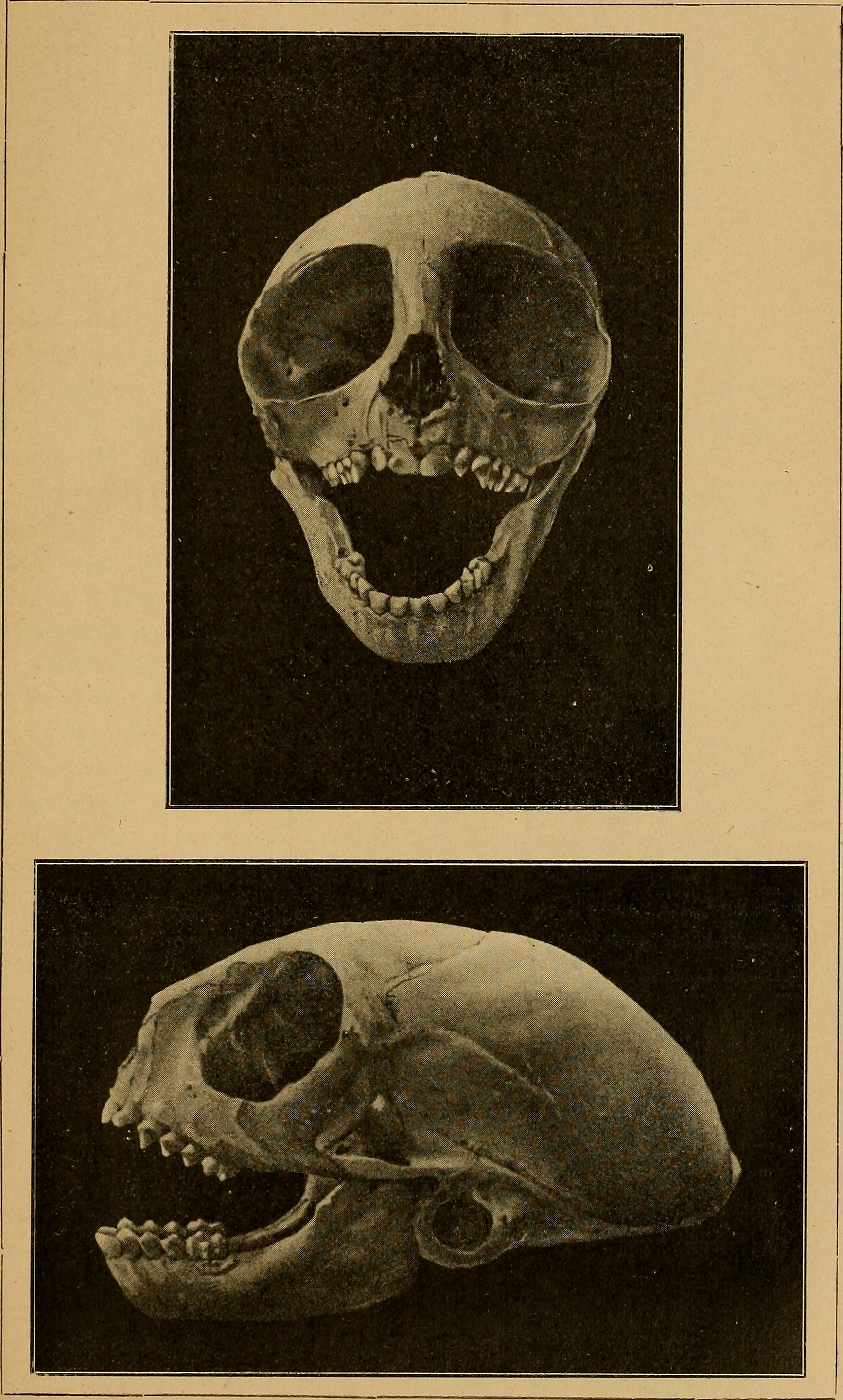
A. azarae.

The average weight is 1,290 g (2.84 lb) for male A. a. azarae and 1,310 g (2.89 lb) for female A. a. azarae. The mean body weight in A. a. azarae has increased by about 50 g (0.11 lb) in the past two decades. The increase is potentially linked to climate change, as warmer temperatures during the first year of life associate with higher body weights later in life.

For A. a. boliviensis, the mean weight is 1,180 g (2.60 lb) for males and 1,230 g (2.71 lb) for females. The average head and body length of the female is 341 mm (13.4 in) while the male is 346 mm (13.6 in). Its gestation period is about 133 days. The lifespan for Azara's night monkey is unknown, but the captive life span for members of the genus Aotus is believed to be 20 years.

== Behavior and ecology ==
Azara's night monkey is assigned to the genus Aotus which is the only nocturnal genus of monkeys. However, uniquely among night monkeys, populations of Azara's night monkey from the Gran Chaco are active both day and night. Azara's night monkey can be found sleeping in groups of between 2 and 5 in trees. The average group size is about 3 monkeys, consisting of an adult pair and their offspring. It leaps from tree to tree but also moves quadrupedally throughout the forest. It spends its life in trees and becomes more active when the moon is brighter, tending to keep to its well-known paths.

=== Diet ===
Azara's night monkey is primarily a frugivore, but also will eat leaves, flowers, insects and other small invertebrates, and some small vertebrates. Leaves and flowers are a secondary food choice to fruits and is more typically consumed during the dry season as access to fruits become more scarce. Fruits consumed by this species are of the fig, guava, and nettle families as well as some cultivated species for monkeys living closer to urban areas. Examples of prey consumed by Azara's night monkeys are grasshoppers, moths, millipedes, and sometimes bird eggs or small animals. The hunting of insects occurs at dawn and dusk and is typically done by grabbing the insects midair rather than searching in crevices. As it is a nocturnal species, there is greatly reduced competition from diurnal animals.

=== Social structure ===
Azara's night monkey is typical for monogamous animals and forms stable breeding bonds as it is genetically monogamous. It is a pair-bonded species and groups consist of one male, one female, and their young. These groups are typically made up of an adult male, an adult female, one infant, one to two juveniles and sometimes a sub adult if that offspring has not yet dispersed. It is strictly monogamous and no outside paternities have been found. Male care is especially important in this species and plays a role in its genetic monogamy. Food-sharing has been observed between pairs; a rare behavior in primate species. There is very little sexual dimorphism in this species.

==== Pair bonding ====
Azara's night monkey will remain with its pair bonded partner typically until the other passes or is replaced by an intruder. The median duration for this bond is 9 years. It typically will only have 1-2 partners over its lifetime. While in a pair bond, it reproduces yearly. However, if a partner passes or is replaced there is a 1 year gap in reproduction. Both males and females are hostile to outsiders due to their monogamous nature.

==== Paternal care for infants ====
Male Azara's night monkeys are an important source of infant care. Males begin to carry infants when the infants reach 2 weeks old and have been found to carry them more often than the females. Males are also more likely to play and share food with infants and are less likely to reject infants contact with them. Both parents are equally as likely to groom infants however, infants are likely to run to males when faced with danger. Paternity does not seem to matter for male Azara's night monkeys. When outside males fill vacancies if a partner passes or he drives the last male out, the new male will still provide care. This leads to little or no affect on young whose father has been replaced as care stays consistent.

=== Communication ===
Azara's night monkey has been found to communicate using auditory and olfactory senses. The most common auditory communications observed are hoots, whoops, and trills from young monkeys. Hoots are typically used for long distance calls while whoops are used in the event of conflict. Trills are typically used as a distress call for infants and juveniles. Scent marking is used for communication both from urine and scent glands it has in the base of its tail. Sniffing is typically used when greeting other Azara's night monkeys and is either a sniff of the other's nose or the base of its tail.

== Habitat and distribution ==
Azara's night monkey is found in northern Argentina, Bolivia, central Brazil, Paraguay and far southeastern Peru. Its range includes the southern Amazon, ranging into more open habitats such as the Gran Chaco. Aotus a. azarae is found in gallery forest and semi-deciduous forest, A. a. infulatus is found in humid lowland forest and gallery forest, and A. a. infulatus is found in various forest types. The last has been recorded as high as 1,250 m (4,100 ft) in the Andean foothills.

== Predation ==
Predators of Azara's night monkeys in Bolivia include crowned solitary eagles.

== Conservation ==
Azara's night monkey is widespread and believed to be overall fairly common. It is present in several reserves. The species is not considered threatened, but is declining locally due to habitat loss.
