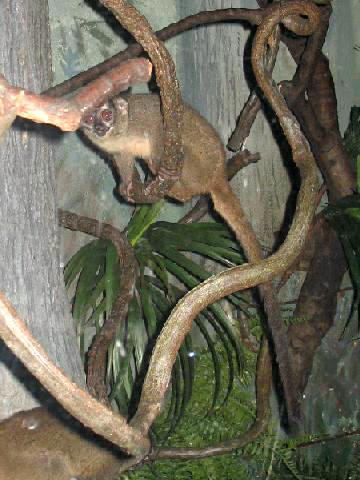

Conservation status
- Least Concern (IUCN 3.1)

Scientific classification
- Kingdom: Animalia
- Phylum: Chordata
- Class: Mammalia
- Infraclass: Placentalia
- Order: Primates
- Family: Aotidae
- Genus: Aotus
- Species: A. trivirgatus

Binomial name
- Aotus trivirgatus (Humboldt, 1811)
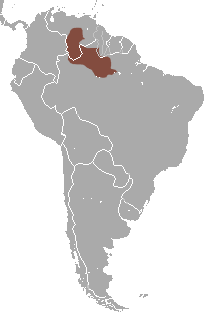
- Three-striped night monkey range

= Three-striped night monkey =

Species of New World monkey

The three-striped night monkey (Aotus trivirgatus), also known as northern night monkey or northern owl monkey, is one of several species of owl monkeys currently recognised. It is found in Venezuela and north-central Brazil.

Until 1983, all the owl monkeys were regarded as subspecies of Aotus trivirgatus, and all were referred to as douroucoulis. The use of the name douroucouli exclusively for the three-striped night monkey is not universally accepted; some authors use it for the entire genus, or for the grey-necked group of species within it (to which A. trivirgatus belongs).

Like other owl monkeys, the three-striped night monkey lives in woodlands including rain forest. It is mainly black, with striking white markings on its face. Its body size is 27–48 cm, and its tail is about the same length again. Adults weigh up to 1 kg. It has very large eyes, and is most active on moonlit nights, feeding on fruit, nuts, leaves, insects and other small invertebrates, and birds' eggs.

The three-striped night monkey forms pair bonds which are broken only by the death of one partner. It lives in family groups, with the immature young staying with their parents until sexual maturity at the age of 3 or 4. Normally only one infant is born, after a gestation period of a little over 4 months.

== Predation ==
Predators of three-striped night monkeys include rainbow boas.
