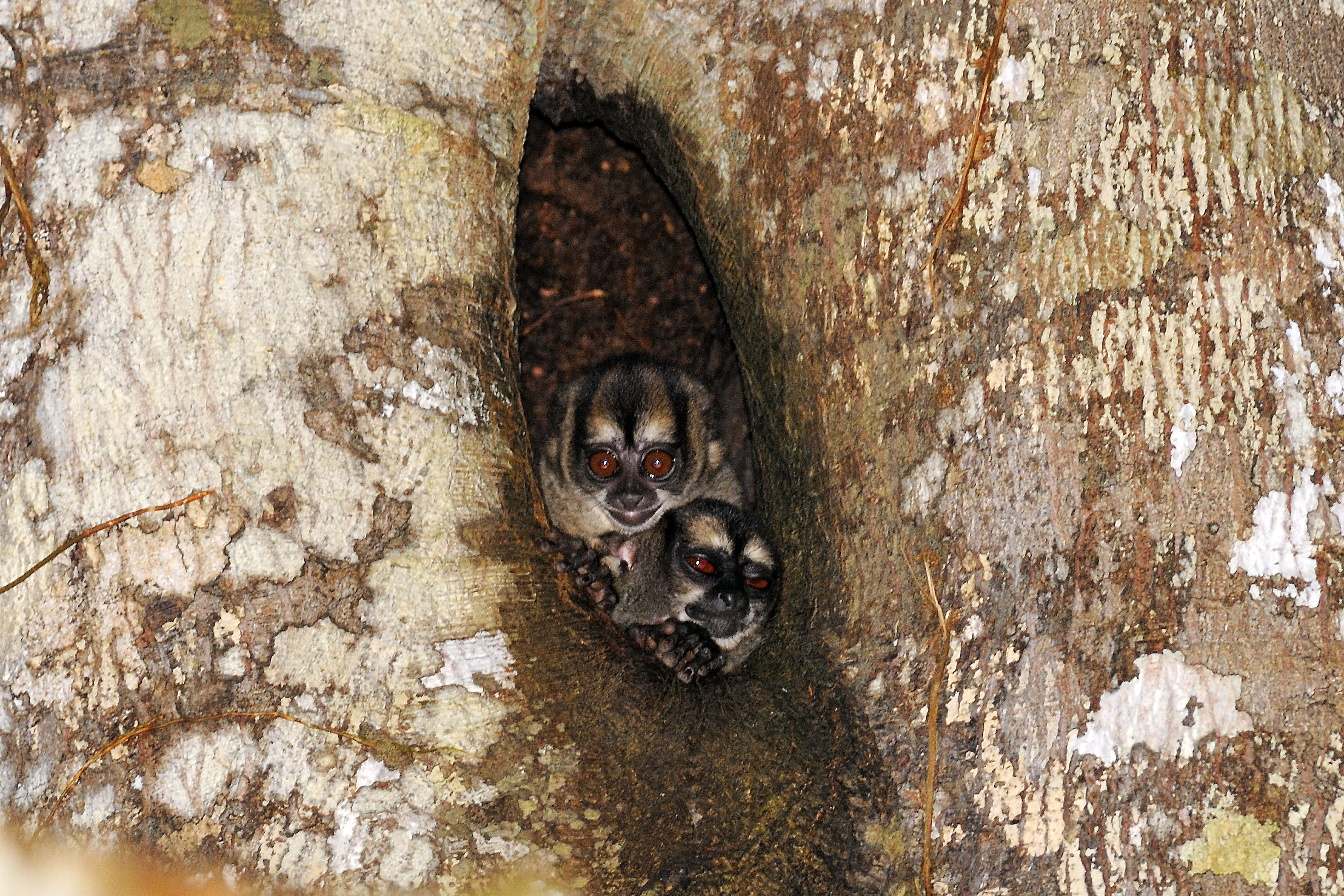

Conservation status
- Least Concern (IUCN 3.1)

Scientific classification
- Kingdom: Animalia
- Phylum: Chordata
- Class: Mammalia
- Infraclass: Placentalia
- Order: Primates
- Family: Aotidae
- Genus: Aotus
- Species: A. vociferans

Binomial name
- Aotus vociferans (Spix, 1823)
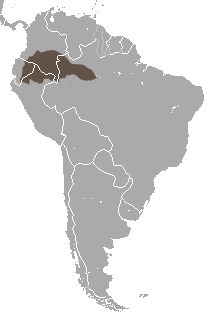
- Spix's Night Monkey range

= Spix's night monkey =

Species of New World monkey

Spix's night monkey (Aotus vociferans), also known as the Colombian gray night monkey, noisy night monkey and Spix's owl monkey, is a night monkey species from South America. It is found in Brazil, Colombia, Ecuador and Peru.

The Spix's night monkey is a small bodied monkey species usually having a mass of around one kilogram. It belongs to the only nocturnal genus of New World primates, Aotus. This type of monkey can leap farther than most due to it having longer arms than legs. The monkey averages 0.5 meters in height. The night monkey is considered to be a new world monkey.

The social behavior of the Aotus vociferans is group based. These groups usually consist of breeding pairs and their offspring. This species has a monogamous mating system. After the offspring are born, the father becomes the main caretaker, only giving up the offspring for them to suckle. The offspring will usually stay with their birth group until they reach two and a half to three and a half years old. An exception to this if the male breeding partner is no longer present for any reason (usually only caused by death), then the offspring may stay with its birth group for only twelve weeks to the normal departure age. Social grooming in this species of monkey is uncommon.

The Aotus vociferans reproduce usually by giving birth to one offspring. Although, like with humans, there are cases of twins. The female breeding partner carries the offspring in interbirth for around one year. Both mating and birthing occur between November and January. For this species, copulation attempts tend to be short and quick, starting with the male and female approaching one another. Then the male performs a social sniff. During the original sniff, the female may reciprocate but not always. Sexual intercourse usually consists of only three to four thrusts by the male with him ejaculating on the final thrust.

This species moves through the forest by swinging between horizontal branches and uses all four limbs to grab branches. They may also leap from tree to tree.

This species communicates through voice, sight, smell, and touch. Vocally, this monkey has different sounds for different situations. To startle a potential predator the night monkey will "scream," emitting a high pitched shriek. These monkeys use social sniffing to assess potential breeding partners. They will also urinate on their hands and then rub it on different surfaces to show sexual attraction. Aggressive males will usually arch their backs with all of their limbs straightened. When in the presence of a predator the night monkey will sway from side to side to try and deter the predator. A rejection bite is used as tactile communication between mother and offspring after suckling or after around one week old when contact is not welcome. Father and offspring also use a rejection bite when the offspring reaches around 8 weeks when contact is not welcome.
