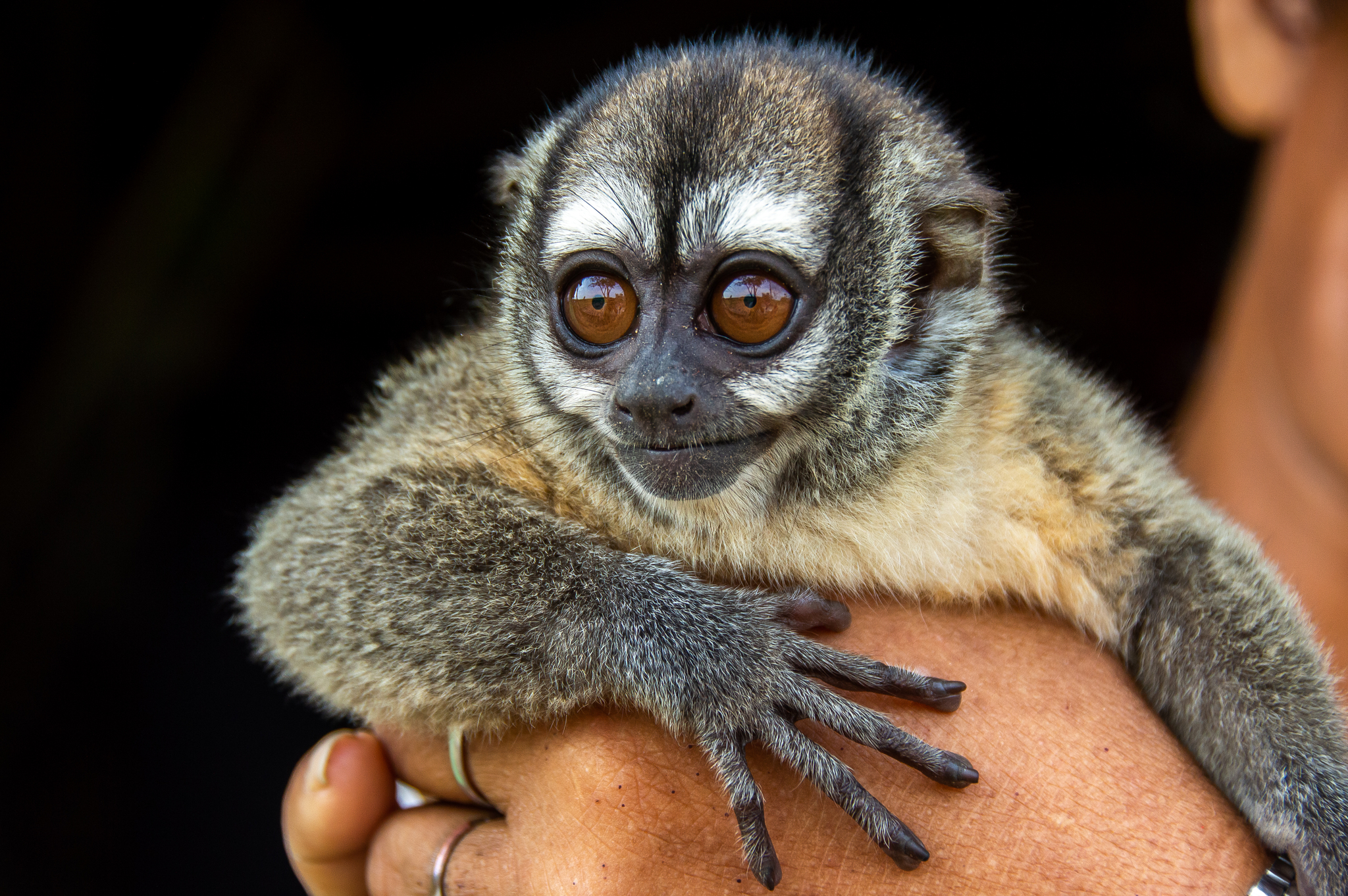

Conservation status
- Vulnerable (IUCN 3.1)

Scientific classification
- Kingdom: Animalia
- Phylum: Chordata
- Class: Mammalia
- Infraclass: Placentalia
- Order: Primates
- Family: Aotidae
- Genus: Aotus
- Species: A. nancymaae

Binomial name
- Aotus nancymaae Hershkovitz, 1983
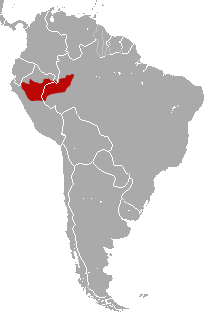
- Nancy Ma's night monkey range

= Nancy Ma's night monkey =

Species of New World monkey

Nancy Ma's night monkey (Aotus nancymaae) is a night monkey species from South America. It is found in Brazil and Peru. The species is named after Dr. Nancy Shui-Fong Ma.

It is known in medical research as a model organism for studying the Duffy antigen. Nancy Ma's night monkeys have also been found to have an evolutionary pattern change in the hormone oxytocin. It was believed that all placental mammals had the same OXT amino acid chain until the discovery of a change in this New World monkey and others.

== Predation ==
Large, arboreal snakes may be primary predators of Nancy Ma’s night monkeys.
