= Thomas Defler =

Thomas R. Defler (born 26 November 1941; Denver, Colorado) is a North American primatologist who lives and works in Colombia.

Defler earned his PhD from the University of Colorado at Denver in 1976 and then moved to Colombia. He worked in eastern Colombia in the Llanos until 1984. Defler then worked in the Amazonian Vaupés Department where he developed and lived in his research station, Estación Biológica Caparú until 1998. In 1998, he was obligated to flee from his research station by FARC guerrillas. He had run a primate rehabilitation center in Vaupes. He is the author of several papers about primates and of the books Primates de Colombia (2003), Primates of Colombia (2004) and Historia Natural de los Primates Colombianos (2010). He edited a monograph on woolly monkeys as well.

Currently, he heads another Amazonian research station that he has developed in the southern Colombian Amazon, Estación Ecológica Omé, that is affiliated with the National University of Colombia and he teaches at the Bogotá campus of the same university. He and the Colombian biologist Marta Bueno are credited with first describing Hernández-Camacho's night monkey (Aotus jorgehernandezi) in 2007. Together with Javier Garcia, he led an expedition in which they discovered and described a new species of titi monkey, the Caquetá titi (Callicebus caquetensis). Using karyotypes, Defler has done work clarifying the taxonomy of various species of night monkey (Aotus). He has done field studies in the Colombian Llanos and the Colombian Amazon on the white-fronted capuchin (Cebus albifrons), the brown woolly monkey (Lagothrix lagothricha), the black-headed uakari (Cacajao melanocephalus), the black titi (Callicebus lugens), the Lucifer titi (Callicebus lucifer), and the Venezuelan red howler (Alouatta seniculus) and has accomplished many primate censuses in different parts of eastern Colombia.
