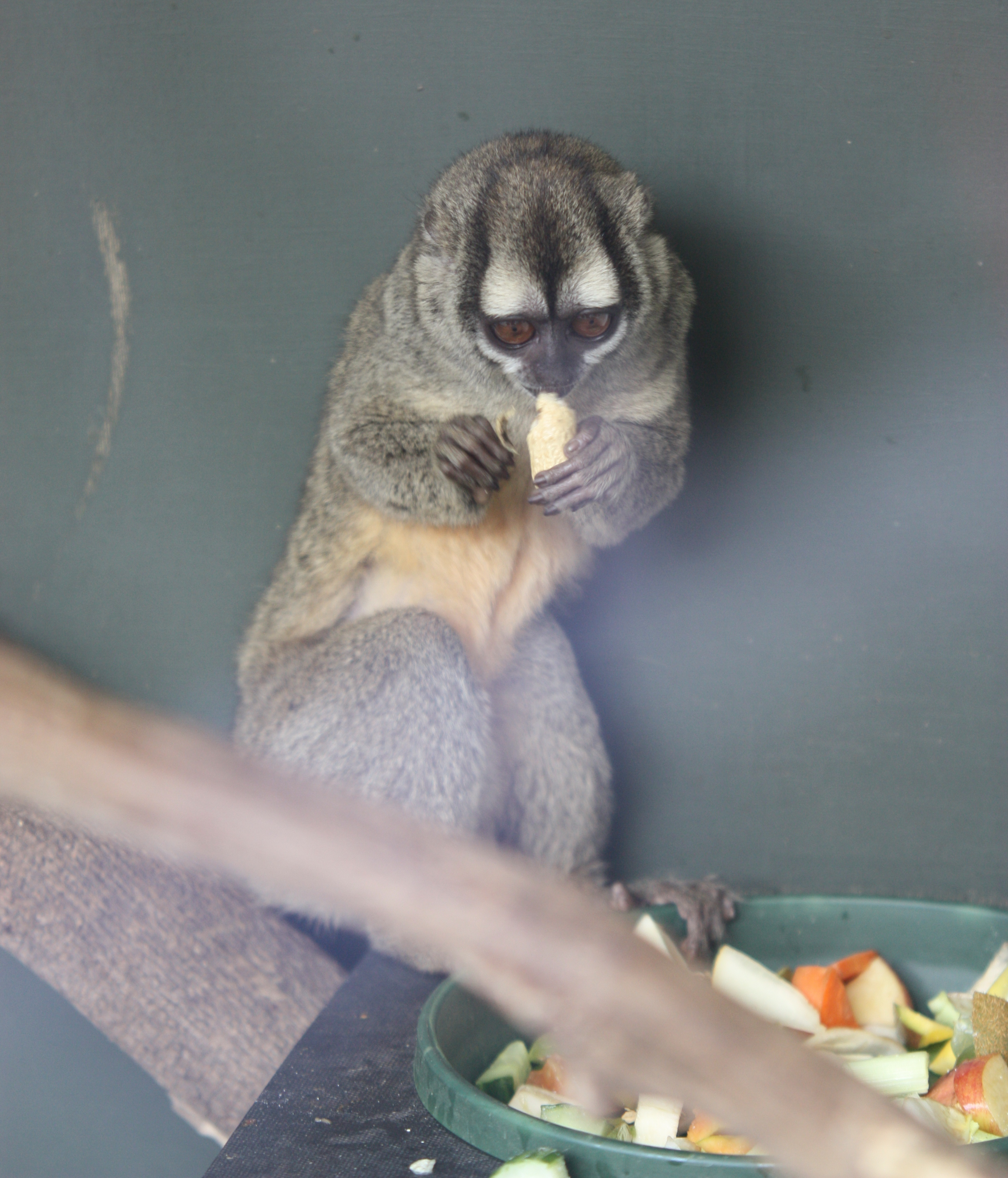
- At Marwell Wildlife, England

Conservation status
- Vulnerable (IUCN 3.1)

Scientific classification
- Kingdom: Animalia
- Phylum: Chordata
- Class: Mammalia
- Infraclass: Placentalia
- Order: Primates
- Family: Aotidae
- Genus: Aotus
- Species: A. griseimembra

Binomial name
- Aotus griseimembra Elliot, 1912
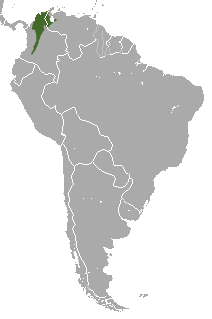
- Gray-handed Night Monkey range

= Gray-handed night monkey =

Species of New World monkey

The gray-handed night monkey (Aotus griseimembra) is a species of night monkey formerly considered a subspecies of Gray-bellied night monkey of the family Aotidae. Its range consists of parts of Colombia and Venezuela. The exact classification of the gray-handed night monkey is uncertain. While some authors consider it a subspecies of the gray-bellied night monkey, A. lemurinus, other authors consider it a separate species, A. griseimembra.

In Colombia, its range consists of the northern portion from the Sinú River (or perhaps further east) to the Venezuelan border, including the Sierra Nevada de Santa Marta and the Magdalena River, Cauca River and Sao Jorge River valleys. In Venezuela, it is found to the west and south of Maracaibo.

The gray-handed night monkey is a relatively small monkey, with males weighing approximately 1,009 grams (35.6 oz) and females weighing about 923 grams (32.6 oz). It has short, tight fur. The fur on the back ranges from grayish brown to reddish brown. The belly is yellowish. The hair on the back of the hands and feet is the color of light coffee with darker hair tips, a key distinguishing feature from other A. lemurinus subspecies.

The gray-handed night monkey is arboreal and nocturnal. It and the other members of the genus Aotus are the only nocturnal monkeys. Laboratory experiments indicated lower levels of activity even in lighting conditions consistent with a full moon. It is found in several types of forest, including secondary forest and coffee plantations, although one study indicated a preference for highly diverse forest. It lives in small groups of between two and six monkeys, most typically two to four, consisting of an adult pair and one infant and several juveniles and/or subadults. Groups are territorial, and groups occupy ranges that overlap only slightly. One study found a population density of 1.5 monkeys per square kilometer, while another found a density of 150 monkeys per square kilometer. The latter figure occurred in a forest remnant that had served as a refuge, which may account for the extremely high density.

In common with other night monkeys, the gray-handed night monkey is one of the few monogamous monkeys. The monogamous pair generally gives birth to a single infant each year, although twins occasionally occur. The gestation period is about 133 days. The father carries the infant from the time it is one or two days old, passing it to the mother for nursing. Average interbirth interval for the mother is 271 days.

The gray-handed night monkey is listed as "vulnerable" by the International Union for Conservation of Nature (IUCN). It is believed to be particularly threatened in Colombia. This is in part due to habitat loss, but also because many were captured in the 1960s and 1970s for malaria research.
