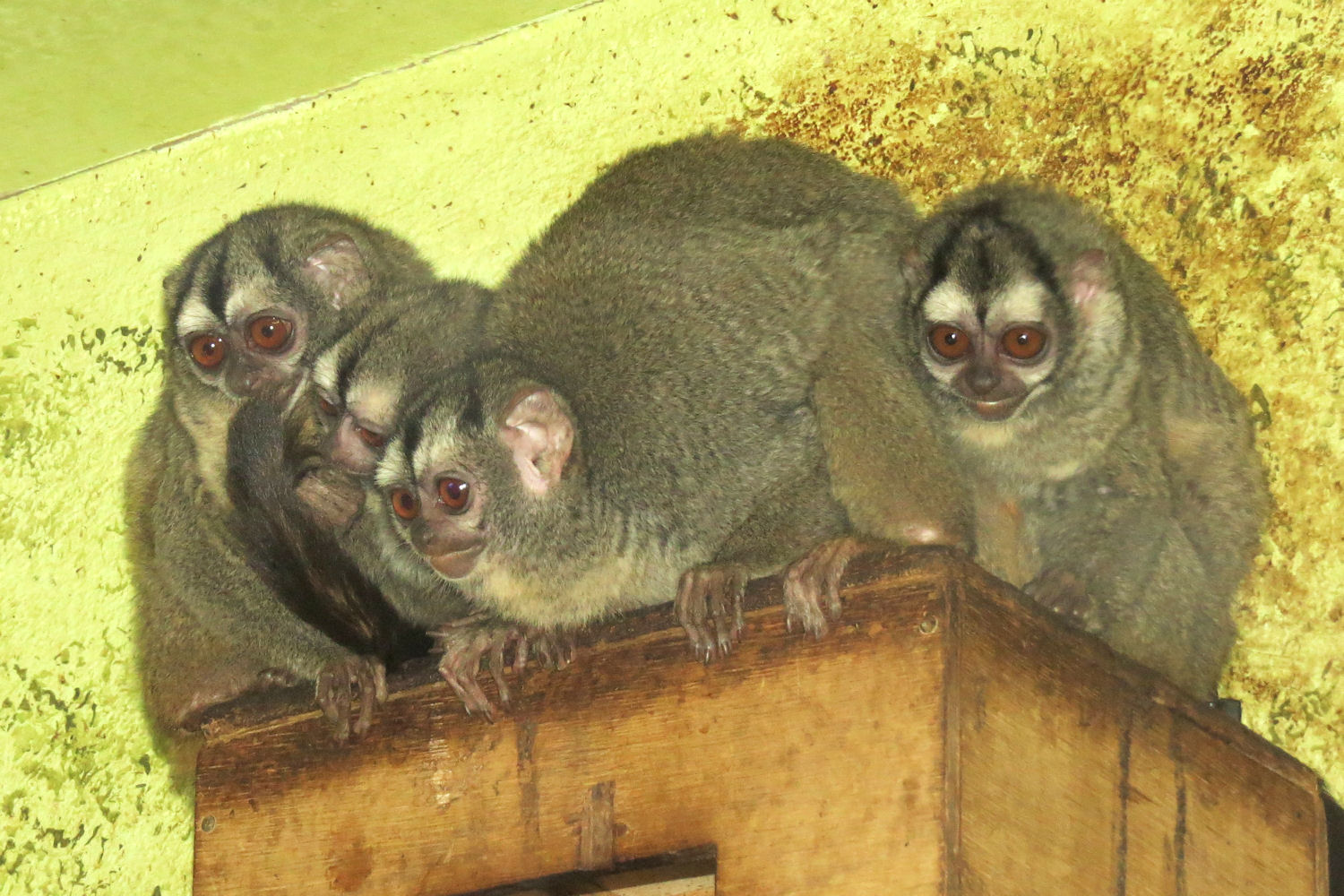

Conservation status
- Vulnerable (IUCN 3.1)

Scientific classification
- Kingdom: Animalia
- Phylum: Chordata
- Class: Mammalia
- Order: Primates
- Family: Aotidae
- Genus: Aotus
- Species: A. lemurinus

Binomial name
- Aotus lemurinus I. Geoffroy Saint-Hilaire, 1843
- Geographic range

Synonyms
- hershkovitzi Ramirez-Cerquera, 1983

= Gray-bellied night monkey =

Species of New World monkey

The gray-bellied night monkey (Aotus lemurinus), also called the grey-legged douroucouli or lemurine owl monkey, is a small New World monkey of the family Aotidae. Native to tropical and subtropical forests of South America, the gray-bellied night monkey faces a significant threat from hunting, harvesting for use in pharmaceutical research and habitat destruction.

== Taxonomy ==
There have been up to four subspecies of the gray-bellied night monkey. All but the nominate subspecies have been elevated to full species rank. The three species formally considered subspecies are:

- Brumback's night monkey, Aotus brumbacki
- Gray-handed night monkey, Aotus griseimembra
- Panamanian night monkey, Aotus zonalis

Additionally, Hershkovitz's night monkey Aotus hershkovitzi is now considered to be a junior synonym for A. lemurinus.

== Description ==
Like other members of their genus, this species is nocturnal; its small, round head is striped with black and is dominated by two large, brown eyes. The overall effect is not unlike an owl; the monkey's eyes shine a reddish orange by reflected light. Its white eyebrows are bushy, with a patch of darker fur between them. Its grey fur is described as dense and woolly, with the animal's underside being yellow to orange in colour. Its brownish black to orange tail is not prehensile and invariably tipped with black.

The gray-bellied night monkey has slender limbs with long, delicate fingers; its fingertip pads are wide. Adults may attain a weight of 1.3 kilograms; there is no sexual dimorphism observed.

== Habitat and diet ==
Found in both dry and moist areas, the gray-bellied night monkey occupies all levels of the forest canopy; however, it is seldom found on the ground. It prefers dense vegetation with tangles of vines where the trees are evenly dispersed. Its range is from Colombia to Venezuela, Ecuador and Panama; it is also found in the tropical Andes.

By day the monkey slumbers in the cavities of trees or in dense thickets; by night, it searches the canopy for a variety of food items. Primarily a frugivore (fruit-eating), this monkey also eats vegetation, insects, nectar, and even other small mammals and birds when fruit is scarce.

== Behaviour and reproduction ==
Most active during twilight hours and periods of bright moonlight, the gray-bellied night monkey troop consists of a mated pair and their offspring, up to five individuals in total. This species is noted for the monogamous pair-bond it forms; parental duties are shared between the lead pair and the juveniles. However, it is the male who assumes the bulk of care giving and rearing responsibilities; the female serves only to nurse the infants. Remarkably, even if the male dies the female will refuse to take over from him.

Characteristically vociferous, the monkey produces a range of calls: from soft clicks and low-pitched guttural rumblings to owl-like hoots and high-pitched shrieks when threatened. When not feeding, the monkey is typically inactive. Like other members of its genus, the gray-bellied night monkey claims a relatively small territory of about 0.1 km². Scent is central to this monkey's intraspecies communication; territories are marked with brown, oily secretions from the base of the tail.

Birthing peaks at the end of the dry season and in the midst of the wet season. Gestation averages 133 days, usually resulting in a single infant; twins are a rarity. There is only one litter per year. Sexual maturity is reached at 2.5 to 3.5 years of age, at which point the offspring disperse; that is, they leave the troop in search of an unattached mate.
