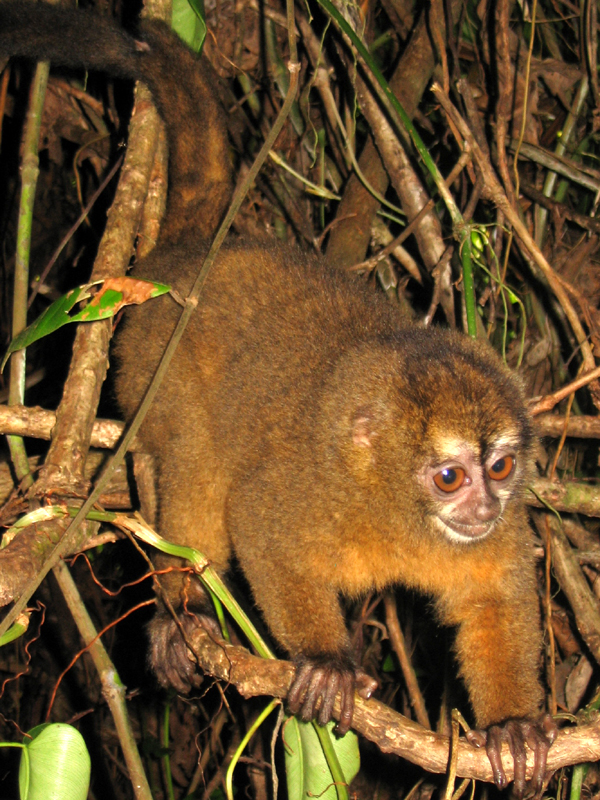
- A Panamanian night monkey in Panama Night monkey calls, recorded in Madre de Dios, Peru

Scientific classification
- Kingdom: Animalia
- Phylum: Chordata
- Class: Mammalia
- Order: Primates
- Infraorder: Simiiformes
- Parvorder: Platyrrhini
- Family: Aotidae; Poche, 1908 (1865)
- Genus: Aotus; Illiger, 1811

Type species
- Simia trivirgata Humboldt, 1811

Species
- see text
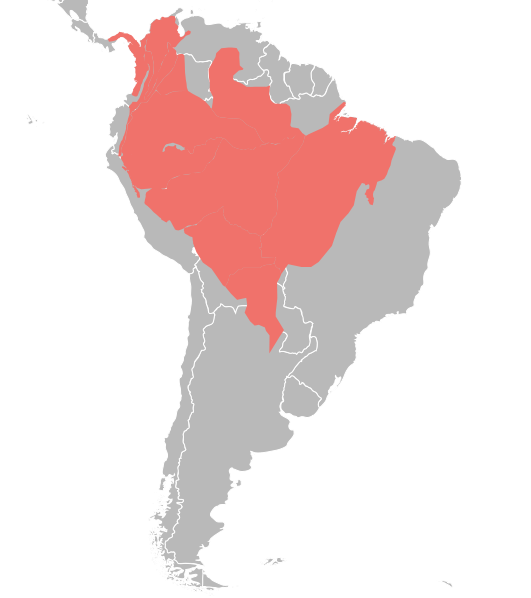
- Aotidae distribution

= Night monkey =

Night monkeys

Genus of New World monkeys

Night monkeys, also known as owl monkeys or douroucoulis (/duːruːˈkuːliz/), are nocturnal New World monkeys of the genus Aotus, the only living member of the family Aotidae (/eɪˈɒtɪdiː/). The genus comprises eleven species which are found across Panama and much of South America in primary and secondary forests, tropical rainforests and cloud forests up to 2,400 metres (7,900 ft). Night monkeys have large eyes which improve their vision at night, while their ears are mostly hidden, giving them their name Aotus, meaning "earless".

Night monkeys are the only truly nocturnal monkeys, although some cathemeral populations of Azara's night monkey have irregular bursts of activity during day and night. They have a varied repertoire of vocalisations and live in small family groups of a mated pair and their immature offspring. Night monkeys have monochromatic vision which improves their ability to detect visual cues at night.

Night monkeys are threatened by habitat loss, the pet trade, hunting for bushmeat, and by biomedical research. They constitute one of the few monkey species affected by the often deadly human malaria protozoan Plasmodium falciparum and are therefore used as experimental subjects in malaria research. The Peruvian night monkey is classified by the International Union for Conservation of Nature (IUCN) as an Endangered species, while four are Vulnerable species, four are Least-concern species, and two are data deficient.

== Taxonomy ==
Until 1983, all night monkeys were placed into only one (A. lemurinus) or two species (A. lemurinus and A. azarae). Chromosome variability showed that there was more than one species in the genus and Hershkovitz (1983) used morphological and karyological evidence to propose nine species, one of which is now recognised as a junior synonym. He split Aotus into two groups: a northern, gray-necked group (A. lemurinus, A. hershkovitzi, A. trivirgatus and A. vociferans) and a southern, red-necked group (A. miconax, A. nancymaae, A. nigriceps and A. azarae). Arguably, the taxa otherwise considered subspecies of A. lemurinus – brumbacki, griseimembra and zonalis – should be considered separate species, whereas A. hershkovitzi arguably is a junior synonym of A. lemurinus. A new species from the gray-necked group was recently described as A. jorgehernandezi. As is the case with some other splits in this genus, an essential part of the argument for recognizing this new species was differences in the chromosomes. Chromosome evidence has also been used as an argument for merging "species", as was the case for considering infulatus a subspecies of A. azarae rather than a separate species. Two extinct species of Aotidae are known from the fossil record: Aotus dindensis and Tremacebus harringtoni.

=== Classification ===
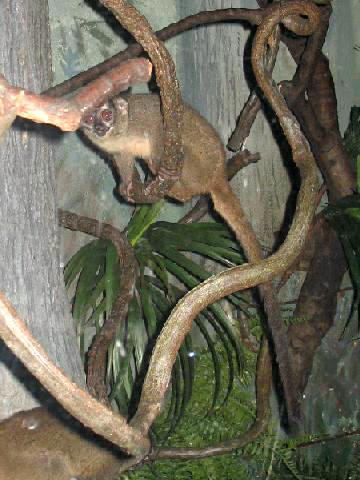
Three-striped night monkey

Family Aotidae

- Genus Aotus
  - Aotus lemurinus (gray-necked) group:
    - Gray-bellied night monkey, Aotus lemurinus
    - Panamanian night monkey, Aotus zonalis
    - Gray-handed night monkey, Aotus griseimembra
    - Hernández-Camacho's night monkey, Aotus jorgehernandezi
    - Brumback's night monkey, Aotus brumbacki
    - Three-striped night monkey, Aotus trivirgatus
    - Spix's night monkey, Aotus vociferans
  - Aotus azarae (red-necked) group:
    - Azara's night monkey, Aotus azarae
    - Peruvian night monkey, Aotus miconax
    - Nancy Ma's night monkey, Aotus nancymaae
    - Black-headed night monkey, Aotus nigriceps
  - Group Incertae sedis
    - †Aotus dindensis
- Genus †Tremacebus
  - †Tremacebus harringtoni

== Physical characteristics ==
Night monkeys have large brown eyes; the size improves their nocturnal vision increasing their ability to be active at night. They are sometimes said to lack a tapetum lucidum, the reflective layer behind the retina possessed by many nocturnal animals. Other sources say they have a tapetum lucidum composed of collagen fibrils. At any rate, night monkeys lack the tapetum lucidum composed of riboflavin crystals possessed by lemurs and other strepsirrhines, which is an indication that their nocturnality is a secondary adaption evolved from ancestrally diurnal primates.

Their ears are rather difficult to see; this is why their genus name, Aotus (meaning "earless") was chosen. There is little data on the weights of wild night monkeys. From the figures that have been collected, it appears that males and females are similar in weight; the heaviest species is Azara's night monkey at around 1,254 grams (2.765 lb), and the lightest is Brumback's night monkey, which weighs between 455 and 875 grams (1.003 and 1.929 lb). The male is slightly taller than the female, measuring 346 and 341 millimetres (13.6 and 13.4 in), respectively.

== Ecology ==
Night monkeys can be found in Panama, Colombia, Ecuador, Peru, Brazil, Paraguay, Argentina, Bolivia, and Venezuela. The species that live at higher elevations and colder latitudes tend to have thicker fur. Night monkeys can live in forests undisturbed by humans (primary forest) as well as in forests that are recovering from human logging efforts (secondary forest).

=== Distribution ===
A primary distinction between red-necked and gray-necked night monkeys is spatial distribution. Gray-necked night monkeys (Aotus lemurinus group) are found north of the Amazon River, while the red-necked group (Aotus azare group) are localized south of the Amazon River. Red-necked night monkeys are found throughout various regions of the Amazon rainforest of South America, with some variation occurring between the four species. Nancy Ma's night monkey occurs in both flooded and unflooded tropical rainforest regions of Peru, preferring moist swamp and mountainous areas. This species has been observed nesting in regions of the Andes and has recently been introduced to Colombia, likely as a result of post-research release into the community. The black-headed night monkey is also found mainly in the Peruvian Amazon (central and upper Amazon), however its range extends throughout Brazil and Bolivia to the base of the Andes mountain chain. Night monkeys such like the black-headed night monkey, generally inhabit cloud forests; areas with consistent presence of low clouds with a high mist and moisture content which allows for lush and rich vegetation to grow year round, providing excellent food and lodging sources. The Peruvian night monkey, like Nancy Ma's night monkey, is endemic to the Peruvian Andes however it is found at a higher elevation, approximately 800–2,400 metres (2,600–7,900 ft) above sea level and therefore exploits different niches of this habitat. The distribution of A. azare, extends further towards the Atlantic Ocean, spanning Argentina, Bolivia and the drier, south western regions of Paraguay, however unlike the other red-necked night monkey species, it is not endemic to Brazil.

=== Sleep sites ===
During the daylight hours, night monkeys rest in shaded tree areas. These species have been observed exploiting four different types of tree nests, monkeys will rest in; holes formed in the trunks of trees, in concave sections of branches surrounded by creepers and epiphytes, in dense areas of epiphyte, climber and vine growth and in areas of dense foliage. These sleeping sites provide protection from environmental stressors such as heavy rain, sunlight and heat. Sleeping sites are therefore carefully chosen based upon tree age, density of trees, availability of space for the group, ability of site to provide protection, ease of access to the site and availability of site with respect to daily routines. While night monkeys are an arboreal species, nests have not been observed in higher strata of the rainforest ecosystem, rather a higher density of nests were recorded at low-mid vegetation levels. Night monkeys represent a territorial species, territories are defended by conspecifics through the use of threatening and agonistic behaviours. Ranges between night monkey species often do overlap and result in interspecific aggressions such as vocalizing and chasing which may last up to an hour.

=== Diet ===
Night monkeys are primarily frugivorous, as fruits are easily distinguished through the use of olfactory cues, but leaf and insect consumption has also been observed in the cathemeral night monkey species A. azare. A study conducted by Wolovich et al., indicated that juveniles and females were much better at catching both crawling and flying insects than adult males. In general, the technique used by night monkeys in insect capturing is to use the palm of the hand to flatten a prey insect against a tree branch and then proceed to consume the carcass. During the winter months or when food sources are reduced, night monkeys have also been observed foraging on flowers such as Tabebuia heptaphylla, however this does not represent a primary food source.

=== Reproduction ===
In night monkeys, mating occurs infrequently, however females are fertile year-round, with reproductive cycles range from 13 to 25 days. The gestation period for night monkey is approximately 117– 159 days but varies from species to species. Birthing season extends from September to March and is species-dependent, with one offspring being produced per year; however, in studies conducted in captivity, twins were observed. Night monkeys reach puberty at a relatively young age, between 7 and 11 months, and most species attain full sexual maturity by the time they reach 2 years of age. A. azare represents an exception reaching sexual maturity by the age of 4.

== Behavior ==
The name "night monkey" comes from the fact that all species are active at night and are, in fact, the only truly nocturnal monkeys (an exception is the subspecies of Azara's night monkey, Aotus azarae azarae, which is cathemeral). Night monkeys make a notably wide variety of vocal sounds, with up to eight categories of distinct calls (gruff grunts, resonant grunts, sneeze grunts, screams, low trills, moans, gulps, and hoots), and a frequency range of 190–1,950 Hz. Unusual among the New World monkeys, they are monochromats, that is, they have no colour vision, presumably because it is of no advantage given their nocturnal habits. They have a better spatial resolution at low light levels than other primates, which contributes to their ability to capture insects and move at night. Night monkeys live in family groups consisting of a mated pair and their immature offspring. Family groups defend territories by vocal calls and scent marking.

The night monkey is socially monogamous, and all night monkeys form pair bonds. Only one infant is born each year. The male is the primary caregiver, and the mother carries the infant for only the first week or so of its life. This is believed to have developed because it increases the survival of the infant and reduces the metabolic costs on the female. Adults will occasionally be evicted from the group by same-sex individuals, either kin or outsiders.

=== Nocturnality ===
The family Aotidae is the only family of nocturnal species within the suborder Anthropoidea. Whereas other divisions of primates, including Strepsirrhini and Tarsiidae, include many nocturnal and cathemeral species, the anthropoids possess very few nocturnal species and therefore it is highly likely that the ancestors of the family Aotidae did not exhibit nocturnality and were rather diurnal species. The presence of nocturnal behavior in Aotidae therefore exemplifies a derived trait; an evolutionary adaptation that conferred greater fitness advantages onto the night monkey. Night monkey share some similarities with nocturnal prosimians including low basal metabolic rate, small body size and good ability to detect visual cues at low light levels. Their responses to olfactory stimulus are intermediate between those of the prosimians and diurnal primate species, however the ability to use auditory cues remains more similar to diurnal primate species than to nocturnal primate species. This provides further evidence to support the hypothesis that nocturnality is a derived trait in the family Aotidae.

As the ancestor of Aotidae was likely diurnal, selective and environmental pressures must have been exerted on the members of this family which subsequently resulted in the alteration of their circadian rhythm to adapt to fill empty niches. Being active in the night rather than during the day time, gave Aotus access to better food sources, provided protection from predators, reduced interspecific competition and provided an escape from the harsh environmental conditions of their habitat. To begin, resting during the day allows for decreased interaction with diurnal predators. Members of the family Aotidae apply predation avoidance in choosing strategic covered nest sites in trees. These primates carefully choose areas with sufficient foliage and vines to provide cover from the sun and camouflage from predators, but which simultaneously allow for visibility of ground predators and permit effective routes of escape should a predator approach too quickly. Activity at night also permits night monkeys to avoid aggressive interactions with other species such as competing for food and territorial disputes; as they are active when most other species are inactive and resting.

Night monkeys also benefit from a nocturnal life style as activity in the night provides a degree of protection from the heat of the day and the thermoregulation difficulties associated. Although night monkey, like all primates are endothermic, meaning they are able to produce their own heat, night monkeys undergo behavioural thermoregulation in order to minimize energy expenditure. During the hottest points of the day, night monkeys are resting and therefore expending less energy in the form of heat. As they carefully construct their nests, night monkeys also benefit from the shade provided by the forest canopy which enables them to cool their bodies through the act of displacing themselves into a shady area. Additionally, finding food is energetically costly and completing this process during the day time usually involves the usage of energy in the form of calories and lipid reserves to cool the body down. Foraging during the night when it is cooler, and when there is less competition, supports the optimal foraging theory; maximize energy input while minimizing energy output.

While protection from predators, interspecific interactions, and the harsh environment propose ultimate causes for nocturnal behavior as they increase the species fitness, the proximate causes of nocturnality are linked to the environmental effects on circadian rhythm. While diurnal species are stimulated by the appearance of the sun, in nocturnal species, activity is highly impacted by the degree of moon light available. The presence of a new moon has correlated with inhibition of activity in night monkeys who exhibit lower levels of activity with decreasing levels of moon light. Therefore, the lunar cycle has a significant influence on the foraging and a nocturnal behaviors of night monkey species.

=== Pair-bonded social animals (social monogamy) ===
Night monkeys are socially monogamous—they form a bond and mate with one partner. They live in small groups consisting of a pair of reproductive adults, one infant and one to two juveniles. These species exhibit mate guarding, a practice in which the male individual will protect the female he is bonded to and prevent other conspecifics from attempting to mate with her. Mate guarding likely evolved as a means of reducing energy expenditure when mating. As night monkey territories generally have some edge overlap, there can be a large number of individuals coexisting in one area which may make it difficult for a male to defend many females at once due to high levels of interspecific competition for mates. Night monkeys form bonded pairs and the energy expenditure of protecting a mate is reduced. Pair bonding may also be exhibited as a result of food distribution. In the forest, pockets of food can be dense or very patchy and scarce. Females, as they need energy stores to support reproduction are generally distributed to areas with sufficient food sources. Males will therefore also have to distribute themselves to be within proximity to females, this form of food distribution lends itself to social monogamy as finding females may become difficult if males have to constantly search for females which may be widely distributed depending on food availability that year.

However, while this does explain social monogamy, it does not explain the high degree of paternal care which is exhibited by these primates. After the birth of an infant, males are the primary carrier of the infant, carrying offspring up to 90% of the time. In addition to aiding in child care, males will support females during lactation through sharing their foraged food with lactating females. Generally, food sharing is not observed in nature as the search for food requires a great degree of energy expenditure, but in the case of night monkey males, food sharing confers offspring survival advantages. As lactating females may be too weak to forage themselves, they may lose the ability to nurse their child, food sharing therefore ensures that offspring will be well feed. The act of food sharing is only observed among species where there is a high degree of fidelity in paternity. Giving up valuable food sources would not confer an evolutionary advance unless it increased an individual's fitness; in this case, paternal care ensures success of offspring and therefore increases the father's fitness.

=== Olfactory communication and foraging ===
Recent studies have proposed that night monkeys rely on olfaction and olfactory cues for foraging and communication significantly more than other diurnal primate species. This trend is reflected in the species physiology; members of Aotidae possess larger scent perception organs than their diurnal counterparts. The olfactory bulb, accessory olfactory bulb and volume of lateral olfactory tract are all larger in Aotus than in any of the other new world monkey species. It is therefore likely that increased olfaction capacities improved the fitness of these nocturnal primate species; they produced more offspring and passed on these survival enhancing traits. The benefits of increased olfaction in night monkeys are twofold; increased ability to use scent cues has facilitated night time foraging and is also an important factor in mate selection and sexual attractivity.

As a substantial portion of the night monkey's activities occurring during the dark hours of the night, there is a much lower reliance of visual and tactile cues. When foraging at night, members of the family Aotidae will smell fruits and leaves before ingesting to determine the quality and safety of the food source. As they are highly frugivorous and cannot perceive colour well, smell becomes the primary determinant of the ripeness of fruits and is therefore an important component in the optimal foraging methods of these primates. Upon finding a rich food source, night monkeys have been observed scent marking not only the food source, but the route from their sleeping site to the food source as well. Scent can therefore be used as an effective method of navigation and reduce energy expenditure during subsequent foraging expeditions. Night monkeys possess several scent glands covered by greasy hair patches, which secrete pheromones that can be transferred onto vegetation or other conspecifics. Scent glands are often located subcaudal, but also occur near the muzzle and the sternum. The process of scent marking is accomplished through the rubbing of the hairs covering scent glands onto the desired "marked item".

Olfactory cues are also of significant importance in the process of mating and mate guarding. Male night monkeys will rub subcaudal glands onto their female partner in a process called "partner marking" in order to relay the signal to coexisting males that the female is not available for mating. Night monkeys also send chemical signals through urine to communicate reproductive receptivity. In many cases, male night monkeys have been observed drinking the urine of their female mate; it is proposed that the pheromones in the urine can indicate the reproductive state of a female and indicate ovulation. This is especially important in night monkeys as they cannot rely on visual cues, such as the presence of a tumescence, to determine female reproductive state. Therefore, night monkey olfactory communication, as a sexually dimorphic trait conferring increased reproductive success, is a result of sexual selection. This trait demonstrates sexual dimorphism, as males have larger subcaudal scent glands compared to female counterparts and sex differences have been recorded in the glandular secretions of each sex. There is a preference for scents of a particular type; those which indicate reproductive receptivity, which increases species fitness by facilitating the production of offspring.

== Conservation ==
According to the IUCN (the International Union for Conservation of Nature), the Peruvian night monkey is classified an Endangered species, four species are Vulnerable, four are Least-concern species, and two are data deficient. Most night monkey species are threatened by varying levels of habitat loss throughout their range, caused by agricultural expansion, cattle ranching, logging, armed conflict, and mining operations. To date, it is estimated that more than 62% of the habitat of the Peruvian night monkey has been destroyed or degraded by human activities. However, some night monkey species have become capable of adapting exceptionally well to anthropogenic influences in their environment. Populations of Peruvian night monkey have been observed thriving in small forest fragments and plantation or farmland areas, however this is likely possible given their small body size and may not be an appropriate alternate habitat option for other larger night monkey species. Studies have already been conducted into the feasibility of agroforestry; plantations which simultaneously support local species biodiversity. In the case of A. miconax, coffee plantations with introduced shade trees, provided quality habitat spaces. While the coffee plantation benefited from the increased shade—reducing weed growth and desiccation, night monkeys used the space as a habitat, a connection corridor or stepping stone area between habitats that provided a rich food source. However, some researchers question the agroforestry concept, maintaining that monkeys are more susceptible to hunting, predator and pathogens in plantation fields, thus indicating the need for further research into the solution before implementation.

Night monkeys are additionally threatened by both national and international trade for bushmeat and domestic pets. Since 1975, the pet trade of night monkeys has been regulated by CITES (the Convention on International Trade in Endangered Species). In the last forty years, nearly 6,000 live night monkeys and more than 7,000 specimens have been traded from the nine countries which they call home. While the restrictive laws put into place by CITES are aiding in the reduction of these numbers, 4 out of 9 countries, show deficiencies in maintaining the standards outlined by CITES Increased attention and enforcement of these laws will be imperative for the sustainability of night monkey populations.

Use in biomedical research poses another threat to night monkey biodiversity. Species such as Nancy Ma's night monkey, like human beings, are susceptible to infection by the Plasmodium falciparum parasite responsible for malaria. This trait caused them to be recommended by the World Health Organization as test subjects in the development of malaria vaccines. Up to 2008, more than 76 night monkeys died as a result of vaccine testing; some died from malaria, while others perished due to medical complications from the testing.

Increased research and knowledge of night monkey ecology is an invaluable tool in determining conservation strategies for these species and raising awareness for consequences of the anthropogenic threats facing these primates. Radio-collaring of free ranging primates proposes a method of obtaining more accurate and complete data surrounding primate behavior patterns. This in turn can aid in understanding what measures need to be taken to promote the conservation of these species. Radio collaring not only allows for the identification of individuals within a species, increased sample size, more detailed dispersal and range patterns, but also facilitates educational programs which raise awareness for the current biodiversity crisis. The usage of radio-collaring while potentially extremely valuable, has been shown to interfere with social group interactions, the development of better collaring techniques and technology will therefore be imperative in the realisation and successful use of radio collars on night monkeys.
