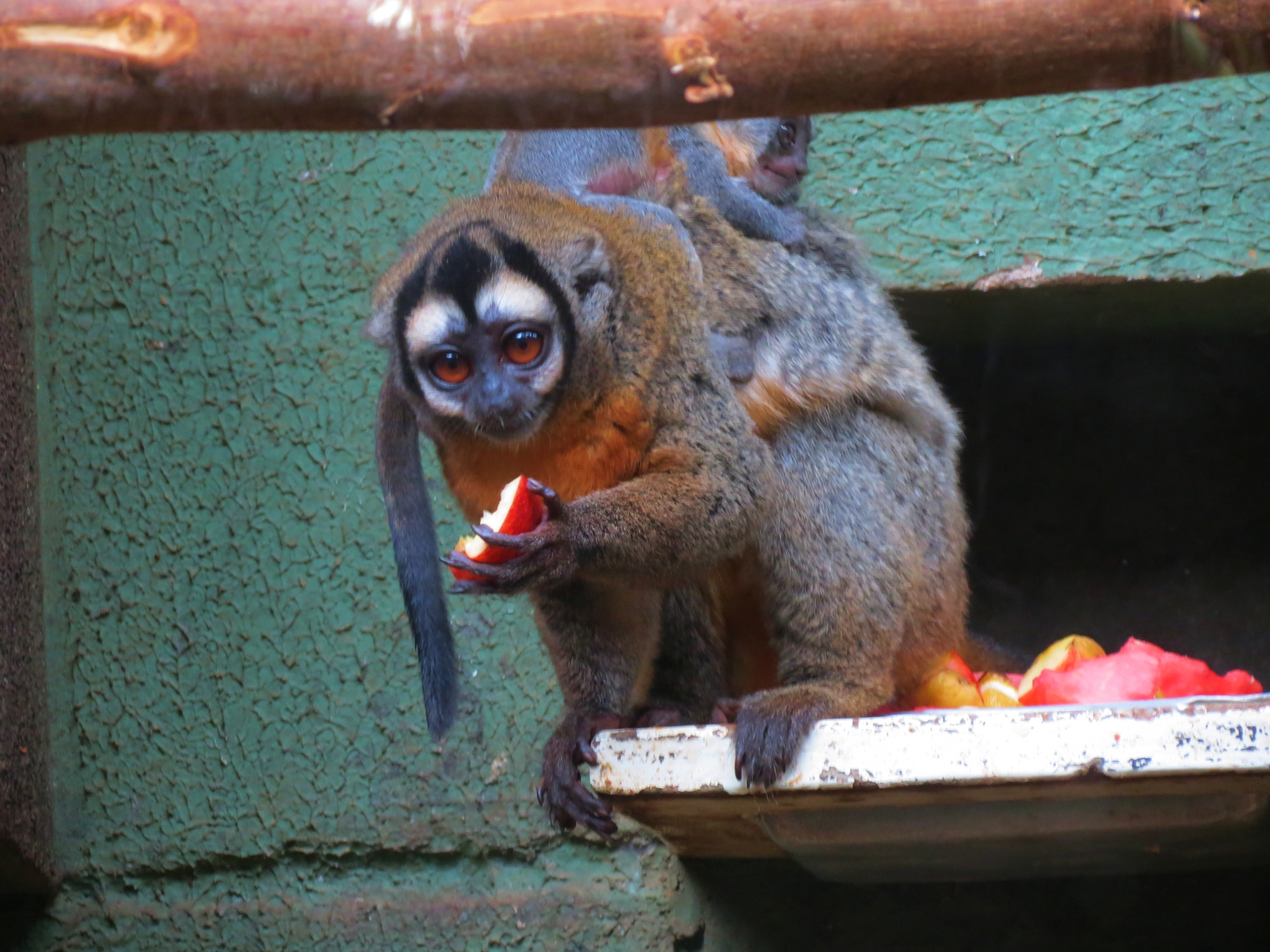

Conservation status
- Least Concern (IUCN 3.1)

Scientific classification
- Kingdom: Animalia
- Phylum: Chordata
- Class: Mammalia
- Infraclass: Placentalia
- Order: Primates
- Family: Aotidae
- Genus: Aotus
- Species: A. nigriceps

Binomial name
- Aotus nigriceps (Dollman, 1909)
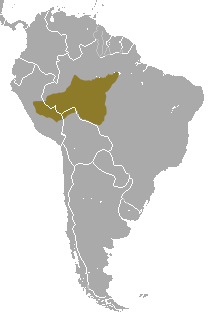
- Black-headed night monkey range

= Black-headed night monkey =

Species of New World monkey

The black-headed night monkey (Aotus nigriceps) is a night monkey species from South America. It is found in Brazil, Bolivia and Peru. The A. nigriceps in Peru were notably inhabiting areas that were degraded, and often these areas were disturbed either by human activities or natural occurrences in the ecosystem. A black-headed night monkey is about the same size as a small squirrel. Black-headed night monkeys have small ears that are hidden by their fur. When they become adults they are about 750g and usually are about 14 months old. Black-headed night monkeys have three black stripes that meet on their forehead. These monkeys have white patches by their eyes, cheeks, and under their mouth. Their eyes are very large and brown.

== Reproduction ==
A newborn usually weighs about 90 to 150g. Sexual maturity for males is at 2 years and for females is about 3 or 4 years. They occur in between August and February. A female only gives birth to one infant each year. The males are the primary care givers to the infants. The female starts biting the infants feet or tail about 2 weeks after so they go with the male and about 8 weeks they start to leave them.

== Behavior ==
Black-headed night monkeys live in small-family groups. Males attack other males and females attack the other females. These attacks can last in between 5 and 30 minutes. The reason why they attack is for territory. Whoever wins the attack gets to keep the territory along with any infants the losing pair have.

== Diet ==
Black-headed night monkeys are considered frugivorous. They usually eat leaves, flowers, moths, beetles and spiders.

== Names ==
It is called ausisiti in the Kwaza language of Rondônia, Brazil, and nu'nu' in the Shawi language of Peru.

== Parasites ==
A. nigroceps suffers from Plasmodium brasilianum malaria. P. brasilianum was first found in A. nigroceps by Araújo et al. 2013.
