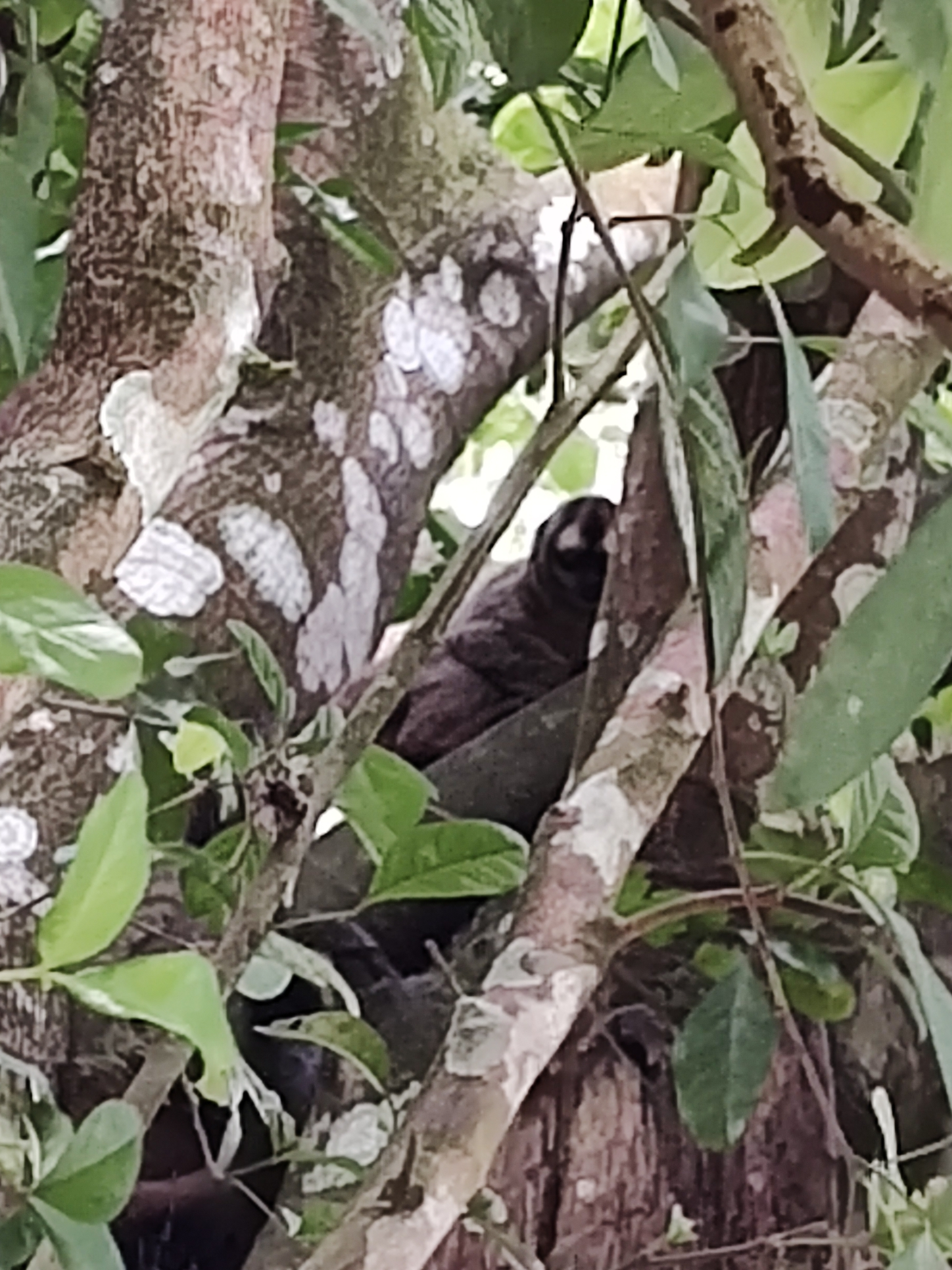

Conservation status
- Vulnerable (IUCN 3.1)

Scientific classification
- Kingdom: Animalia
- Phylum: Chordata
- Class: Mammalia
- Infraclass: Placentalia
- Order: Primates
- Family: Aotidae
- Genus: Aotus
- Species: A. brumbacki

Binomial name
- Aotus brumbacki Hershkovitz, 1983
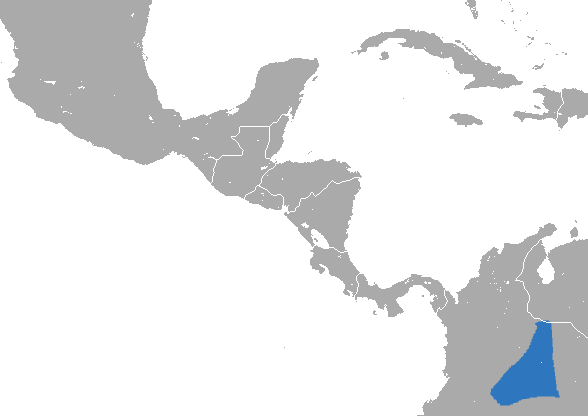
- Brumback's night monkey range

= Brumback's night monkey =

Species of New World monkey

Brumback's night monkey (Aotus brumbacki) is a species of night monkey found in Colombia. It has traditionally been considered a subspecies of gray-bellied night monkey, Aotus lemurinus. However, it has recently been argued that it should be considered a separate species.
