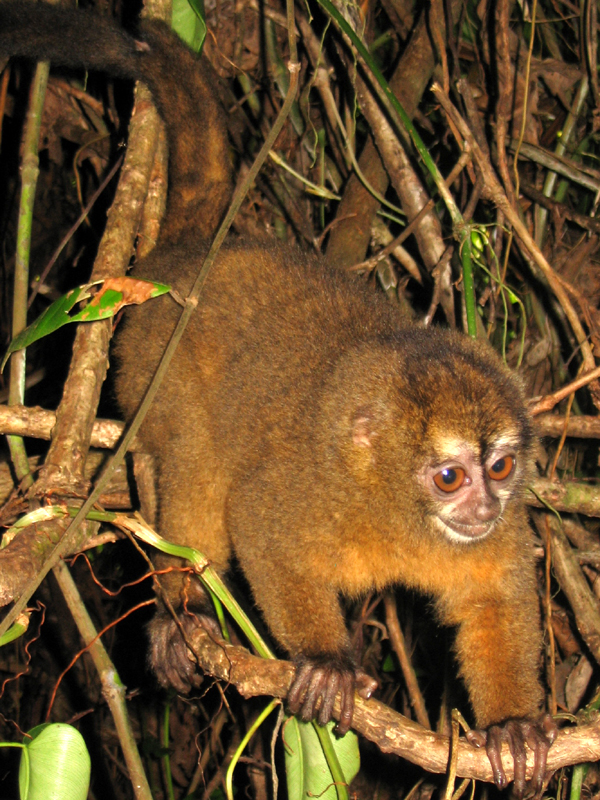

Conservation status
- Near Threatened (IUCN 3.1)

Scientific classification
- Kingdom: Animalia
- Phylum: Chordata
- Class: Mammalia
- Infraclass: Placentalia
- Order: Primates
- Family: Aotidae
- Genus: Aotus
- Species: A. zonalis

Binomial name
- Aotus zonalis E. A. Goldman, 1914
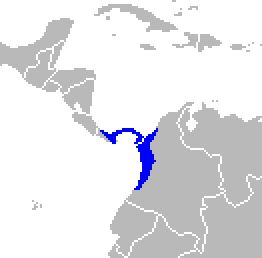
- Distribution of Aotus zonalis

= Panamanian night monkey =

Species of New World monkey

The Panamanian night monkey or Chocoan night monkey (Aotus zonalis) is a species of night monkey formerly considered a subspecies of the gray-bellied night monkey of the family Aotidae. Its range consists of Panama and the Chocó region of Colombia. There are also unconfirmed reports of its occurrence in Costa Rica, especially on the Caribbean coast of Costa Rica. The species definitely occurs in the Atlantic lowlands of Panama close to the Costa Rica border.

The exact classification of the Panamanian Night Monkey is uncertain. While some authors consider it a subspecies of the gray-bellied night monkey, A. lemurinus, other authors follow a study by Thomas Defler from 2001, which concluded that it is a separate species, A. zonalis.

The Panamanian night monkey is a relatively small monkey, with males weighing approximately 889 grams (31.4 oz) and females weighing about 916 grams (32.3 oz). The fur on the back ranges from grayish brown to reddish brown. The belly is yellow. The hair on the back of the hands and feet is black or dark brown, which is a key distinguishing feature from other northern "gray-necked" Aotus species; also, its hair is shorter. Other distinguishing features relate to its skull, which has a broad braincase, a depressed interorbital region, and large molariform teeth.

Like other night monkeys, the Panamanian night monkey has large eyes, befitting its nocturnal lifestyle. But unlike many nocturnal animal species, its eyes do not have a tapetum lucidum. Also like other night monkeys, it has a short tail relative to the body size.

The Panamanian night monkey is arboreal and nocturnal. It and the other members of the genus Aotus are the only nocturnal monkeys. It is found in several types of forest, including secondary forest and coffee plantations. It lives in small groups of between two and six monkeys, consisting of an adult pair and one infant and several juveniles and/or subadults. Groups are territorial, and groups occupy ranges that overlap only slightly.

Vocal, olfactory and behavioral forms of communication have all been recorded. At least nine vocal calls have been reported, including various types of grunts, screams, squeals, moans and trills. Males develop a scent gland near their tail at the age of about one year that is used for scent marking. Urine washing, in which urine is rubbed on the hands and feet, is also used. Behavioral communication appears to be less important than vocal and olfactory communication, but certain behavioral displays, including arched back displays, stiff legged jumping, urination, defecation and piloerection have been noted.

The Panamanian night monkey generally walks on all four legs, although it is capable of leaping or running when necessary. It eats a variety of foods. In one study, on Barro Colorado Island in Panama, its diet was found to consist of 65% fruits, 30% leaves and 5% insects.

In common with other night monkeys, the Panamanian night monkey is one of the few monogamous monkeys. The monogamous pair generally gives birth to a single infant each year, although twins occasionally occur. The gestation period is about 133 days. The father carries the infant from the time it is one or two days old, passing it to the mother for nursing.

Although viewing monkeys is popular with tourists visiting Panama, the Panamanian night monkey's nocturnal habits make it less often seen than the other Panamanian monkey species. However, with a skilled guide it is possible to observe the Panamanian night monkey.
