= Frugivore =

Organism that eats mostly fruit

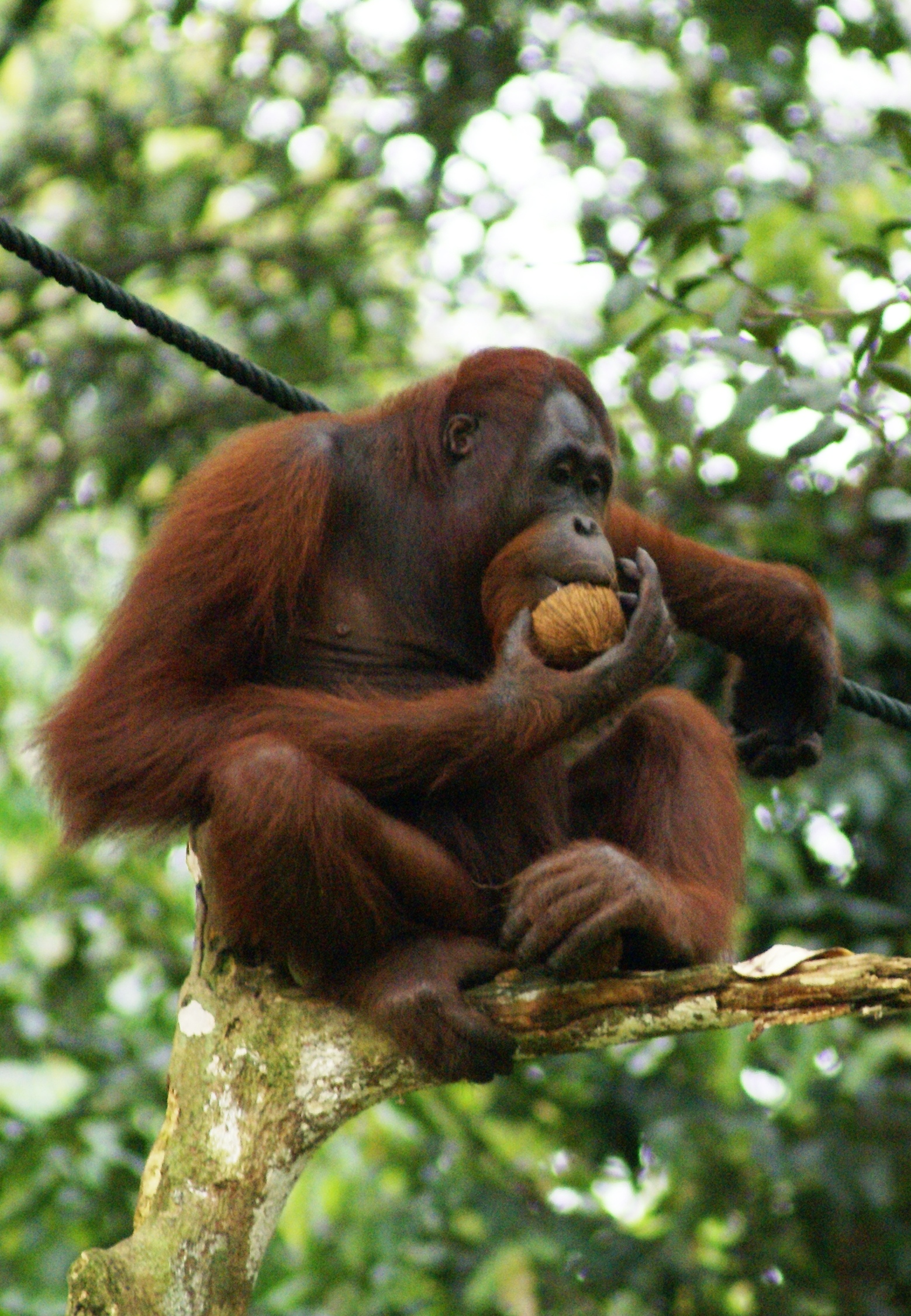
A Bornean orangutan (Pongo pygmaeus) eating a fruit.

A frugivore (/ˈfruːdʒɪvɔːr/ FROO-jih-vor) is an animal that thrives mostly on fruits.

Approximately 20% of mammalian herbivores eat fruit. Frugivores are highly dependent on the abundance and nutritional composition of fruits. Frugivores can benefit or hinder fruit-producing plants by either dispersing or destroying their seeds through digestion. When both the fruit-producing plant and the frugivore benefit by fruit-eating behavior the interaction is a form of mutualism.

== Frugivore seed dispersal ==
Seed dispersal is important for plants because it allows their progeny to move away from their parents over time. The advantages of seed dispersal may have led to the evolution of fleshy fruits, which entice animals to consume them and move the plant's seeds from place to place. While many fruit-producing plant species would not disperse far without frugivores, their seeds can usually germinate even if they fall to the ground directly below their parent.

Many types of animals are seed dispersers. Mammal and bird species represent the majority of seed-dispersing species. However, frugivorous tortoises, lizards, amphibians, and even fish also disperse seeds. For example, cassowaries are a keystone species because they spread fruit through digestion, many of the seeds of which will not grow unless they have been digested by the animal. While frugivores and fruit-producing plant species are present worldwide, there is some evidence that tropical forests have more frugivore seed dispersers than the temperate zones.

=== Ecological significance ===
Frugivore seed dispersal is a common phenomenon in many ecosystems. However, it is not a highly specific type of plant–animal interaction. For example, a single species of frugivorous bird may disperse fruits from several species of plants, or a few species of bird may disperse seeds of one plant species. This lack of specialization could be because fruit availability varies by season and year, which tends to discourage frugivore animals from focusing on just one plant species. Furthermore, different seed dispersers tend to disperse seeds to different habitats, at different abundances, and distances, depending on their behavior and numbers.

=== Plant adaptations to attract dispersers ===
There are a number of fruit characteristics that seem to be adaptive characteristics to attract frugivores. Animal-dispersed fruits may advertise their palatability to animals with bright colors and attractive smells (mimetic fruits). Fruit pulp is generally rich in water and carbohydrates and low in protein and lipids. However, the exact nutritional composition of fruits varies widely. The seeds of animal-dispersed fruits are often adapted to survive digestion by frugivores. For example, seeds can become more permeable to water after passage through an animal's gut. This leads to higher germination rates. Some mistletoe seeds even germinate inside the disperser's intestine.

== Frugivore adaptations for fruit consumption ==
Many seed-dispersing animals have specialized digestive systems to process fruits, which leave seeds intact. Some bird species have shorter intestines to rapidly pass seeds from fruits, while some frugivorous bat species have longer intestines. Some seed-dispersing frugivores have short gut-retention times, and others can alter intestinal enzyme composition when eating different types of fruits.

== Plant mechanisms to delay or deter frugivory ==
Many plants evolved to encourage mutualist frugivores to consume their fruit for seed dispersal. Some have also evolved mechanisms to decrease consumption of fruits when unripe and from non-seed-dispersing predators. Predators and parasites of fruit include seed predators, insects, and microbial frugivores.

Plants have developed both chemical and physical adaptations: physical deterrents may include cryptic coloration (e.g., green fruits blend in with the plant leaves), unpalatable textures (e.g., thick skins made of anti-nutritive substances), resins and saps (e.g., discourage animals from swallowing), and repellent substances, hard outer coats, spines, or thorns.

Chemical deterrents may include secondary metabolites produced by the plant as non-essential for primary processes, such as growth and reproduction. Toxins may have evolved to deter consumption by animals that disperse seeds into unsuitable habitats. Secondary chemical defenses are divided into three categories: nitrogen-based, carbon-based terpenes, and carbon-based phenolics.

=== Secondary chemical defenses ===
- Capsaicin is a carbon-based phenolic compound only found in plant genus Capsicum (chili and bell peppers). Capsaicin is responsible for the pungent, hot "flavor" of fruits and inhibits growth of microbes and invertebrates.
- Cyanogenic glycosides are nitrogen-based compounds found in 130 plant families, but not necessarily in the fruits, and may induce vomiting, diarrhea, or mild narcosis in animals.
- Emodin is a carbon-based phenolic compound in plants like rhubarb. Emodin can be cathartic, may kill dipteran larvae, inhibits growth of bacteria and fungi, and deters consumption by birds and mice.

== Frugivorous animals ==
=== Birds ===
Birds are a main focus of frugivory research. An article by Bette A. Loiselle and John G. Blake, "Potential Consequences of Extinction of Frugivorous Birds for Shrubs of a Tropical Wet Forest", discusses the important role frugivorous birds have on ecosystems. The conclusions of their research indicate how the extinction of seed-dispersing species could negatively affect seed removal, seed viability, and plant establishment. The article highlights the importance that seed-dispersing birds have on the deposition of plant species.

Examples of seed-dispersing birds are the hornbill, the toucan, the aracari, the cotinga (ex. Guianan cock-of-the-rock), and some species of parrots. Frugivores are common in the temperate zone, but mostly found in the tropics. Many frugivorous birds feed mainly on fruits until nesting season, when they incorporate protein-rich insects into their diet. Facultatively-baccivorous birds may also eat bitter berries, such as juniper, in months when alternative foods are scarce. In North America, red mulberry (Morus rubra) fruits are widely sought after by birds in spring and early summer; as many as 31 species of birds were recorded visiting a fruiting tree in Arkansas.

Prior to 1980, most reports of avian frugivory were made in the tropics. From 1979–1981, a number of studies recognized the importance of fruits to fall temperate assemblages of passerine migrants. The earliest of these field studies were conducted in the fall of 1974 in upstate New York by Robert Rybczynski & Donald K. Riker and separately by John W. Baird in New Jersey, each documenting ingestion of fruits in stands of fruit-bearing shrubs by mixed species assemblages dominated by migrant white-throated sparrows.

=== Non-avian dinosaurs ===
Evidence of fruit consumption has been identified in some non-avian dinosaurs, particularly among oviraptorosaurs. The Late Cretaceous caenagnathid Infernogallus jamesi, from North America, possessed specialized jaw musculature and a toothless beak adapted for processing soft plant material. Its jaw structure allowed forward-and-backward movements that could mash and shear food, resembling feeding adaptations found in modern fruit-eating parrots, particularly the Pesquet's parrot (Psittrichas fulgidus). These similarities suggest that fleshy fruits may have formed a substantial part of its diet, potentially with the flesh being consumed and the seeds discarded. The evolution of these feeding adaptations in caenagnathids also coincided with the diversification and increasing size of fleshy fruits among flowering plants during the Cretaceous. However, direct fossil evidence of fruit consumption in these dinosaurs remains lacking.

=== Mammals ===
Mammals are considered frugivorous if the seed is dispersed and able to establish. One example of a mammalian frugivore is the maned wolf, or Chrysocyon brachyurus, which is found in South America. A study by José Carlos Motta-Junior and Karina Martins found that the maned wolf is probably an important seed disperser. The researchers found that 22.5–54.3% of the diet was fruit.

65% of the diet of orangutans consists of fruit. Orangutans primarily eat fruit, along with young leaves, bark, flowers, honey, insects, and vines. One of their preferred foods is the fruit of the durian tree, which tastes somewhat like sweet custard. Orangutans discard the skin, eat the flesh, and spit out the seeds.

Other examples of mammalian frugivores include fruit bats and the gray-bellied night monkey, also known as the owl monkey:

"Owl monkeys are frugivores and supplement their diet with flowers, insects, nectar, and leaves (Wright 1989; 1994). They prefer small, ripe fruit when available and in order to find these, they forage in large-crown trees (larger than ten meters [32.8 ft]) (Wright 1986). Seasonal availability of fruit varies across environments. Aotus species in tropical forests eat more fruit throughout the year because it is more readily available compared to the dry forests where fruit is limited in the dry season and owl monkeys are more dependent on leaves."

=== Fish ===
Some species of fish are frugivorous, such as the tambaqui.

== Conservation ==
Since seed dispersal allows plant species to disperse to other areas, the loss of frugivores could change plant communities and lead to the local loss of particular plant species. Since frugivore seed dispersal is so important in the tropics, many researchers have studied the loss of frugivores and related it to changed plant population dynamics. Several studies have noted that even the loss of only large frugivores, such as monkeys, could have a negative effect, since they are responsible for certain types of long-distance seed dispersal that is not seen with other frugivore types, like birds. However, plant species whose seeds are dispersed by animals may be less vulnerable to fragmentation than other plant species. Frugivores can also benefit from the invasion of exotic fruit-producing species and can be vectors of exotic invasion by dispersing non-native seeds. Consequently, anthropogenic habitat loss and change may negatively affect some frugivore species but benefit others.

== See also ==
- Consumer-resource systems
- Fruit flies
- Fruitarianism
