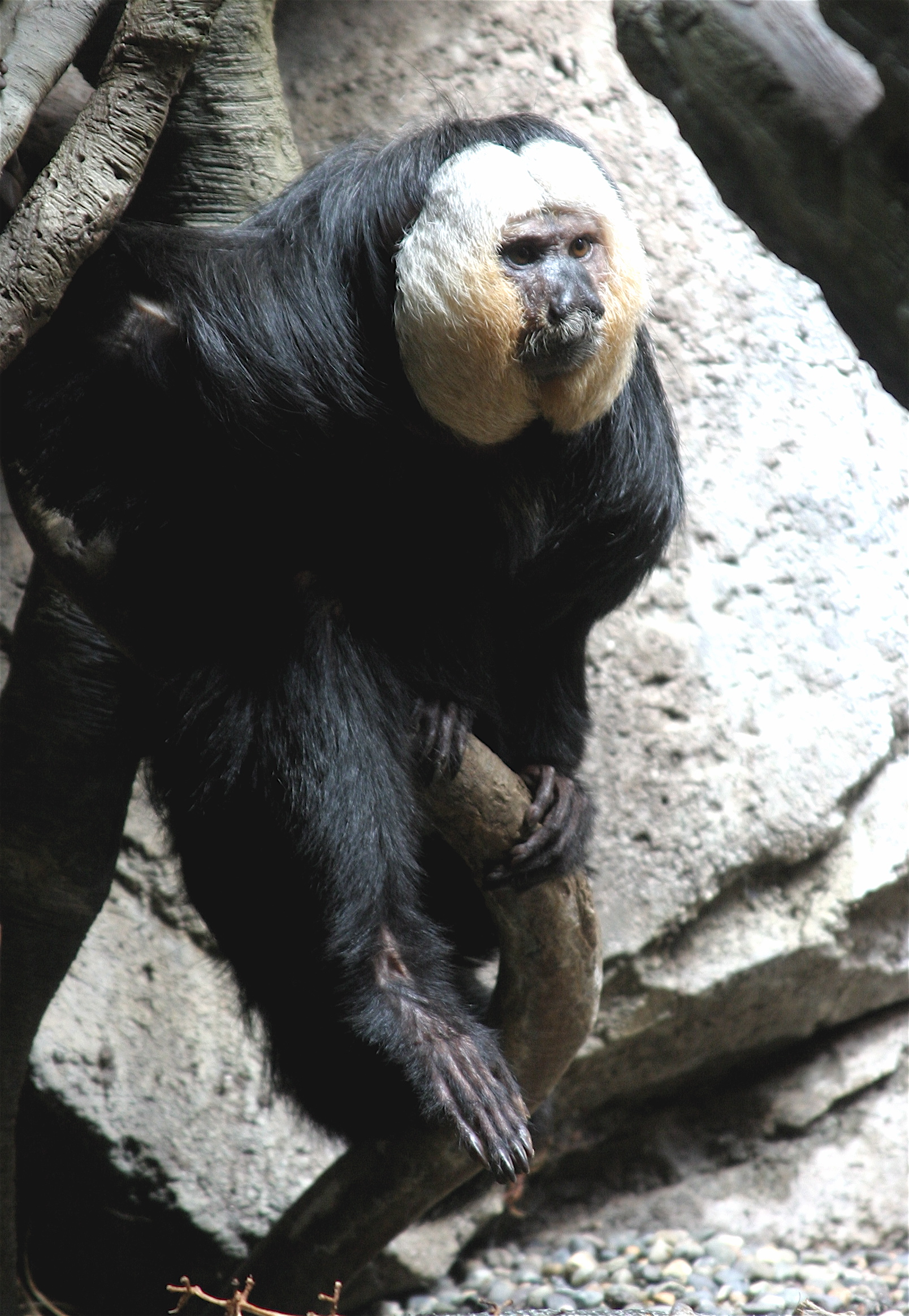
- White-faced saki (Pithicia pithecia)

Scientific classification
- Domain: Eukaryota
- Kingdom: Animalia
- Phylum: Chordata
- Class: Mammalia
- Order: Primates
- Suborder: Haplorhini
- Infraorder: Simiiformes
- Family: Pitheciidae
- Subfamily: Pitheciinae; Mivart, 1865

Genera
- Pithecia; Chiropotes; Cacajao; †Homunculus; †Mohanamico

= Pitheciinae =

Pitheciinae Temporal range: Miocene to recent

Subfamily of New World monkeys

Pitheciinae is a subfamily of the New World monkey family Pitheciidae. It contains three genera and 14 species. Pitheciines are forest dwellers from northern and central South America, east of the Andes.

They are small to medium-sized primates, with a stocky build due to their close skin. The skin is covered in shaggy fur, its coloring varies depending upon species from black to grey and brown up to white. Parts of the face can be bald. The tail, which is not used for grasping but for balance, is also hairy, although the uakari's tail is only a stub.

Like most New World monkeys, they are diurnal and arboreal. They are good climbers and spend the majority of their life in the trees. They live in groups ranging in number from small groups (such as with the saki monkeys ) to as many as 50 animals. They communicate with a set of sounds which typically includes high cries and a nearly bird-like twitter.

Pitheciines are generally omnivores, the main part of their diet coming from fruits and insects. This is supplemented by flowers, buds, nuts and small vertebrates. Large canines help them to break through the hard rind of the unripe fruits.

Births are typically of single offspring with a gestation time of about 5 to 6 months. They typically reach maturity at approximately 3 to 4 years and can become up to 15 years old.

== Classification ==
- Family Pitheciidae: titis, sakis and uakaris
  - Subfamily Pitheciinae
    - Genus Pithecia
      - Equatorial saki, Pithecia aequatorialis
      - White-footed saki or buffy saki, Pithecia albicans
      - Cazuza's saki, Pithecia cazuzai
      - Golden-faced saki, Pithecia chrysocephala
      - Hairy saki, Pithecia hirsuta
      - Burnished saki, Pithecia inusta
      - Rio Tapajós saki or Gray's bald-faced saki, Pithecia irrorata
      - Isabel's saki, Pithecia isabela
      - Monk saki, Pithecia monachus
      - Miller's saki, Pithecia milleri
      - Mittermeier's Tapajós saki, Pithecia mittermeieri (disputed)
      - Napo saki, Pithecia napensis
      - Pissinatti’s saki, Pithecia pissinattii (disputed)
      - White-faced saki, Pithecia pithecia
      - Rylands' bald-faced saki, Pithecia rylandsi (disputed)
      - Vanzolini's bald-faced saki, Pithecia vanzolinii
    - Genus Chiropotes
      - Black bearded saki, Chiropotes satanas
      - Red-backed bearded saki, Chiropotes chiropotes
      - Brown-backed bearded saki, Chiropotes israelita
      - Uta Hick's bearded saki, Chiropotes utahickae
      - White-nosed saki, Chiropotes albinasus
    - Genus Cacajao
      - Black-headed uakari, Cacajao melanocephalus
      - Bald uakari, Cacajao calvus
      - Aracá uakari, Cacajao ayresii
      - Neblina uakari, Cacajao hosomi
  - Subfamily Callicebinae
