= Cazuza's saki =

Conservation status
- Data Deficient (IUCN 3.1)

Scientific classification
- Kingdom: Animalia
- Phylum: Chordata
- Class: Mammalia
- Order: Primates
- Family: Pitheciidae
- Genus: Pithecia
- Species: P. cazuzai

Binomial name
- Pithecia cazuzai Marsh, 2014

Species of New World monkey

Cazuza's saki (Pithecia cazuzai) is a species of saki monkey, a type of New World monkey. It is endemic to northwestern Brazil.

== Taxonomy ==
Populations in this species were formerly classified within the Rio Tapajós saki (P. irrorata), but a 2014 study found these populations to have a distinct pelage from any other species in the genus, and they were thus reclassified into their own species, P. cazuzai. The American Society of Mammalogists, IUCN Red List, and ITIS all follow this classification.

The species is named after renowned Brazilian primatologist Dr. José de Sousa e Silva Júnior, nicknamed "Cazuza".

== Distribution ==
It is known only from a small region of northern Brazil in the state of Amazonas, where it is found south of the Solimões River on either side of the Juruá River at Fonte Boa and Uarini. More information may be needed to truly quantify the species' range.

== Description ==
Both male and female Cazuza's sakis have a distinct pelage from any other Pithecia species. Unlike the white-faced saki (P. pithecia), male Cazuza's sakis are not silky black, but rather coarsely black with very lightly white-tipped fur, and also have a short, dark ruff. Their faces have a diffuse white ring that distinguishes them from all other species in the genus with white facial hairs. Although males share thick lip hairs with several other species such as the hairy (P. hirsuta) and golden-faced (P. chrysocephala) sakis, they have a different facial coloration from them. Female Cazuza's sakis have different faces from all other saki species in the region.

== Status ==
This species is thought to be threatened by logging and poaching, as well as its small range, and thus its population is thought to be declining. They are sometimes also found in the pet trade. However, this species remains poorly-known and it is thus classified as data deficient on the IUCN Red List.
