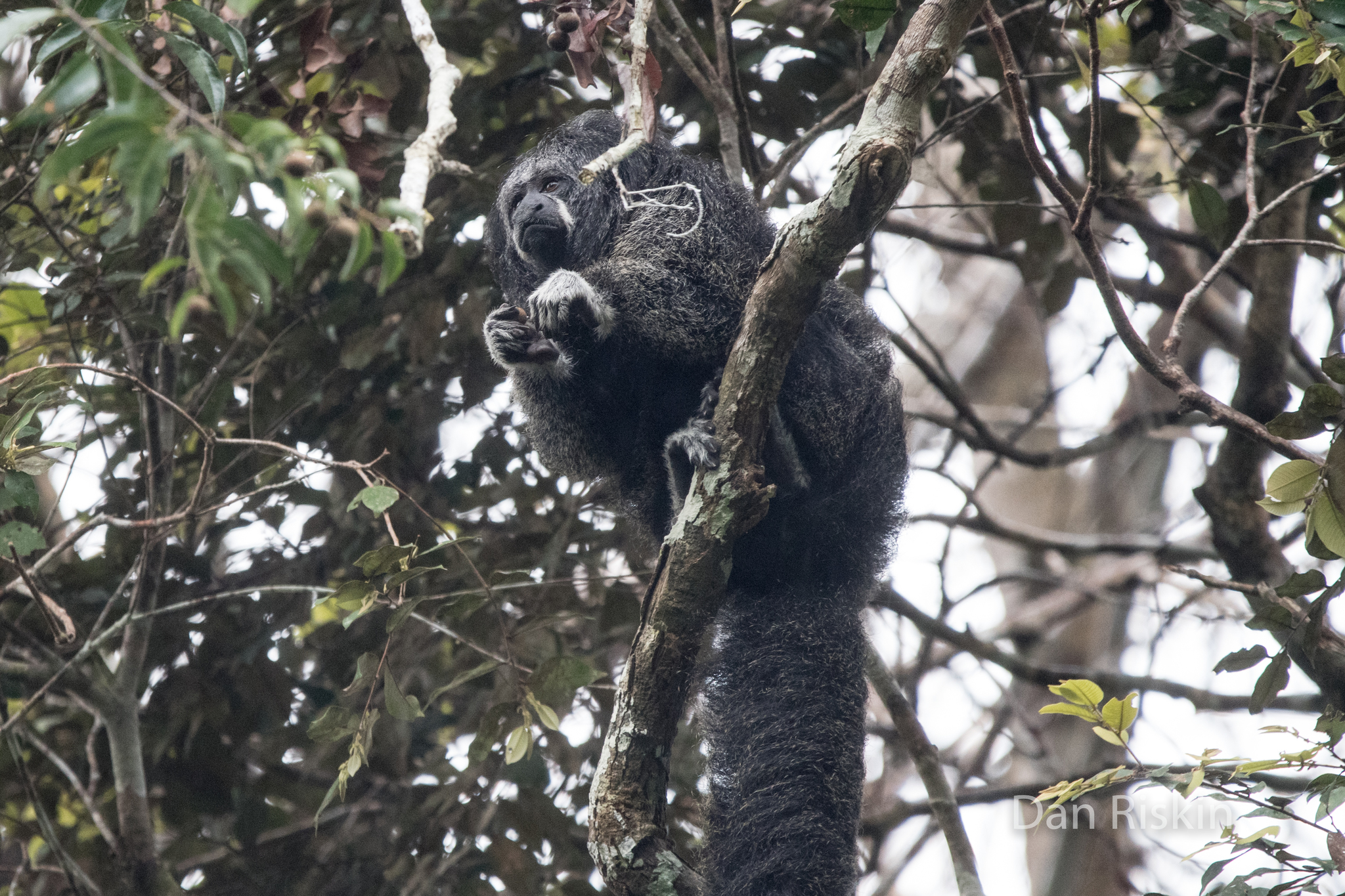

Conservation status
- Data Deficient (IUCN 3.1)

Scientific classification
- Kingdom: Animalia
- Phylum: Chordata
- Class: Mammalia
- Order: Primates
- Family: Pitheciidae
- Genus: Pithecia
- Species: P. isabela

Binomial name
- Pithecia isabela Marsh, 2014

= Isabel's saki =

Species of New World monkey

Isabel's saki (Pithecia isabela) is a species of saki monkey, a type of New World monkey. It is endemic to a small portion of northern Peru.

== Taxonomy ==
Populations in this species were formerly classified within the monk saki (P. monachus), but a 2014 study described these populations as a distinct species, P. isabela, based on their distinctive pelage. The American Society of Mammalogists, IUCN Red List, and ITIS all follow this classification.

It was named in honor of Isabel Godin des Odonais, an 18th-century Ecuadorian noblewoman who trekked across South America to reunite with her husband.

== Distribution ==
It is known only from a small portion of northern Peru in the vicinity of the Pacaya-Samiria National Reserve.

== Description ==
This species closely resembles the Napo saki (P. napensis), with both species sharing an overall dark coloration with distinctive white patches above the eyes, but P. napensis also has dense white fur on the forehead, while P. isabela has much more diffuse white fur. P. isabela also has a less extensive, slightly duller orange ruff than P. napensis.

== Status ==
This species is thought to be threatened by logging and poaching, as well as its small range, and thus its population is thought to be declining. They are sometimes also found in the pet trade. In addition, numerous tourist lodges have sprung up within the Pacaya-Samiria National Reserve due to increasing ecotourism, and tourist photos indicate that other saki species such as the equatorial saki (P. aequatorialis) and potentially P. napensis have been introduced to these lodges as free-ranging pets; if these animals become established in the wild, they could potentially hybridize with the native P. isabela. However, this species remains poorly-known and it is thus classified as data deficient on the IUCN Red List.
