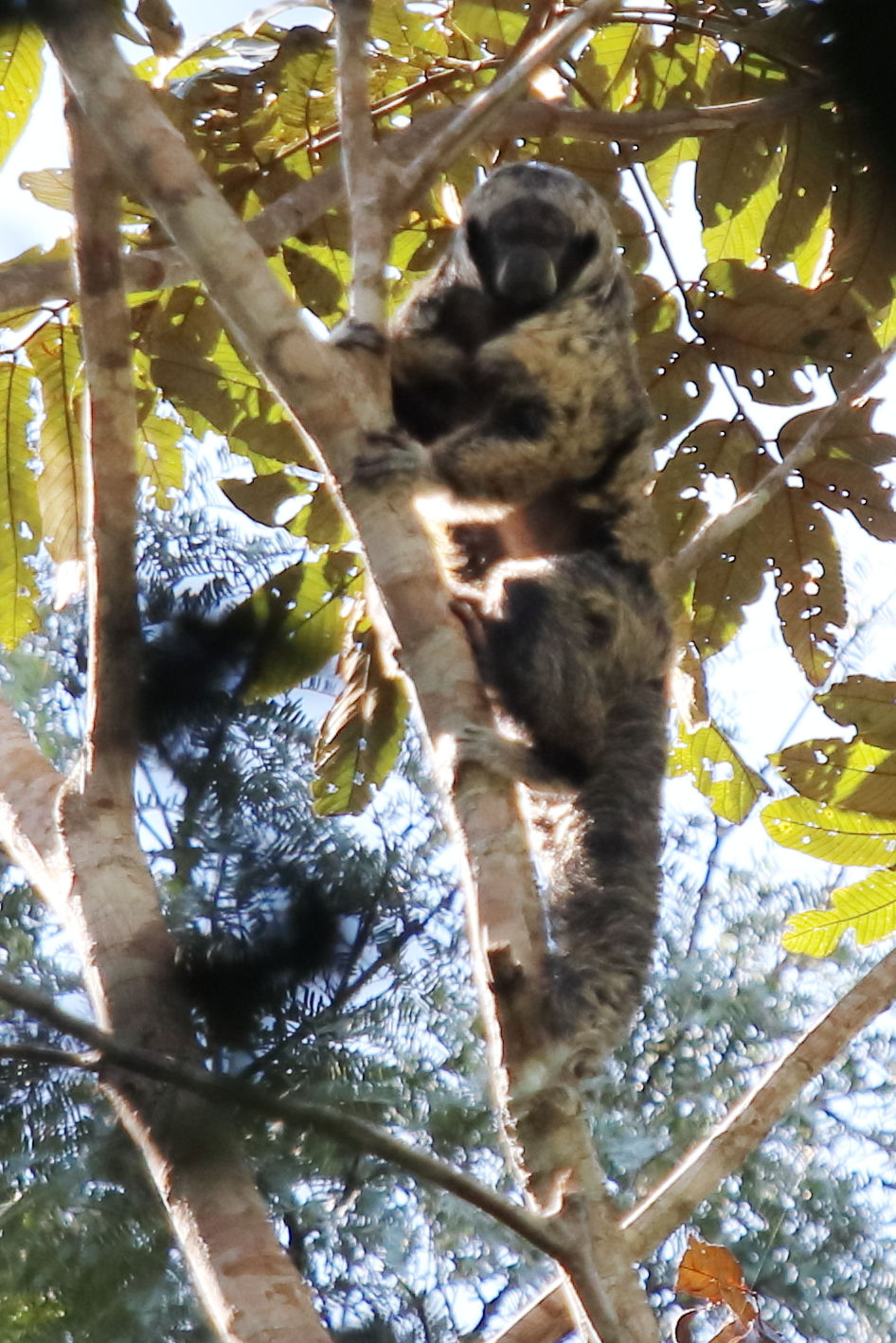

Conservation status
- Vulnerable (IUCN 3.1)

Scientific classification
- Kingdom: Animalia
- Phylum: Chordata
- Class: Mammalia
- Order: Primates
- Family: Pitheciidae
- Genus: Pithecia
- Species: P. rylandsi

Binomial name
- Pithecia rylandsi Marsh, 2014

= Rylands' bald-faced saki =

Disputed species of New World monkey

Rylands' bald-faced saki (Pithecia rylandsi) is a disputed species of saki monkey, a type of New World monkey. It is found in Bolivia, Peru, and Brazil.

== Taxonomy ==
Populations in this species were formerly classified within the Rio Tapajós saki (P. irrorata), but a 2014 study described these populations as a distinct species, P. rylandsi, based on their distinctive pelage. However, a 2019 study, also analyzing pelage color variation across the range of the P. irrorata species complex, delineated only two distinctive groups corresponding to P. irrorata and Vanzolini's bald-faced saki (P. vanzolini), with the distinctive pelage used to distinguish P. rylandsi falling within the range of variation of P. irrorata. In addition, the study found that due to an unclear type locality, the holotype of P. irrorata may have been collected within the range of P. rylandsi, which would render rylandsi instantly synonymous with P. irrorata. Based on this study, the American Society of Mammalogists (tentatively, pending further phylogenetic studies) synonymized rylandsi with irrorata, but the IUCN Red List and ITIS retain rylandsi as a distinct species.

This species is named after Brazilian primatologist Anthony Rylands, a senior research scientist at Conservation International, deputy chair of the IUCN/SSC Primate Specialist Group, member of the Brazilian Academy of Sciences, a former Vertebrate Zoology professor at the Federal University of Minas Gerais, and founding editor for the journal Neotropical Primates.

== Distribution ==
This species is found in northwestern Bolivia, southeastern Peru, and southern Rondônia & western Mato Grosso in Brazil. It is found north of the Madre de Dios River in Bolivia and Peru, and east & north of the Guaporé River in Brazil. It may range as far north as the Ji-Paraná River or west to the Jamari River.

== Description ==
It is one of the largest of the sakis. This species is easily distinguishable from all other sakis by its very large size, very black, bare face, and the extreme white grizzling, which can often cause older males to look almost entirely white. Younger males are black in color with moderate grizzling. Adult females are almost as intensely white as males, and their hair on the forehead can form white "bangs".

== Status ==
This species is thought to be threatened by deforestation for cattle ranching, as well as poaching, and thus its population is thought to be declining. They are sometimes also found in the pet trade. It is thus classified as Vulnerable by the IUCN Red List.
