= Pissinatti's saki =

Conservation status
- Data Deficient (IUCN 3.1)

Scientific classification
- Kingdom: Animalia
- Phylum: Chordata
- Class: Mammalia
- Order: Primates
- Family: Pitheciidae
- Genus: Pithecia
- Species: P. pissinattii

Binomial name
- Pithecia pissinattii Marsh, 2014

Disputed species of New World monkey

Pissinatti's saki or Pissinatti's bald-faced saki (Pithecia pissinattii) is a disputed species of saki monkey, a type of New World monkey. It is endemic to Brazil.

== Taxonomy ==
Populations in this species were formerly classified within the Rio Tapajós saki (P. irrorata), but a 2014 study described these populations as a distinct species, P. pissinattii, based on their distinctive pelage. However, a 2019 study, also analyzing pelage color variation across the range of the P. irrorata species complex, delineated only two distinctive groups corresponding to P. irrorata and Vanzolini's bald-faced saki (P. vanzolini), with the distinctive pelage used to distinguish P. pissinatii falling within the range of variation of P. irrorata. In addition, the study found that due to an unclear type locality, the holotype of P. irrorata may have been collected within the range of P. pissinatii, which would render pissinattii instantly synonymous with P. irrorata. Based on this study, the American Society of Mammalogists (tentatively, pending further phylogenetic studies) synonymized pissinattii with irrorata, but the IUCN Red List and ITIS retain pissinattii as a distinct species.

This species was named after Alcides Pissinatti, a Brazilian veterinarian who is the co-founder of the Centro de Primatologia do Rio de Janeiro and vice president of the Brazilian Academy of Veterinary Sciences, and pioneered captive breeding for endangered Brazilian primates.

== Distribution ==
This species is endemic to Brazil, where it is found south of the Solimões River between the Madeira and Purus rivers. It is unknown how far south this species reaches before meeting with P. irrorata.

== Description ==
Both sexes have pink to dark red-colored faces, with the faces of older females tending towards black, and also have black fur with distinct grizzling. Males have a distinct orange ruff; younger males are highly grizzled, but older males are not as much. Females have a tanner back and more grizzling.

== Status ==
This species is thought to be threatened by logging & poaching and thus its population is thought to be declining. They are sometimes also found in the pet trade, and it is known to be kept as a free-ranging "pet" at Juma Jungle Lodge, Brazil. However, this species remains poorly-known and it is thus classified as data deficient on the IUCN Red List.
