= Mittermeier's Tapajós saki =

Conservation status
- Vulnerable (IUCN 3.1)

Scientific classification
- Kingdom: Animalia
- Phylum: Chordata
- Class: Mammalia
- Order: Primates
- Family: Pitheciidae
- Genus: Pithecia
- Species: P. mittermeieri

Binomial name
- Pithecia mittermeieri Marsh, 2014

Disputed species of New World monkey

Mittermeier's Tapajós saki (Pithecia mittermeieri) is a disputed species of saki monkey, a type of New World monkey. It is endemic to west-central Brazil.

== Taxonomy ==
Populations in this species were formerly classified within the Rio Tapajós saki (P. irrorata), but a 2014 study described these populations as a distinct species, P. mittermeieri, based on their distinctive pelage. However, a 2019 study, also analyzing pelage color variation across the range of the P. irrorata species complex, delineated only two distinctive groups corresponding to P. irrorata and Vanzolini's bald-faced saki (P. vanzolini), with the distinctive pelage used to distinguish P. mittermeieri falling within the range of variation of P. irrorata. In addition, the study found that due to an unclear type locality, the holotype of P. irrorata may have been collected within the range of P. mittermeieri, which would render mittermeieri instantly synonymous with P. irrorata. Based on this study, the American Society of Mammalogists (tentatively, pending further phylogenetic studies) synonymized mittermeieri with irrorata, but the IUCN Red List and ITIS retain mittermeieri as a distinct species.

This species is named after famed American primatologist Russell Mittermeier.

== Distribution ==
This species is endemic to Brazil, where it is found south of the Amazon River between the Madeira and Tapajós rivers. Their range has significantly shrunk from its former extent due to human impacts, and presently, most populations are found south of the Aripuanã River in Mato Grosso state. In 2015, populations of this species were discovered in the northern Pantanal.

== Description ==
This is one of the most variable of saki species in terms of coloration. Males of this species have a largely black coat with long white bands of grizzling and forearms covered in dense, short, white hairs. They have a bright orange ruff. Females have a similar coloration but are less grizzled.

== Status ==
In the southern portion of its range (Rondônia), it is threatened by hunting and habitat loss, and in the more northern portions of its range it is threatened by deforestation and habitat fragmentation. It is thus classified as Vulnerable on the IUCN Red List.
