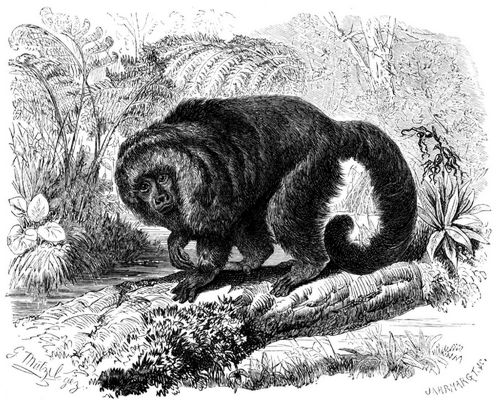
- Illustration by Gustav Mützel

Conservation status
- Least Concern (IUCN 3.1)

Scientific classification
- Kingdom: Animalia
- Phylum: Chordata
- Class: Mammalia
- Order: Primates
- Family: Pitheciidae
- Genus: Pithecia
- Species: P. hirsuta

Binomial name
- Pithecia hirsuta Spix, 1823

= Hairy saki =

Species of New World monkey

The hairy saki (Pithecia hirsuta) is a species of saki monkey, a type of New World monkey. It is found in northern Peru, southern Colombia, and a small portion of northwestern Brazil.

== Taxonomy ==
It was described in 1823 by Johann Baptist von Spix, but was later merged with the monk saki (P. monachus). However, a 2014 study revived it as a distinct species based on differences in pelage coloration. The American Society of Mammalogists, IUCN Red List, and ITIS all follow this classification.

== Distribution ==
This species is found roughly at the intersection between Brazil, Peru, and Colombia, and ranges west of the Rio Negro, north of the Solimões River & Napo River, and south of the Japurá River. It is not known how far west it occurs, and where the boundary between this species and Miller's saki (P. milleri) is.

== Description ==
It can be considered the most uniform and plain of the sakis, with very little differences in coloration between males and females. Both are largely blackish agouti in coloration.

== Status ==
This species is thought to be threatened by logging & poaching and thus its population is thought to be declining. They are sometimes also found in the pet trade. However, this species remains poorly-known and it is thus classified as data deficient on the IUCN Red List.
