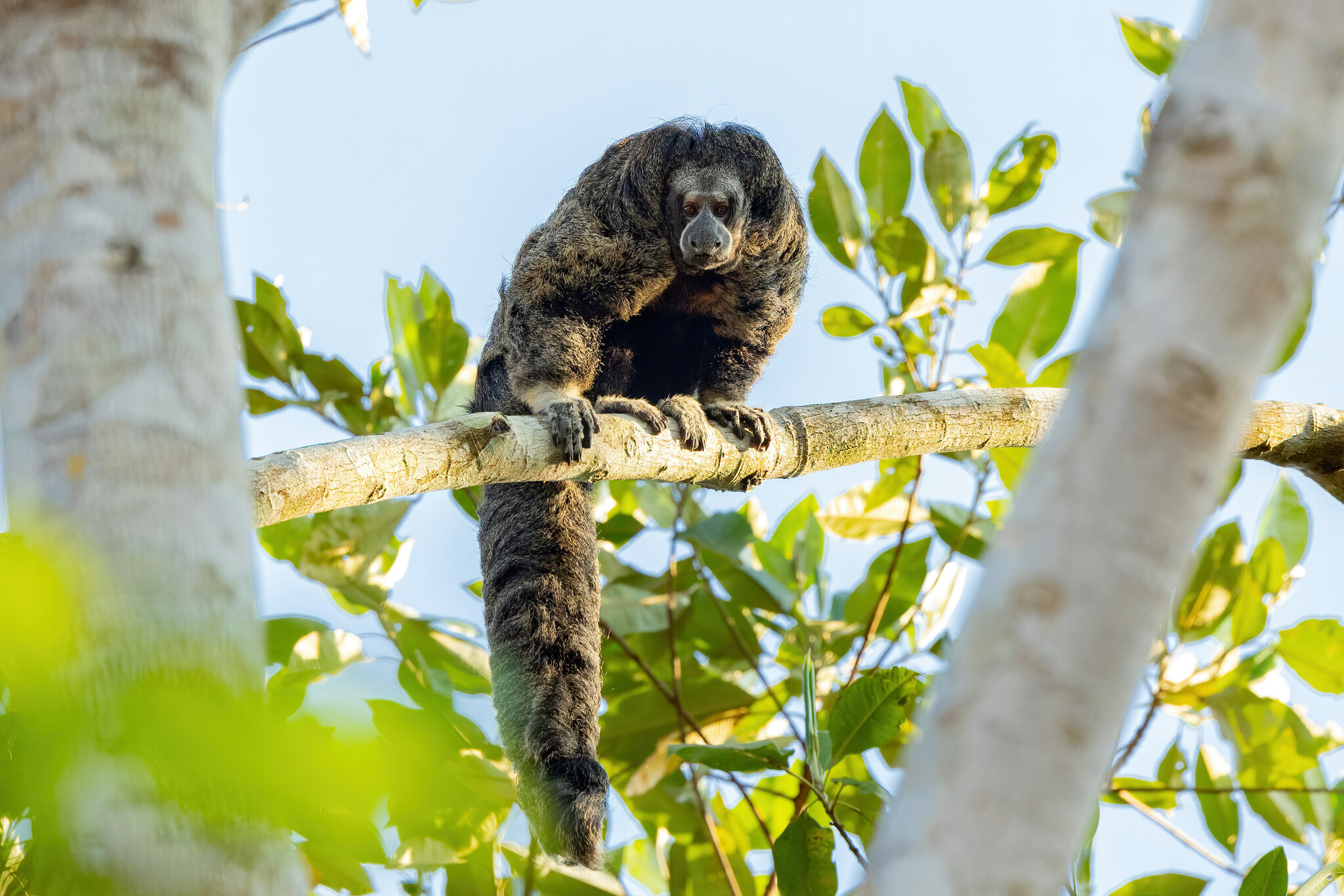

Conservation status
- Least Concern (IUCN 3.1)

Scientific classification
- Kingdom: Animalia
- Phylum: Chordata
- Class: Mammalia
- Order: Primates
- Family: Pitheciidae
- Genus: Pithecia
- Species: P. inusta

Binomial name
- Pithecia inusta Spix, 1823

= Burnished saki =

Species of New World monkey

The burnished saki (Pithecia inusta) is a species of saki monkey, a type of New World monkey. It is found in central Peru and a small portion of adjacent Brazil.

== Taxonomy ==
It was described in 1823 by Johann Baptist von Spix, but was later merged with the monk saki (P. monachus). However, a 2014 study revived it as a distinct species based on differences in pelage coloration of juvenile individuals. The American Society of Mammalogists, IUCN Red List, and ITIS all follow this classification.

== Distribution ==
This species is found throughout much of central Peru, primarily in the Ucayali River watershed, and a small portion of adjacent western Brazil.

== Description ==
Adult individuals have a face covered in a burnt tan-colored fur. It can be distinguished from P. monachus by the facial coloration of juveniles, with juvenile males having closely pressed white hairs and females having gray-black or brownish faces that turn white, in contrast to the two-toned brown and white faces of P. monachus.

== Status ==
This species is thought to be threatened by logging and poaching and thus its population is thought to be declining. They are sometimes also found in the pet trade. However, due to its wide range, it is classified as least concern on the IUCN Red List.
