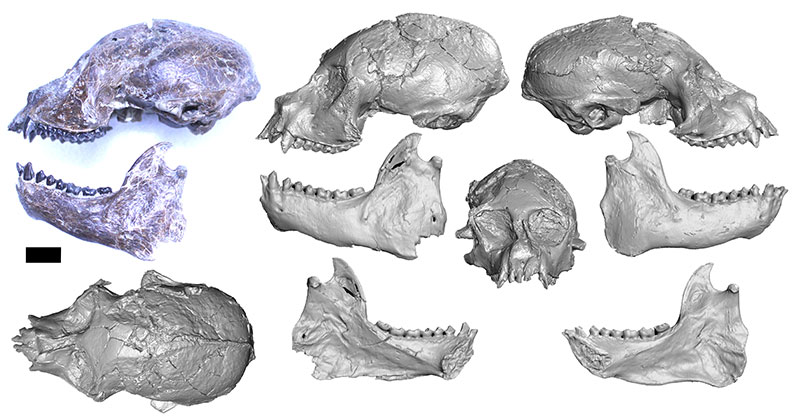
- Fossil skull of Homunculus patagonicus, scale bar = 1 centimetre (0.39 in)

Scientific classification
- Kingdom: Animalia
- Phylum: Chordata
- Class: Mammalia
- Order: Primates
- Parvorder: Platyrrhini
- Genus: †Homunculus; Ameghino, 1891

Type species
- Homunculus patagonicus Ameghino, 1891

Other Species
- Homunculus vizcainoi Kay & Perry, 2019

Synonyms
- Synonyms of H. patagonicus: †Anthropops perfectus Ameghino, 1891; †Pitheculus australis Ameghino, 1891; †Ecphantodon ceboides Mercerat, 1891; †Stilotherium grande Ameghino, 1894; †Homunculus ameghinoi Bluntschli, 1931; †Homunculus grandis Hershkovitz, 1981; †Killikaike blakei Tejedor et al., 2006

= Homunculus (genus) =

Homunculus Temporal range: Early-Mid Miocene (Santacrucian-Mayoan) 17.5–11.6 Ma

Extinct genus of monkey

Homunculus (Latin: [hɔˈmʊŋkʊlʊs]; "little person") is an extinct genus of New World monkey that lived in Patagonia during the Miocene. Two species are known: Homunculus patagonicus and Homunculus vizcainoi, which are known from material found in the Santa Cruz Formation in the far south of Argentina. Reaching a latitude of ~55°S at the time it lived, it is the southernmost non-human primate ever recorded.

== Taxonomy ==
=== Early history ===
The holotype of Homunculus patagonicus (MACN-A 634), a partial skull, was discovered around the Río Gallegos, though more specific details of its provenance have never been given. It is likely, from its location, that the holotype originates from strata belonging to the Santa Cruz Formation. At some point prior to 1891, it entered the collection of palaeontologist Carlos Ameghino and in that year it was described by his brother, Florentino. At some point, MACN-A 634 was lost. It was, in 2008, replaced with a neotype, MACN-A 575. A second Homunculus, H. vizcainoi, also from the Santa Cruz Formation, was described in 2019.

=== Synonyms ===
In the same year as Florentino Ameghino's paper, Swiss geologist and palaeontologist Alcides Mercerat described an incomplete mandibular fragment, bearing part of a molar. He dubbed the specimen Ecphantodon ceboides. However, E. ceboides was treated by Ameghino as indistinguishable from Homunculus, and he opted to synonymise the two. The type specimen of E. ceboides has been lost. In the paper describing H. patagonicus, Florentino Ameghino also named Anthropops perfectus, which he distinguished based on purported characteristics of the mandible and lower canine, and Pitheculus australis. In 1894, he named Stilotherium grande, which he suggested to be a marsupial. However, subsequent authors, like Osvaldo A. Reig, disagreed with this assessment, and 1981, Philip Hershkovitz determined that it belonged to Homunculus. Hershkovitz erected a new species, H. grandis. Even in the absence of the holotype, further specimens have been assigned to H. patagonicus. Notable among these is MACN-A 5968, the left side of a partial skull, recovered from Puesto Estancia La Costa. In 2008, a genus-level revision of Homunculus was carried out, whereupon it was concluded that Anthropops, Pitheculus and Stilotherium were all junior synonyms of Homunculus. Some authors consider Killikaike blakei to be a junior synonym for H. patagonicus, but others consider the species distinct. A 2025 study of an associated skeleton of Homunculus again concluded that Killikaike is a junior synonym of Homunculus patagonicus.

=== Classification ===
Some studies have regarded Homunculus as a crown group platyrrhine and a member of the family Pitheciidae, possibly belonging to a tribe of its own (Homuncilini), while other studies have regarded it as a stem-group platyrrhine outside any modern group. The latter is supported by the morphology of its nasal turbinates, which are dissimilar to those of crown-group platyrrhines.

== Description ==
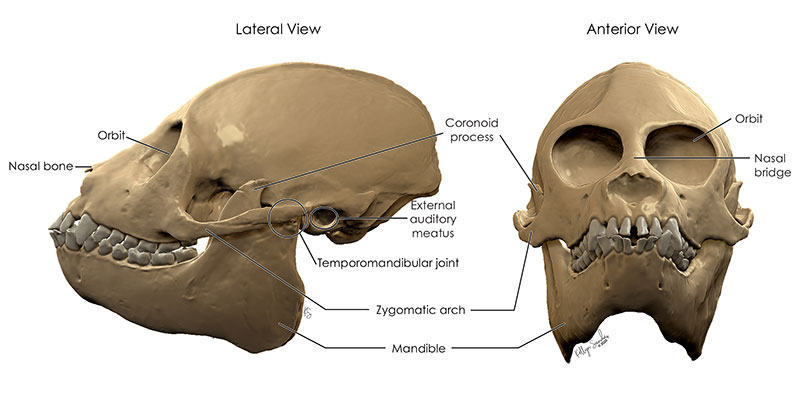
3D model of the skull of Homunculus patagonicus

H. patagonicus was a robustly built, quadrupedal primate, with body mass estimates varying between 1.4 and 5.9 kg (3.1 and 13.0 lb) based on different techniques, with a 2025 study estimating a body mass of around 2 kilograms (4.4 lb), comparable to a titi monkey or a saki monkey. The interorbital region, the portion of the skull between the orbits (eye sockets) was wide, similar to in titi monkeys (Callicebinae). The frontal bone was unvaulted, unlike modern capuchin monkeys (Cebinae). The maxillary sinus was relatively large, and the nasals were quite wide. The premaxilla was fairly procumbent. The main body of the mandible, the corpus, was deeper posteriorly (towards the rear), similar to in douroucoulis (Aotus). The tooth rows converged anteriorly (towards the front). The incisors were narrow and fairly high crowned. The second premolar is wedge-shaped, compressed transversely (across) and has a large honing facet (wear pattern) from the upper canine. The molars have fairly long talonids, and the trigonids were short, especially in the first molar. The postcrania have a few attributes indicating a relatively basal position, such as the form of its nasal turbinates and an epidoncylar foramen. The radius was similar to modern cebids, and could rotate freely.

== Ecology ==
Its morphology suggests that Homunculus was a diurnal (day active) arboreal primate that spent a significant amount of time climbing and clinging to trees, probably occasionally leaping between them. Although one study suggested that it was primarily frugivorous based on dental wear, this has been disputed, and other studies suggest the diet of Homunculus likely consisted of fruit, leaves, and seeds, including relatively hard items, with the significant input of abrasive volcanic dust into the environment of the Santa Cruz Formation being the likely cause of the heavy tooth wear observed in adult Homunculus teeth. The large roots of its postcanine teeth also suggests a diet consisting of highly mechanically resistant foods.

The Santa Cruz Formation in which Homunculus has been found, and from which the remains of many other species of prehistoric animal have been uncovered, is thought to have been relatively warm and humid, including a mix of open savanna, gallery forests and semi-deciduous forests.
