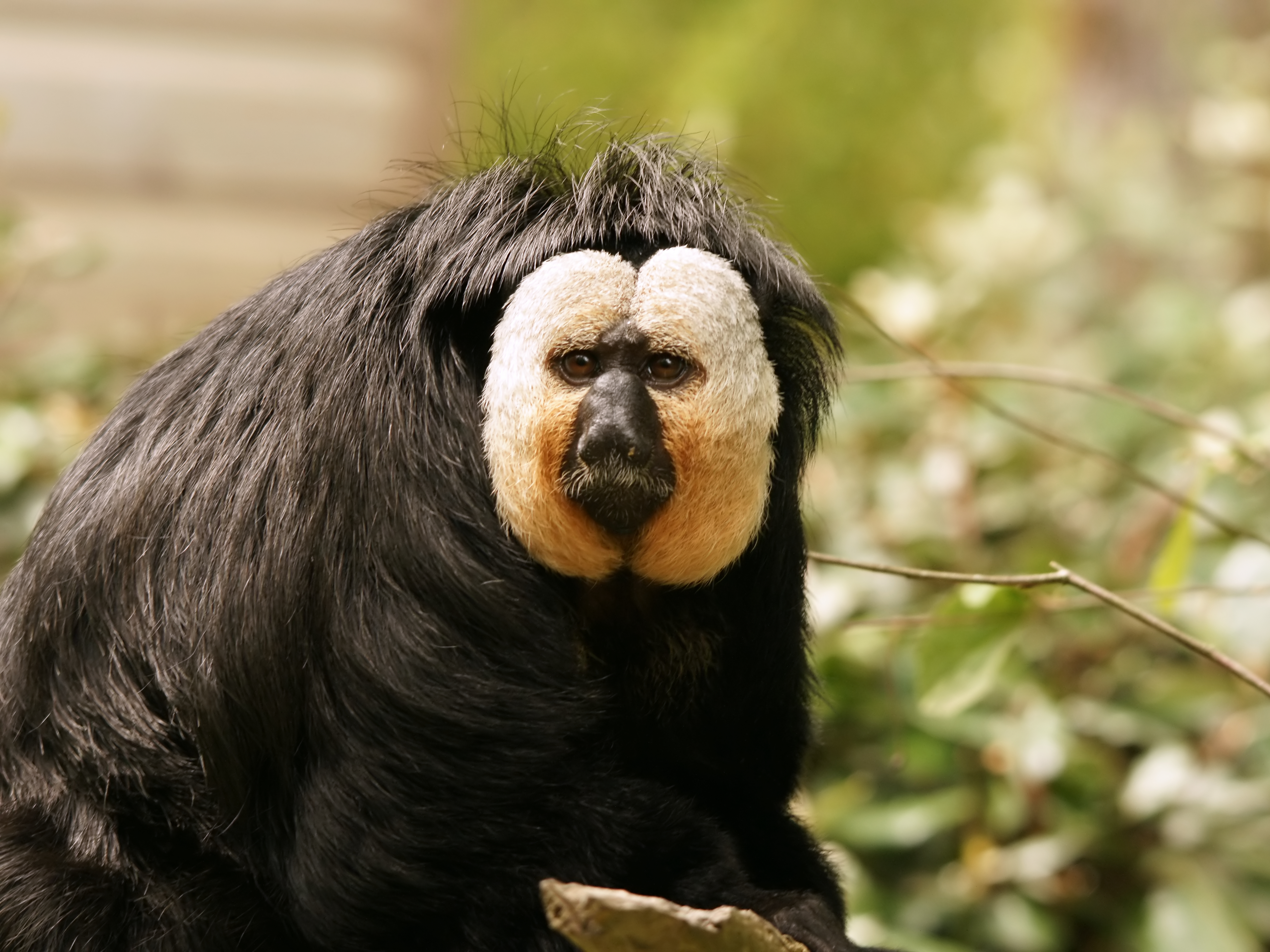
- White-faced saki (Pithecia pithecia)
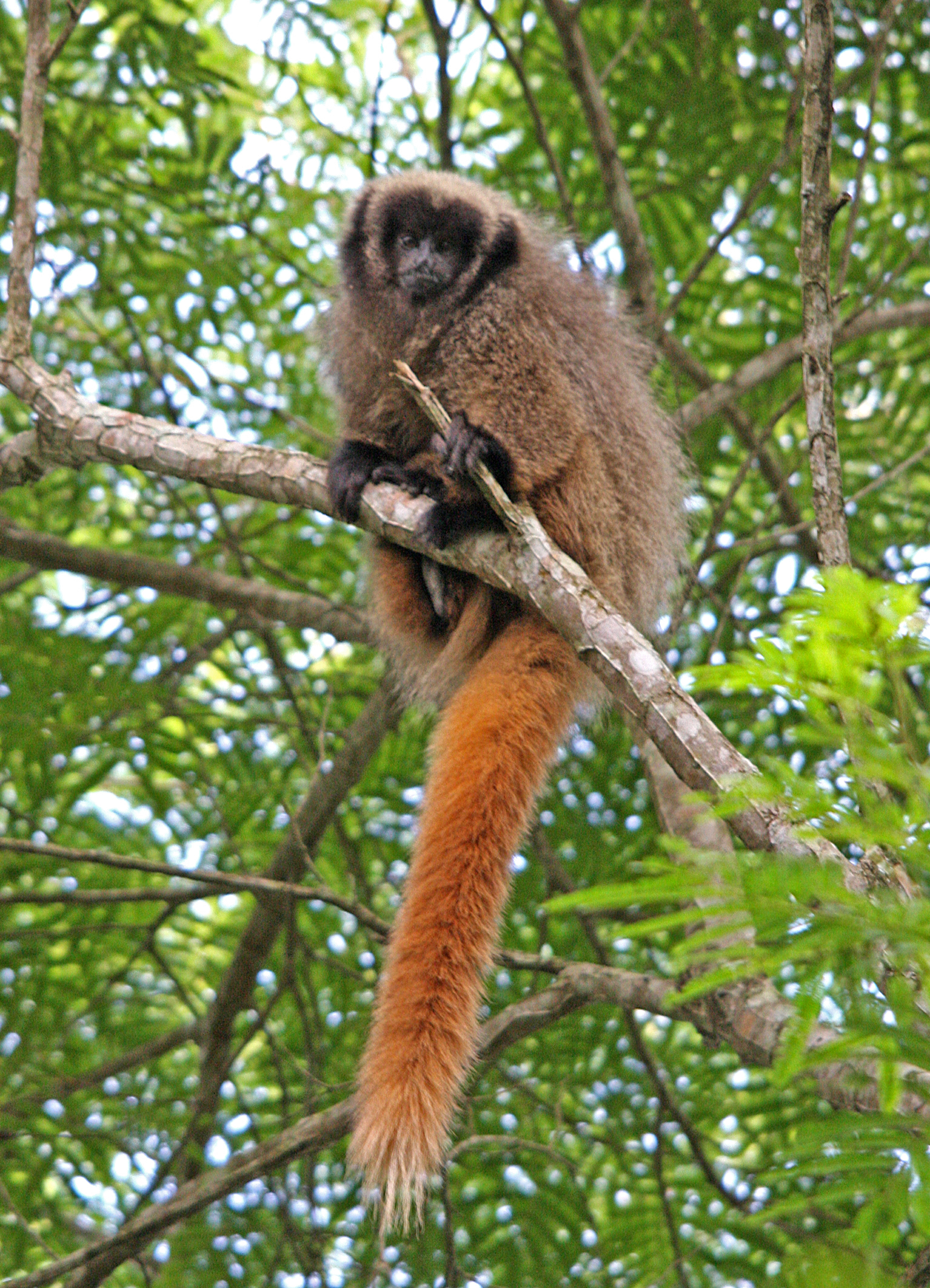
- Black-fronted titi (Callicebus nigrifrons)

Scientific classification
- Kingdom: Animalia
- Phylum: Chordata
- Class: Mammalia
- Order: Primates
- Parvorder: Platyrrhini
- Family: Pitheciidae; Mivart, 1865

Type genus
- Pithecia Desmarest, 1804

Genera (extant)
- Pithecia; Chiropotes; Cacajao; Plecturocebus; Cheracebus; Callicebus
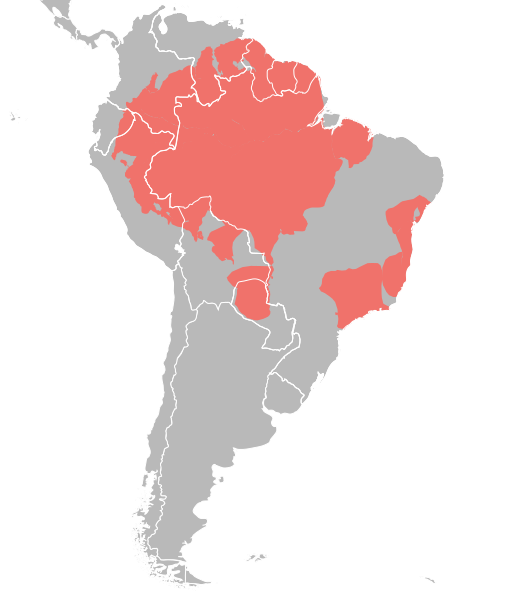
- Pitheciidae distribution

= Pitheciidae =

Pitheciidae Temporal range: Miocene to Present

Family of mammals

The Pitheciidae (/pɪθɪˈsaɪ.ɪdiː/) are one of the five families of New World monkeys now recognised. Formerly, they were included in the family Atelidae. The family includes the titis, saki monkeys and uakaris. Most species are native to the Amazon region of Brazil, with some being found from Colombia in the north to Bolivia in the south.

== Characteristics ==
Pitheciids are small to medium-sized monkeys, ranging from 23 cm in head-body length for the smaller titis, to 44–49 cm for the uakaris. They have medium to long fur, in a wide range of colors, often with contrasting patches, especially on the face.

They are diurnal and arboreal animals, found in tropical forests from low-lying swamp to mountain slopes. They are predominantly herbivorous, eating mostly fruit and seeds, although some species will also eat a small number of insects. Sakis and uakaris have a diastema between the canine and premolar teeth, but the titis, which have unusually small canines for New World monkeys, do not. All species have the dental formula: 2.1.3.32.1.3.3

Females give birth to a single young after a gestation period of between four and six months, depending on species. The uakaris and bearded sakis are polygamous, living in groups of 8-30 individuals. Each group has multiple males, which establish a dominance hierarchy amongst themselves. The titis and Pithecia sakis, by contrast, are monogamous and live in much smaller family groups.

== Classification ==
There are 54 currently recognized extant species of pitheciid monkey, grouped into two subfamilies and six genera. Eleven extinct genera known from the fossil record are placed in the family, extending the age of the family to the Miocene.

- Family Pitheciidae: titis, sakis and uakaris
  - Subfamily Callicebinae, titis
    - Genus Plecturocebus
      - White-eared titi, Plecturocebus donacophilus
      - Rio Beni titi, Plecturocebus modestus
      - Rio Mayo titi, Plecturocebus oenanthe
      - Ollala brothers's titi, Plecturocebus olallae
      - White-coated titi, Plecturocebus pallescens
      - Urubamba brown titi, Plecturocebus urubambensis
      - Baptista Lake titi, Plecturocebus baptista
      - Prince Bernhard's titi, Plecturocebus bernhardi
      - Brown titi, Plecturocebus brunneus
      - Parecis titi, Plecturocebus parecis
      - Ashy black titi, Plecturocebus cinerascens
      - Hoffmanns's titi, Plecturocebus hoffmannsi
      - Red-bellied titi, Plecturocebus moloch
      - Vieira's titi, Plecturocebus vieirai
      - Milton's titi, Plecturocebus miltoni
      - Chestnut-bellied titi, Plecturocebus caligatus
      - Coppery titi, Plecturocebus cupreus
      - Toppin's titi, Plecturocebus toppini
      - Madidi titi, Plecturocebus aureipalatii
      - Caquetá titi, Plecturocebus caquetensis
      - White-tailed titi, Plecturocebus discolor
      - Hershkovitz's titi, Plecturocebus dubius
      - Ornate titi, Plecturocebus ornatus
      - Stephen Nash's titi, Plecturocebus stephennashi
      - Alta Floresta titi, Plecturocebus grovesi
    - Genus Callicebus
      - Barbara Brown's titi, Callicebus barbarabrownae
      - Coimbra Filho's titi, Callicebus coimbrai
      - Coastal black-handed titi, Callicebus melanochir
      - Black-fronted titi, Callicebus nigrifrons
      - Atlantic titi, Callicebus personatus
    - Genus †Miocallicebus
      - †Miocallicebus villaviejai
    - Genus Cheracebus
      - Lucifer titi, Cheracebus lucifer
      - Black titi, Cheracebus lugens
      - Colombian black-handed titi, Cheracebus medemi
      - Red-headed titi, Cheracebus regulus
      - Collared titi, Cheracebus torquatus
    - Genus †Carlocebus
      - †Carlocebus carmenensis
      - †Carlocebus intermedius
    - Genus †Homunculus
      - †Homunculus patagonicus
  - Subfamily Pitheciinae
    - Genus Cacajao, uakaris
      - Black-headed uakari, Cacajao melanocephalus
      - Bald uakari, Cacajao calvus
      - Aracá uakari, Cacajao ayresii
      - Neblina uakari, Cacajao hosomi
    - Genus †Cebupithecia
      - †Cebupithecia sarmientoi
    - Genus Chiropotes, bearded sakis
      - Black bearded saki, Chiropotes satanas
      - Red-backed bearded saki, Chiropotes chiropotes
      - Brown-backed bearded saki, Chiropotes israelita
      - Uta Hick's bearded saki, Chiropotes utahickae
      - White-nosed saki, Chiropotes albinasus
    - Genus †Nuciruptor
      - †Nuciruptor rubricae
    - Genus †Mazzonicebus
      - †Mazzonicebus almendrae
    - Genus Pithecia, sakis
      - Equatorial saki, Pithecia aequatorialis
      - White-footed saki or buffy saki, Pithecia albicans
      - Cazuza's saki, Pithecia cazuzai
      - Golden-faced saki, Pithecia chrysocephala
      - Hairy saki, Pithecia hirsuta
      - Burnished saki, Pithecia inusta
      - Rio Tapajós saki or Gray's bald-faced saki, Pithecia irrorata
      - Isabel's saki, Pithecia isabela
      - Monk saki, Pithecia monachus
      - Miller's saki, Pithecia milleri
      - Mittermeier's Tapajós saki, Pithecia mittermeieri (disputed)
      - Napo saki, Pithecia napensis
      - Pissinatti's saki, Pithecia pissinattii (disputed)
      - White-faced saki, Pithecia pithecia
      - Rylands' bald-faced saki, Pithecia rylandsi (disputed)
      - Vanzolini's bald-faced saki, Pithecia vanzolinii
    - Genus †Proteropithecia
      - †Proteropithecia neuquenensis
    - Genus †Soriacebus
      - †Soriacebus ameghinorum
      - †Soriacebus adrianae
    - †Genus Xenothrix
      - †Jamaican monkey, Xenothrix mcgregori
    - †Genus Antillothrix
      - †Hispaniolan monkey, Antillothrix bernensis
    - †Genus Insulacebus
      - †Insulacebus toussentiana

*Newly described species. †Extinct taxa.

Silvestro etal 2017 showed the relationship among the extinct and extant pitheciid genera:

- stem Pitheciidae
  - stem Callicebinae
    - - Homunculus
      - Carlocebus
    - Callicebinae
      - Cheracebus
      - - Miocallicebus
        - - Callicebus
          - Plecturocebus
  - stem Pitheciinae
    - Xenothrini
      - Antillothrix
      - - Xenothrix
        - Insulacebus
    - Pitheciinae
      - Mazzonicebus
      - - - Nuciruptor
          - Soriacebus
        - - Pithecia
          - - Cebupithecia
            - - Proteropithecia
              - - Chiropotes
                - Cacajao
