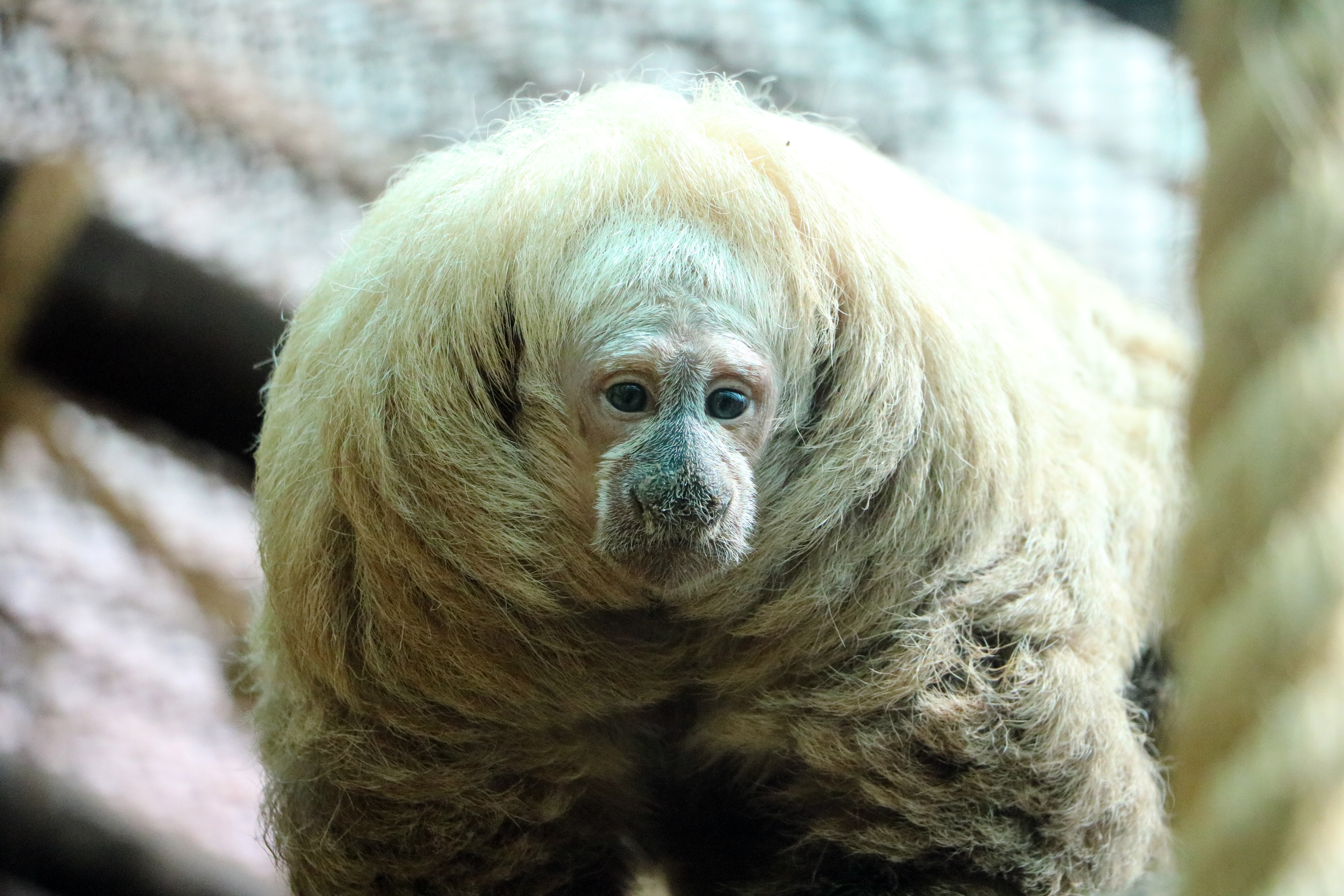

Conservation status
- Least Concern (IUCN 3.1)

Scientific classification
- Kingdom: Animalia
- Phylum: Chordata
- Class: Mammalia
- Infraclass: Placentalia
- Order: Primates
- Family: Pitheciidae
- Genus: Pithecia
- Species: P. albicans

Binomial name
- Pithecia albicans J. E. Gray, 1860
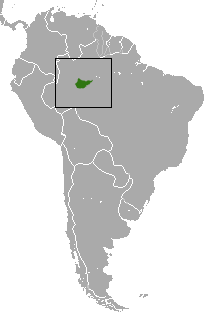
- White-footed saki range

= White-footed saki =

Species of New World monkey

The white-footed saki, buffy saki or white saki (Pithecia albicans) is a species of saki monkey, a type of New World monkey, endemic to western Brazil south of the Amazon.
