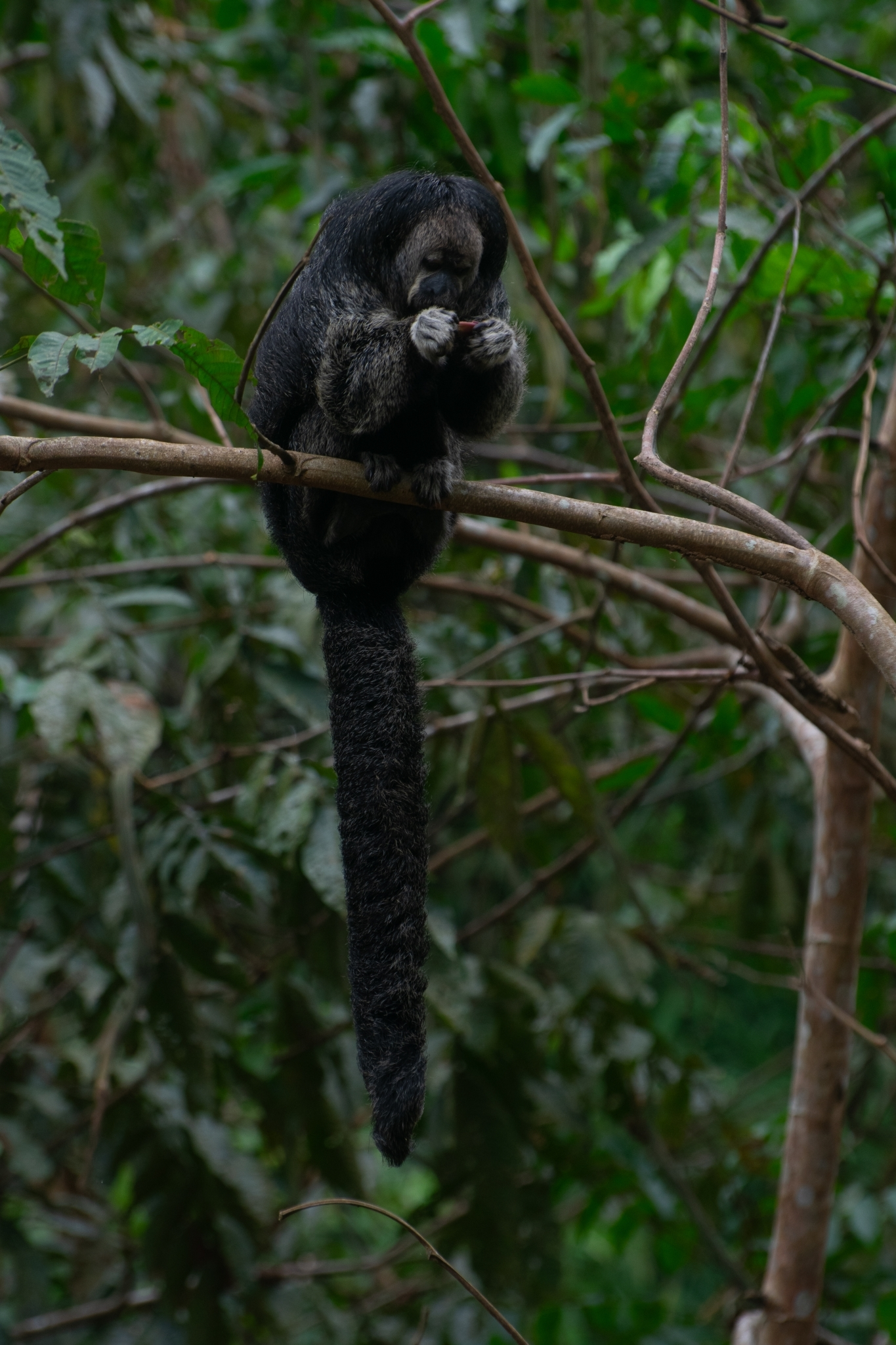

Conservation status
- Least Concern (IUCN 3.1)

Scientific classification
- Kingdom: Animalia
- Phylum: Chordata
- Class: Mammalia
- Order: Primates
- Family: Pitheciidae
- Genus: Pithecia
- Species: P. monachus

Binomial name
- Pithecia monachus (É. Geoffroy, 1812)
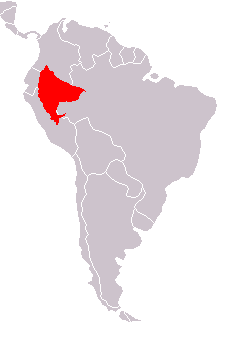
- Approximate range of the monk saki (includes P. hirsuta, P. monachus, P. inusta, and P. milleri)

= Monk saki =

Species of New World monkey

The monk saki (Pithecia monachus) also known as Geoffroy's monk saki, is a species of saki monkey, a type of New World monkey, from South America. It is found in forested areas of northwestern Brazil and northeastern Peru.

== Taxonomy ==
The hairy saki (P. hirsuta), Miller's saki (P. milleri), Napo saki (P. napensis), and burnished saki (P. inusta) were previously considered conspecific but were split from this species in 2014. P. monachus is now known to occupy a much smaller range than it was thought to before the split.

== Distribution ==
This species is found in the interfluvial between the Solimoes River, lower to middle Ucayali River and lower Javary River, in northwestern Brazil and northeastern Peru.

== Description ==
This monkey can grow up to be 30 to 50 centimetres (12 to 20 in) long and weigh about 1 to 2 kilograms (2 lb 3 oz to 4 lb 7 oz), approximately the same as a large rabbit. The thick, bushy tail can be up to 25 to 55 centimetres (10 to 22 in) long. It has coarse fur, which is long and shaggy around the face and neck.

== Behavior ==
A shy, wary animal, it is totally arboreal, living high in the trees and sometimes descending to lower levels but not to the ground. It generally moves on all fours but may sometimes walk upright on a large branch and will leap across gaps. During the day, it moves in pairs or small family groups, feeding on fruits, berries, honey, some leaves, small mammals such as mice and bats, and birds. The female gives birth to 1 young per mating season with the average family size being 4.5.
