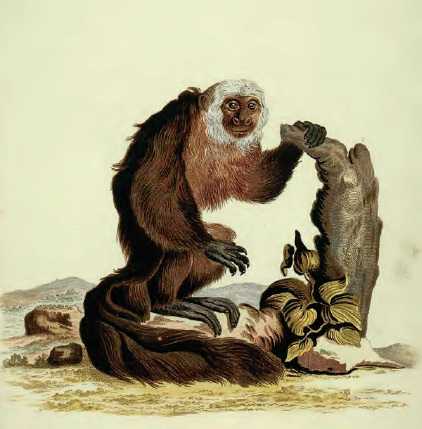

Conservation status
- Least Concern (IUCN 3.1)

Scientific classification
- Kingdom: Animalia
- Phylum: Chordata
- Class: Mammalia
- Order: Primates
- Family: Pitheciidae
- Genus: Pithecia
- Species: P. aequatorialis

Binomial name
- Pithecia aequatorialis Hershkovitz, 1987
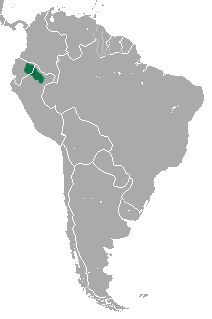

= Equatorial saki =

Species of New World monkey

The equatorial saki (Pithecia aequatorialis), also called the red-bearded saki, is a species of saki monkey, a type of New World monkey. It is found in northeastern Peru and Ecuador.

Not much is known about the equatorial saki, its range being specifically unknown.

== Description ==
The equatorial saki weighs between 2 - 2.5 kg, has a head-body length of 39 – 44 cm, and a tail length of 45 – 47 cm. The species' tail in not prehensile, relying on its arm and leg strength to carry itself from branch to branch. The equatorial saki is also sexually dimorphic. It is often confused for the monk saki, but the reddish throat and chest of the equatorial saki set it apart.

== Ecology ==
The equatorial saki is diurnal. The species is frugivorous, but seeds and nuts constitute a large part of diet. This species also consumes leaves and insects, especially ants. The fruits that this species consumes have hard pericarps. Most of its time is spent foraging in the middle to upper levels of the rainforest canopy.

They seem to be found most commonly in riverside, seasonally flooded and swamp forests, but have been seen in terra firme forests as well.

The red-bearded saki moves through the forest both quadrupedally and by leaping. When the red-bearded saki takes off from a tree branch, most likely it does this from a vertical clinging position.

The equatorial saki lives in small groups of two to four that come together to form larger congregations. Groups of red-bearded sakis are described as closed social units. Males groom their young.
