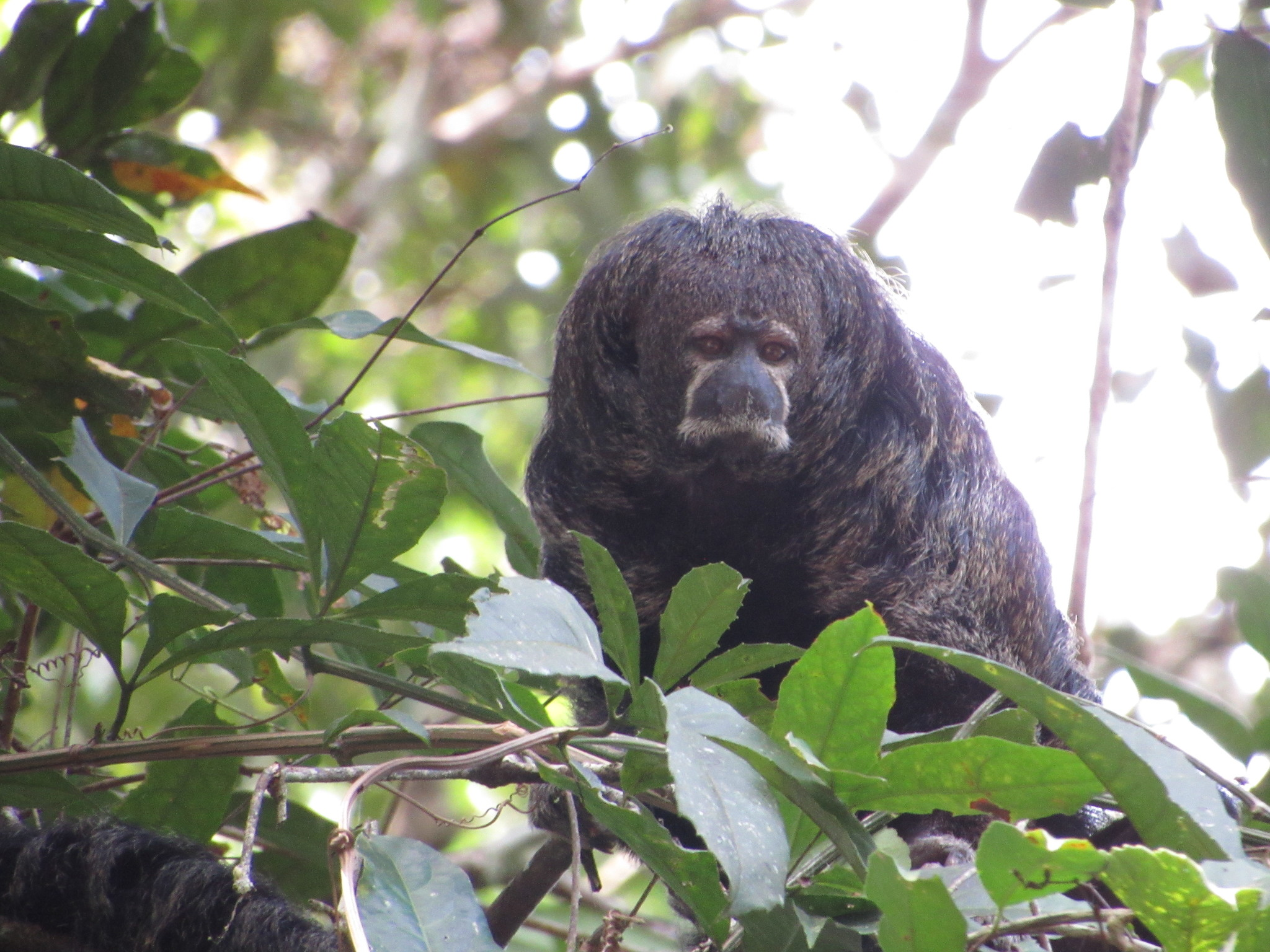

Conservation status
- Vulnerable (IUCN 3.1)

Scientific classification
- Kingdom: Animalia
- Phylum: Chordata
- Class: Mammalia
- Infraclass: Placentalia
- Order: Primates
- Family: Pitheciidae
- Genus: Pithecia
- Species: P. milleri

Binomial name
- Pithecia milleri J. A. Allen, 1914

= Miller's saki =

Species of South American monkey

Miller's saki (Pithecia milleri), also known as Miller's monk saki, is a species of saki monkey, a type of New World monkey. Its range includes parts of southwestern Colombia, northeastern Ecuador, and perhaps adjacent areas in Peru. This species was originally described as a species by J. A. Allen, demoted to a subspecies of the monk saki (P. monachus) in 1987, and raised back to full species status in 2014. Confusion over the taxonomy of saki monkeys has arisen in part due to poorly labeled or mislabeled museum specimens. Males and females of this species, like those of other sakis, have differently colored pelage, with the females being more grayish in the face and overall, and the males a darker, grizzled black but with brown in the face and forearms.
