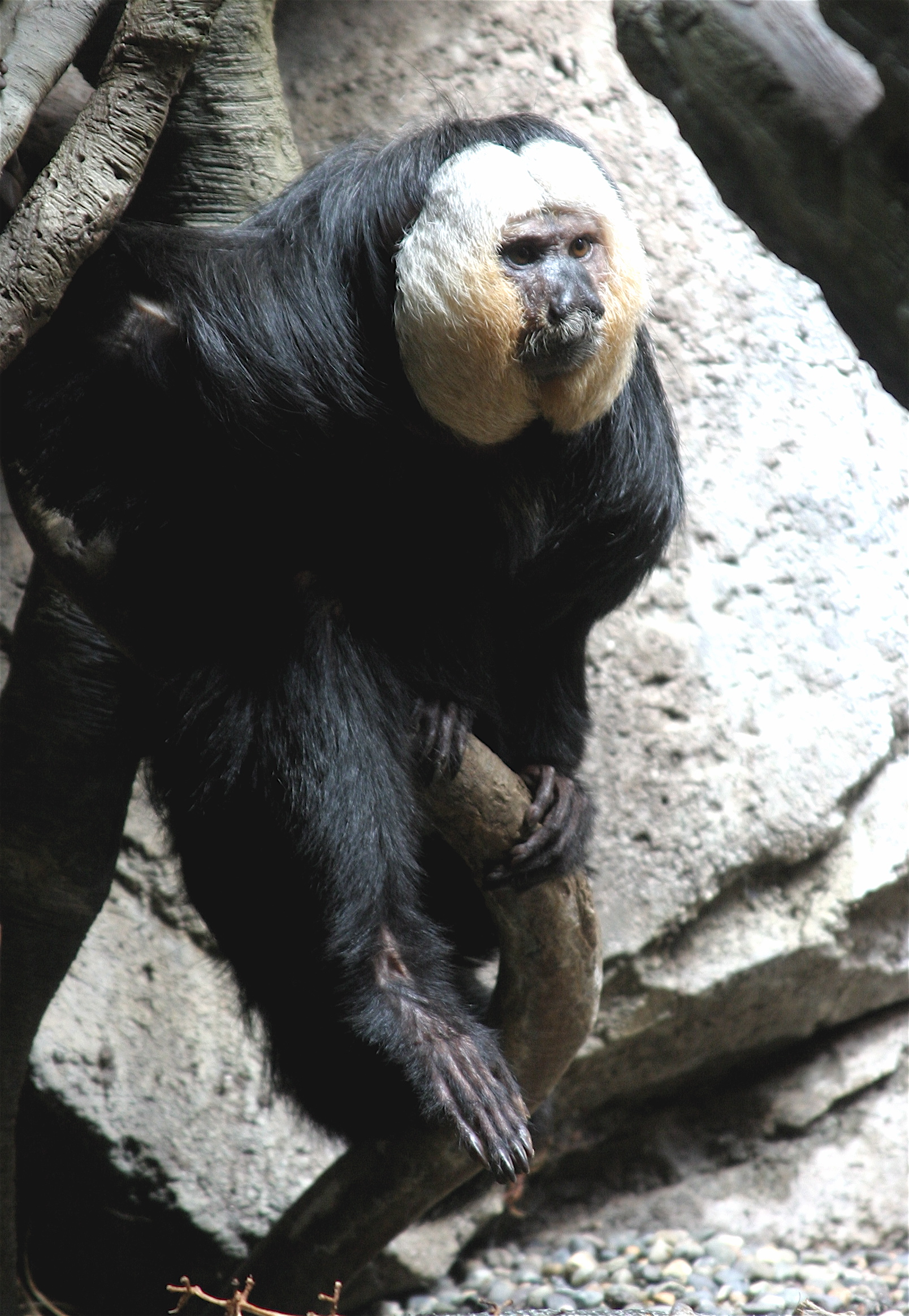
- White-faced saki (Pithecia pithecia)

Scientific classification
- Kingdom: Animalia
- Phylum: Chordata
- Class: Mammalia
- Order: Primates
- Family: Pitheciidae
- Subfamily: Pitheciinae
- Genus: Pithecia; Desmarest, 1804

Type species
- Simia pithecia Linnaeus, 1766

Species
- Pithecia aequatorialis; Pithecia albicans; Pithecia cazuzai; Pithecia chrysocephala; Pithecia hirsuta; Pithecia inusta; Pithecia irrorata; Pithecia isabela; Pithecia milleri; ?Pithecia mittermeieri; Pithecia monachus; Pithecia napensis; ?Pithecia pissinattii; Pithecia pithecia; ?Pithecia rylandsi; Pithecia vanzolinii

= Saki monkey =

Sakis

Genus of New World monkeys

Sakis, or saki monkeys, are any of several New World monkeys of the genus Pithecia. They are closely related to the bearded sakis of genus Chiropotes.

== Range ==
Sakis' range includes northern and central South America, extending from the south of Colombia, over Peru, in northern Bolivia, and into the central part of Brazil.

== Body functionality ==
Sakis are small-sized monkeys with long, bushy tails. Their furry, rough skin is black, grey or reddish-brown in color depending upon the species. The faces of some species are naked, but their head is hooded with fur. Their bodies are adapted to life in the trees, with strong hind legs allowing them to make far jumps. Sakis reach a length of 30 to 50 cm, with a tail just as long, and weigh up to 2 kg.

== Habitat and habit ==
Sakis are diurnal animals. They live in the trees of the rain forests and only occasionally go onto the land. They mostly move on all fours, sometimes running in an upright position on the hind legs over the branches, and sometimes jumping long distances. For sleeping they roll themselves cat-like in the branches. They are generally very shy, cautious animals. Sakis allow adult offspring and non-related immigrants into their groups unlike titi or owl monkeys. Saki monkeys have been commonly considered to be socially monogamous, but generally only sakis who are pair-living exhibit social monogamy. Females primarily carry infants and male-infant interactions are rare.

== Diet ==
Sakis are frugivores. Their diet consists of over 90% fruit and is supplemented by a small proportion of leaves, flowers, and insects. Sakis, as well as uakaris, engage in a specialized form of frugivory in which they focus specifically on unripe fruits and seeds.

== Procreation ==
Mating is non-seasonal, and can happen any time during the year. After approximately 150- to 180-day gestation, females bear single young. The young are weaned after 4 months, and are fully mature in 3 years. Their life expectancy is up to 30 years.

== Classification ==
- Genus Pithecia
  - Equatorial saki, Pithecia aequatorialis
  - White-footed saki or buffy saki, Pithecia albicans
  - Cazuza's saki, Pithecia cazuzai
  - Golden-faced saki, Pithecia chrysocephala
  - Hairy saki, Pithecia hirsuta
  - Burnished saki, Pithecia inusta
  - Rio Tapajós saki or Gray's bald-faced saki, Pithecia irrorata
  - Isabel's saki, Pithecia isabela
  - Monk saki, Pithecia monachus
  - Miller's saki, Pithecia milleri
  - Mittermeier's Tapajós saki, Pithecia mittermeieri (disputed)
  - Napo saki, Pithecia napensis
  - Pissinatti's saki, Pithecia pissinattii (disputed)
  - White-faced saki, Pithecia pithecia
  - Rylands' bald-faced saki, Pithecia rylandsi (disputed)
  - Vanzolini's bald-faced saki, Pithecia vanzolinii
