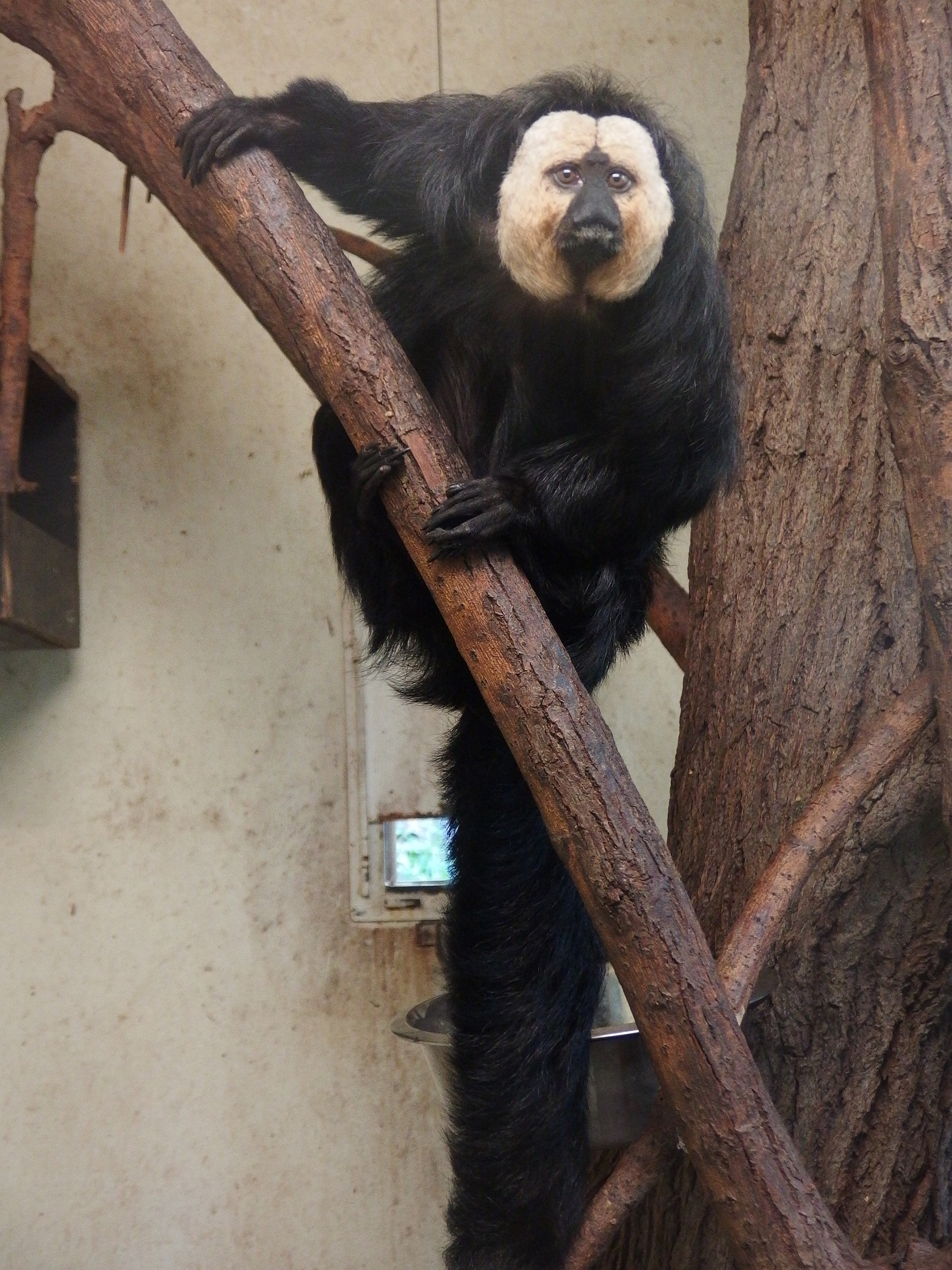
- Male at Plzeň Zoo
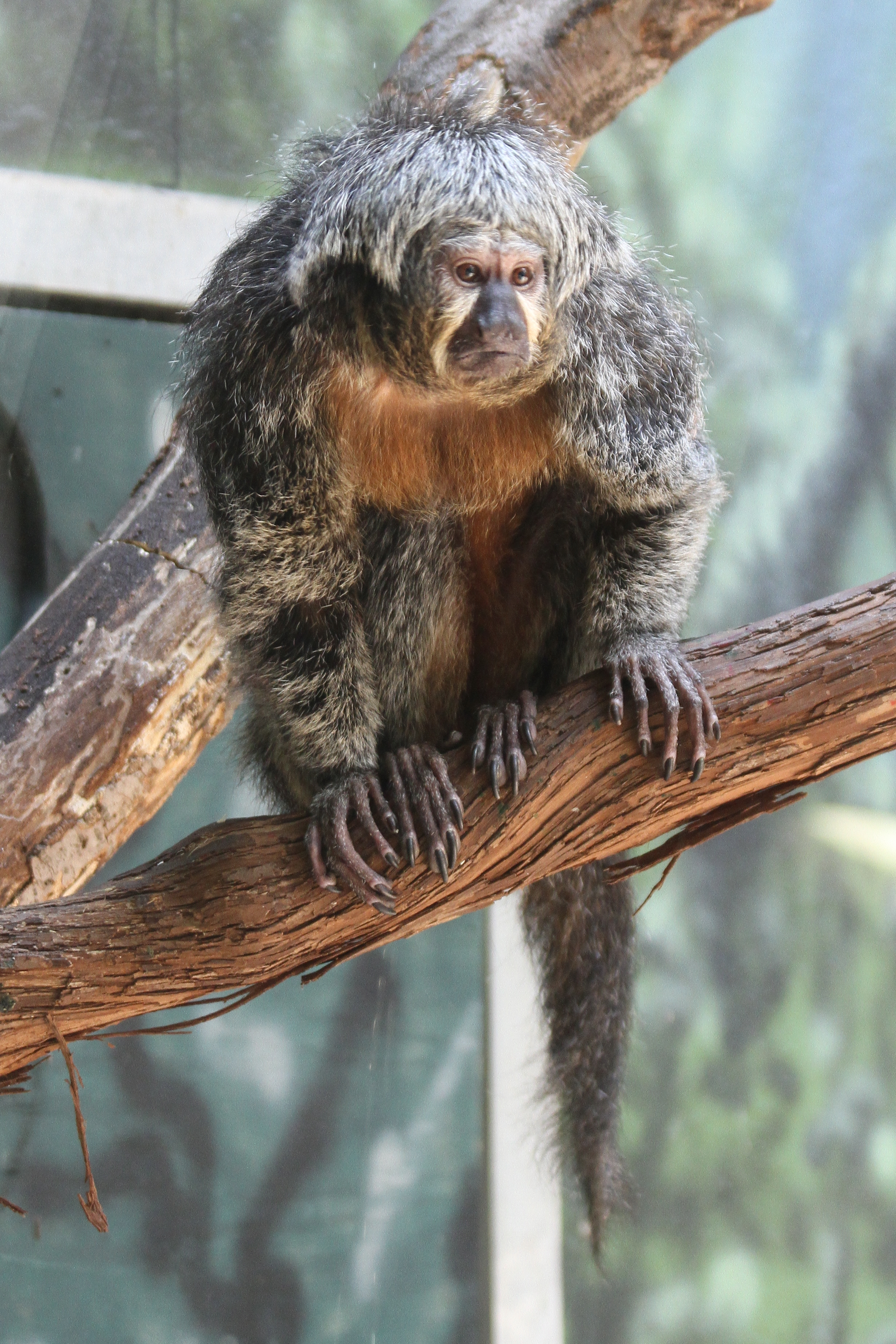
- Female at Philadelphia Zoo

Conservation status
- Least Concern (IUCN 3.1)

Scientific classification
- Kingdom: Animalia
- Phylum: Chordata
- Class: Mammalia
- Order: Primates
- Family: Pitheciidae
- Genus: Pithecia
- Species: P. pithecia

Binomial name
- Pithecia pithecia (Linnaeus, 1766)
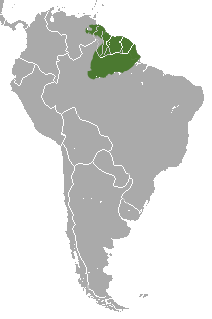
- White-faced saki range

Synonyms
- Pithecia pithecia ssp. pithecia (Linnaeus, 1766); Simia pithecia (Linnaeus, 1766)

= White-faced saki =

Species of monkey

The white-faced saki (Pithecia pithecia), is a species of New World saki monkey. The small bodied neotropical primate can be found in Brazil, French Guiana, Guyana, Suriname, and Venezuela. This species feeds mostly on fruits, nuts, seeds, and insects. Although it is an arboreal species and is a specialist of brachiation, it is also terrestrial when foraging. Typical life expectancy is around 14 years in its natural habitat, although individuals have been recorded to live up to 36 years in captivity. The white faced saki is active in the day and sleeps highly elevated (15–20 m (49–66 ft)) in trees with many leaves to shelter from weather and flying predators.

A formerly recognized subspecies, P. p. chrysocephala, was elevated to full species status as P. chrysocephala in 2014.

== Reproduction and sexual dimorphism ==
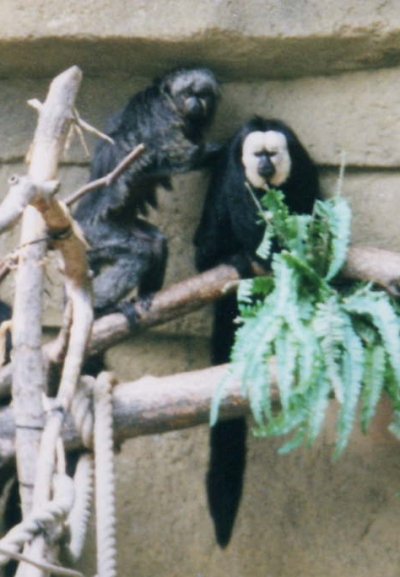
Female (left) and male P. pithecia, illustrating sexual dimorphism in coat coloration

Pairs of white-faced saki only breed once a year, but do not breed seasonally. Estimated typical breeding season is through August and September, but white-faced sakis have been observed breeding in March, April, and June. Breedings are typically not private and are sometimes even done with other group members watching. Regardless of when or how reproduction occurs, a white-faced saki female only gives birth to one offspring at a time. Peak birth months typically occur between February and June. In captivity, female white-faced sakis experience ovarian cycles of approximately 17 days, and a gestational period of 20–21 weeks. Following birth, the mother undergoes a period of lactationally-induced infertility lasting 23 weeks on average. Once an infant is born, the father spends a great deal of time around it and the mother, likely to protect the two from predators. During this time the mother grooms and takes care of its offspring until it becomes independent. Male paternal care on the other hand does not exist at all. Once it is independent, the offspring usually stays and contributes as a member of the group it was born in. Mature females that are still housed by their parents do not participate in reproduction. White-faced saki practice both monogamy and polygamy, and are defensive when it comes to keeping other groups away from their females. As such, there are only two objectives to the white-faced saki mating system: 1) exclude outsider groups from accessing their females and 2) reduce competition within the group over females.

White-faced sakis display noticeable sexual dimorphism in coloration. Females have shorter hair than males, with brownish-grey fur and white or pale brown stripes around the corners of the nose and mouth. Males, on the other hand, have blacker fur, with a reddish-white forehead, face, and throat. Their faces are much whiter than those of females. When compared in size, there is little to no difference between a male and a female white-faced saki. In the species, both genders have relatively small bodies with males typically weighing in around 1.73 kg (3.8 lb) and females weighing in around 1.52 kg (3.4 lb). In terms of hierarchy, males are clearly favored within the group and its social bonds. Typically, the oldest male is the most dominant in a group. Young saki males are often identified as females because of their sometimes "grizzling" dorsal hair and orangish bellies. It is at approximately 2 months of age when males and females begin to show differences, although it gradually becomes obvious over a few years.

== Behavior and social bonds ==
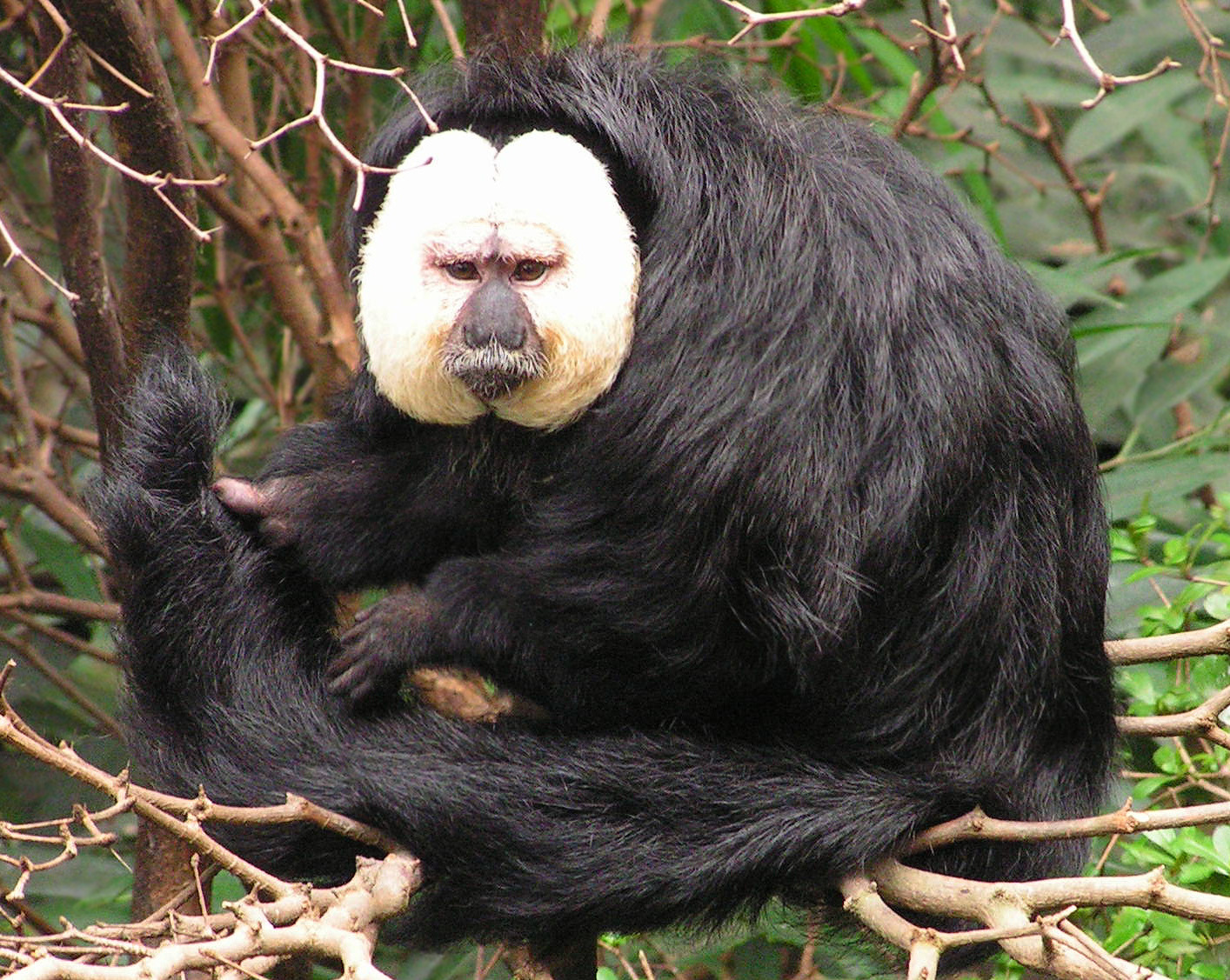
At Dallas World Aquarium Dallas, Texas

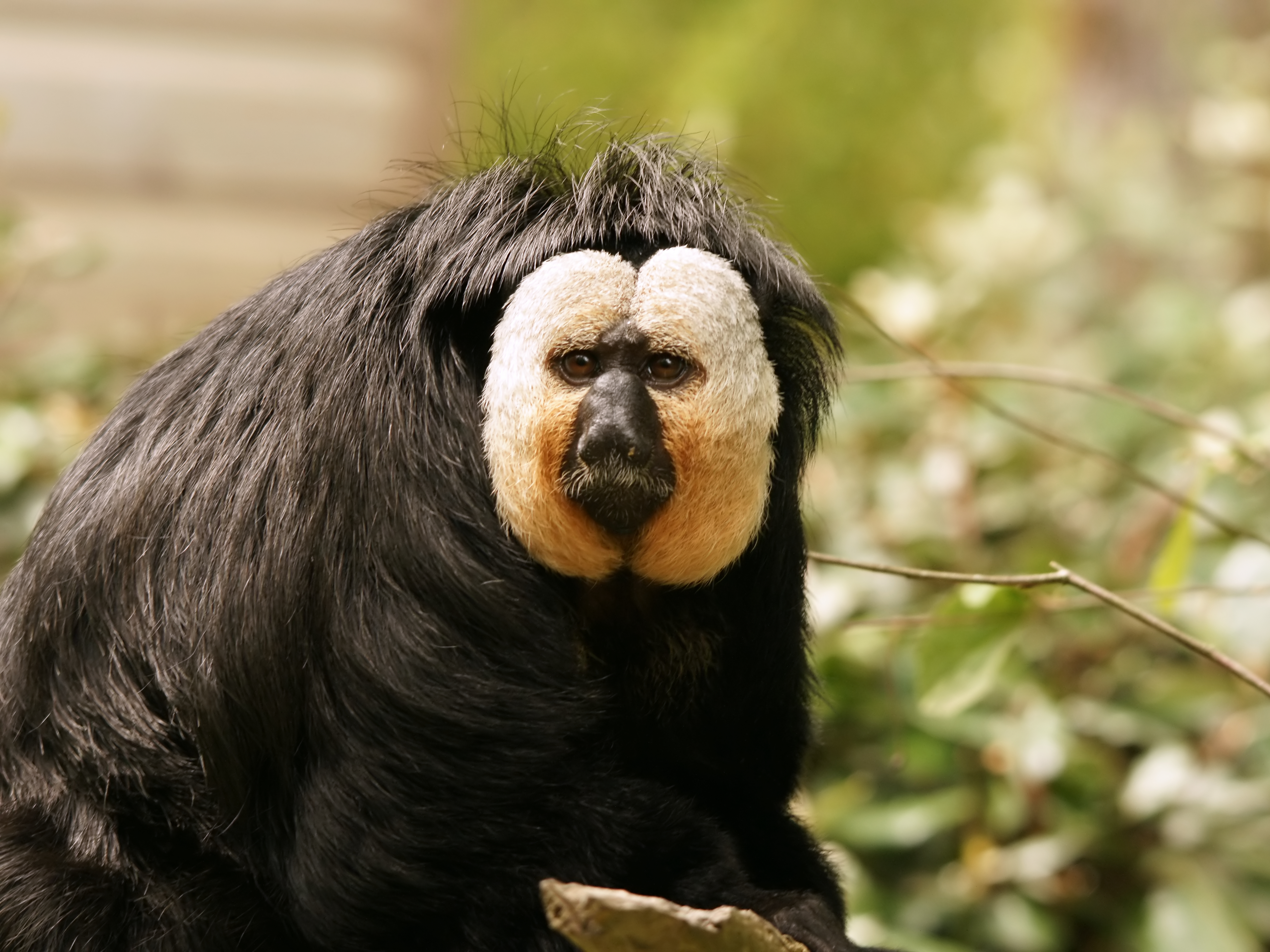
In La Vallée des Singes at Romagne, Vienne, France.

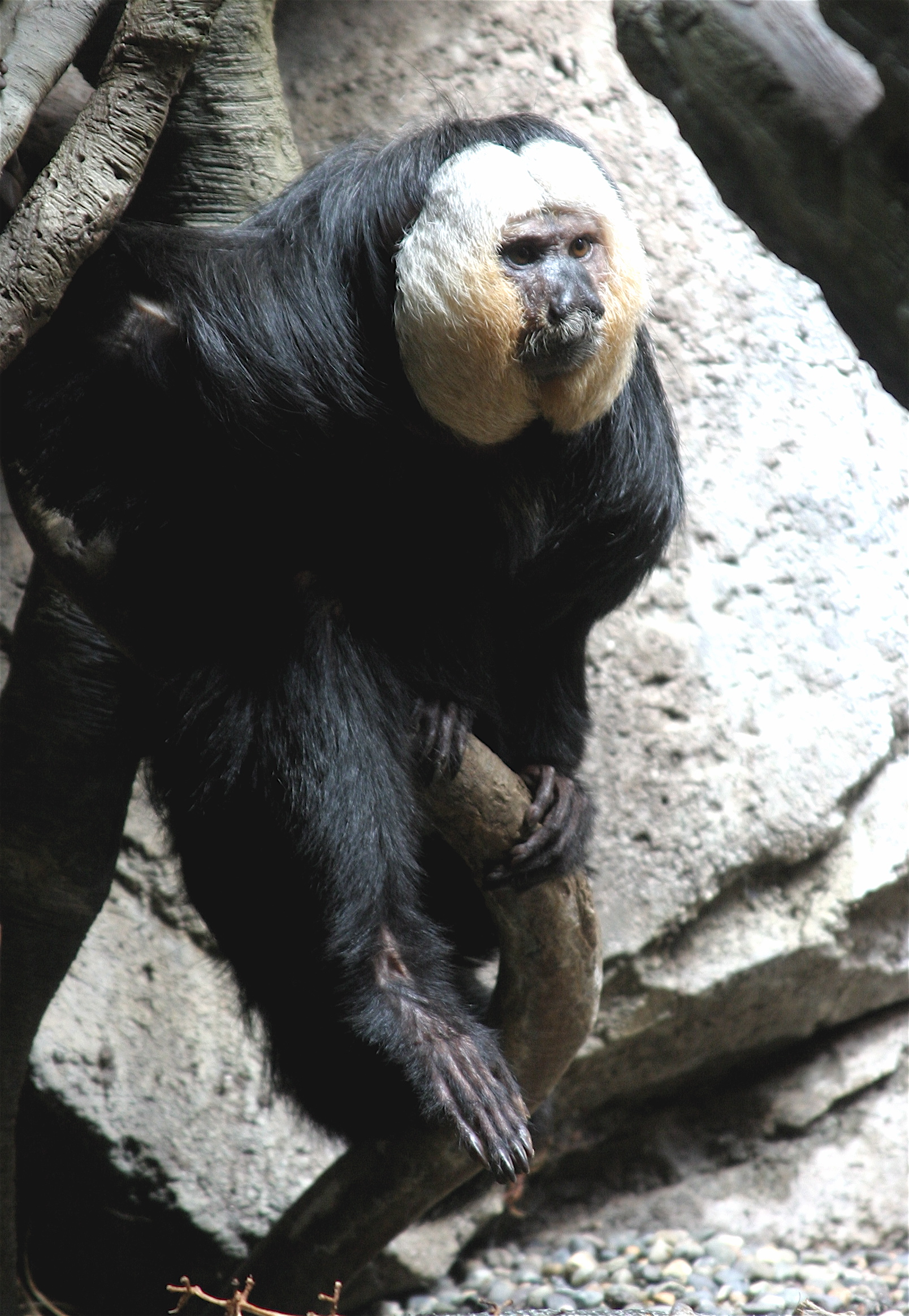
In Oregon Zoo at Portland, Oregon.

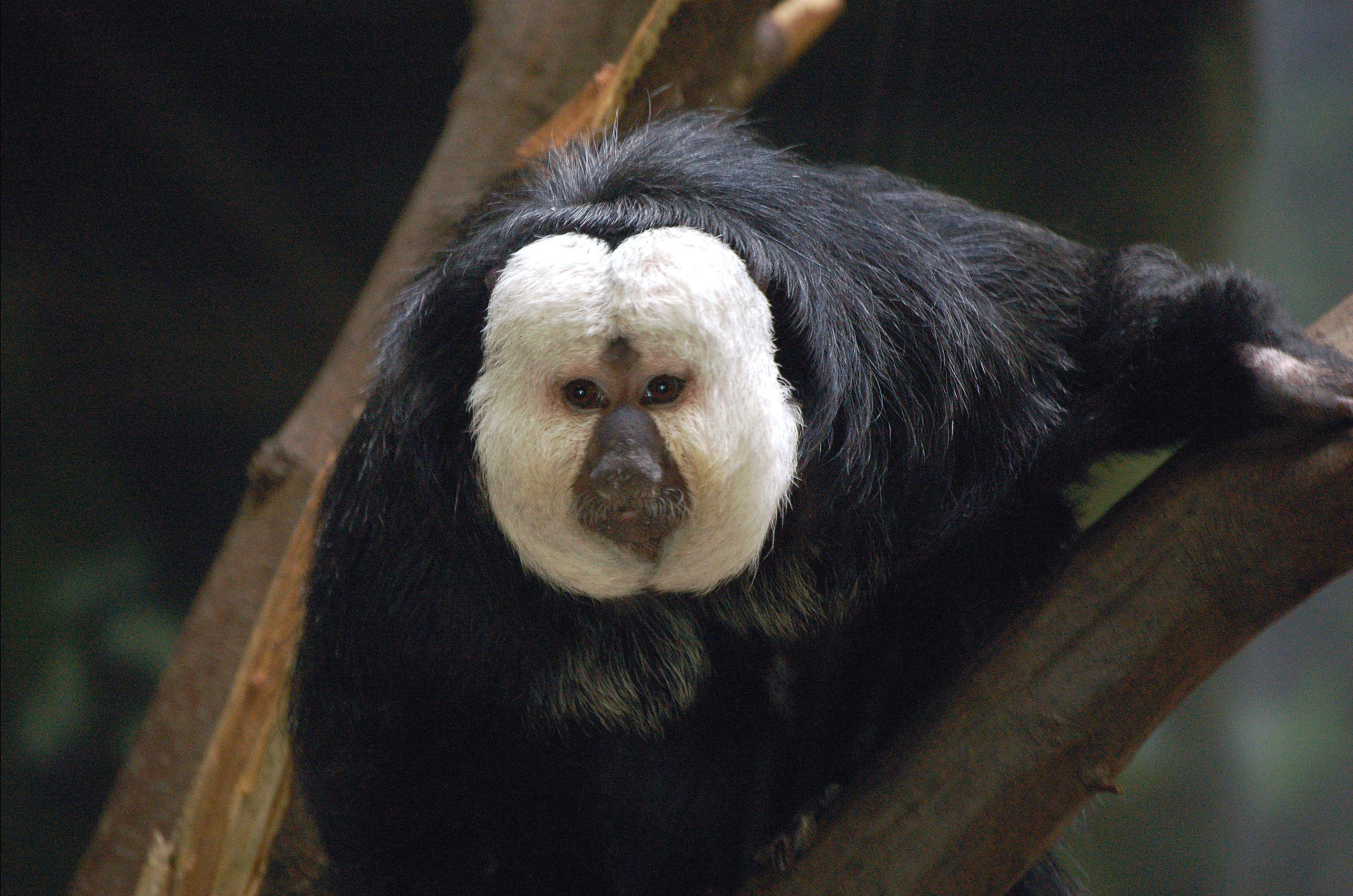
At Philadelphia Zoo

The white-faced saki typically exhibits shy behavior. It is most active during the early morning and mid-afternoon, and can be found in the understory and lower canopy of the rainforest. Males are usually more active than females. At night, the white-faced saki typically migrates up hills to higher altitudes to sleep near the tops of trees. It typically changes its sleeping site every night except on rare occasions. The white-faced saki separates themselves into small family-like groups. A South American study shows that groups can range from 2-12 group members, with higher numbers typically occurring (but not exclusively) in Guyana. Most widespread observations conclude that the white-faced saki travels in small groups of 2 and 3, which usually is made up of the bonded parents and their offspring. It is believed that it practices both monogamy and polygamy. It is uncertain which one is practiced more, but single male and single female white-faced saki bonds are the strongest bonds witnessed within the groups. The white-faced saki typically strengthens and demonstrates this bond through grooming. However, only the females groom males, and the males do not reciprocate. This practice occurs less frequently after an infant is born. As the child becomes more independent, the father and mother spend less time together, and the mother grooms the father less. Male-male bonds between white-faced saki are the weakest. When polygamy is practiced within groups, competition between members can arise. In some cases, members may even interrupt one another while reproduction is occurring. These conflicts that occur within groups are nowhere near as intense as the conflicts that occur between two different groups. White-faced sakis are typically peaceful when in the presence of other species of primates, but when in the presence of a different group of white-faced sakis, they become very hostile. These encounters usually lead to standoffs and loud calls between groups. At times these standoffs can even lead to white-faced sakis chasing one another from tree to tree, causing deaths of some participants who have fallen out of a tree. The reason behind this hostile behavior between groups is usually over access to females. White-faced sakis want to keep access to females exclusive to their group. However, altercations between groups can also occur over resources and food. Even though groups are typically hostile to white-faced sakis outside the group, they do sometimes allow immigrant white-faced sakis to become members of the group.

== Locomotion ==
The white-faced saki differs from many other primates including its close relative, Chiropotes satanas, in that it is predominantly a leaper. The white-faced saki is considered one of the greatest leapers of neotropical primates. It is so good at leaping that it was given the nickname "mono volador" (flying monkey). The white-faced saki's skeleton accounts for their skill with its many morphologies associated with leaping. Its long hind limbs allow it to propel itself from tree to tree. Between leaps, the white-faced saki uses its average length forelimbs to make a series of rapid hand holds that allow it to pull itself and change direction. It is considered to be an awkward quadrupedal walker and runner. The white-faced saki rarely uses any suspensory behavior like other primates and usually eats in a seated or clinging position. Leaping accounts for over 70% of white-faced saki locomotion behavior. Quadrupedal walking/running accounts for 25% of locomotive behavior, while climbing accounted for the remaining 5%.

== Diet ==
This picky primate travels distances of 0.5 to 1.25 mi (0.8 to 2.0 km) in search of food or other resources. The white-faced saki has a mixed diet of fruits, leaves, seeds, flowers, insects, honey, and small animals. It is primarily a seed predator, with 60% or more of its diet consisting of seeds. As such, its average monthly intake of lipids is extremely high compared to other fruit consuming animals. Its lipid intake is 4 times higher than other frugivores. Its protein intake is 2-3 times lower, and its fiber intake is slightly higher than other frugivores. Its specialized dental anatomy consisting of large canines allows it to bite into and open up hard or protected fruit. It normally consumes the seeds of unripe/immature fruit. When it does eat the flesh of fruit, it comes from ripe/mature fruit. After seeds, young leaves are the second most important food resource to the white-faced saki. In a Venezuelan study, researchers placed out two groups of leaves. One group included young immature leaves, and the other group included developed mature leaves. At the end of the study, it was observed that the white-faced saki only ate out of the group of young leaves and did not or rarely ate out of the group of mature leaves. In the same study, it was also established that the white-faced saki eats insects more regularly during the wet seasons of the rainforest. On other occasions, the white-faced saki has been observed crawling into hollow portions of trees and eating bats where they roost. It typically get most of its protein from immature fruit seeds, and its lipids from ripe fruit. It also eats a variety of mature drupes that give it its free simple sugars and fiber. There is little variation in its sources of protein and sugars, but there is great variation in where it gets its lipids.

== Predation ==
If a predator is near, alarm calls, which have been observed to last from 1.2 to 88 minutes, will be sounded by an initial white-faced saki and then continually echoed by others to spread the warning. They will then puff their bodies up and stomp their feet on the ground or trees in an attempt to intimidate the threat. They are small primates and dwell in the branches of trees, so one of their biggest predator threats are large birds such as hawks and harpy eagles. In the face of danger, the white-faced saki will emit warning calls to others or freeze if in the canopy in an attempt to move down where it is out of sight. The predator response of the white-face saki is based on what type of threat they are facing: if it is a smaller, easily overpowered threat, the group will participate in a behavior called "mobbing" to scare the predator away, but if the threat is larger, such as an eagle, they will refrain from warning calls and descend out of sight into the lower canopy. Other terrestrial and aquatic predators include tayras, jaguars, pumas, green anacondas, ocelots, red-tailed boas, and even large mustelids, which are usually threats to the young and elderly.
