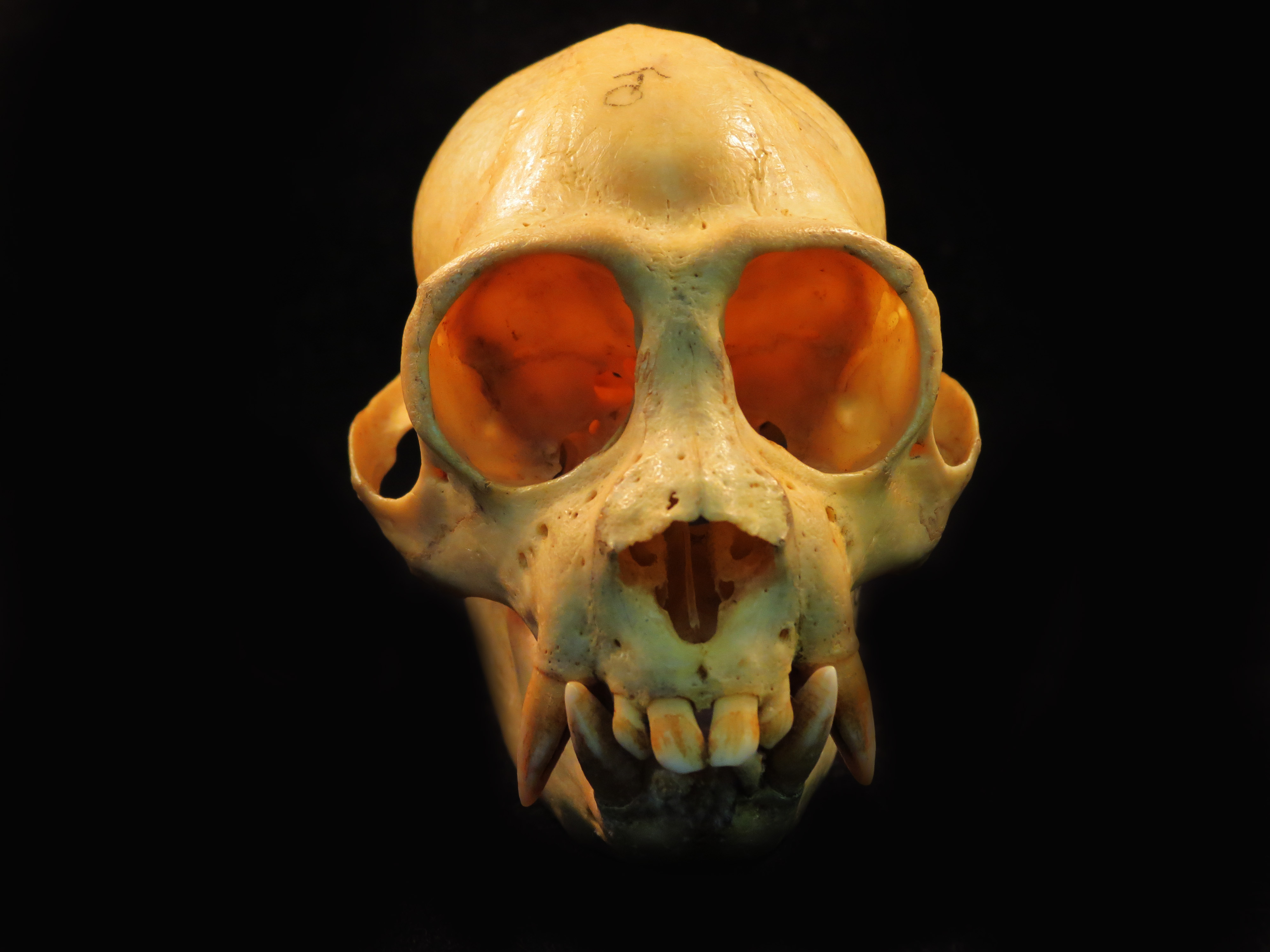
- Pithecia skull frontal view

Conservation status
- Data Deficient (IUCN 3.1)

Scientific classification
- Kingdom: Animalia
- Phylum: Chordata
- Class: Mammalia
- Order: Primates
- Family: Pitheciidae
- Genus: Pithecia
- Species: P. vanzolinii

Binomial name
- Pithecia vanzolinii Hershkovitz, 1987

= Vanzolini's bald-faced saki =

Species of New World monkey

Vanzolini's bald-faced saki (Pithecia vanzolinii) is a species of saki monkey, a type of New World monkey. Its range is in western Brazil. The monkey is named after Brazilian zoologist Paulo Vanzolini. This species was originally described by Hershkovitz as the subspecies Pithecia irrorata vanzolinii based on individuals collected in 1936 by Alfonso M. Olalla, but it was raised to full species status in 2014. For many years, there had been no record of the species in nature. Further specimens were collected in 1956 by Fernando Novaes (the then director of the Goeldi Museum in Pará) and his assistant Miguel Moreira. The mammals in this expedition were collected alive and prepared as museum specimens, as described by Cory T. Carvalho, the mammalogist working at the Goeldi museum at the time.

After 61 years, in 2017, one individual was collected after being hunted for bush meat in an extractive community in the state of Acre, Brazil. After not being seen alive for more than 60 years, as F. Novaes and M. Moreira collected specimens in 1956, an individual was photographed in the wild in August 2017.

In January-February 2017, an expedition surveyed for large mammals, with a focus on primates, along the Eiru River and Igarapé Preto in Amazonas. P. vanzolinii was found on both sides of the Eiru River, from the mouth of the Juruá River upriver to the Terrra Indigena Rio Eiru. In total 21 sightings of 12 groups, with 2-5 individuals per group, and a total of 34 individuals, were made. One voucher specimen was collected of an adult male, which is held in the mammal collection at Mamirauá Institute for Sustainable Development. The hunting of sakis by locals may threaten their survival.
