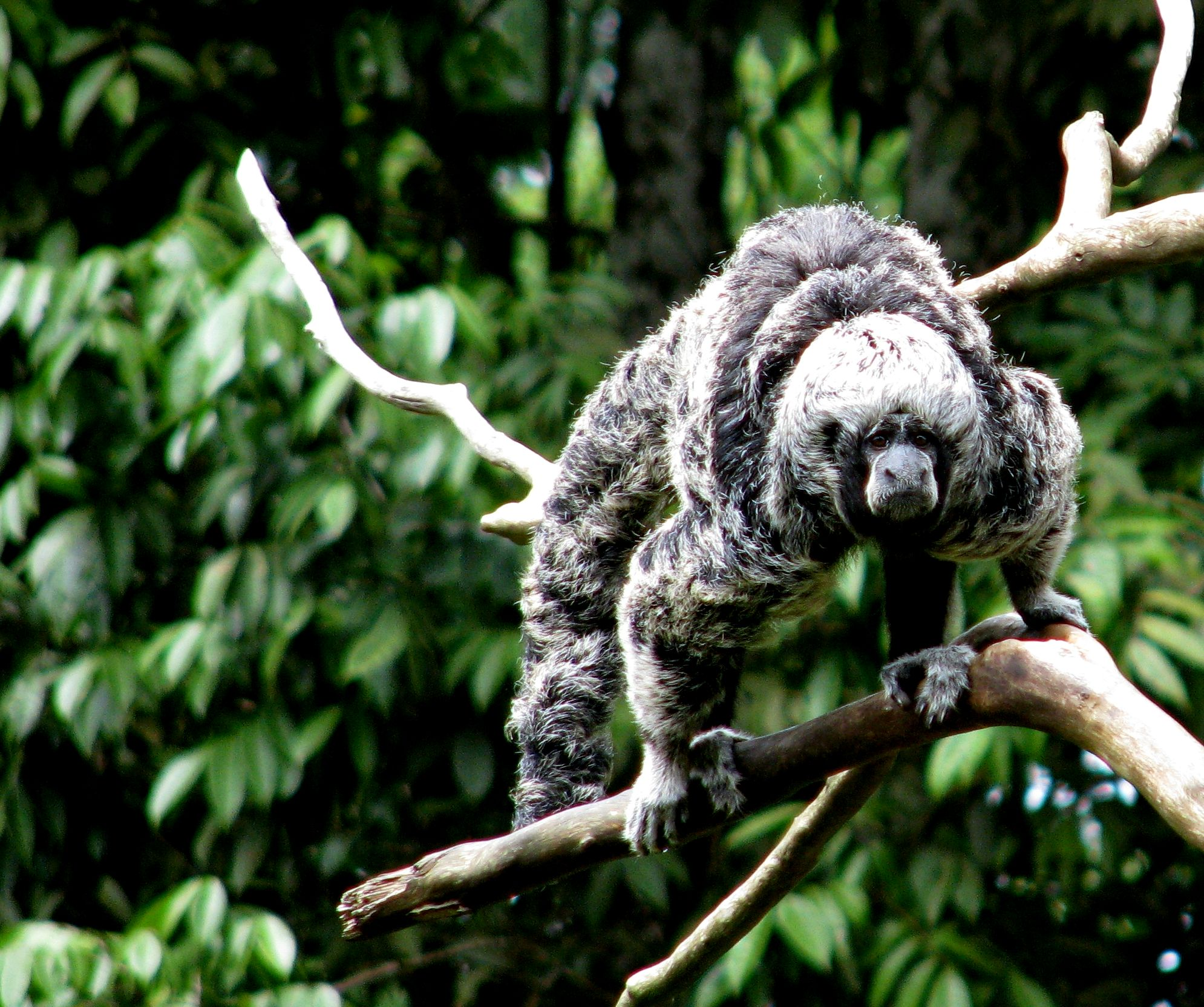

Conservation status
- Data Deficient (IUCN 3.1)

Scientific classification
- Kingdom: Animalia
- Phylum: Chordata
- Class: Mammalia
- Infraclass: Placentalia
- Order: Primates
- Family: Pitheciidae
- Genus: Pithecia
- Species: P. irrorata

Binomial name
- Pithecia irrorata J. E. Gray, 1842
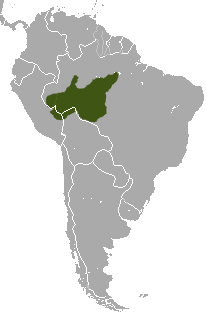
- Rio Tapajós saki range

= Rio Tapajós saki =

Species of New World monkey

The Rio Tapajós saki or Gray's bald-faced saki (Pithecia irrorata) is a species of saki monkey, a type of New World monkey, from South America. It is found in parts of western Brazil, southeastern Colombia, southeastern Peru and possibly northern Bolivia.
