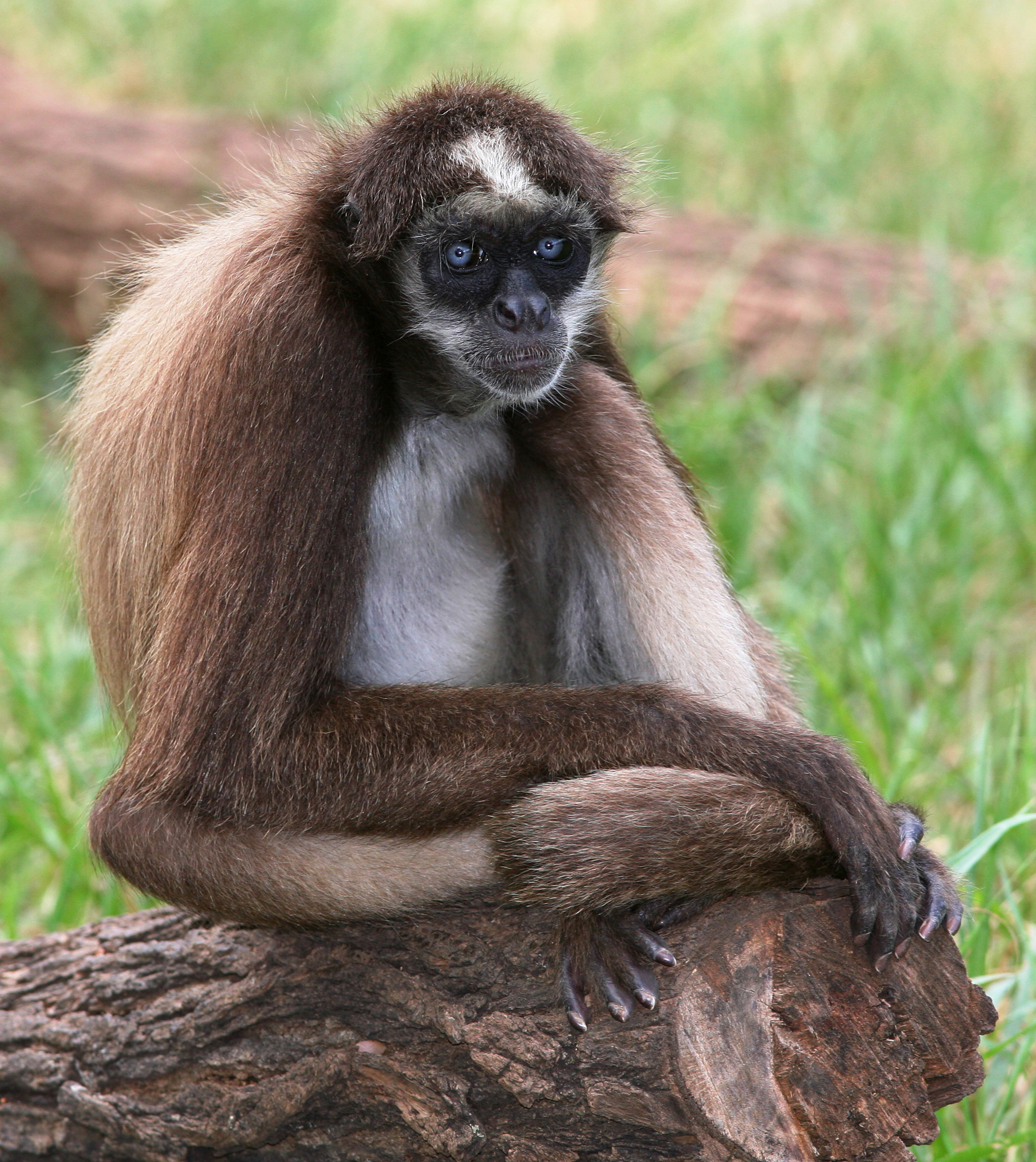
- Brown spider monkey

Scientific classification
- Kingdom: Animalia
- Phylum: Chordata
- Class: Mammalia
- Order: Primates
- Infraorder: Simiiformes
- Parvorder: Platyrrhini; É. Geoffroy, 1812

Type genus
- Cebus Linnaeus, 1758

Families
- Callitrichidae; Cebidae; Aotidae; Pitheciidae; Atelidae; Incertae sedis: †Parvimico; †Homunculus
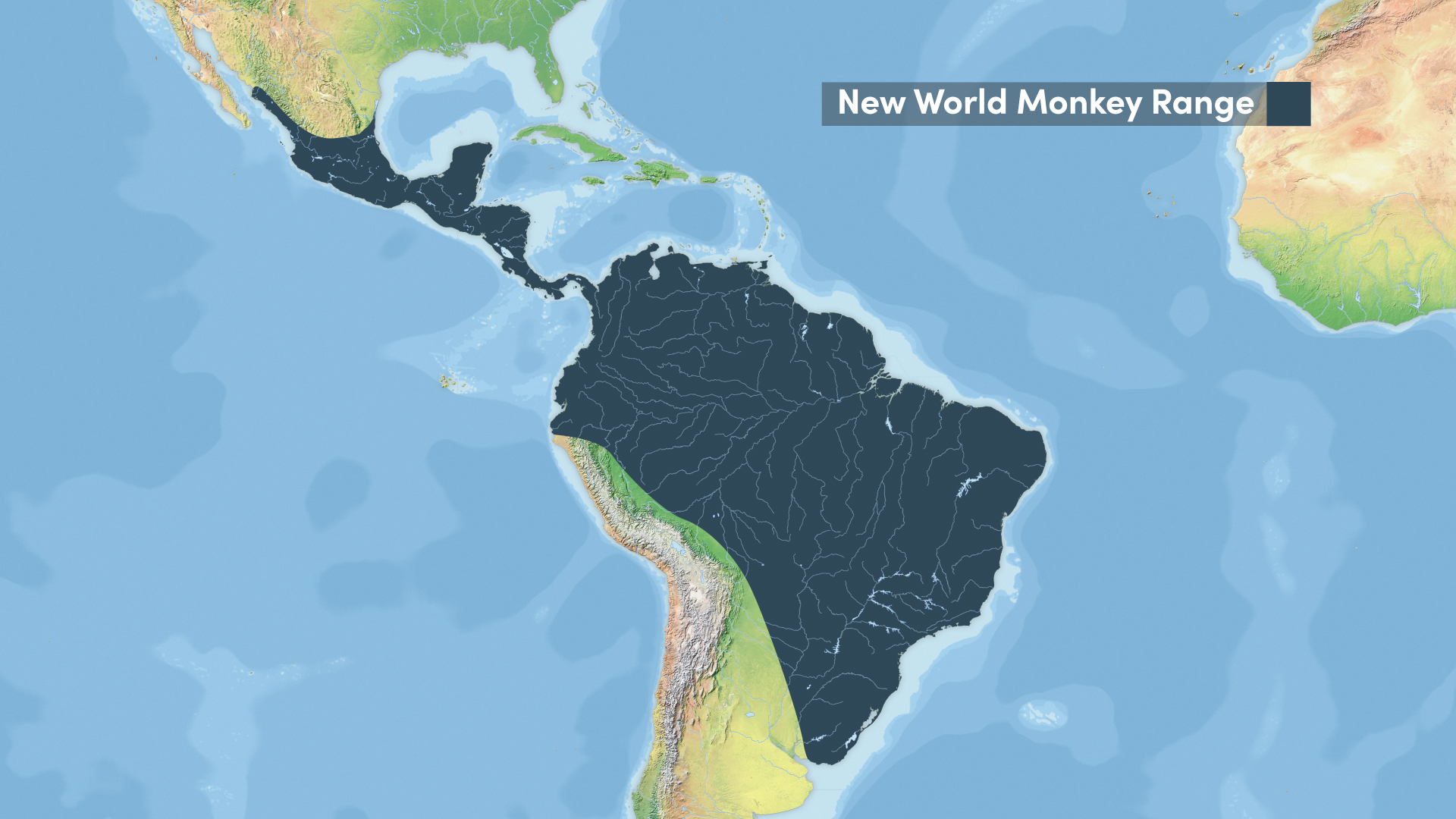
- Distribution of New World monkeys

= New World monkey =

New World monkeys Temporal range: Early Oligocene-Holocene, 31–0 Ma

Parvorder of mammals

New World monkeys are the five families of primates that are found in the tropical regions of Mexico, Central and South America: Callitrichidae, Cebidae, Aotidae, Pitheciidae, and Atelidae. The five families are ranked together as the Ceboidea (/səˈbɔɪdi.ə/), the only extant superfamily in the parvorder Platyrrhini (/plætɪˈraɪnaɪ/).

Platyrrhini is derived from the Greek for "broad nosed", and their noses are flatter than those of other simians, with sideways-facing nostrils. Monkeys in the family Atelidae, such as the spider monkey, are the only primates to have prehensile tails. New World monkeys' closest relatives are the other simians, the Catarrhini ("down-nosed"), comprising Old World monkeys and apes. New World monkeys descend from African simians that colonized South America, a line that split off about 40 million years ago.

== Evolutionary history ==
About 40 million years ago, the Simiiformes infraorder split into the parvorders Platyrrhini (New World monkeys) and Catarrhini (apes and Old World monkeys) somewhere on the African continent. Platyrrhini are currently conjectured to have dispersed to South America on a raft of vegetation across the Atlantic Ocean during the Eocene epoch, possibly via several intermediate now submerged islands. Several other groups of animals made the same journey across the Atlantic, notably including caviomorph rodents. At the time the New World monkeys dispersed to South America, the Isthmus of Panama had not yet formed, so ocean currents, unlike today, favoured westward dispersal, the climate was quite different, and the width of the Atlantic Ocean was less than the present 2,800 km (1,700 mi) width by about a third (possibly 1,000 km (600 mi) less, based on the current estimate of the Atlantic mid-ocean ridge formation processes spreading rate of 25 millimetres per year (1 in/year)).

The non-platyrrhini Ucayalipithecus of Amazonian Peru who might have rafted across the Atlantic between ~35–32 million years ago, are nested within the extinct Parapithecoidea from the Eocene of Afro-Arabia, suggesting that there were at least two separate dispersal events of primates to South America. Parvimico and Perupithecus from Peru appear to be at the base of the Platyrrhini, as are Szalatavus, Lagonimico, and Canaanimico.

Possible evidence for a third transatlantic dispersal event comes from a fossil molar belonging to Ashaninkacebus simpsoni, which has strong affinities with stem anthropoid primates of South Asian origin, the Eosimiidae.

The chromosomal content of the ancestor species appears to have been 2n = 54. In extant species, the 2n value varies from 16 in the titi monkey to 62 in the woolly monkey.

A Bayesian estimate of the most recent common ancestor of the extant species has a 95% credible interval of 27 million years ago-31 million years ago.

== Classification ==
The following is the listing of the various platyrrhine families, as defined by Rylands & Mittermeier (2009), and their position in the Order Primates:

- Order Primates
  - Suborder Strepsirrhini: lemurs, lorises, galagos, etc.
  - Suborder Haplorrhini: tarsiers + monkeys, including apes
    - Infraorder Tarsiiformes: tarsiers
    - Infraorder Simiiformes
      - Parvorder Catarrhini: Old World monkeys, apes (including humans)
      - Parvorder Platyrrhini: New World monkeys
        - Superfamily Ceboidea
          - Family Callitrichidae: marmosets and tamarins
          - Family Cebidae: capuchins and squirrel monkeys
          - Family Aotidae: night or owl monkeys (douroucoulis)
          - Family Pitheciidae: titis, sakis, and uakaris
          - Family Atelidae: howler, spider, woolly spider, and woolly monkeys

The arrangement of the New World monkey families, indeed the listing of which groups consist of families and which consist of lower taxonomic groupings, has changed over the years. McKenna & Bell (1997) used two families: Callitrichidae and Atelidae, with Atelidae divided into Cebinae, Pitheciinae, and Atelinae. Rosenberger (2002 following Horowitz 1999) demoted Callitrichidae to a subfamily, putting it under the newly raised Cebidae family. Groves (2005) used four families, but as a flat structure.

One possible arrangement of the five families and their subfamilies of Rylands & Mittermeier can be seen in Silvestro et al. (2017):

- Platyrrhini
  - Pitheciidae
    - Callicebinae
      titis
    - Pitheciinae
      sakis and uakaris
  - - Atelidae
      - Alouattinae
        howler monkeys
      - Atelinae
        spider, woolly spider, and woolly monkeys
    - - Cebidae
        - Cebinae
          capuchins
        - Saimirinae
          squirrel monkeys
      - - Callitrichidae
          - marmosets and lion tamarins
          - tamarins and saddle-back tamarins
        - Aotidae
          night monkeys

== Characteristics ==
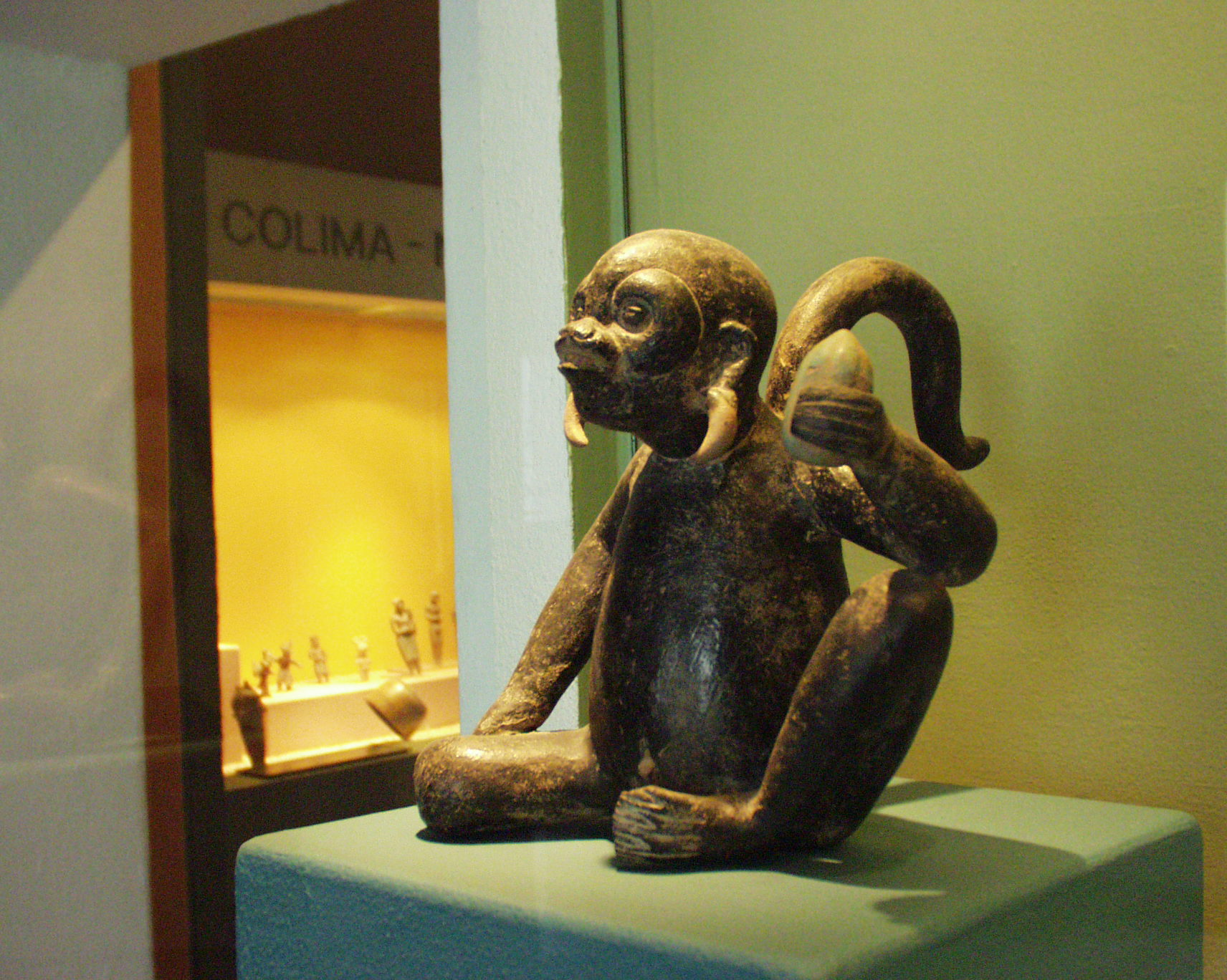
Remojadas-style ceramic sculpture of a monkey at the Amparo Museum

New World monkeys are small to mid-sized primates, ranging from the pygmy marmoset (the world's smallest monkey), at 14 to 16 cm (5.5 to 6.5 in) and a weight of 120 to 190 g (4.2 to 6.7 oz), to the southern muriqui, at 55 to 70 cm (22 to 28 in) and a weight of 12 to 15 kg (26 to 33 lb). New World monkeys differ slightly from Old World monkeys in several aspects. The most prominent phenotypic distinction is the nose, which is the feature used most commonly to distinguish between the two groups. The clade for New World monkeys, Platyrrhini, means "flat nosed". The noses of New World monkeys are flatter than the narrow noses of Old World monkeys, and have side-facing nostrils.

New World monkeys are the only monkeys with prehensile tails—in comparison with the shorter, non-grasping tails of the anthropoids of the Old World. Prehensility has evolved at least two distinct times in platyrrhines, in the Atelidae family (spider monkeys, woolly spider monkeys, howler monkeys, and woolly monkeys), and in capuchin monkeys (Cebus). Although prehensility is present in all of these primate species, skeletal and muscular-based morphological differences between these two groups indicate that the trait evolved separately through convergent evolution. The fully prehensile tails that have evolved in Atelidae allow the primates to suspend their entire body weight by only their tails, with arms and legs free for other foraging and locomotive activities. Semi-prehensile tails in Cebus can be used for balance by wrapping the tail around branches and supporting a large portion of their weight.

New World monkeys (except for the howler monkeys of genus Alouatta) also typically lack the trichromatic vision of Old World monkeys. Colour vision in New World primates relies on a single gene on the X-chromosome to produce pigments that absorb medium and long wavelength light, which contrasts with short wavelength light. As a result, males rely on a single medium/long pigment gene and are dichromatic, as are homozygous females. Heterozygous females may possess two alleles with different sensitivities within this range, and so can display trichromatic vision.

Platyrrhines also differ from Old World monkeys in that they have twelve premolars instead of eight; having a dental formula of 2.1.3.32.1.3.3 or 2.1.3.22.1.3.2 (consisting of 2 incisors, 1 canine, 3 premolars, and 2 or 3 molars). This is in contrast with Old World Anthropoids, including gorillas, chimpanzees, bonobos, siamangs, gibbons, orangutans, and most humans, which share a dental formula of 2.1.2.32.1.2.3. Many New World monkeys are small and almost all are arboreal, so knowledge of them is less comprehensive than that of the more easily observed Old World monkeys. Unlike most Old World monkeys, many New World monkeys form monogamous pair bonds, and show substantial paternal care of young. They eat fruits, nuts, insects, flowers, bird eggs, spiders, and small mammals. Unlike humans and most Old World monkeys, their thumbs are not opposable (except for some cebids).

== See also ==
- List of platyrrhines
- List of primates by population
- List of fossil primates of South America
