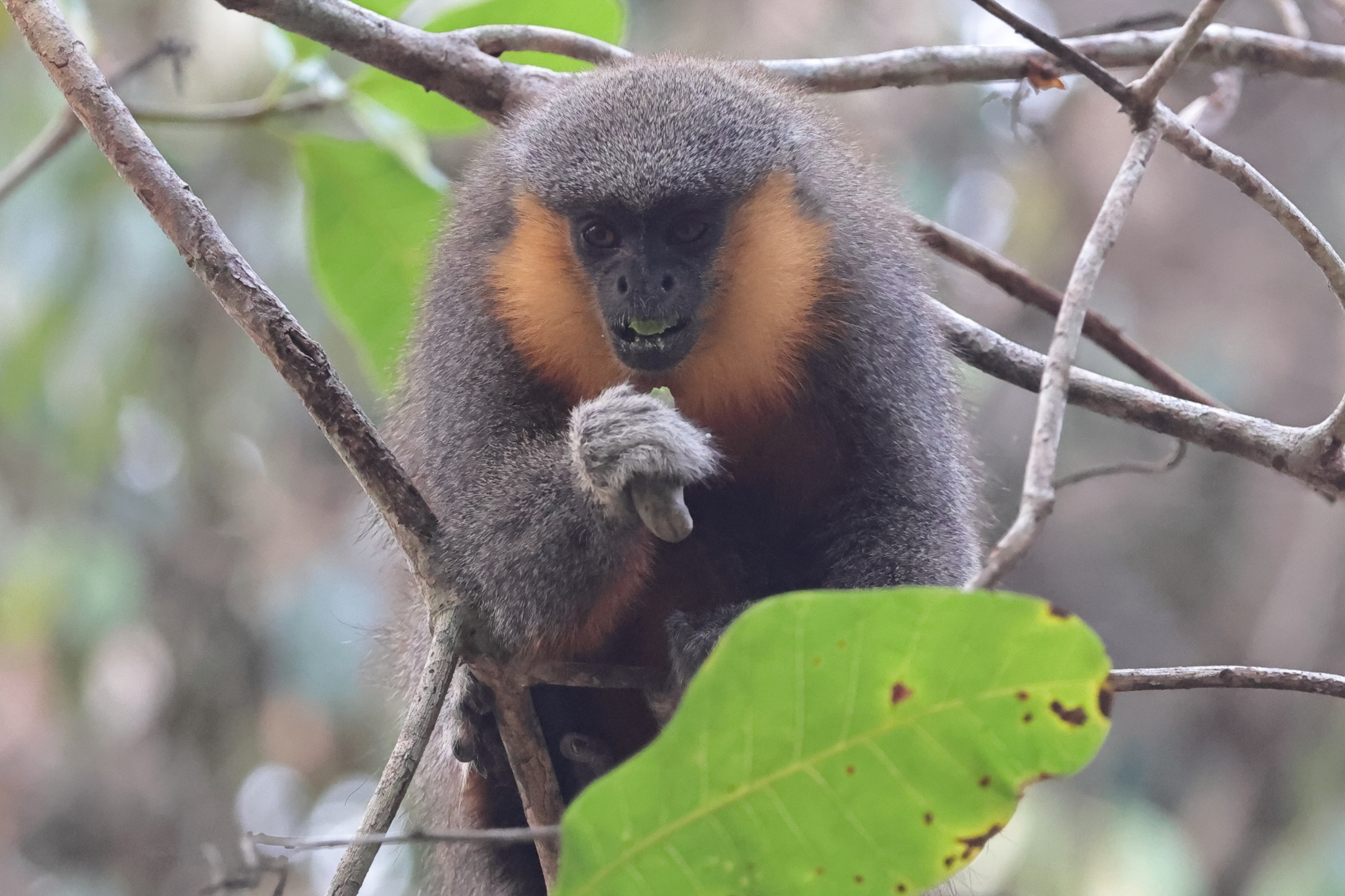

Conservation status
- Least Concern (IUCN 3.1)

Scientific classification
- Kingdom: Animalia
- Phylum: Chordata
- Class: Mammalia
- Order: Primates
- Family: Pitheciidae
- Genus: Plecturocebus
- Species: P. bernhardi

Binomial name
- Plecturocebus bernhardi (van Roosmalen, van Roosmalen and Mittermeier, 2002)
- Geographic range

Synonyms
- Callicebus bernhardi van Roosmalen, van Roosmalen and Mittermeier, 2002, 2002

= Prince Bernhard's titi monkey =

Species of New World monkey

Prince Bernhard's titi monkey (Plecturocebus bernhardi), also called the zog-zog monkey, is a species of titi monkey in the genus Plecturocebus, first described in 2002. It is named after Prince Bernhard of the Netherlands. They have varying coloration of gray, black, and agouti, with dark orange in certain regions. They are endemic to Brazil, found mostly in disturbed forest environments. While officially listed as least-concern by the International Union for the Conservation of Nature (IUCN), they may, in fact, be at risk due to human-caused deforestation.

== Etymology and taxonomy ==
The species is known to locals of the regions it inhabits as a zog-zog or zogue-zogue; however, that name has also been applied to the coppery titi monkey (Plecturocebus cupreus). Its English common name was selected in honor of Prince Bernhard of the Netherlands, who created the Order of the Golden Ark, an award equivalent to knighthood, presented each year to a group of conservationists.

Prince Bernhard's titi monkey belongs to the genus Plecturocebus. It was originally described by Marc van Roosmalen et al. in 2002 as Callicebus bernhardi, with the holotype being a complete, mature skeleton, collected in November 1998. It and Callicebus stephennashi were the 37th and 38th species of primates to be described since 1990, and the 23rd and 24th monkeys described since that year. Van Roosmalen explained how the area where it is found is filled with undescribed species. In 2016, the genus was split into four new genera, with bernhardi ending up in the moloch group of the newly created genus Plecturocebus. Other members of that group include P. moloch, P. cinerascens, P. hoffmannsi, P. baptista, and P. brunneus.

== Description ==
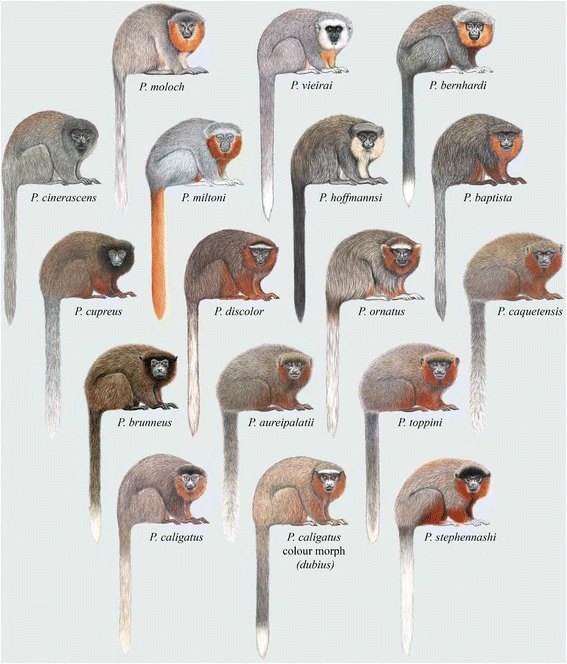
Illustration of various titi monkeys; the furthest toward the upper right is this species

C. bernhardi has dark orange sideburns, underparts, and inner limbs (of a more uniform shade than P. cinerascens). The upper regions of its body and head are grayish black, while on its back, these shades are mixed with brownish agouti or reddish brown. Its face is black, with white hairs around its nose and mouth. Its ears are also black, with whitish tufts. Its mostly black tail is contrasted by a white tip. Its hairs are 5 centimetres (2.0 in) long. Its grayish forehead and crown help distinguish it from P. brunneus, which is dark brown to black in these areas, while the white ear tufts and tail tip distinguish it from P. hoffmannsil and P. baptista. Its lack of black vibrissae (whiskers) sets it apart from P. dubius.

== Distribution and habitat ==
=== Distribution ===
The Prince Bernhard's titi monkey is endemic to Brazil, specifically the states of Amazonas and Rondônia, and possibly Mato Grosso, although its presence in the third is uncertain, having possibly been sighted in Alta Floresta. It is found between the Madeira and Aripuanã rivers. The range of P. bernhardi overlaps with those of P. cinerascens and P. hoffmannsi at the headwaters of the Juruena, Aripuanã, and Roosevelt rivers. They occur in protected areas, including Ipixuna Indigenous Land.

=== Habitat ===
P. bernhardi prefer to live in disturbed forest, either naturally disturbed or disturbed by humans. Specifically, they enjoy to live in blow-downs (swathes of secondary forest affected by massive storms), liana forests, forests near plantations and fields, and seringais. Seringais are a type of agroforestry where forests grow along white-water rivers. Commercially important trees in these forests include rubber, Brazil nut, and cacao.

== Behavior ==
=== Diet ===
Prince Bernhard's titi monkeys have been observed feeding on the fruits of Oenocarpus distichus and Orbignya phalerata, younger leaves and fruit of plants of the genus Inga, and shrubs and lianas of unknown classification.

=== Vocalizations ===
In the early morning, before dawn, all the pairs in one area often begin to perform duet calls together.

=== Thermoregulation ===
To keep their metabolism functioning as it should Prince Bernhard's titi monkeys practice thermoregulation behaviors when they are not at their ideal temperature to keep their metabolism in balance. In higher levels of heat, especially over 31 °C (88 °F), they avoid sunny places, although they begin to use heat-dissipating postures at as low as 27 °C (81 °F). Higher levels of humidity also lead to a greater use of these behaviors. While individuals huddle together in the night, with tails entwined, this behavior does not correlate to temperature, suggesting it is instead practiced to satisfy social needs.

== Conservation ==
The Prince Bernhard's titi monkey is of least-concern by the International Union for Conservation of Nature (IUCN). The organization considered it to not be at risk due to its large range and lack of human impact on its habitat. They concluded that it has a stable population and no known threats. However, later research efforts found that its habitat, in the Arc of Deforestation (an area in the southeastern Amazon rainforest defined by heavy deforestation), was at risk. It is estimated that it will lose 44.5 percent of its current range over the course of the next 24 years (three generations for this species). From this study, the researchers concluded that its status should be changed to vulnerable.
