= DeeAnn M. Reeder =

- Born: DeeAnn Marie Reeder; May 30, 1969 (age 57)
- Education: University of California, Berkeley (B.A.); University of California, Davis (M.S., Ph.D.)
- Known for: Bat disease ecology, White-nose syndrome, Mammal Species of the World
- Scientific career
- Fields: Mammalogy
- Workplaces: Bucknell University
- Doctoral advisor: Sally Mendoza
- Author abbrev. (zoology): Reeder

DeeAnn Marie Reeder (born May 30, 1969) is an American mammalogist who specializes in bats and their diseases.

== Biography ==
Reeder received her Bachelor of Arts in 1991 from the University of California, Berkeley, and her Master of Science in 1997 from the University of California, Davis. In 2001, she earned her Ph.D. at UC Davis under the supervision of Sally Mendoza, with a dissertation titled The biology of parenting in the monogamous titi monkey (Callicebus moloch), on various aspects of infant caregiving behavior in a captive colony of the coppery titi monkey (Plecturocebus cupreus (Note: at the time considered conspecific with the red-bellied titi monkey P. moloch, as the dusky titi monkey Callicebus moloch)).

After completing a postdoctoral fellowship under Thomas H. Kunz at Boston University, she joined Bucknell University in Lewisburg, Pennsylvania as an assistant professor in 2005. She was promoted to full professor in 2014.

Her research focuses on disease ecology, behavior, physiology, and conservation in bats. She has studied the relationships between bat health, ecosystem health, and zoonotic disease risks in epauletted fruit bats in Central and East Africa. Reeder has also conducted extensive research on white-nose syndrome (WNS), a wildlife disease devastating North American bat populations. She holds a research appointment at the National Museum of Natural History of the Smithsonian Institution in Washington, D.C. In addition to her bat research, she is recognized internationally for studies of mammalian biodiversity, particularly in South Sudan.

In June 1993, together with Don E. Wilson, Reeder co-edited the second edition of Mammal Species of the World, which listed 26 orders and 4,629 species. The third edition followed in December 2005 in two volumes, covering 29 orders and 5,416 species. Mammal Species of the World became a standard reference work on mammals and is also available as an online database.

In 2013, Reeder was part of the team that described the new monotypic genus Niumbaha for the pied bat, originally described by Robert William Hayman in 1939 as a member of Glauconycteris.

In 2025, she published the book The Lives of Bats: A Natural History.
