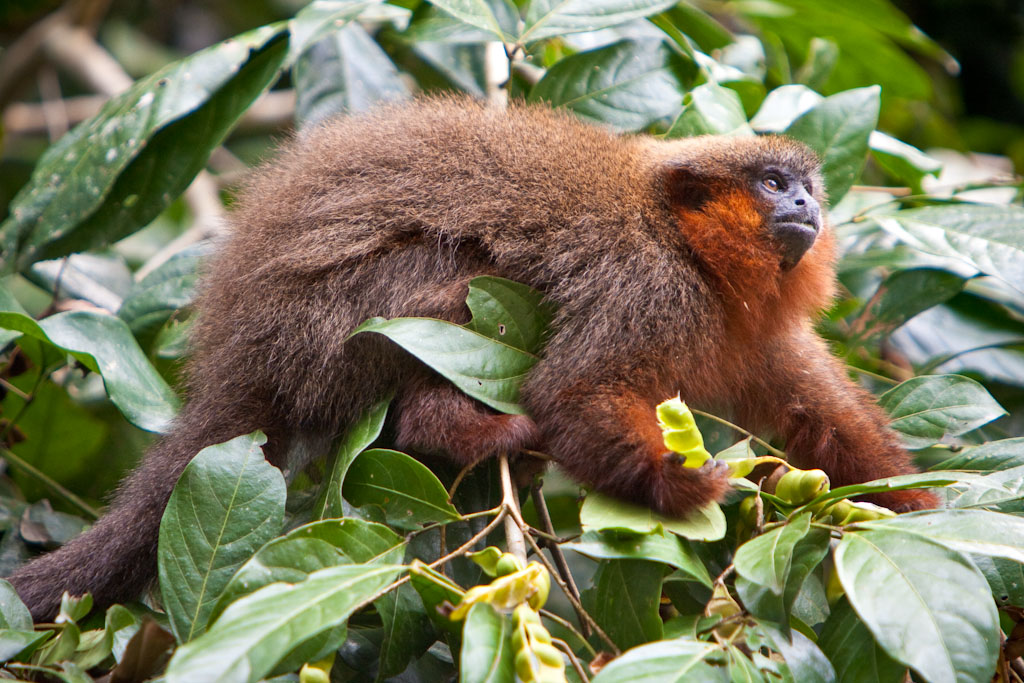
- In Tambopata National Reserve

Conservation status
- Least Concern (IUCN 3.1)

Scientific classification
- Kingdom: Animalia
- Phylum: Chordata
- Class: Mammalia
- Order: Primates
- Family: Pitheciidae
- Genus: Plecturocebus
- Species: P. toppini

Binomial name
- Plecturocebus toppini (Thomas, 1914)

= Toppin's titi monkey =

Species of New World monkey

Toppin's titi monkey (Plecturocebus toppini) is a species of titi monkey, a type of New World monkey, from Brazil, Peru, and Bolivia.

== Taxonomy ==
It was described in 1914 by Oldfield Thomas but was afterwards considered conspecific with the coppery titi (P. cupreus). However, a 2015 paper revived it as a distinct species, finding it to be phenotypically distinguishable from P. cupreus. The results of this study were followed by the IUCN Red List, ITIS, and American Society of Mammalogists. In addition, the same paper raised doubt over the distinctiveness of the Madidi titi (P. aureipalatii) due to one of the captured P. toppini specimens closely resembling P. aureipalatii, indicating that P. aureipalatii could be just a color variant of P. toppini. In addition, there may be specimens of P. toppini misidentified as specimens of P. cupreus or the brown titi (P. brunneus), thus requiring further examination.

It was named after Captain Harry Stanley Toppin, who collected the type specimen of this species near the Tahuamanu River in Peru.

== Distribution ==
This species has a wide range in Bolivia, Brazil, and Peru, being found east of the Urubamba River and likely west of the Ituxi River & north of the Tambopata and Madre De Dios rivers. However, the exact distribution limits remain uncertain.

== Description ==
This is a reddish-colored species that has a less fluffy and less whitish tail compared to P. cupreus.
