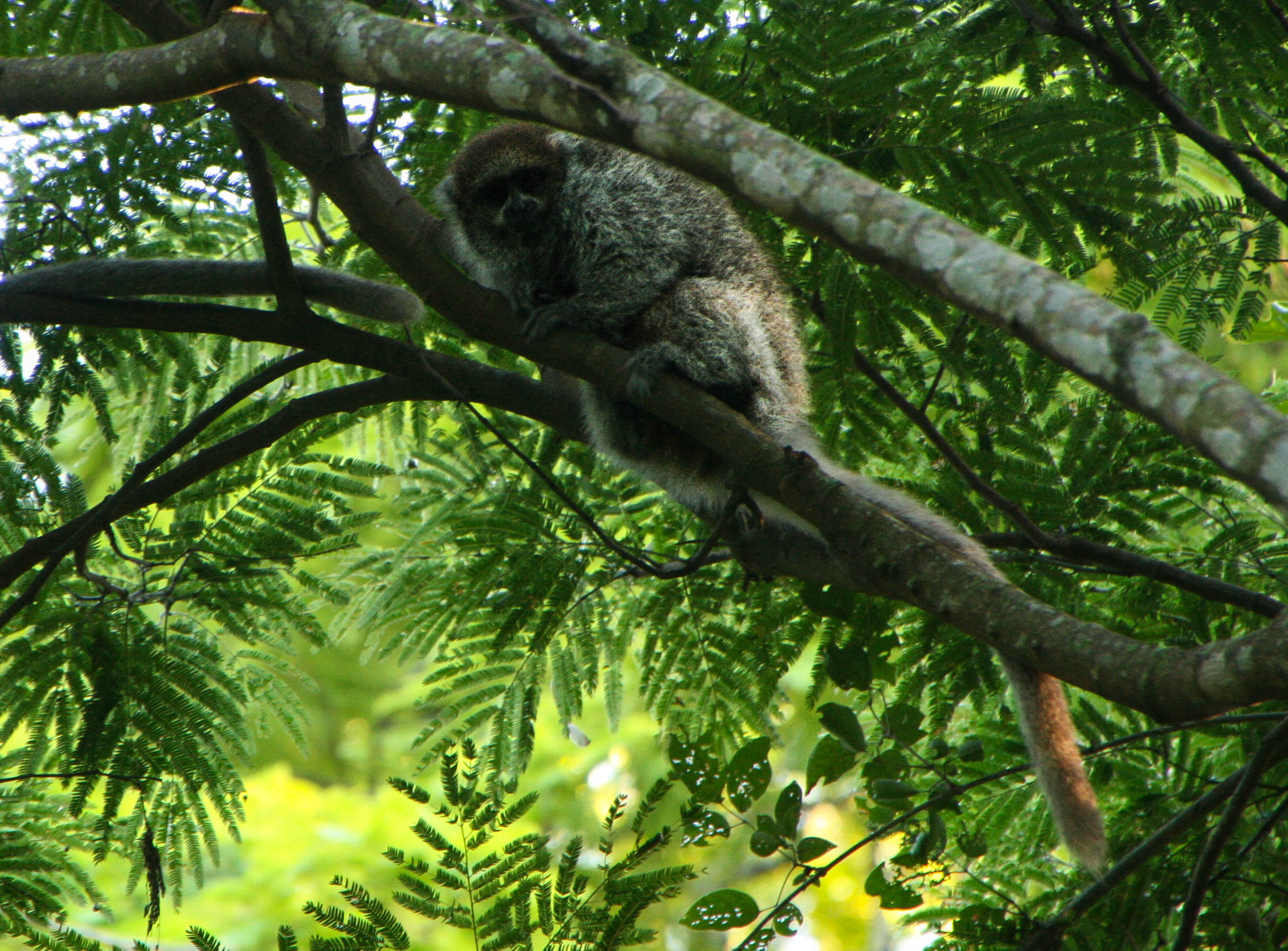

Conservation status
- Least Concern (IUCN 3.1)

Scientific classification
- Kingdom: Animalia
- Phylum: Chordata
- Class: Mammalia
- Order: Primates
- Family: Pitheciidae
- Genus: Plecturocebus
- Species: P. donacophilus

Binomial name
- Plecturocebus donacophilus (d'Orbigny, 1836)
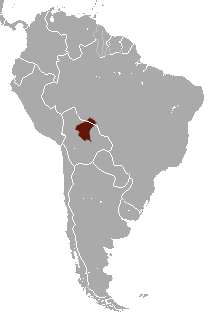
- White-eared titi range

Synonyms
- Callicebus donacophilus d'Orbigny, 1836

= White-eared titi monkey =

White-eared titi

Species of New World monkey

The white-eared titi monkey (Plecturocebus donacophilus) also known as the Bolivian titi or Bolivian gray titi, is a species of titi monkey, a type of New World monkey, from eastern Bolivia and an area of western Brazil. The species has a range that extends east from the Manique River in Beni Department, Bolivia to southern Rondônia in Brazil. The southern end of its range includes forests around the city of Santa Cruz de la Sierra.

It is a medium-sized monkey with a grey back, orange underside and distinctive white ear tufts. It has an omnivorous diet, eating fruits, other plant materials and invertebrates. It is a monogamous species and lives in small groups of two to seven members consisting of the pair and their offspring. The family group has a home range of 0.5 to 14 hectares (1.2 to 34.6 acres) and the adults have a complex vocal repertoire to maintain their territory. It is also known for its characteristic twining of tails when groups are sitting together. White-eared titis can live for more than 25 years in captivity.

The white-eared titi population has a declining trend. The decline is believed to be mainly caused by human-induced habitat loss and degradation. Despite this, the International Union for Conservation of Nature (IUCN) classified the species as being of least concern in 2008 as it has shown adaptability to habitat disturbance and is found over a wide range.

== Taxonomy ==
The white-eared titi belongs to the New World monkey family Pitheciidae, which contains the titis, saki monkeys (Pithecia), bearded sakis (Chiropotes), and uakaris (Cacajao). It is a member of the subfamily Callicebinae. It was first described as Callicebus donacophilus in 1836, but was reassessed based on molecular evidence and recombined as a species within the genus Plecturocebus.

Within the new genus Plecturocebus, the white-eared titi is part of the P. donacophilus group with the Rio Beni titi (P. modestus), Rio Mayo titi (P. oenanthe), Olalla brothers' titi (P. olallae), white-coated titi (P. pallescens), and Urubamba brown titi, (P. urubambensis). The white-coated titi has sometimes been considered a subspecies of the white-eared titi, but they are treated as separate species in the latest edition of Mammal Species of the World.

== Physical description ==
The white-eared titi is a medium-sized primate with grey to orange pelage. The species does not exhibit sexual dimorphism; the male's head and body length averages 311 millimetres (12.2 in) while females average 340 millimetres (13 in). The white-eared titi's fluffy tail is longer than the length of its head and body together. It typically has thick fur, with a dorsal side and limbs that vary in colour from grey agouti to orange agouti, with an orange underside and white ear tufts.

Body weight ranges from around 800 to 1,200 grams (1.8 to 2.6 lb), with the female generally a little lighter. It has the dental formula 2.1.3.32.1.3.3 × 2 = 36, meaning that on each side of the jaw it has two incisors, one canine tooth, three premolars, and three molar teeth. The canine teeth are relatively short when compared with other New World monkeys. In captivity, the white-eared titi has been known to live for over 25 years.

== Behaviour ==
The white-eared titi is cryptic, diurnal and known to live in small family groups. It is a monogamous species that is thought to mate for life and lives in groups that usually consist of two to seven members; an adult pair and up to five young. Multi-male groups have also been recorded. Offspring are carried by the male, and are always with them, except when feeding. Between the ages of two and four years, offspring will disperse from the natal group, with females leaving earlier than the males.

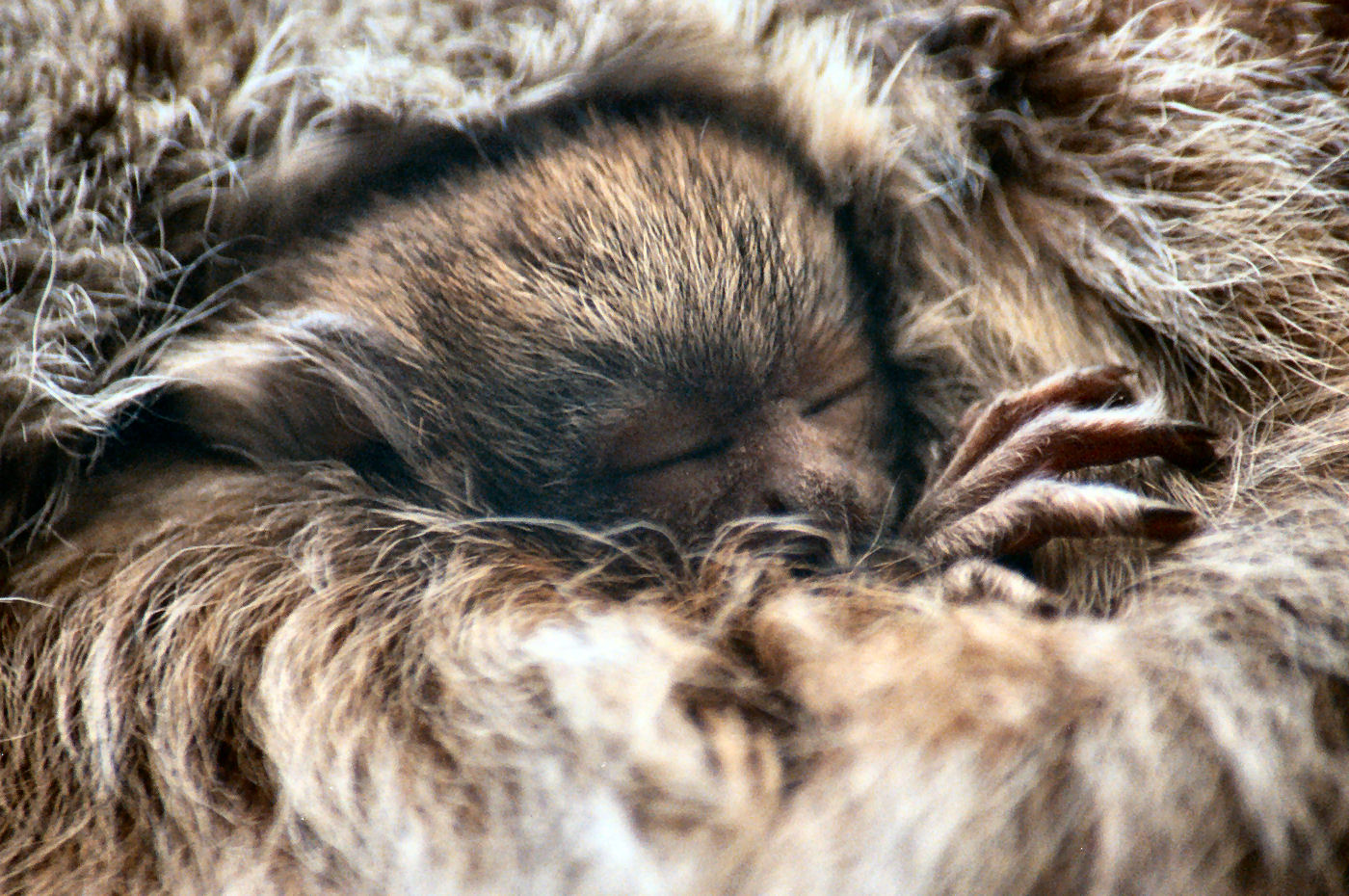
Young are carried during their first few months.

There is a strong bond between the adult mating pair, they stay close and carry out activities together. Either member of the pair may follow the other and leadership changes through the day. Evidence of the strength of the pair bond is shown by grooming, huddling together with their tails twined, nuzzling, and gentle grasping. Titi monkeys are highly territorial and when confronted with another family group, both will respond with threatening behaviour, males showing increased agitation towards intruding males. When not close together, the pair show a significant amount of distress and agitation.

Titi monkeys are well known for their vocal communication, and have a complex repertoire of calls. The calls can be divided into two categories: high-pitched quiet calls and low-pitched loud calls. Vocalisations are often combined and repeated to form sequences that are used to indicate distress, conflict, play, bonding, disturbance, and to strengthen territory. The high-pitched quiet calls are mostly used when the monkeys are disturbed, but may also be used before or after group calling, while foraging, or to find other members of the group. The loud low-pitched calls are mostly used in long distance group calling. Their function is to ensure adequate spacing between the home ranges of different family groups. These vocalisations are known as duets, and generally involve the male and female. If a neighbouring group is within earshot of these calls they will respond with their own duetting.

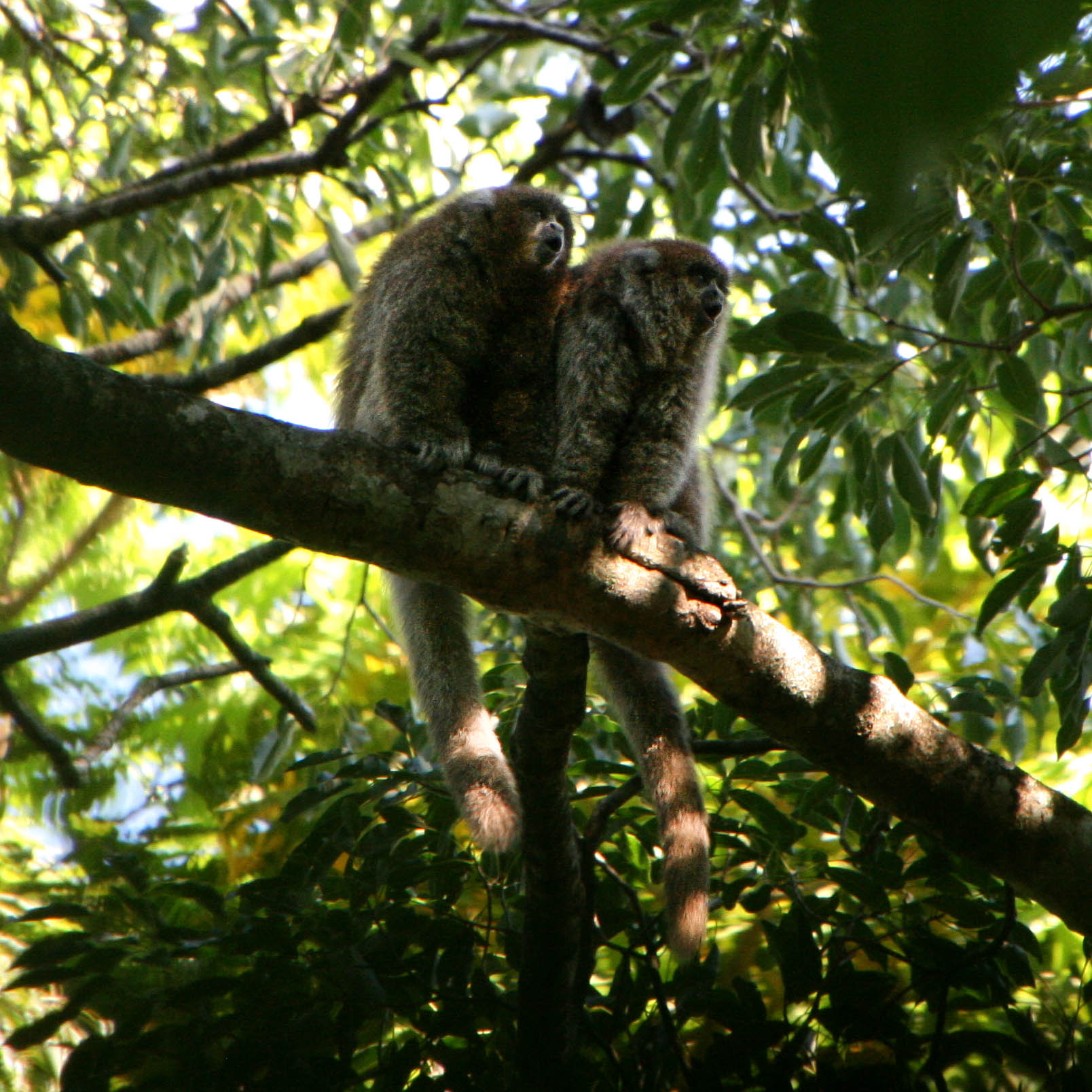
The white-eared titi has a complex vocal repertoire.

The white-eared titi is arboreal, spending most of its time in the lower strata of the forest. It may enter the main canopy when travelling longer distances and may also cross small areas of open ground, though the latter is rare. During normal movement through its environment it is quadrupedal and mostly walks, clambers and leaps, but it can also bound and climb. It leaps small distances, no more than a few body lengths, between trees where vegetation is not thick enough to support its primary forms of locomotion. When travelling on the ground it is said to use a "bounding movement" whereby it leaps more than 1 metre (3.3 ft) off the ground. The titi monkey prefers branches which are less than 5 centimetres (2.0 in) in diameter and its tail never touches the support it is on.

== Ecology ==
There is relatively little known about the ecology of the white-eared titi or even titi monkeys in general, and few studies have focused on the white-eared titi. It is diurnal, commencing activity around sunrise and continuing until sunset. Food availability may influence activity times; if there is an abundance of food in the warmer months when plants are fruiting titi monkeys may start earlier, or if there is a lack of food, titi monkeys may remain at the feeding tree into the evening. The titi monkey usually rests during the middle of the day and has two main feeding periods, in the morning and in the afternoon. It has an increased period of feeding towards the end of the day. In total, the titi monkey is active for an average of 11.5 hours, 2.7 hours of which is spent feeding. Titi monkeys sleep on branches at least 15 metres (49 ft) above the ground. In the same manner as resting during the day, titi monkeys huddle together and twine tails to sleep.

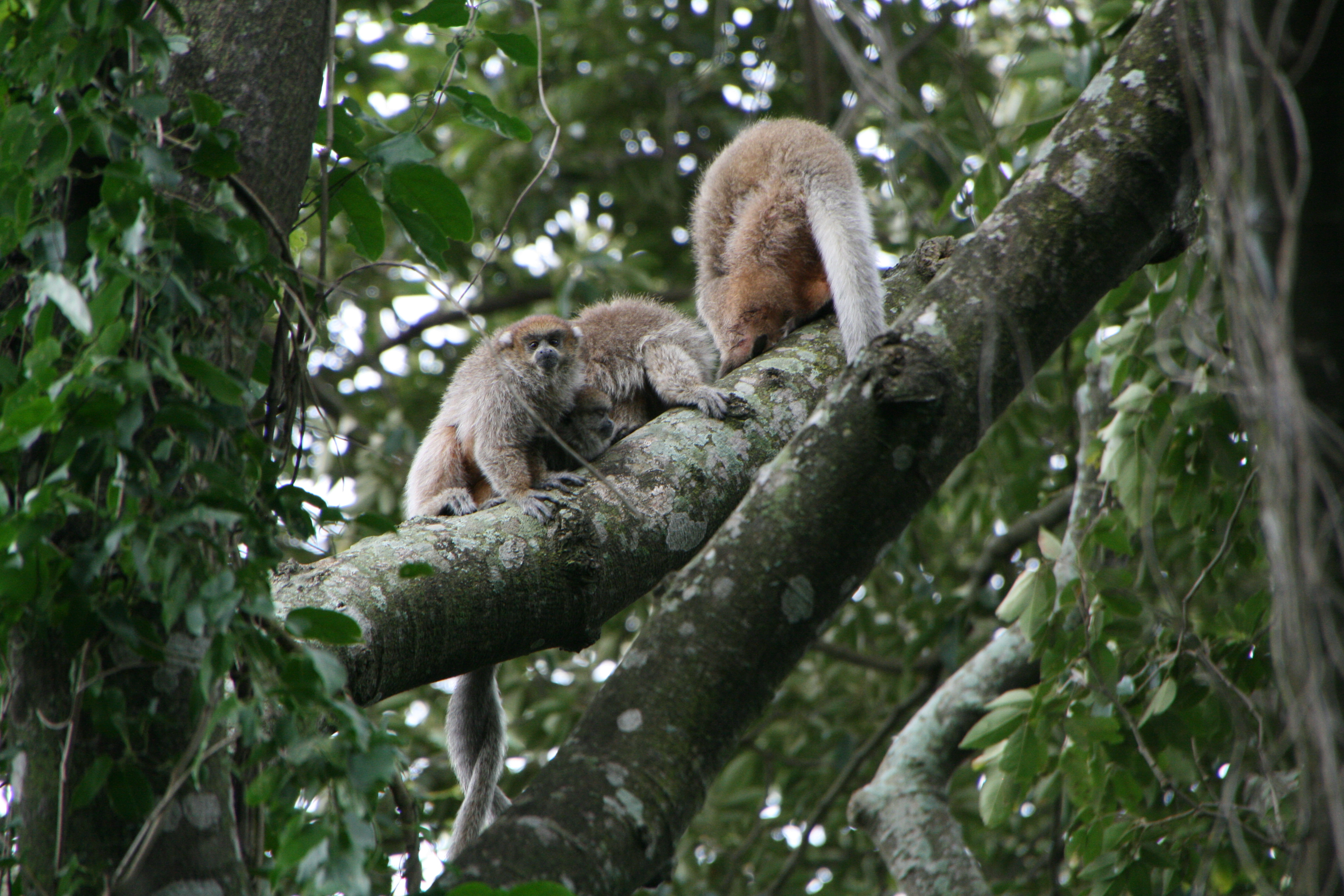
When resting as a group white-eared titis often twine tails together.

Though there is little published research on the diet of the white-eared titi, titi monkeys in general are omnivores that eat fruit, leaves, insects, and seeds. They mostly eat leaves, especially protein-rich young leaves and leaf buds, so a significant period of the day is spent resting to digest the cellulose. They consume more than 100 different species of plants and fruit. Titi monkeys will also eat small insects (ants, moths, butterflies, and their cocoons), spiders, and can catch flying prey if it comes close to them. During the dry season there is an increased feeding time on leaves, and during lactation it is thought insect consumption increases to augment the protein content of the diet.

The titi monkey may travel between 425 and 1,152 m (1,394 and 3,780 ft) during the day, and can maintain a home range of 0.005 to 0.14 km^{2} (0.0019 to 0.0541 sq mi). During the dry season there is less fruit available and therefore less need to travel large distances, so the day range may only be a third of the usual distance. Its home range is often shared with other primate species including marmosets, squirrel monkeys, capuchins, owl monkeys, howler monkeys, and spider monkeys. It is sometimes chased from feeding sites by larger species, and will generally try to avoid other primates.

=== Habitat and distribution ===
The white-eared titi is found in tropical humid forests, preferring drier regions to more humid ones. It is found in riparian zones and gallery forests and is clearly associated with open habitats like grasslands and swampy grasslands. It is found in areas with dense vegetation, often choosing to inhabit the thickest parts of the forest. The species seems to be quite tolerant of habitat disturbance. In Bolivia, the white-eared titi is found in the upper parts of the Mamoré, Grande, and San Miguel river basins, east of the Manique River in Beni and in the forests surrounding the city of Santa Cruz de la Sierra. Its range extends north to southern Rondônia in Brazil.

== Conservation status ==
The white-eared titi is considered to be of least concern on the International Union for Conservation of Nature (IUCN) Red List. The species is not considered threatened due to its adaptability and abundance over a relatively wide range, and despite having a decreasing population trend the decline is not rapid enough to be placed in a threatened category. The species is also listed on CITES Appendix II.

The white-eared titi's main threat is deforestation and habitat loss due to agriculture. The area of greatest habitat loss is around the city of Santa Cruz de la Sierra, but it still survives within the city limits and on the edges of many rural establishments. It has few natural predators and is proven to be adaptable to habitat disturbance. Farmland may surround and isolate areas of titi habitat which occasionally has positive benefits to the monkey. Farmers may prevent hunters on the land, thereby inadvertently protecting the species. It also appears that the titi monkey can cross open ground between forest fragments, and some groups can thrive in disturbed habitats near human activities. However, the fragmented habitats may prevent the establishment of new territories and decrease reproductive opportunities. Forest corridors to connect fragmented forests have been proposed as an effective means to help ensure the survival of the titi monkey. The white-eared titi is found in the Beni Biological Station Biosphere Reserve and the Amboro National Park in Bolivia and benefits from the protection these reserves provide.

== Predation ==
Predators of white-eared titi monkeys include crested eagles and ornate hawk eagles. Other predators include jaguars and various arboreal snakes. Predation on infants by tufted capuchins has also been observed.
