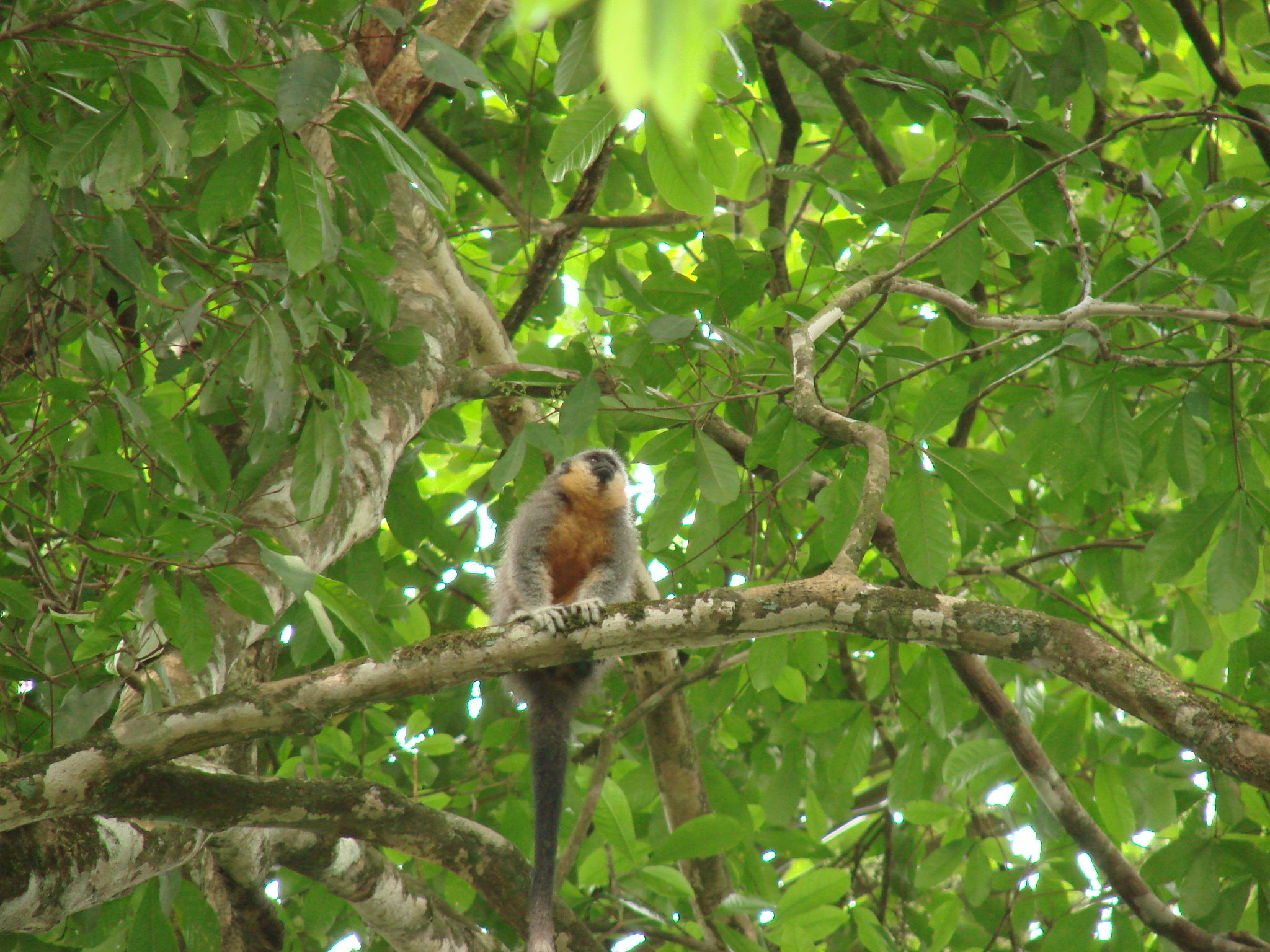

Conservation status
- Critically Endangered (IUCN 3.1)

Scientific classification
- Kingdom: Animalia
- Phylum: Chordata
- Class: Mammalia
- Infraclass: Placentalia
- Order: Primates
- Family: Pitheciidae
- Genus: Plecturocebus
- Species: P. grovesi

Binomial name
- Plecturocebus grovesi Boubli et al., 2019
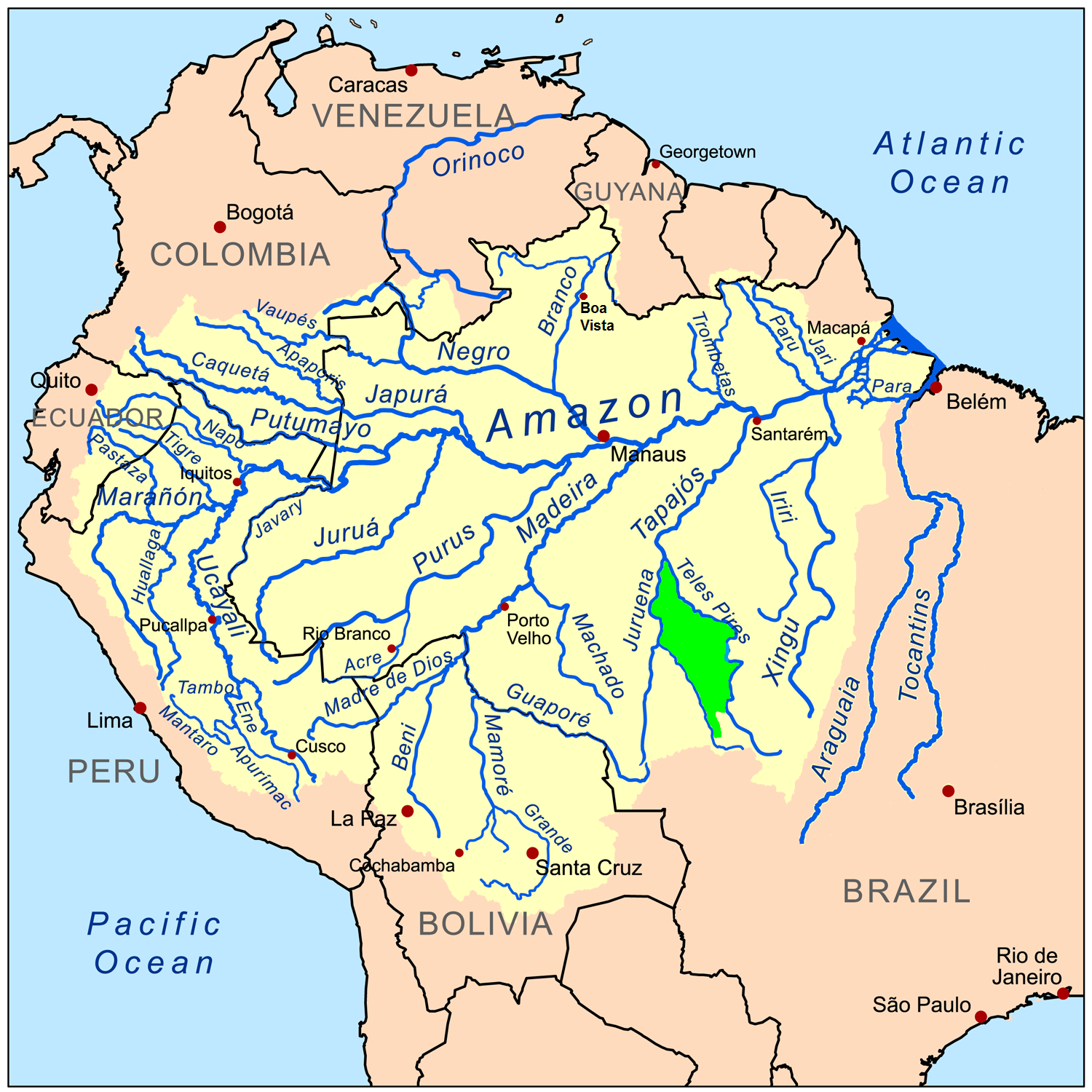
- Range map

= Alta Floresta titi monkey =

Species of New World monkey

The Alta Floresta titi monkey (Plecturocebus grovesi), also known as the Groves's titi monkey, is a species of titi monkey, a type of New World monkey, endemic to Brazil. It was described from the municipality of Alta Floresta in the state of Mato Grosso.

It is a member of the Eastern Amazonian clade of the red-bellied titi monkey (P. moloch) group, and is the sister taxon to the clade containing the red-bellied titi and Vieira's titi monkey (P. vieirai). It can be distinguished from other species in the P. moloch group by the combination of its agouti dorsal parts, the bright red-brown venter, the entirely black tail with a white tip, and the light yellow fur on the cheeks.

This species is projected to lose up to 86% of its forest habitat under a typical deforestation rate, and is thus classified as Critically Endangered under the IUCN Red List.
