= Parecis titi monkey =

Conservation status
- Near Threatened (IUCN 3.1)

Scientific classification
- Kingdom: Animalia
- Phylum: Chordata
- Class: Mammalia
- Infraclass: Placentalia
- Order: Primates
- Family: Pitheciidae
- Genus: Plecturocebus
- Species: P. parecis

Binomial name
- Plecturocebus parecis Gusmão et al., 2019

Species of New World monkey

The Parecis titi monkey (Plecturocebus parecis) is a species of titi monkey, a type of New World monkey, endemic to Brazil. It is popularly referred to as zogue-zogue in Portuguese, and as otôhô in the local Paresi language.

== Taxonomy ==
Titi monkeys from the Parecis Plateau were first reported by scientists in 1914, and subsequently identified as the ashy black titi (P. cinerascens) in a follow-up report. Such titi monkeys were then suggested to belong to a distinctive species in 2011, and described as a distinctive species, Plecturocebus parecis, in 2019. The results of this study were followed by the IUCN Red List, ITIS, and American Society of Mammalogists. However, it is uncertain if P. parecis is a valid species as the type specimens group with P. cinerascens and P. bernhardi. Further research is needed to confirm the taxonomic validity of this species.

== Distribution ==
This species is endemic to a small portion of Brazil, where its range is still poorly defined. Its range largely coincides with higher-elevation areas in the transition zone between the Amazon Rainforest and the Cerrado, including parts of the Parecis Plateau and the interfluves of the Aripuanã River with the Juruena and Roosevelt rivers. However, it is also known from relatively low-lying areas in Juruena National Park.

== Description ==
It can be distinguished from all other Plecturocebus species by the grayish-white color of the throat, sideburns, breast, and inner limb surfaces, and its tail also turns white towards the tip.

== Status ==
The range of this species coincides with the "Arc of Deforestation", an agricultural frontier of the southern Amazon where the deforestation of the Amazon rainforest is the highest. The remaining tracts of native forest are impacted frequently by wildfires in the dry season, and further forest fragmentation has occurred due to the construction of hydroelectric dams, such as the UHE Rondon II. Increasing establishment of rural settlements due to land reform and squatting has led to further degradation and deforestation. Despite this, its habitat lies within some of the few protected areas in the region, and the steep sides of the Parecis Plateau make deforestation and development unappealing in the area. Due to this, it is classified as Near Threatened by the IUCN Red List.
