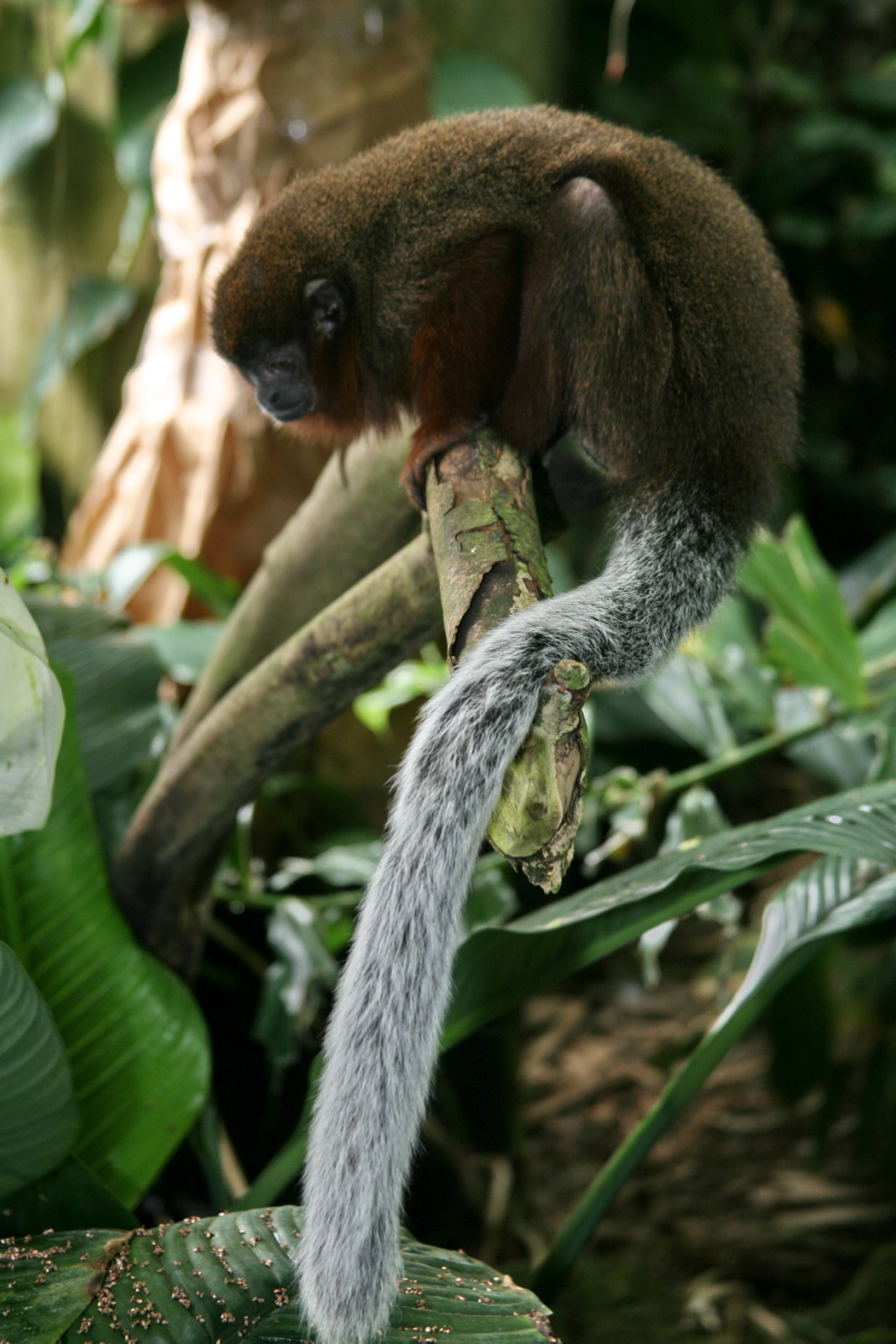
- Brown titi (Plecturocebus brunneus)

Scientific classification
- Kingdom: Animalia
- Phylum: Chordata
- Class: Mammalia
- Order: Primates
- Family: Pitheciidae
- Subfamily: Callicebinae; Pocock, 1925

Genera
- Cheracebus; Callicebus; Plecturocebus

= Titi monkey =

Titis

Subfamily of New World monkeys

The titis, or titi monkeys, are New World monkeys of the subfamily Callicebinae, which contains three extant genera: Cheracebus, Callicebus, and Plecturocebus. This subfamily also contains the extinct genera Miocallicebus, Homunculus, and Carlocebus.

Titi monkeys live in South America, from Colombia, Ecuador and Peru, east through Brazil, and south to Bolivia and northern Paraguay.

== Description ==
Depending on species, titis have a head and body length of 23–46 centimetres (9.1–18.1 in), and a tail, which is longer than the head and body, of 26–56 centimetres (10–22 in). The different titi species vary substantially in coloring, but resemble each other in most other physical ways. They have long, soft fur, and it is usually reddish, brownish, grayish or blackish, and in most species the underside is lighter or more reddish than the upperside. Some species have contrasting blackish or whitish foreheads, while all members of the genus Cheracebus have a white half-collar. The tail is always furry and is not prehensile.

== Behaviour ==
Diurnal and arboreal, titis predominantly prefer dense forests near water. They easily jump from branch to branch, earning them their German name, Springaffen (jumping monkeys). They sleep at night, but can also take a midday nap.

Titis are territorial. They live in family groups that consist of parents and their offspring, about two to seven animals in total. They defend their territory by shouting and chasing off intruders but rarely engage in actual fighting. Their grooming and communication is important for the co-operation of the group. They can typically be seen in pairs sitting or sleeping with tails entwined.

The diet of the titis consists mainly of fruits, although they also eat leaves, flowers, insects, bird eggs and small vertebrates.

Titis are monogamous, mating for life. The female bears a single young after about a five-month gestation. Twins occur rarely, having been documented in only 1.4% of all births in captive groups of Plecturocebus moloch. While the second infant usually does not survive, cases where neighbouring groups have adopted infants are known, suggesting that twins may be reared successfully under certain circumstances. Often it is the father who cares for the young, carrying it and bringing it to the mother only for nursing. Fathers tend to engage in more grooming, food-sharing, inspecting, aggression and playing with infants than mothers. The young are weaned after 5 months and are fully grown after two years. After three or more years, they leave their family group in order to find a mate. While the life expectancy of most species is unclear, the members of the genus Cheracebus may live for up to 12 years in the wild, while members of the P. moloch group have been known to live for more than 25 years in captivity.

They make elaborate, powerful vocal duets used in long-range communication.

== Classification ==
The number of known species of titis has doubled in recent years, with eight, P. stephennashi, P. bernhardi, P. caquetensis, P. aureipalatii, P. miltoni, P. urubambensis, P. grovesi, and P. parecis being described from the Amazon basin since 2000. Furthermore, the most recent review uses the phylogenetic species concept (thereby not recognizing the concept of subspecies) rather than the 'traditional' biological species concept. The classification presented here is therefore very different from the classifications used twenty years ago.

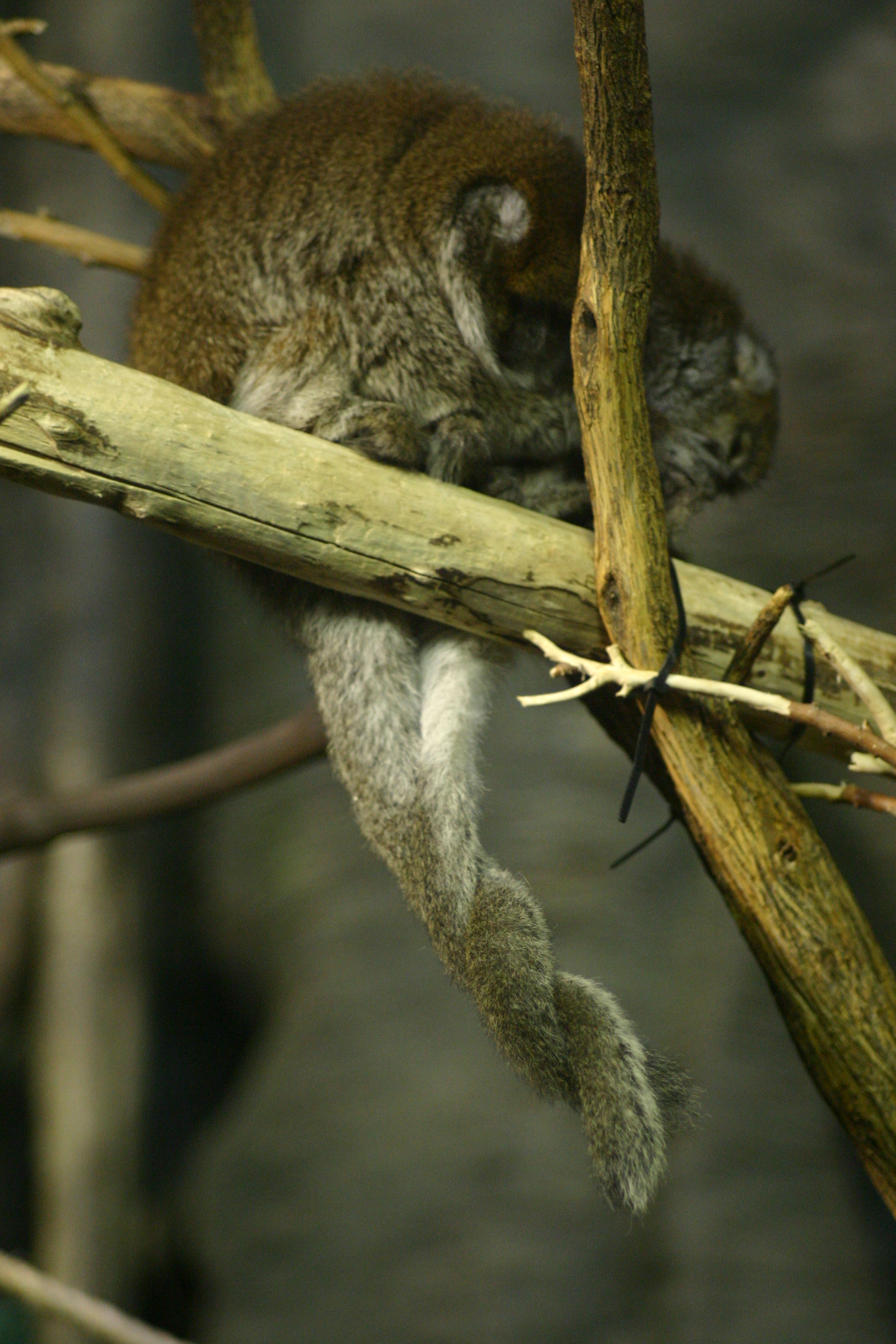
A pair of white-eared titis (P. donacophilus) entwining tails.

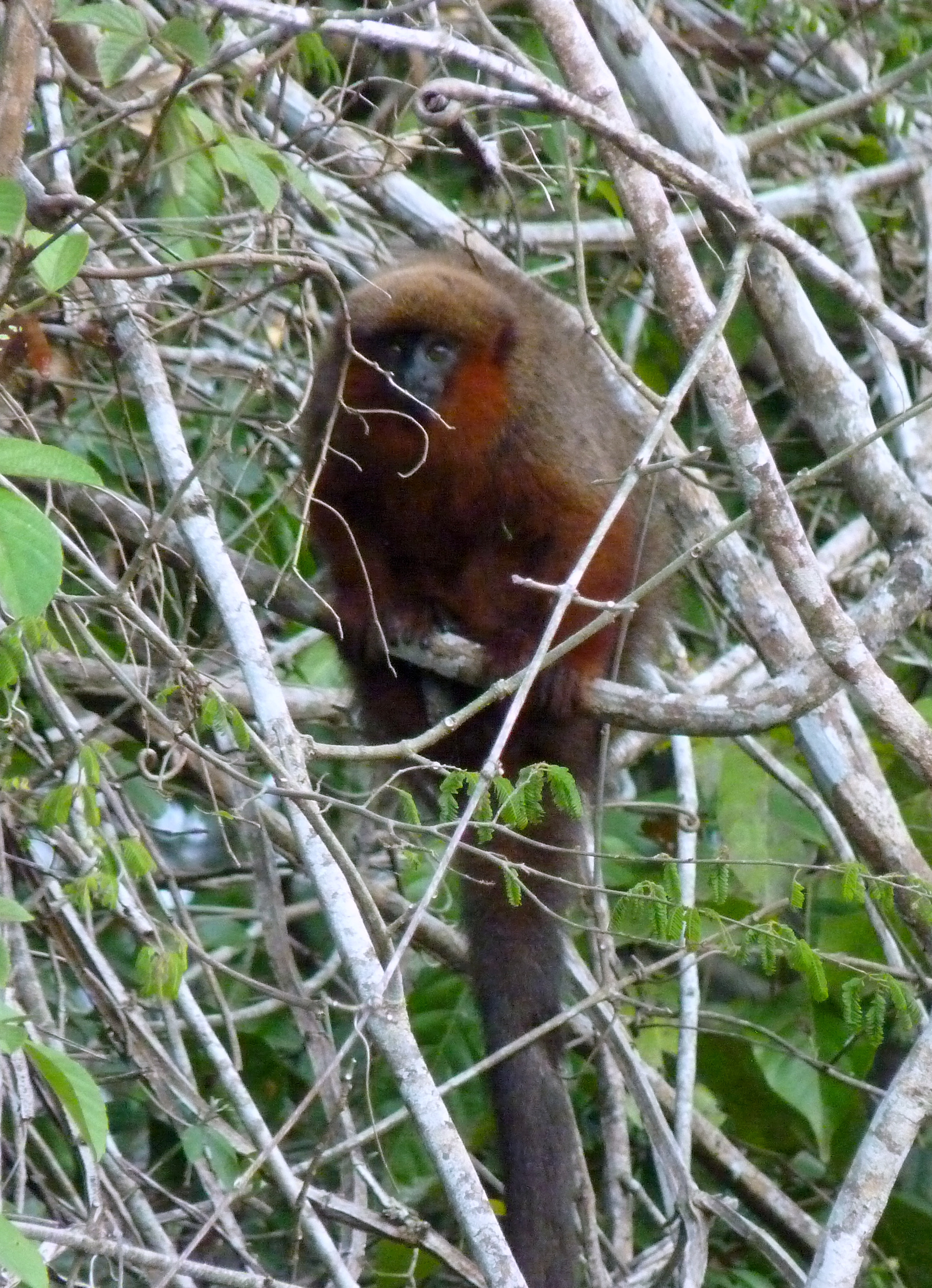
A Madidi titi monkey (Plecturocebus aureipalatii).

Historically, titis were monogeneric and formed the genus Callicebus Thomas, 1903. Owing to the great diversity found across titi monkey species, a new genus-level taxonomy was recently proposed that recognises three genera within the subfamily Callicebinae; Cheracebus Byrne et al. (2016) for the species of the torquatus group (Widow titis); Callicebus Thomas, 1903, for species of the Atlantic Forest personatus group; and Plecturocebus Byrne et al. (2016) for the Amazonian and Chaco titis of the moloch and donacophilus groups. The naming rights to a recently discovered species were auctioned off in 2006, (with the funds going to a nonprofit organization), and the winner was the online casino GoldenPalace.com, as reflected in both the common and scientific name of P. aureipalatii. While this typically is a highly unusual event in scientific classification, the possibility of naming a species of titi in exchange for a sizable donation to a nonprofit foundation was also presented a few years before, resulting in P. bernhardi being named after Prince Bernhard of the Netherlands.

- Genus Plecturocebus
  - P. donacophilus group
    - White-eared titi, Plecturocebus donacophilus
    - Rio Beni titi, Plecturocebus modestus
    - Rio Mayo titi, Plecturocebus oenanthe
    - Ollala brothers's titi, Plecturocebus olallae
    - White-coated titi, Plecturocebus pallescens
    - Urubamba brown titi, Plecturocebus urubambensis
  - P. moloch group
    - Baptista Lake titi, Plecturocebus baptista
    - Prince Bernhard's titi, Plecturocebus bernhardi
    - Brown titi, Plecturocebus brunneus
    - Ashy black titi, Plecturocebus cinerascens
    - Parecis titi, Plecturocebus parecis
    - Hoffmanns's titi, Plecturocebus hoffmannsi
    - Alta Floresta titi, Plecturocebus grovesi
    - Milton's titi, Plecturocebus miltoni
    - Red-bellied titi, Plecturocebus moloch
    - Vieira's titi, Plecturocebus vieirai
    - Toppin's titi, Plecturocebus toppini
    - Madidi titi, Plecturocebus aureipalatii
    - Chestnut-bellied titi, Plecturocebus caligatus
    - Caquetá titi, Plecturocebus caquetensis
    - Coppery titi, Plecturocebus cupreus
    - White-tailed titi, Plecturocebus discolor
    - Hershkovitz's titi, Plecturocebus dubius
    - Ornate titi, Plecturocebus ornatus
    - Stephen Nash's titi, Plecturocebus stephennashi
- Genus Cheracebus
  - Lucifer titi, Cheracebus lucifer
  - Black titi, Cheracebus lugens
  - Colombian black-handed titi, Cheracebus medemi
  - Red-headed titi, Cheracebus regulus
  - Collared titi, Cheracebus torquatus
- Genus Callicebus
  - Barbara Brown's titi, Callicebus barbarabrownae
  - Coimbra Filho's titi, Callicebus coimbrai
  - Coastal black-handed titi, Callicebus melanochir
  - Black-fronted titi, Callicebus nigrifrons
  - Atlantic titi, Callicebus personatus
- Genus †Miocallicebus
  - †Miocallicebus villaviejai
- Genus †Carlocebus
  - †Carlocebus carmenensis
  - †Carlocebus intermedius
- Genus †Homunculus
  - †Homunculus patagonicus
  - †Homunculus vizcainoi
