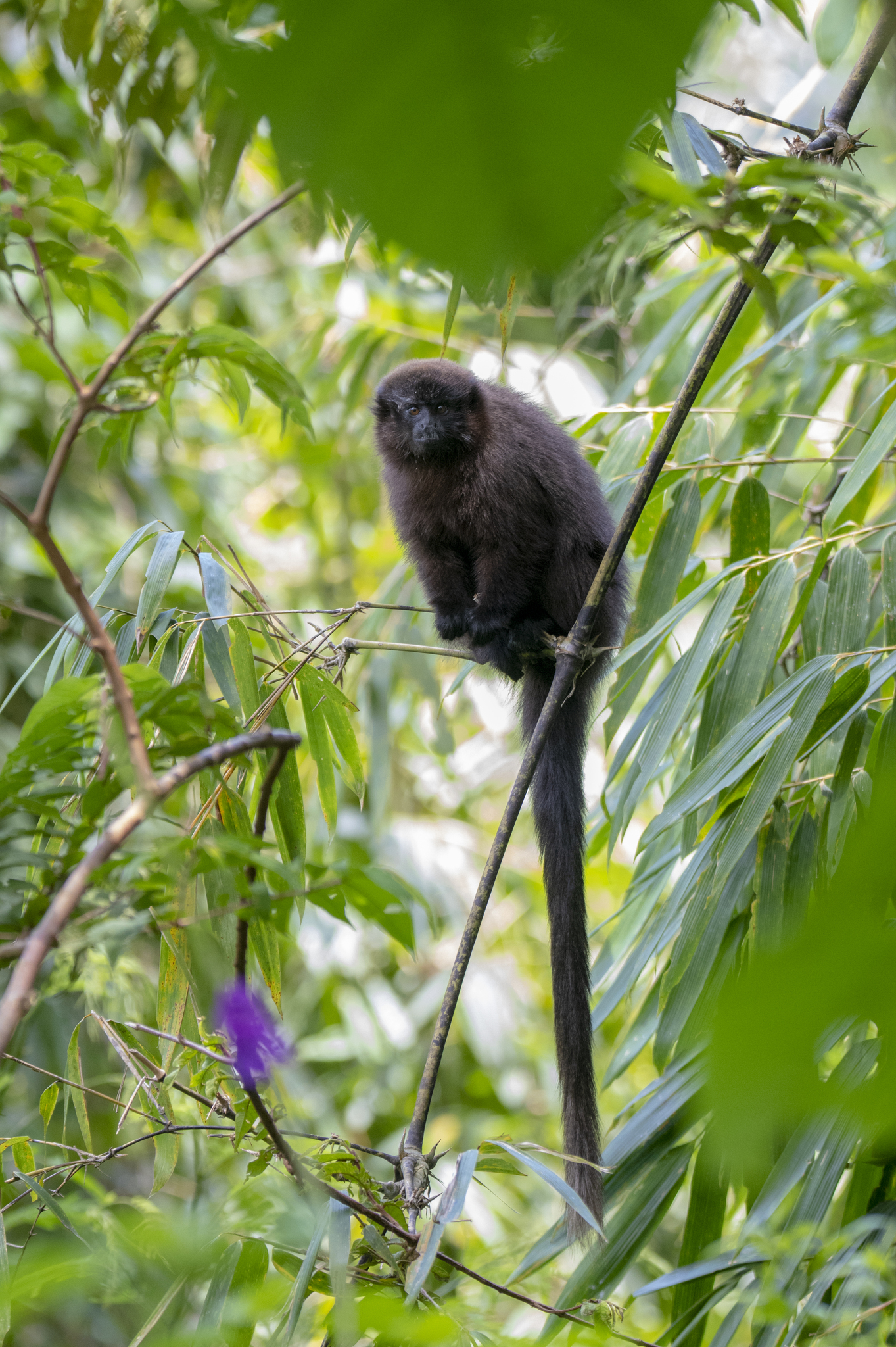

Conservation status
- Least Concern (IUCN 3.1)

Scientific classification
- Kingdom: Animalia
- Phylum: Chordata
- Class: Mammalia
- Order: Primates
- Suborder: Haplorhini
- Family: Pitheciidae
- Genus: Plecturocebus
- Species: P. urubambensis

Binomial name
- Plecturocebus urubambensis (Vermeer & Tello-Alvarado, 2015)

Synonyms
- Callicebus urubambensis

= Urubamba brown titi monkey =

Species of New World monkey

The Urubamba brown titi monkey (Plecturocebus urubambensis) is a species of titi monkey, a type of New World monkey, endemic to Peru.

== Taxonomy ==
Populations in this species were formerly classified within the brown titi (P. brunneus), but a 2015 study found it to be a distinct, undescribed species that also belonged in a different species group of Plecturocebus from P. brunneus (the P. donacophilus group), and thus described it as P. urubambensis. The results of this study were followed by the IUCN Red List, ITIS, and American Society of Mammalogists.

== Distribution ==
This species is endemic to Peru, where it is found east of the Tambo River and west of the Urubamba, Manú, and Madre de Dios rivers.

== Description ==
This species is not as grizzled as P. brunneus, and also has a varying amount of black on the head.
