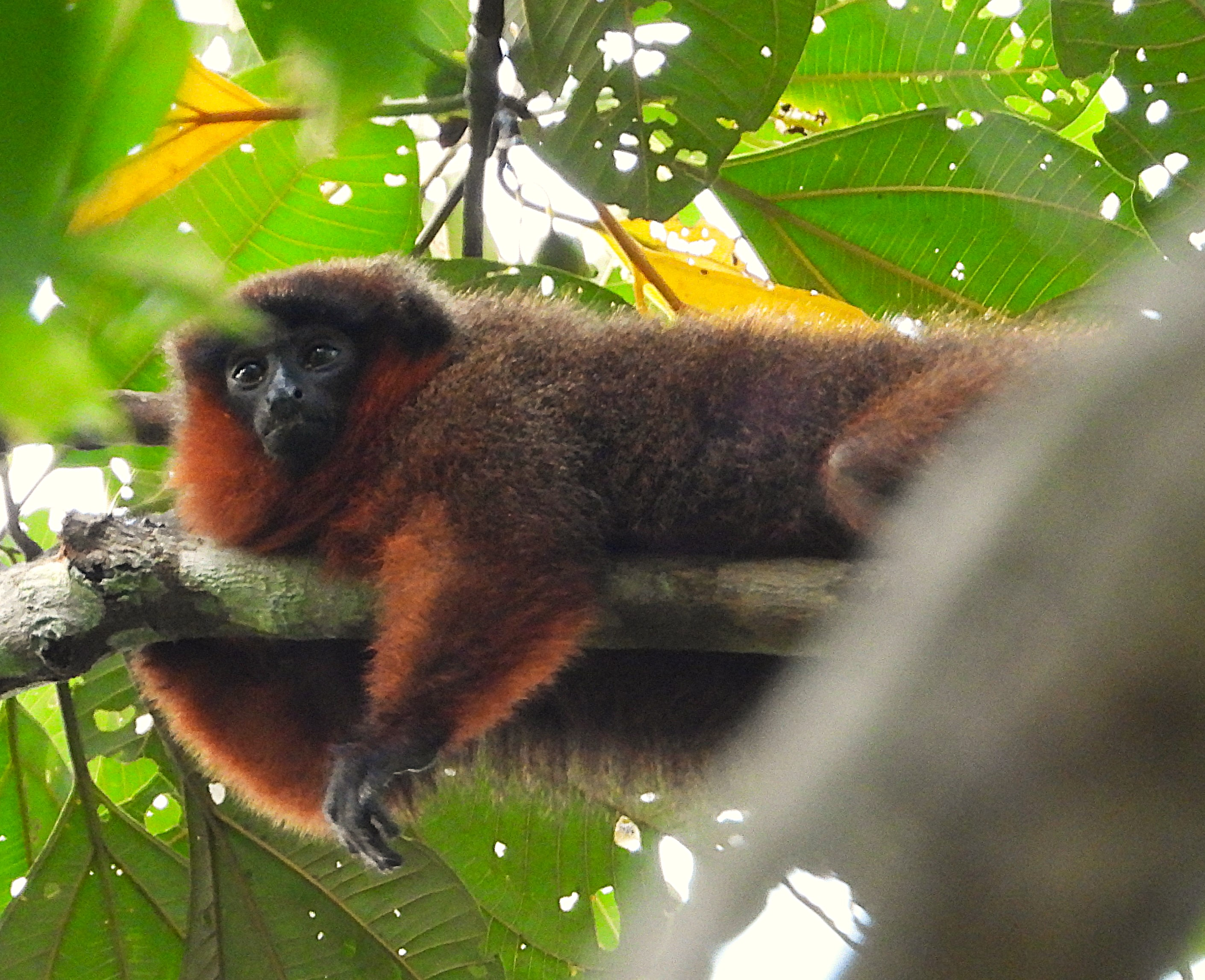

Conservation status
- Least Concern (IUCN 3.1)

Scientific classification
- Kingdom: Animalia
- Phylum: Chordata
- Class: Mammalia
- Infraclass: Placentalia
- Order: Primates
- Family: Pitheciidae
- Genus: Plecturocebus
- Species: P. caligatus

Binomial name
- Plecturocebus caligatus (Wagner, 1842)
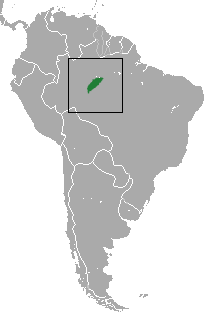
- Chestnut-bellied Titi range

Synonyms
- Callicebus caligatus Wagner, 1842

= Chestnut-bellied titi monkey =

Chestnut-bellied titi

Species of New World monkey

The chestnut-bellied titi monkey (Plecturocebus caligatus), also called booted titi, is a species of titi monkey, a type of New World monkey, endemic to Brazil. It was originally described as Callicebus caligatus in 1842.
