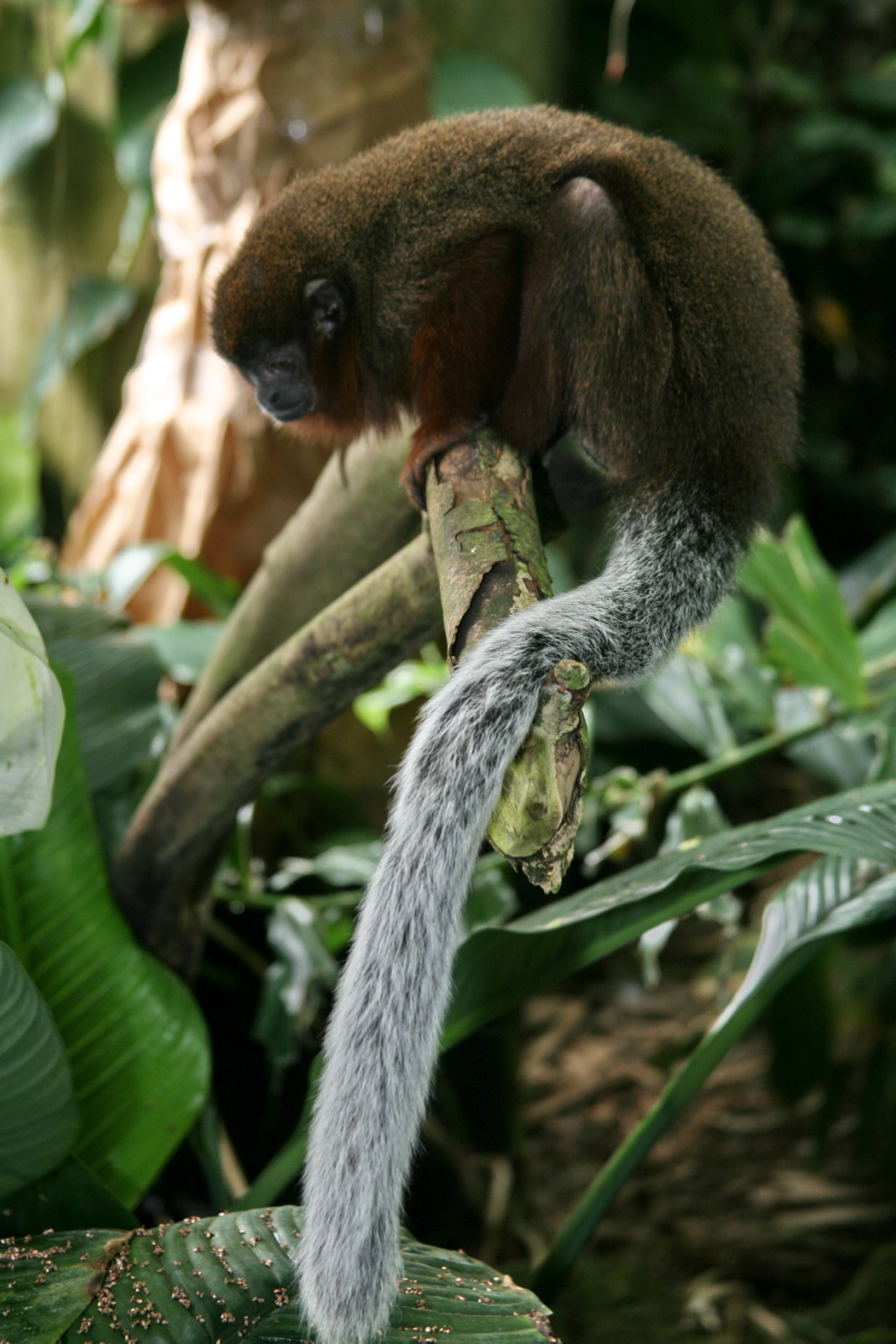
- Brown titi (Plecturocebus brunneus)

Scientific classification
- Kingdom: Animalia
- Phylum: Chordata
- Class: Mammalia
- Order: Primates
- Family: Pitheciidae
- Subfamily: Callicebinae
- Genus: Plecturocebus; Byrne, Rylands, Carneiro, Lynch Alfaro, Bertuol, da Silva, Messias, Groves, Mittermeier, Farias, Hrbek, Schneider, Sampaio & Boubli, 2016

Type species
- Cebus moloch Hoffmannsegg, 1807

Species
- See text.

= Plecturocebus =

Genus of New World monkeys

Plecturocebus is one of three genera of titi monkeys.

Historically, titi monkeys were considered monogeneric, being placed in a single genus: Callicebus Thomas, 1903. Owing to the great diversity found across titi monkey species, a new genus-level taxonomy was proposed in 2016 that recognises three genera within the subfamily Callicebinae; Plecturocebus Byrne et al., 2016 for the Amazonian and Chaco titis of the moloch and donacophilus groups; Cheracebus Byrne et al., 2016 for the species of the torquatus group (Widow titis); and Callicebus Thomas, 1903 sensu stricto, for species of the Atlantic Forest personatus group.

Plecturocebus is derived from the Latin forms of three Greek words: plektos, meaning twist or plait, oura, meaning tail, and kebos, meaning long-tailed monkey. All together, this refers to the behavior of many titi monkeys to intertwine their tails when they sit next to each other.

== Species ==
There are 25 species in this genus:

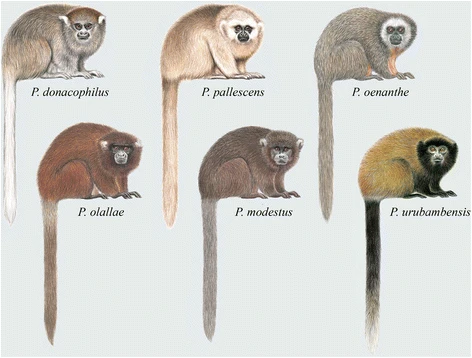
Plecturocebus donacophilus group species

- P. donacophilus group
  - White-eared titi monkey, Plecturocebus donacophilus
  - Rio Beni titi monkey, Plecturocebus modestus
  - Rio Mayo titi monkey, Plecturocebus oenanthe
  - Olalla brothers' titi monkey, Plecturocebus olallae
  - White-coated titi monkey, Plecturocebus pallescens
  - Urubamba brown titi monkey, Plecturocebus urubambensis

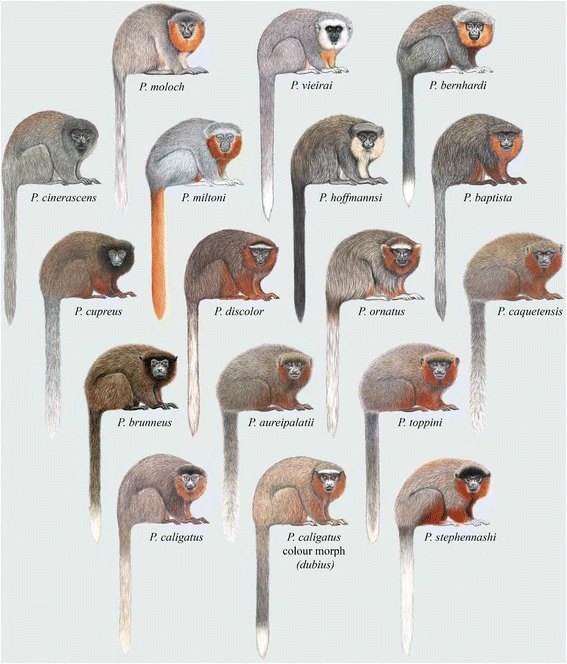
Plecturocebus moloch group species

- P. moloch group
  - Madidi titi monkey, Plecturocebus aureipalatii
  - Baptista Lake titi monkey, Plecturocebus baptista
  - Prince Bernhard's titi monkey, Plecturocebus bernhardi
  - Brown titi monkey, Plecturocebus brunneus
  - Chestnut-bellied titi monkey, Plecturocebus caligatus
  - Caquetá titi monkey, Plecturocebus caquetensis
  - Ashy black titi monkey, Plecturocebus cinerascens
  - Coppery titi monkey, Plecturocebus cupreus
  - White-tailed titi monkey, Plecturocebus discolor
  - Hershkovitz's titi monkey, Plecturocebus dubius
  - Alta Floresta titi monkey, Plecturocebus grovesi
  - Hoffmanns's titi monkey, Plecturocebus hoffmannsi
  - Milton's titi monkey, Plecturocebus miltoni
  - Red-bellied titi monkey, Plecturocebus moloch
  - Ornate titi monkey, Plecturocebus ornatus
  - Parecis titi monkey, Plecturocebus parecis
  - Stephen Nash's titi monkey, Plecturocebus stephennashi
  - Toppin's titi monkey, Plecturocebus toppini
  - Vieira's titi monkey, Plecturocebus vieirai
