= Hershkovitz's titi monkey =

Hershkovitz's titi

Conservation status
- Least Concern (IUCN 3.1)

Scientific classification
- Kingdom: Animalia
- Phylum: Chordata
- Class: Mammalia
- Infraclass: Placentalia
- Order: Primates
- Family: Pitheciidae
- Genus: Plecturocebus
- Species: P. dubius

Binomial name
- Plecturocebus dubius (Hershkovitz, 1988)
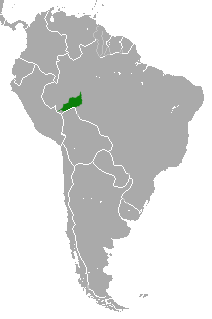
- Hershkovitz's titi range

Synonyms
- Callicebus dubius Hershkovitz, 1988

Species of New World monkey

Hershkovitz's titi monkey (Plecturocebus dubius) is a species of titi monkey, a type of New World monkey, from South America. It is found in Bolivia, Brazil, and Peru. The common name is in reference to American zoologist Philip Hershkovitz, who described the species as Callicebus dubius in 1988.

== Taxonomy ==
Hershkovitz's titi monkey is a South American primate classified under the family Pitheciidae. The species was originally classified as Callicebus dubius by Philip Hershkovitz in 1988. However, taxonomic revisions have reclassified the species in the genus Plecturocebus.

Modern phylogenetic research has shown that the former genus Callicebus was paraphyletic, and was therefore split into multiple genera, including Plecturocebus.

Phylogenetic studies have also examined relationships among closely related taxa and have identified uncertainty in species-level boundaries within some lineages. As a result, the classification of Plecturocebus dubius has been subject to ongoing refinement based on both genetic data and geographic distribution patterns.

== Morphology ==
Hershkovitz's titi monkey shares the general morphological traits typical of the genus Plecturocebus. Members of this genus are small to medium-sized primates with dense, soft fur and relatively long, non-prehensile tails.

Titi monkeys commonly display low sexual dimorphism, with males and females appearing similar in overall body size and external characteristics. Their pelage typically includes gray, brown, or reddish tones, but coloration varies among species within the genus.

These morphological traits are associated with an arboreal lifestyle, which includes movement through dense forest vegetation and a heavy reliance on balance rather than grasping with their tail.

== Range and habitat ==
=== Range ===
Hershkovitz's titi monkey is found in western Amazonia, with confirmed populations in Bolivia, Brazil, and Peru. Its distribution falls under the broader range of titi monkeys found all across South America, but particularly in regions south of the Amazon River and west of the Brazilian cerrado.

Its geographic distribution is largely lowland Amazonian forest systems, due to the impact of natural barriers such as large river systems and elevation gradients. These natural barriers may contribute to dispersal, but also contribute to species differentiation across the region.

Because titi monkey taxonomy and distribution are under active study, the precise boundaries of their range have yet to be determined.

=== Habitat ===
Hershkovitz's titi monkey habitat includes forests and swampy areas near rivers and lakes. Like other titi monkeys, it travels arboreally and is rarely seen traversing on the forest floor.

Titi monkeys prefer dense vegetation, often inhabiting forest edges, secondary growth forests, and regions near streams, rivers, and wetlands. The species typically inhabits the lower levels of the forest canopy, where it moves via quadrupedal locomotion and leaping. However, if provided with sufficient vegetation cover, the titi monkeys may also appear in fragmented or disturbed habitats. When feeding, individuals will sit vertically while perched on a branch or trunk.

Hershkovitz's titi monkeys prefer a low-canopy forest near rivers and wetlands, where dense vegetation enables movement, supports feeding activity, and provides concealment from predators during resting periods.

== Ecology ==
Hershkovitz's titi monkey is primarily arboreal and diurnal. Their daily activities are structured around two major feeding periods, one in the morning and one in the afternoon, which are separated by a midday nap. They are active from sunrise until around sunset.

Hershkovitz's titi monkey occupies relatively small home ranges and, compared to other primates, has a very limited travel day range or daily path length. Its daily movement is heavily motivated by resource availability, and even further reduced ranging during periods of food scarcity or due to forest degradation.

The species lives sympatrically with numerous other primate species, but tends to avoid direct interactions with them. It also shares its habitat and environment with a variety of predators. Raptors are a primary predator of titi monkeys; however, they face additional threats from arboreal snakes, felids, and occasionally other primates. This is why there is a heavy reliance on dense vegetation and limiting daily movement for reducing detection.

== Food and eating habits ==
The species is predominantly frugivorous, with fruit contributing to the majority of their diet. However, leaves, seeds, and small invertebrates are usually supplemented into their diets whenever there is seasonal variation. During a period of low fruit availability, the species will fall back on leaf consumption. Hershkovitz's titi monkeys (Plecturocebus dubius) have been observed eating a wide range of plant species, as well as unripe fruit and insects, which are typically eaten opportunistically rather than being actively hunted.

Their feeding activity occurs throughout the day but is usually concentrated at times early in the morning or late in the afternoon, with a rest period between meals. Due to their largely plant-based diet, a large portion of their daily activity is dedicated to resting. Foraging often occurs with small social groups in short trees that have a concentrated food source. This allows individuals to remain stationary while they forage and minimize competition.

== Sleep habits ==
Hershkovitz's titi monkey is a diurnal primate. Its activity patterns vary seasonally, with individuals becoming active earlier during periods of high fruit availability and remaining at sleeping sites during longer periods of reduced resources.

This species typically sleeps in dense vegetation high in the canopy, often within vine 'nests' on small branches. These sites are specifically chosen due to their provided concealment from predators and can be reused across multiple nights. Although variation in sleeping sites has been observed, they are generally located well within their home ranges rather than on the outskirts of their boundaries.

Individuals often sleep in small groups in close physical proximity to one another. A specific characteristic behavior observed during rest periods and sleeping is tail twining. This is behavior associated with social bonding and cohesion, where individuals will intertwine their tails during rest. Infants will typically remains in proximity with their caregivers during rest periods as well.

As well as their nighttime rest, there is a period of rest that occurs in the middle of the day. This typically occurs between morning and afternoon foraging, which reflects the species' energy balance, needing extended resting periods to assist with their largely plant-based diet.

== Social structure ==
Hershkovitz's titi monkey typically lives in small, cohesive social groups that are composed of a monogamous adult pair and their offspring. Group sizes generally range from two to seven individuals; however, variation in group composition has been observed. Groups are characterized by their strong pair bonds, adult mates maintaining proximity to one another, and coordinating their daily activities.

Social behavior plays a central role in maintaining social cohesion. Some of these behaviors include grooming, huddling, and tail twining. Pair bonds are highly developed, where individuals may exhibit signs of extreme distress when separated from their mate.

Hershkovitz's titi monkey is remarkably territorial and maintains a relatively small home range. Vocal communication is vital to territorial defense and coordinating groups to signal occupancy over a boundary and deter other neighboring groups. Direct physical conflict is rarely observed, with most interactions being limited to vocal exchanges or display behaviors.

Infant dispersal typically occurs between the ages of two and four, where individuals depart from their familial unit and either establish or join a new social unit. Within groups, dominance hierarchies are not strongly expressed, and social interactions are heavily characterized by cooperation and a stable pair-based organization.

== Reproduction and development ==
Hershkovitz's titi monkeys (Plecturocebus dubius) are monogamous, pair-bonding primates that typically produce a single offspring per birthing cycle. The gestation period is estimated at 128-160 days, with births occurring throughout the year. However, seasonal peaks have been observed in certain populations.

Females can reproduce when they reach around the age of two. However, first births may occur later in development depending on social conditions or dispersal from their natal group. Interbirth intervals average around a year, and mating generally occurs within their established pairs. Occasionally, extra-pair copulations have been observed but considered highly uncommon.

Parental care within the species is notable for the high level of male involvement. The males serve as the primary caregivers, carrying the infant for the majority of the day except while nursing. This paternal investment pattern is a defining characteristic of the species' social structure and contributes to the strength of their pair-bonds. The mother primarily provides nursing for her infant and then will decrease their direct contact as the infant develops.

Infants are extremely vulnerable, covered in fur, and only capable of clinging to a caregiver at birth. Early development is indicated by close physical contact with the father, and a gradual increase in independence within the first several months of life. Infants will begin to explore independently within the first few months and slowly transition to solid food as they develop further. Weaning will occur within the first several months, after which juveniles will increasingly engage in more social interaction and locomotor activity.

Dispersal from the natal group typically occurs between the ages of two and four, and functions as a transition into reproductive maturity and integrating into new social groups.

== Conservation ==
Hershkovitz's titi monkey is currently classified as Least Concern; however, the species still faces ongoing threats related to human activity. The most prominent threats are habitat loss driven by deforestation, agricultural expansion, logging, and infrastructure development. Additionally, improvement projects and new road construction in parts of the species' home range will increase human access to previously remote parts of the forest and accelerate habitat degradation and fragmentation.

Although Hershkovitz's titi monkey has shown some tolerance to disturbed environments, continued fragmentation can reduce the long-term viability of the population. Habitat fragmentation poses detrimental threats, such as isolating populations and limiting the dispersal of reproductive opportunities. Conservation efforts have been focused on protecting the remaining forest habitats and restoring natural pathways that connect isolated populations.

Hunting also poses a localized threat to the species. In some areas, titi monkeys are captured for the pet trade, as well as hunted for human consumption. While these threats are not currently considered severe enough to place the species at Near Threatened, continued habitat degradation and human encroachment into their habitats may pose an increasing challenge for the future of this species.
