= Rio Beni titi monkey =

Rio Beni titi

Conservation status
- Endangered (IUCN 3.1)

Scientific classification
- Kingdom: Animalia
- Phylum: Chordata
- Class: Mammalia
- Infraclass: Placentalia
- Order: Primates
- Family: Pitheciidae
- Genus: Plecturocebus
- Species: P. modestus

Binomial name
- Plecturocebus modestus (Lönnberg, 1939)
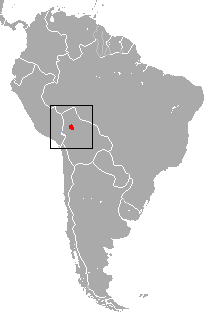
- Rio Beni Titi range

Synonyms
- Callicebus modestus Lönnberg, 1939

Species of New World monkey

Rio Beni titi monkey (Plecturocebus modestus) is a species of titi monkey, a type of New World monkey, endemic to Bolivia.
