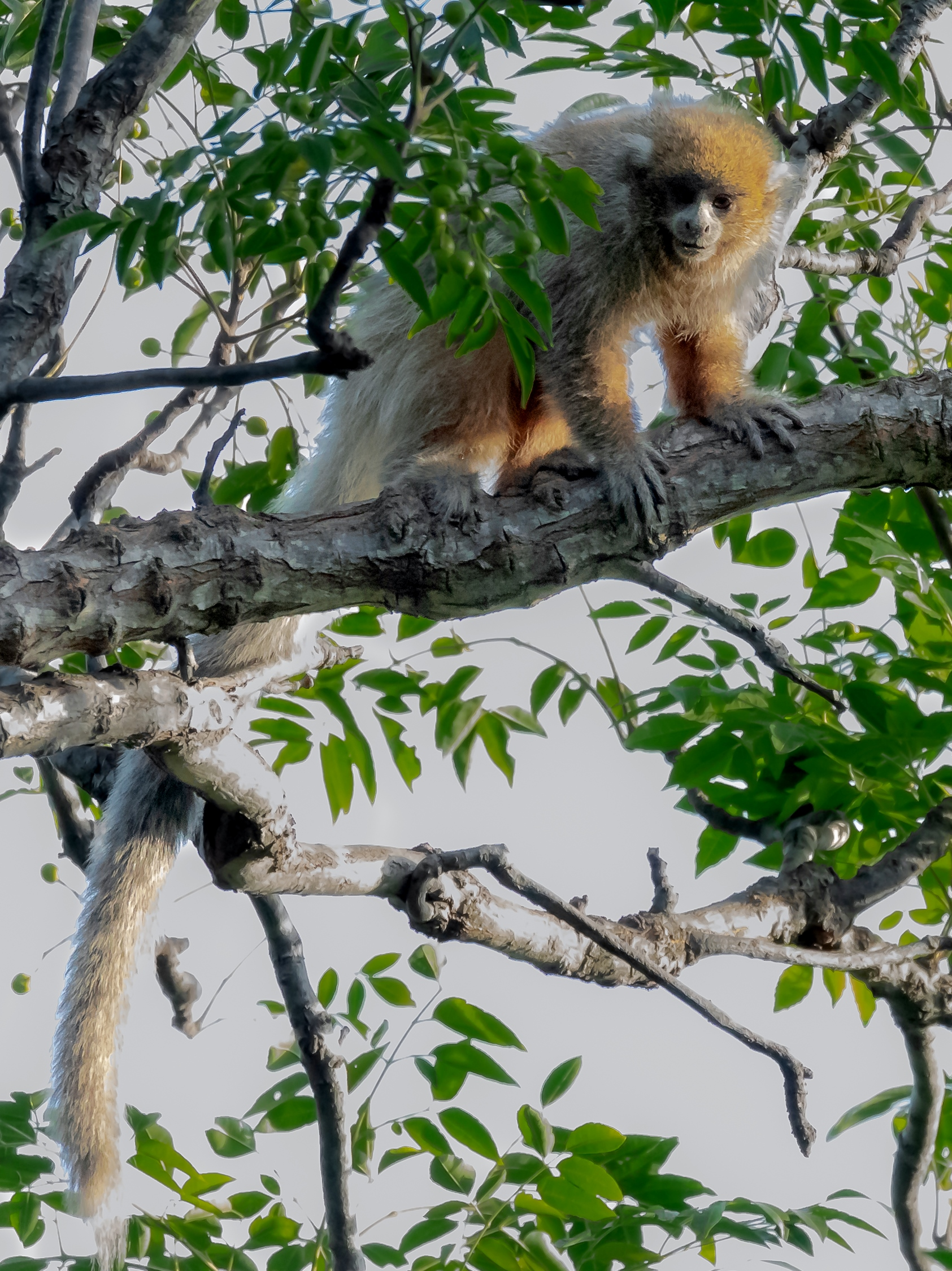

Conservation status
- Least Concern (IUCN 3.1)

Scientific classification
- Kingdom: Animalia
- Phylum: Chordata
- Class: Mammalia
- Infraclass: Placentalia
- Order: Primates
- Family: Pitheciidae
- Genus: Plecturocebus
- Species: P. pallescens

Binomial name
- Plecturocebus pallescens (Thomas, 1907)
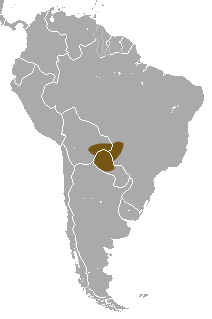
- White-coated Titi range

Synonyms
- Callicebus pallescens Thomas, 1907

= White-coated titi monkey =

White-coated titi

Species of New World monkey

The white-coated titi monkey (Plecturocebus pallescens) is a species of titi monkey, a type of New World monkey, from South America. It is found in Bolivia, Brazil, and Paraguay.
