= Stephen Nash's titi monkey =

Stephen Nash's titi

Conservation status
- Data Deficient (IUCN 3.1)

Scientific classification
- Kingdom: Animalia
- Phylum: Chordata
- Class: Mammalia
- Infraclass: Placentalia
- Order: Primates
- Family: Pitheciidae
- Genus: Plecturocebus
- Species: P. stephennashi

Binomial name
- Plecturocebus stephennashi (van Roosmalen, van Roosmalen and Mittermeier, 2002)
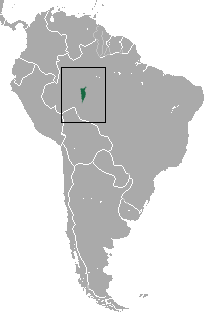
- Stephen Nash's titi range

Synonyms
- Callicebus stephennashi van Roosmalen, van Roosmalen and Mittermeier, 2002

Species of New World monkey

Stephen Nash's titi monkey (Plecturocebus stephennashi), also known as just Nash's titi or Stephen Nash's monkey, is a species of titi monkey, a type of New World monkey, endemic to the eastern bank of the Purus River in Brazil. It was discovered by Marc van Roosmalen in 2001 when local fishermen brought specimens to his breeding center. It was described in 2002. It was named in honor of Stephen D. Nash, an illustrator for Conservation International, the organization that funded van Roosmalen's work. The monkey is largely silver with a black forehead and red sideburns and chest, as well as on the underside of the species' limbs. It is 28 inches long, although 17 inches is taken up by the titi's tail.
