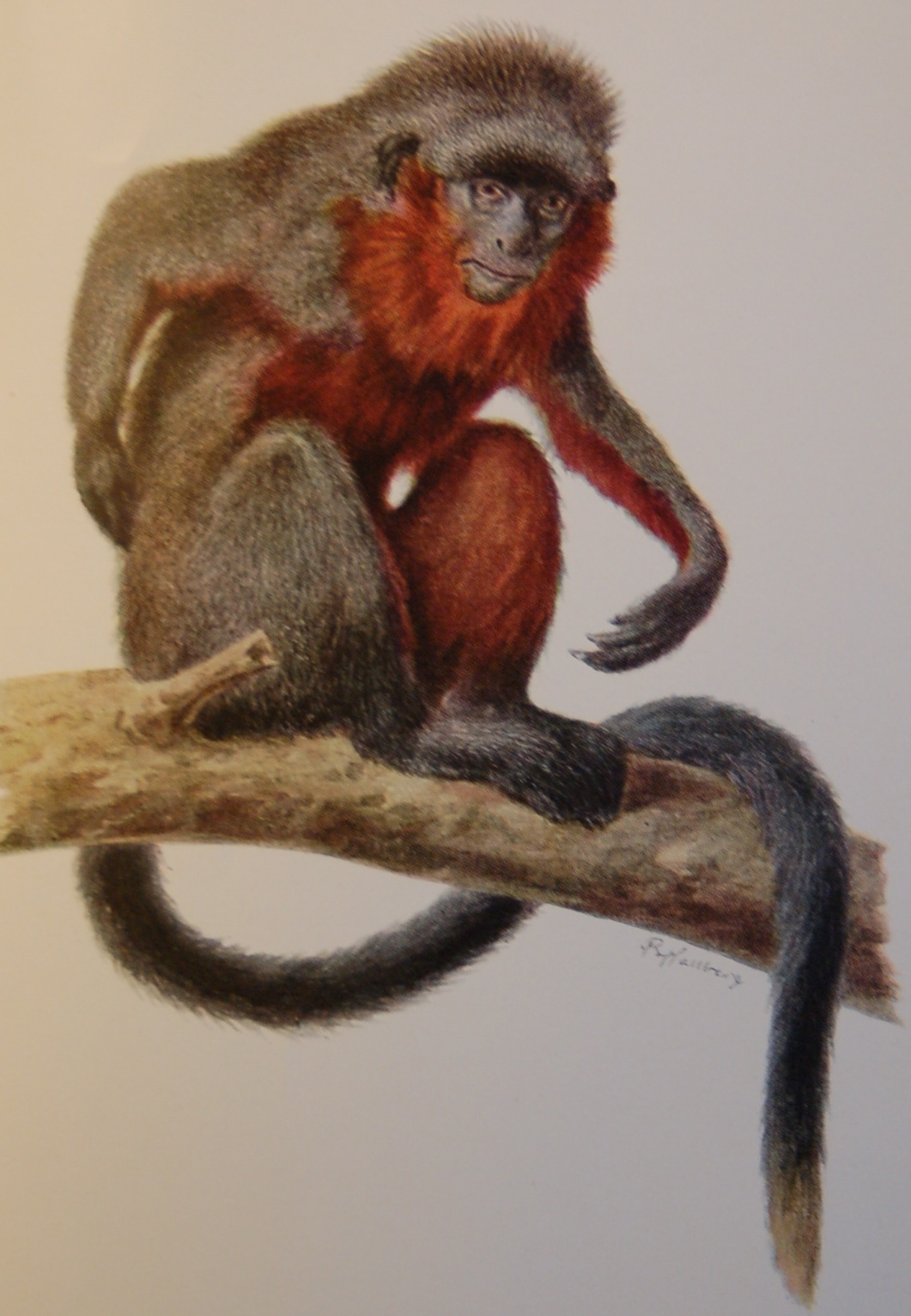

Conservation status
- Least Concern (IUCN 3.1)

Scientific classification
- Kingdom: Animalia
- Phylum: Chordata
- Class: Mammalia
- Infraclass: Placentalia
- Order: Primates
- Family: Pitheciidae
- Genus: Plecturocebus
- Species: P. baptista

Binomial name
- Plecturocebus baptista (Lönnberg, 1939)
- Geographic range

Synonyms
- Callicebus baptista Lönnberg, 1939

= Baptista Lake titi monkey =

Baptista Lake titi

Species of New World monkey

The Baptista Lake titi monkey (Plecturocebus baptista) is a species of titi monkey, a type of New World monkey, endemic to Brazil. It was originally described as Callicebus baptista in 1939.
