= Olalla brothers' titi monkey =

Ollala brothers's titi

Conservation status
- Critically Endangered (IUCN 3.1)

Scientific classification
- Kingdom: Animalia
- Phylum: Chordata
- Class: Mammalia
- Order: Primates
- Family: Pitheciidae
- Genus: Plecturocebus
- Species: P. olallae

Binomial name
- Plecturocebus olallae (Lönnberg, 1939)
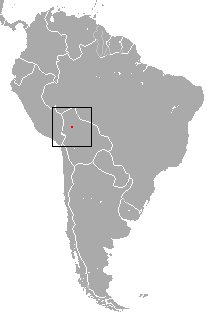
- Olalla brothers' titi range

Synonyms
- Callicebus olallae

Species of New World monkey

The Olalla brothers's titi monkey (Plecturocebus olallae) is a species of titi monkey, a type of New World monkey, endemic to Bolivia. There are between 110 and 150 individuals in the wild.
