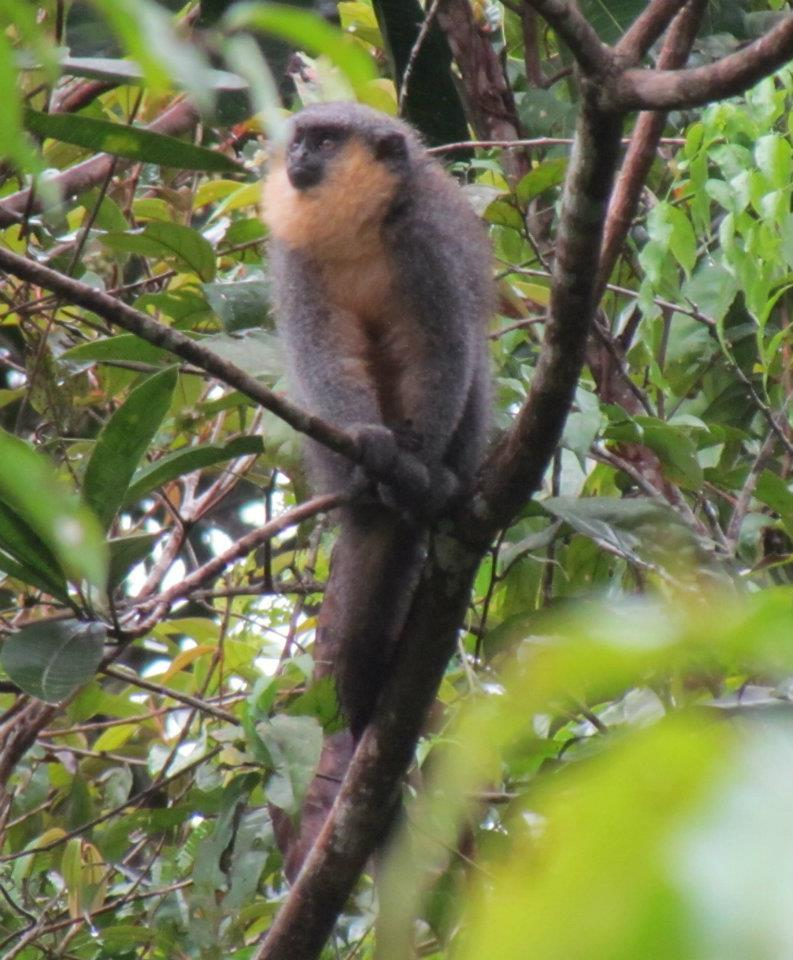

Conservation status
- Least Concern (IUCN 3.1)

Scientific classification
- Kingdom: Animalia
- Phylum: Chordata
- Class: Mammalia
- Infraclass: Placentalia
- Order: Primates
- Family: Pitheciidae
- Genus: Plecturocebus
- Species: P. hoffmannsi

Binomial name
- Plecturocebus hoffmannsi (Thomas, 1908)
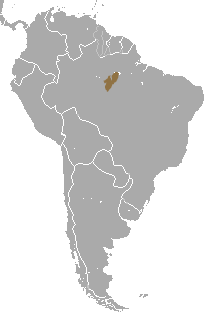
- Hoffmanns's titi range

Synonyms
- Callicebus hoffmannsi Thomas, 1908

= Hoffmanns's titi monkey =

Hoffmanns's titi

Species of New World monkey

Hoffmanns's titi monkey (Plecturocebus hoffmannsi) is a species of titi monkey, a type of New World monkey, endemic to Brazil. It was described as Callicebus hoffmannsi in 1908.
