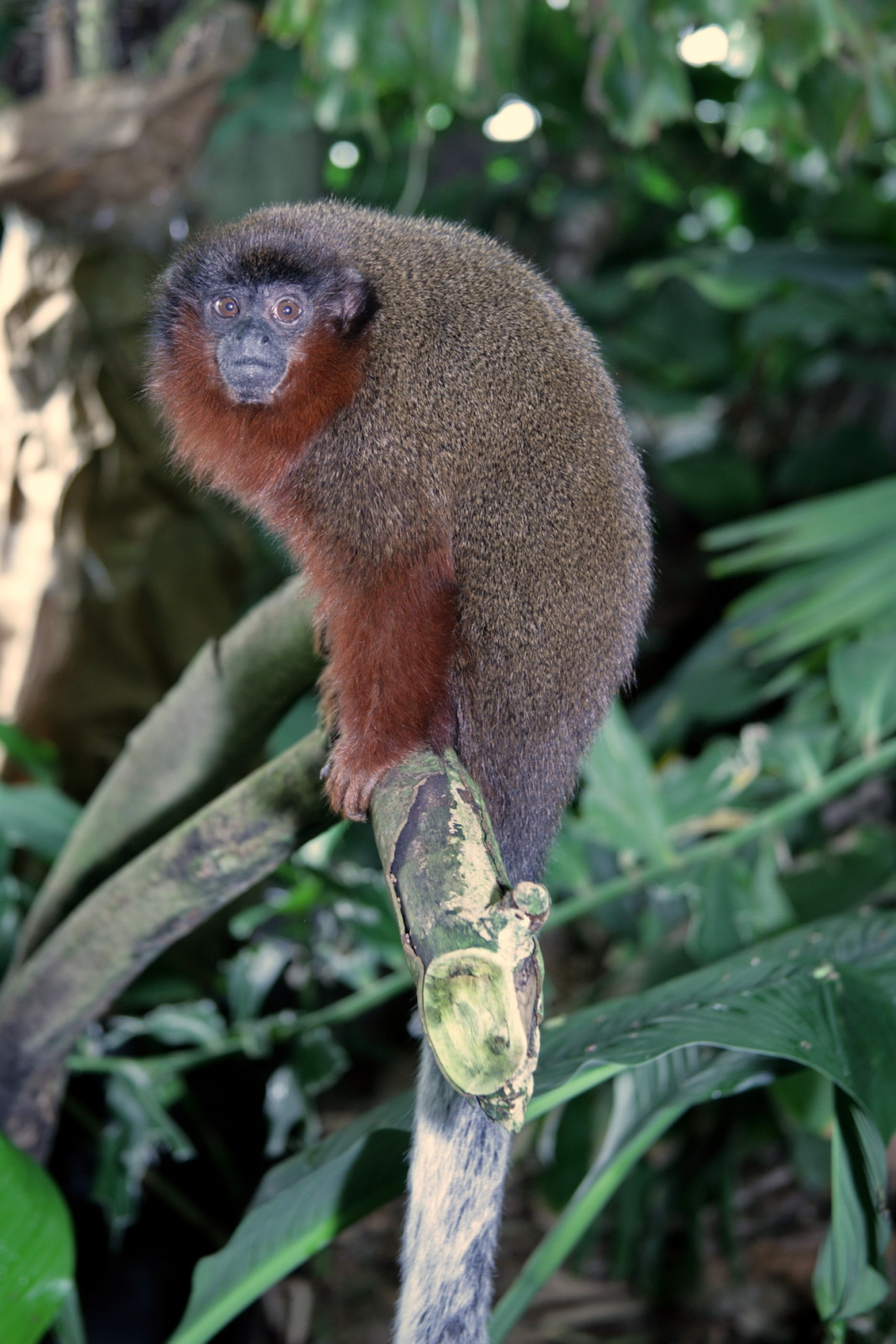
- At the National Zoo

Conservation status
- Vulnerable (IUCN 3.1)

Scientific classification
- Kingdom: Animalia
- Phylum: Chordata
- Class: Mammalia
- Infraclass: Placentalia
- Order: Primates
- Family: Pitheciidae
- Genus: Plecturocebus
- Species: P. brunneus

Binomial name
- Plecturocebus brunneus (Wagner, 1842)
- Geographic range (includes P. urubambensis)

Synonyms
- Callicebus brunneus Wagner, 1842

= Brown titi monkey =

Brown titi

Species of New World monkey

The brown titi monkey (Plecturocebus brunneus) is a species of titi monkey, a type of New World monkey, from South America. It is endemic to Brazil. It was originally described as Callicebus brunneus in 1842 and transferred to the newly erected genus Plecturocebus in 2016.

== Taxonomy ==
Plecturocebus are within a subfamily of titi called Callicebinae. Other genera included within this subfamily are the Cheracebus, Callicebus, and Plecturocebus; which are all still currently extant. The Xenothrix, Antillothrix, Paralouatta, Carlocebus, Lagonimico, and Tremacebus genera of Callicebinae are extinct.

The Urubamba brown titi (P. urubambensis) of Peru was formerly thought to be a Peruvian population of P. brunneus, but a 2015 study found it to be a distinct, undescribed species more closely related to the white-eared titi (P. donacophilus), and described it as such. The Brown Titi was classified as its own genus in 2016. Due to the previous classification before independent definition, P. brunneus is now thought to be endemic to Brazil.

== Biology ==
The Brown Titi do not differ too dramatically from their relatives, however, they are notably unique in their combination of morphological features. Individuals of this species possess a grey agouti colouration on the crown of the head and dorsal parts, a bright red-brown venter, an almost completely black tail with a pale tip, and light yellow colouration of the hair on the cheeks with bright red-brown hair on the sides of the face. Across all titi species, the tail is the same, furry and prehensile. The different species of titi are identifyable by their combination of these morphological traits. This classification is what contributed to P. Brunneus earning the status as its own individual species.

Their diet reflects that of other species of titi. They have a diet consisting of mainly fruits as well as flowers, leaves, insects and small vertebrates.

They are endemic to the Caatinga in Brazil. Titis are territorial and defend their territory by shouting or hollering at the predator or intruder.

Brown titi's are viviparous animals, and produce a single offspring after a 5-month pregnancy period. All titis are monogamous - mating for life. They will only mate with one individual their entire life and solely produce offspring with one another. The brown titis will live in family groups, similar to all titi species, the group consisting of parent and offspring.

== Threats ==
The main threat in the Brazilian state of Rondônia is human development. Construction of housing, roads, architecture or even agriculture all contribute to habitat loss for the brown titis. Other detrimental threats include transportation such as roads and utility/service lines where they may possibly be killed when traversing across, dams and water management use, agriculture and biological resource use - hunting and trapping. It is not typically hunted in Brazil. Although rare, when hunted, they are harvested as food for local populations.

== Conservation ==
=== Status ===
As of its last assessment in 2020, the brown titi was rated as vulnerable by the IUCN Red List. Current population trends for the species were reported as unknown. They are still currently listed as vulnerable with a decreasing population trend, however, their population is not severely fragmented. It is estimated that only about 250 mature individuals remain.

=== Actions ===
Current conservation efforts to protect this vulnerable species includes education and habitat protection. Education efforts have the species included in international legislation and they are subject to trade controls and international management. For their habitat protection, there are active conservation sites and there are individuals within protected areas.
