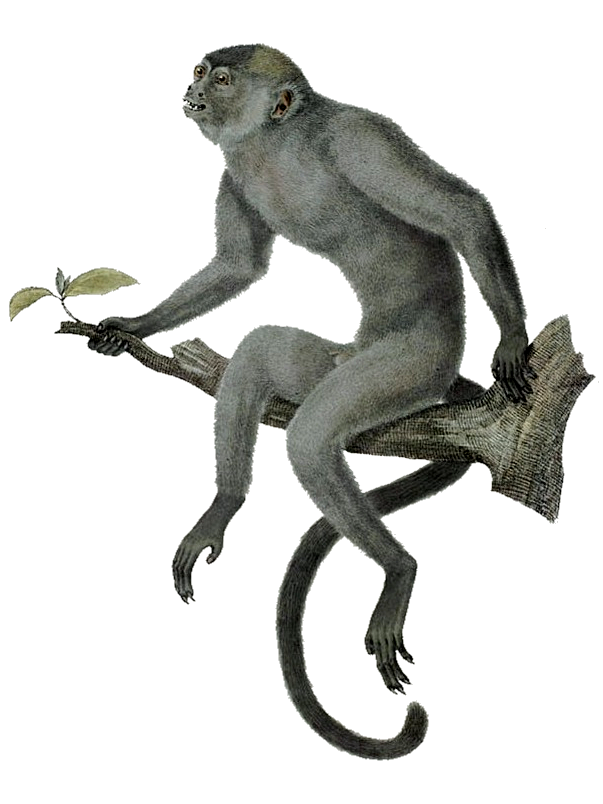

Conservation status
- Least Concern (IUCN 3.1)

Scientific classification
- Kingdom: Animalia
- Phylum: Chordata
- Class: Mammalia
- Infraclass: Placentalia
- Order: Primates
- Family: Pitheciidae
- Genus: Plecturocebus
- Species: P. cinerascens

Binomial name
- Plecturocebus cinerascens (Spix, 1823)
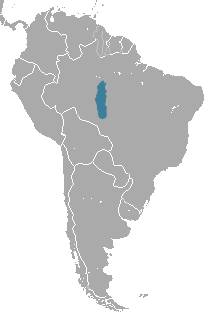
- Ashy Black Titi range

= Ashy black titi monkey =

Ashy black titi

Species of New World monkey

The ashy black titi monkey (Plecturocebus cinerascens) is a species of titi monkey, a type of New World monkey, endemic to Brazil. It was originally described as Callicebus cinerascens in 1823 and was changed to genus Plecturocebus in 2016.

== Taxonomy ==
The ashy black titi is a New World monkey in the family Pitheciidae. It was previously classified within the genus Callicebus, which historically included all titi monkeys. However, molecular phylogenetic studies have led to taxonomic revisions that split the group into multiple genera, including Plecturocebus, Callicebus, and Cheracebus. Furthermore, within the genus Plecturocebus, there are two species-groups, moloch and donacophilus; the ashy black titi is classified under the moloch group. This reclassification reflects evolutionary relationships based on genetic data rather than just focusing on morphology.

== Description ==
Within the moloch species-groups of Plecturocebus, species generally have a grayish or brownish dorsum with a white, orange, or red belly. However, P. cinerascens has a grey agouti coloration for all parts of the body except for a reddish brown agouti with grey agouti coloration on the dorsum. The is a north to south clinical bleaching gradient along the Aripunanã, Sucundurí, and Juruena interfluves. Males have a head-body length of 33–40 cm (13–16 in) and a tail length of 49–48 cm (19–19 in). Females are slightly smaller on average, and have a head-body length of 32–38 cm (13–15 in) and a tail length of 39–48 cm (15–19 in). The weight range is 740–950 g (26–34 oz).

== Distribution ==
P. cinerascens is endemic to Brazil, where its range is still poorly defined. In 1823, Spix indicated the presence of the titi monkey along the Peru-Brazil border, however no recent data has been able to support this original observation. Instead, current studies have found that P. cinerascens reside along the interfluves of Aripuanā, Sucundurí, and Juruena.

== Conservation status ==
Currently, the ashy black titi is classified as Least Concern (LC) on the IUCN Red List. The population trend is listed as unknown, as exact populations numbers can be difficult to estimate due to complex habitat conditions and limited field studies. Therefore, despite being listed as LC, this species may still face localized threats from deforestation to habitat fragmentation in the Amazon.
