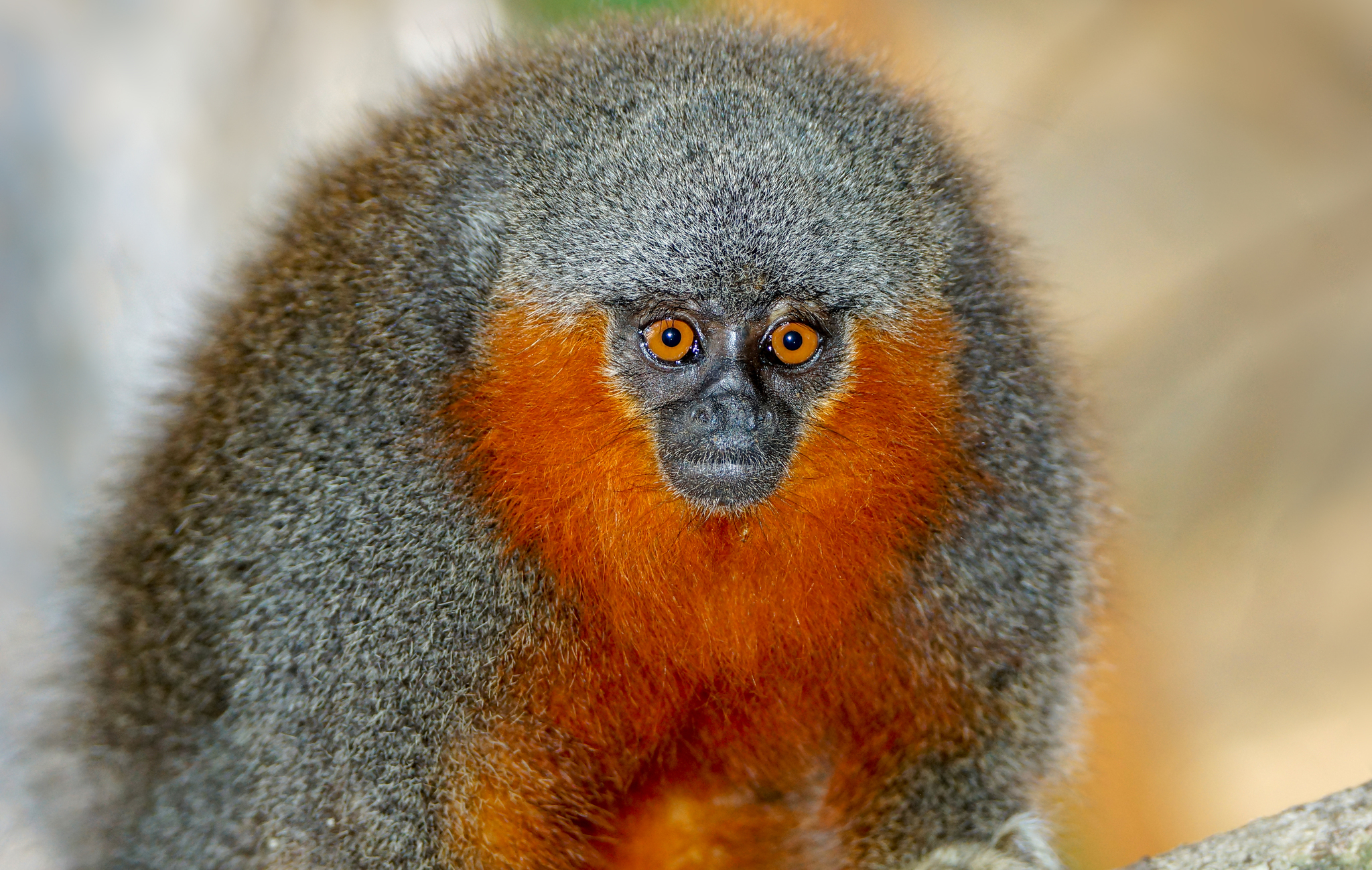

Conservation status
- Least Concern (IUCN 3.1)

Scientific classification
- Kingdom: Animalia
- Phylum: Chordata
- Class: Mammalia
- Infraclass: Placentalia
- Order: Primates
- Family: Pitheciidae
- Genus: Plecturocebus
- Species: P. moloch

Binomial name
- Plecturocebus moloch (Hoffmannsegg, 1807)
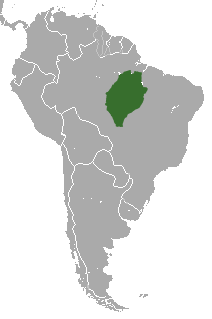
- Red-bellied titi range

Synonyms
- Callicebus moloch Hoffmannsegg, 1807

= Red-bellied titi monkey =

Red-bellied titi

Species of New World monkey

The red-bellied titi monkey or dusky titi (Plecturocebus moloch) is a species of titi monkey, a type of New World monkey, endemic to Brazil. It lives in forests and thickets.

It has a rounded head and a thick, soft coat and frequently adopts a characteristic posture with the body hunched, limbs close together, and a tail hanging down. The body is 28–39 cm (11–15 in) long, and the tail is 33–49 cm (13–19 in).

It can move quite fast if necessary but rarely does so and generally stays within a fairly small area, feeding on fruit, insects, spiders, small birds, and bird's eggs. It is diurnal and moves in pairs or family groups, which communicate by means of a wide repertoire of sounds. The female gives birth to a single offspring.

== Physical description ==
The red-bellied titi has an average head and body length of 333 mm (13.1 in) for males and 331 mm (13.0 in) for females, showing no sexual dimorphism. Its tail has a greater length than the head and body combined. Males weigh between 850–1,200 g (1.87–2.65 lb) while females range from 700–1,020 g (1.54–2.25 lb).

It has a larger pollex than its hallux. It has six palmar pads and nails on each of its five digits. It has a dental formula of i 2/2, p 3/3, m 3/3 with a total of 36. Its upper incisors are elongated and the incisiform canines barely extend beyond the other teeth. The upper molars are sometimes tricuspid and the lower premolars are relatively simple. Upper and lower molars are quadricuspid. It has relatively large ears often obscured by the fur on side of the head. The nose has a wide internal septum and the nares open laterally. In adults, the pelage of the back can be grey, reddish, or brown. It usually has white or black bands on its forehead. This color pattern found both in young and adults.

The ear has a helical margin that is pulled upward and towards the back. The anterior superior margins are rolled. Tragus and antitragus are small, lobulated and equal in size. The manus has a unique raided pads; the interdigital pads are separated from the palm by a structure called deep flex urge line. The palm consist of two elongated central pads, a hypothenar pad and a thenar pad.

The skull is orthognathous, orbits are unfenestrated, balls are inflated ventrally, and a large sinus found above the nasal. The foramen magnum is located towards the front, and the atlas has shallow anterior articular facets which allow the condyles to attach. Anterior margin of the lacrimal fossa is formed by or near the maxilla. The premaxilla is short, giving the appearance of a small, not especially prognathic face relative to other platyrrhines. The corpus of the mandible deepens posteriorly and the ramus is tall. The hyoid bone is expanded and highly convex ventrally.

== Behavior and ecology ==
Groups vary in size from two to four individuals usually with an adult female and an adult male. The young tend to leave group at the age of 2–3 years old. It rarely interacts with other primates. Bonding between male and female pairs is extremely strong. Once this relationship is established, partners remain very close to each other. Couples also intertwine the tails whenever possible. Couples tend to follow each other and remain near each other throughout the day. The males play a major role in taking care of the young. Siblings however, do not play a role and do not usually help in rearing of the young. The adults use chest rubbing as a visual signal, dragging branches along their chest slowly. Later, after brushing, the area is smelt or rubbed.

It tends to inhabit lower and denser tropical forest especially close to rivers and river banks. It has a frugivorous diet, eating anything from fruits and twigs to leaves and insects. It has a relatively small home range. Like other titis, it is highly territorial and sends out vocal calls to mark territory and scare off other animals.

Grooming occurs frequently throughout the day, mostly during rest periods. Both females and males, adults and young participate in grooming. It has been suggested that grooming is a form of habituation introducing the concept of presence and physical contact with companions. Adults and juvenile also intertwine tails with the opposite sex whenever two from the same social group are by each other.

The red-bellied titi has a variety of postures and facial expressions that it uses as visual signals. Swaying the entire body, turning the head sideways and lowering the head to face downward are examples of these signals. Observers have seen that these signals are a response to a disturbance or escape tendencies. Arching of the back is a signal that the red-bellied titi uses to warn that they're about to attack. This signal is associated with hostility, after they arch their backs an attack usually follows. Other signals associated with hostility include piloerection and tail lashing. These tend to follow back arching and are often used as scare tactics. Facial expressions observed in these species include partial and complete shutting of the eyes, protrusion of the lips and baring of the teeth which is usually followed by smacking of the lips.

Infants are usually transferred and tended to by the males. Females only lick and nurse the infants. The adult males are responsible for carrying the infants except when the young is being nursed or licked. Sometimes the juvenile transfers itself from adult to adult, especially when the two adults are close to each other. There is a close association between males and juvenile after the juvenile becomes self-locomoting.
