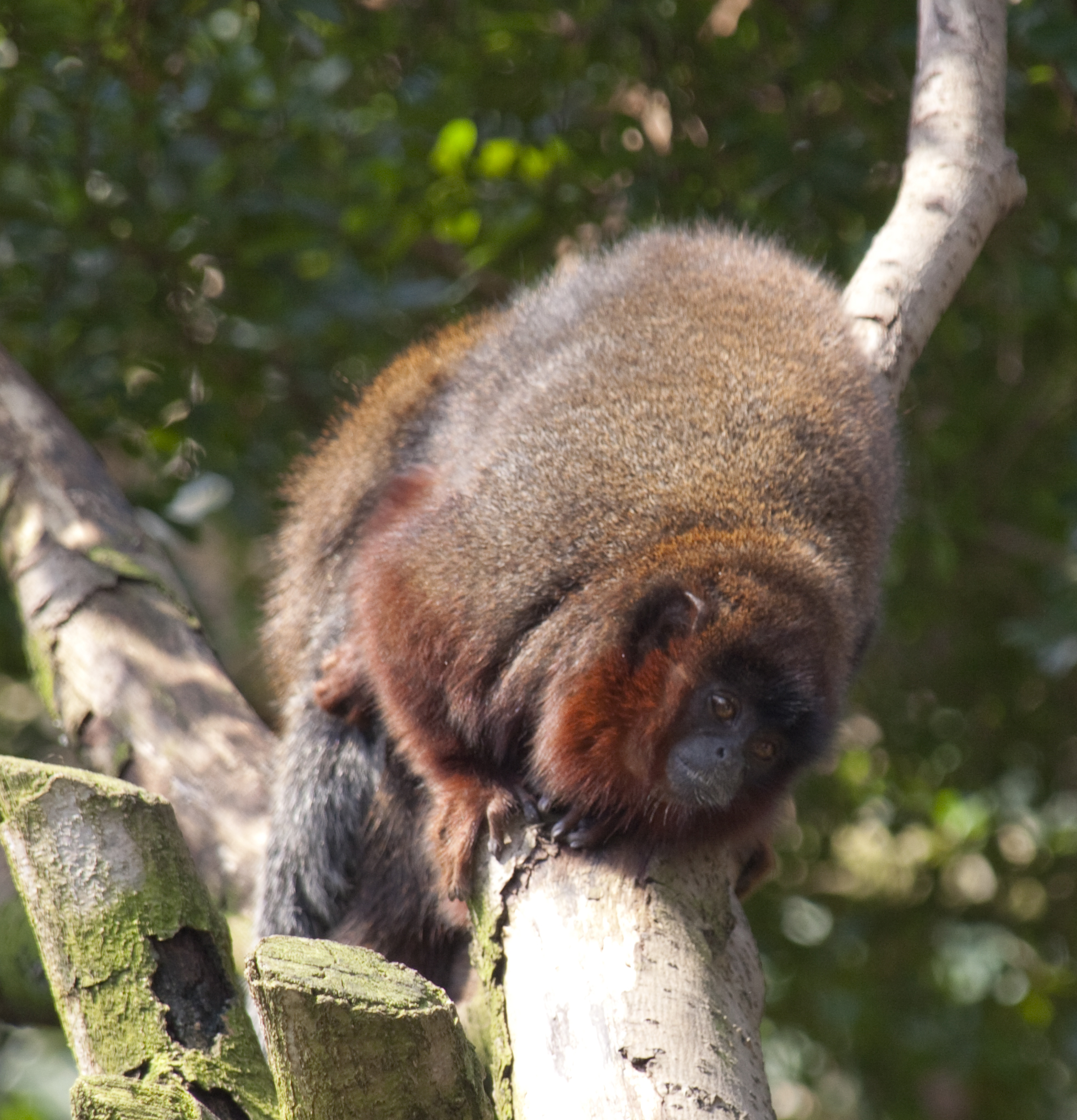
- Coppery titi

Conservation status
- Least Concern (IUCN 3.1)

Scientific classification
- Kingdom: Animalia
- Phylum: Chordata
- Class: Mammalia
- Infraclass: Placentalia
- Order: Primates
- Family: Pitheciidae
- Genus: Plecturocebus
- Species: P. cupreus

Binomial name
- Plecturocebus cupreus (Spix, 1823)
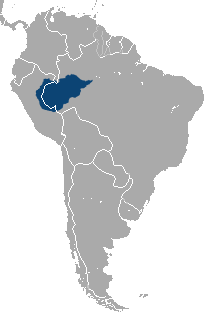
- Coppery titi range

Synonyms
- acreanus Vieira, 1952; egeria Thomas, 1908; toppinii Thomas, 1914

= Coppery titi monkey =

Coppery titi

Species of New World monkey

The coppery titi monkey (Plecturocebus cupreus) or red titi monkey is a species of titi monkey, a type of New World monkey, from South America. They are found in the Amazon of Brazil and Peru, and perhaps northern Bolivia. It was described as Callithrix cupreus in 1823. These monkeys have a lifespan of a little over 20 years. These monkeys eat certain fruits, insects, and plants. They live in monogamous pairs with interesting ways for vocalizing and protecting themselves from predators.

== Location, habitat and activity ==
Coppery titis typically inhabit lowland tropical and sub-tropical forests in areas that flood seasonally. They can also be found in forest understory habitats, young forests, swamp edges, and bamboo thickets. Their populations are mainly found west of the Rio Madeira in Brazil, around the Rio Huallaga in Peru, within the upper Rio Madre de Dios basin in Peru and Bolivia, near the northern Rio-Maranon-Amazonas area, around the Eastern Cordillera in Peru and Ecuador, between the Rios Guamues and the Putumayo, and along the eastern base of the Sierra de la Macarena between the Guyabero and Upia rivers.

== Diet ==
The diet of coppery titis is composed of fruit and insects. They spend nearly 75% of their time feeding eating fruit. The other 25% is spent eating bamboo, leaves, and some insects. The three most consumed fruits are Ficus, Brosimum rubecens, and various berries. Eating time is generally during the early morning and afternoon, while addition feeding on leaves happens before sleeping. Coppery titis rarely eat with other primates, but will eat before or after another primate in the same tree. Family groups will often and habitually eat from the same food source together, meaning there could be a social aspect to meal times. Females will vary their diet when lactating, eating nearly twice as many insects. This is due to the body's higher demand for protein. Males are not known to vary their diets during the time they spend as the primary care-giver.

== Behavior ==
The behavior of the coppery titis is characterized by a diurnal and entirely arboreal nature, spending all of their day in trees. They live in family groups which consist of an adult pair and up to three generations of off-spring. The adult pairs are monogamous and mate for life. Family members may engage in tail-intertwining before and during sleep. As their tails are not prehensile they cannot be used as an additional grip. When first meeting, these monkeys will smell each other's faces. The titis will also smell their own scent by rubbing their chests on branches, spreading secretions from their sternal gland before sniffing them. It is possible that this plays a role when marking territory. They have several visual cues which they display when angry or excited. Most notably shaking of their heads and bodies, swaying, looking away from others, or raising and lashing out with their tail. Other cues include barred teeth, a lowered head, closed eyes, protruding lips or an arched back. There have been observations of the coppery titi monkeys using the Psychotria leaf to self-medicate through fur rubbing. This ritual is rare and does not happen often. They do this by chewing on the plant and rubbing it on their abdomen for about five minutes. This behavior can be interpreted as self-medication since the plant is known for being used as a medical herb in traditional medicine, as well as having anti-viral and anti-bacterial properties. Females will show similar behaviors of their bonded pair to same-sex intruders to show a strong relationship. If successful, the intruder will go away, resulting in reproductive success for the monogamous bonded pair. Once there has been an offspring introduced to a couple, the activity budget of these monkeys will change. During this period, the mother will feed more and rest less, and the male will feed less and rest more. This is because the females will forage more to feed the baby, and the male would hold the baby more to protect them.

=== Anti-predation behavior ===
Another observation that has been conducted is anti-predatory behavior. These monkeys have been seen to have a "mobbing behavior" towards possible predators. The mobbing behavior starts with one male starting an alarm call, this will trigger others to join and within two to three minutes there is a group alarm call that is surrounding the predator. Males are usually the ones who sing this alarm call. The monkeys move around the predator sporadically, continuing this alarm call, lashing their tails, and swaying their heads. During this phenomenon they also get goose bumps. The reasoning behind it is believed to reduce attacks and increase the chances of the predator leaving. This "mobbing behavior" usually happens without infants involved. When there is an infant involved another coppery titi monkey will hide the infant farther away from the area, meanwhile still singing the alarm call. Out of all observations of this behaviour, the longest alarm call went over 40 minutes.

== Vocalization and communication ==
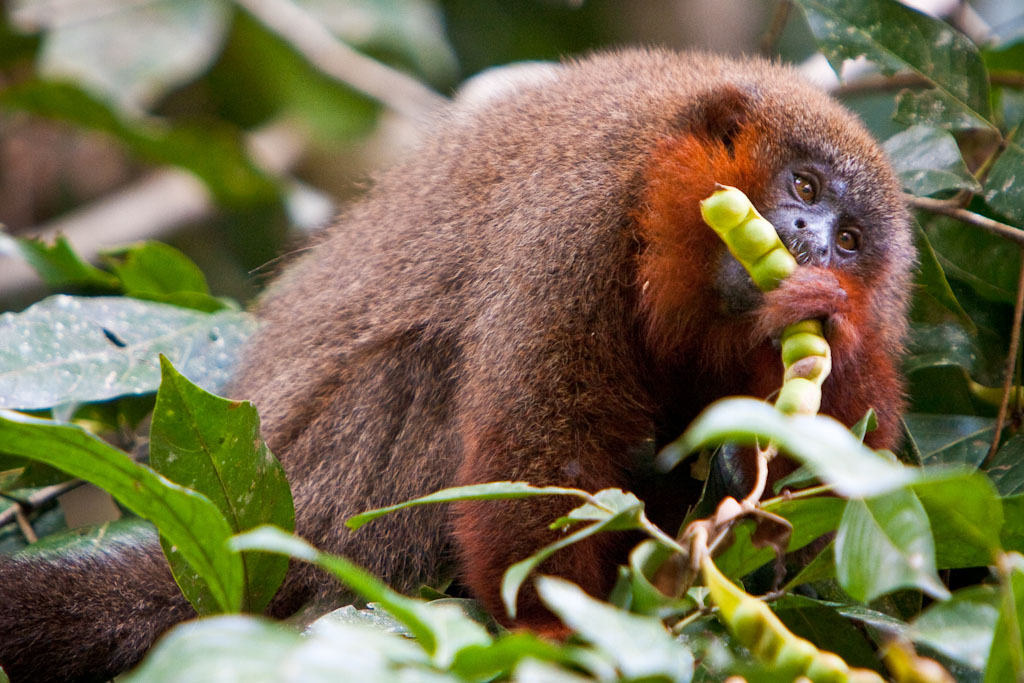
Coppery titi monkey eating.

Coppery titis are highly vocal animals with a complex set of vocalizations and sounds. Coppery titis will vocalize with grunts, screams, whistles and moans. Their most frequent vocalizations are bellows, pumping, and panting, which are the main components of male-female pair duets. These duets are daily performances which occur during or before sunrise near the edge of their territories. Neighboring pairs respond to each other's duets, establishing territorial boundaries. Duets can last up to five minutes, beginning with moaning and ending with honking. For the duration of the duet, males and females will alternate between bellowing calls and panting responses. Between these sequences, the titis will synchronize in a pumping transition. The amount of time spent between synchronized transitions changes over time. Newly paired couples will spend more time between transitions, while older pairs typically show less variability in the length of each sequence between transitions. It seems that weather also has an effect on duetting; they will spend more time duetting on overcast days rather than clear ones. However, they do not perform duets while it rains. Their vocalizations can be heard up to one kilometer, and come in different frequencies and pitches, making it so that if studied, or with careful listening, you can identify them individually. Adult vocalizations are identifiable through an 83% accuracy and infants with a 48% accuracy with a leave-one-out cross validation method of quantitative research. Stating that it is easier to identify adult coppery titi monkeys than it is to identify infants. This is beneficial for territorial boundaries and for identifying their other pair when vocalizing from farther distances in instances where they cannot use other senses to identify the other pair. Smelling is a form of communication for the Coppery Titi Monkeys. To identify another monkey from up close, they will smell each other's faces. A way to advance before getting involved in sexual intercourse, a male will smell the female's genitals.

== Ecological role, predation, and conservation ==
The ecological role of the coppery titi is an important one for the sake of local biodiversity. Coppery titis scatter the seeds of fruits within their habitats, promoting continued growth. Coppery titis are hunted by birds of prey and feral cats. There have been observations of possible predators that have not been officially confirmed which include ocelots, boa constrictors, tayras, hawk, gray-headed kites, squirrel monkey, and capuchin monkey. Threats from human predation are low, as they do not compose the diets of local hunters, unlike larger neotropical primates. Despite this, they are occasionally hunted as bushmeat and for their tails. Due to their location in a remote, isolated region however, the International Union for Conservation of Nature's Red List of Threatened Species (IUCN) puts the coppery titi in the Least Concern (LC) category of endangerment.
