= List of platyrrhines =

Species in mammal parvorder Platyrrhini

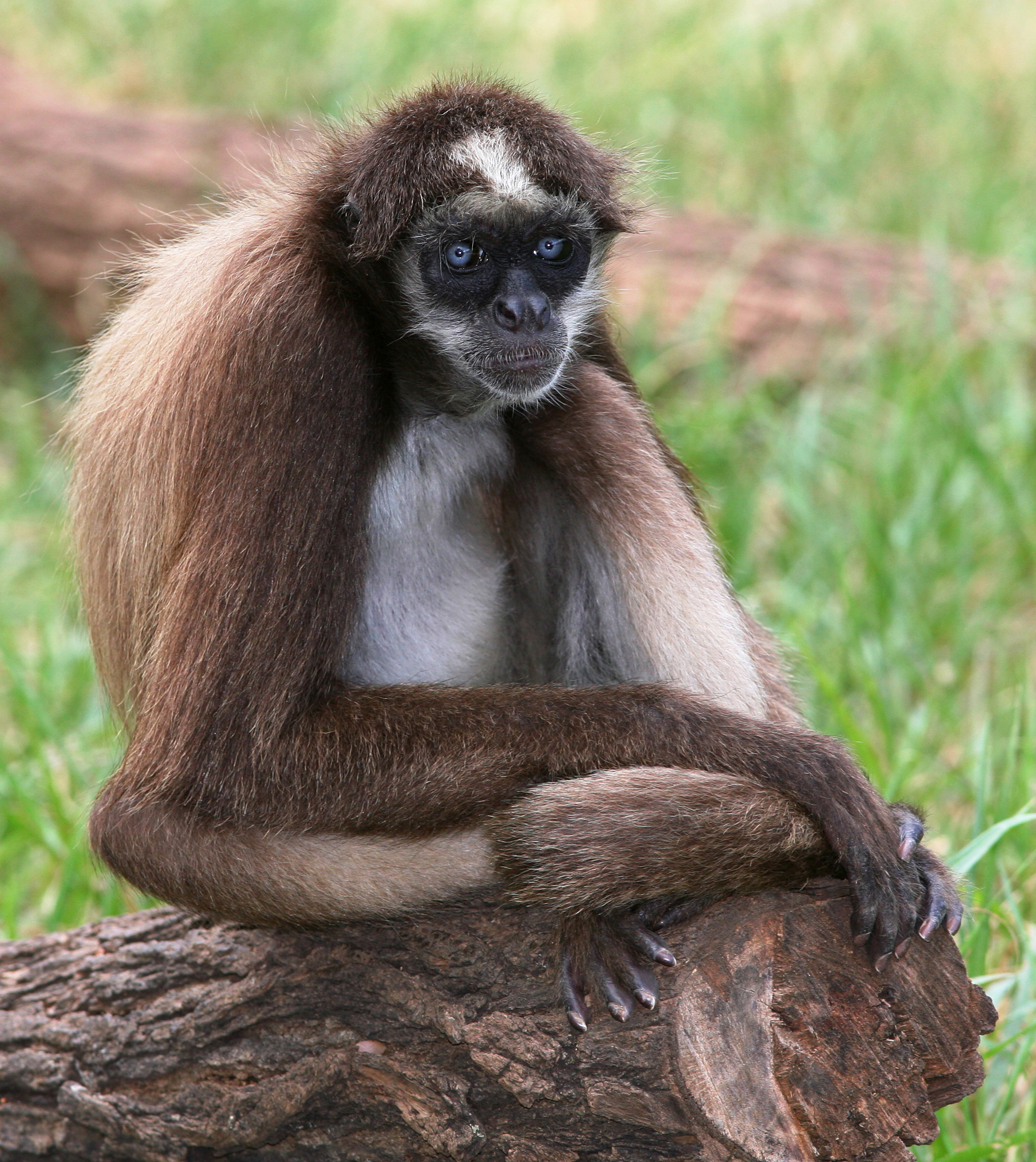
Brown spider monkey (Ateles hybridus)

Platyrrhini is a parvorder of primates. Members of this parvorder are called platyrrhines, or New World monkeys, and include marmosets, tamarins, and capuchin, squirrel, night, titi, saki, howler, spider, and woolly monkeys. Platyrrhini is one of three clades that form the suborder Haplorrhini, itself one of two suborders in the order Primates. They are found in forests and savannas from South America to Mexico. They range in size from the western pygmy marmoset, at 12 cm (5 in) plus a 17 cm (7 in) tail, to some species of howler monkey in the genus Alouatta, at 92 cm (36 in) plus a 92 cm (36 in) tail. Platyrrhines primarily eat fruit, leaves, and insects. Most platyrrhines lack population estimates, but those that do range from 250 mature individuals to 10,000. Twenty-one species are categorized as endangered, and a further fourteen species are categorized as critically endangered.

The 163 extant species of Platyrrhini are divided into five families. Aotidae contains eleven night monkey species in a single genus. Atelidae contains twenty-three species divided between one genus in the howler monkey subfamily Alouattinae and three genera in the spider monkey and woolly monkey subfamily Atelinae. Callitrichidae contains 53 species of tamarins and marmosets in seven genera. Cebidae contains eighteen species divided between two genera in the capuchin subfamily Cebinae and one genus in the squirrel monkey subfamily Saimiriinae. Pitheciidae contains 57 species divided between three genera in the titi monkey subfamily Callicebinae and three genera in the uakari and saki monkey subfamily Pitheciinae. Dozens of extinct prehistoric platyrrhine species have been discovered, though ongoing research means the exact number and categorization remain uncertain.

== Conventions ==
IUCN Red List categories
Conservation status
- EX: Extinct (0 species)
- EW: Extinct in the wild (0 species)
- CR: Critically endangered (14 species)
- EN: Endangered (21 species)
- VU: Vulnerable (32 species)
- NT: Near threatened (15 species)
- LC: Least concern (74 species)

Other categories
- DD: Data deficient (7 species)
- NE: Not evaluated (0 species)

The author citation for the species or genus is given after the scientific name; parentheses around the author citation indicate that this was not the original taxonomic placement. Conservation status codes listed follow the International Union for Conservation of Nature (IUCN) Red List of Threatened Species. Range maps are provided wherever possible; if a range map is not available, a description of the platyrrhine's range is provided. Ranges are based on the IUCN Red List for that species unless otherwise noted.

== Classification ==
The parvorder Platyrrhini consists of five extant families: Aotidae, Atelidae, Callitrichidae, Cebidae, and Pitheciidae. Aotidae contains 11 species in a single genus. Atelidae is divided into two subfamilies: Alouattinae, containing twelve species in one genus, and Atelinae, containing eleven species in three genera. Callitrichidae contains 53 species in seven genera. Cebidae is divided into two subfamilies: Cebinae, containing eleven species in two genera, and Saimiriinae, containing one genus of seven species. Pitheciidae is divided into two subfamilies: Callicebinae, containing 32 species in three genera, and Pitheciinae, containing 25 species in three genera.

Family Aotidae

- Genus Aotus (night monkeys): eleven species

Family Atelidae

- Subfamily Alouattinae
  - Genus Alouatta (howler monkeys): twelve species
- Subfamily Atelinae
  - Genus Ateles (spider monkeys): seven species
  - Genus Brachyteles (muriquis): two species
  - Genus Lagothrix (wooly monkeys): two species

Family Callitrichidae

- Genus Callimico (Goeldi's marmoset): one species
- Genus Callithrix (Atlantic Forest marmosets): six species
- Genus Cebuella (pygmy marmosets): two species
- Genus Leontocebus (saddle-back tamarins): seven species
- Genus Leontopithecus (lion tamarins): four species
- Genus Mico (marmosets): sixteen species
- Genus Saguinus (tamarins): seventeen species

Family Cebidae

- Subfamily Cebinae
  - Genus Cebus (gracile capuchin monkeys): four species
  - Genus Sapajus (robust capuchin monkeys): seven species
- Subfamily Saimiriinae
  - Genus Saimiri (squirrel monkeys): seven species

Family Pitheciidae

- Subfamily Callicebinae
  - Genus Callicebus (Atlantic Forest titi monkeys): five species
  - Genus Cheracebus (widow titi monkeys): five species
  - Genus Plecturocebus (Amazonian and Chaco titi monkeys): twenty-two species
- Subfamily Pitheciinae
  - Genus Cacajao (uakaris): seven species
  - Genus Chiropotes (bearded saki monkeys): five species
  - Genus Pithecia (saki monkeys): thirteen species

- Platyrrhini
  - - Pitheciidae
      - Callicebinae
        - - Plecturocebus
          - Callicebus
        - Cheracebus
      - Pitheciinae
        - - Cacajao
          - Chiropotes
        - Pithecia
  - - - Atelidae
        - Alouattinae
          Alouatta
        - Atelinae
          - Ateles
          - - Brachyteles
            - Lagothrix
    - - - Cebidae
          - Cebinae
            - Cebus
            - Sapajus
          - Saimirinae
            Saimiri
      - - Callitrichidae
          - - - - - Cebuella
                  - Mico
                - Callithrix
              - Callimico
            - Leontopithecus
          - - Leontocebus
            - Saguinus
        - Aotidae
          Aotus

== Platyrrhines ==
The following classification is based on the taxonomy described by the reference work Mammal Species of the World (2005), with augmentation by generally accepted proposals made since using molecular phylogenetic analysis, as supported by both the IUCN and the American Society of Mammalogists.

=== Family Aotidae ===
Genus Aotus – Illiger, 1811 – eleven species
Common name	Scientific name and subspecies	Range	Size and ecology	IUCN status and estimated population
Azara's night monkey	A. azarae (Humboldt, 1811) Three subspecies: A. a. azarae; A. a. boliviensis (Bolivian night monkey); A. a. infulatus (Feline night monkey)	Central and northeastern South America	Size: 24–37 cm (9–15 in) long, plus 31–40 cm (12–16 in) tail Habitat: Forest and savanna Diet: Fruit, as well as nectar, flowers, insects, and other small animals	LC Unknown
Black-headed night monkey	A. nigriceps (Dollman, 1909)	Central South America	Size: 24–37 cm (9–15 in) long, plus 30–39 cm (12–15 in) tail Habitat: Forest Diet: Fruit, insects, fruits, leaves, and flowers	LC Unknown
Brumback's night monkey	A. brumbacki Hershkovitz, 1983	Northwestern South America	Size: 24–37 cm (9–15 in) long, plus 31–40 cm (12–16 in) tail Habitat: Forest and savanna Diet: Fruit, as well as nectar, flowers, insects, and other small animals	VU Unknown
Gray-bellied night monkey	A. lemurinus I. Geoffroy, 1846	Northwestern South America	Size: 30–32 cm (12–13 in) long, plus 34–35 cm (13–14 in) tail Habitat: Forest Diet: Fruit, nectar, leaves, and insects, as well as small birds and mammals	VU Unknown
Gray-handed night monkey	A. griseimembra Elliot, 1912	Northwestern South America	Size: 24–37 cm (9–15 in) long, plus 31–40 cm (12–16 in) tail Habitat: Forest Diet: Fruit, as well as nectar, flowers, insects, and other small animals	VU Unknown
Hernández-Camacho's night monkey	A. jorgehernandezi Defler & Bueno, 2007	Western Colombia	Size: 24–37 cm (9–15 in) long, plus 31–40 cm (12–16 in) tail Habitat: Forest Diet: Fruit, as well as nectar, flowers, insects, and other small animals	DD Unknown
Nancy Ma's night monkey	A. nancymaae Hershkovitz, 1983	Northwestern South America	Size: About 32 cm (13 in) long, plus about 32 cm (13 in) tail Habitat: Forest Diet: Fruit, nectar, and insects	VU Unknown
Panamanian night monkey	A. zonalis Goldman, 1914	Northwestern South America and Central America	Size: 30–33 cm (12–13 in) long, plus about 30 cm (12 in) tail Habitat: Forest Diet: Fruit, nectar, flowers, insects, and other small animals	NT Unknown
Peruvian night monkey	A. miconax Thomas, 1927	Northwestern South America	Size: 24–37 cm (9–15 in) long, plus 31–40 cm (12–16 in) tail Habitat: Forest Diet: Fruit, flowers, leaves, buds, and insects	EN Unknown
Spix's night monkey	A. vociferans (Spix, 1823)	Northwestern South America	Size: 24–37 cm (9–15 in) long, plus 32–40 cm (13–16 in) tail Habitat: Forest Diet: Fruit, nectar, flowers, insects, and other small animals	LC Unknown
Three-striped night monkey	A. trivirgatus (Humboldt, 1811)	Northern South America	Size: 24–47 cm (9–19 in) long, plus 22–42 cm (9–17 in) tail Habitat: Forest Diet: Fruit, insects, nectar and leaves, as well as lizards, frogs and eggs	LC Unknown

=== Family Atelidae ===
==== Subfamily Alouattinae ====
Genus Alouatta – Lacépède, 1799 – twelve species
Common name	Scientific name and subspecies	Range	Size and ecology	IUCN status and estimated population
Amazon black howler	A. nigerrima Lönnberg, 1941	Central South America	Size: 56–91 cm (22–36 in) long, plus 56–91 cm (22–36 in) tail Habitat: Forest and savanna Diet: Leaves, fruit, buds, flowers, seeds, moss, stems, and termite nests	LC Unknown
Black howler	A. caraya (Humboldt, 1812)	Central South America	Size: 51–67 cm (20–26 in) long, plus 51–67 cm (20–26 in) tail Habitat: Forest and savanna Diet: Leaves, as well as fruit, buds and flowers	NT Unknown
Bolivian red howler	A. sara Elliot, 1910	Central South America	Size: 54–71 cm (21–28 in) long, plus 52–60 cm (20–24 in) tail Habitat: Forest and savanna Diet: Leaves, fruit, buds, flowers, seeds, moss, stems, and termite nests	NT Unknown
Brown howler	A. guariba (Humboldt, 1812) Two subspecies: A. g. clamitans (Southern brown howler); A. g. guariba (Northern brown howler)	East South America	Size: 55–92 cm (22–36 in) long, plus 58–92 cm (23–36 in) tail Habitat: Forest Diet: Leaves, flowers, and fruit	VU Unknown
Colombian red howler	A. seniculus (Linnaeus, 1766) Two subspecies: A. s. juara (Juruá red howler); A. s. seniculus (Colombian red howler)	Northwestern South America	Size: 48–63 cm (19–25 in) long, plus 52–80 cm (20–31 in) tail Habitat: Forest and savanna Diet: Leaves, fruit, buds, flowers, seeds, moss, stems, and termite nests	LC Unknown
Guyanan red howler	A. macconnelli Linnaeus, 1766	Northern South America	Size: 55–92 cm (22–36 in) long, plus 58–92 cm (23–36 in) tail Habitat: Forest and savanna Diet: Leaves, fruit, buds, flowers, seeds, moss, stems, and termite nests	LC Unknown
Mantled howler	A. palliata (Gray, 1849) Five subspecies: A. p. aequatorialis (Ecuadorian mantled howler); A. p. coibensis (Coiba Island howler); A. p. mexicana (Mexican howler); A. p. palliata (Golden-mantled howler); A. p. trabeata (Azuero howler)	Northwestern South America, Central America, and southern Mexico	Size: 38–58 cm (15–23 in) long, plus 52–67 cm (20–26 in) tail Habitat: Forest Diet: Leaves, fruit, and flowers	VU Unknown
Maranhão red-handed howler	A. ululata Elliot, 1912	Northeastern Brazil	Size: 55–92 cm (22–36 in) long, plus 58–92 cm (23–36 in) tail Habitat: Forest and savanna Diet: Fruit and leaves	EN 250–2,500
Red-handed howler	A. belzebul (Linnaeus, 1766)	Northeastern and eastern Brazil	Size: 40–65 cm (16–26 in) long, plus 58–10 cm (23–4 in) tail Habitat: Forest Diet: Leaves, bark, and twigs, as well as flowers	VU Unknown
Spix's red-handed howler	A. discolor (Spix, 1823)	Central Brazil	Size: 55–92 cm (22–36 in) long, plus 58–92 cm (23–36 in) tail Habitat: Forest Diet: Fruit and leaves, as well as flowers, bark, decaying wood, termite nests, and twigs	VU Unknown
Ursine howler	A. arctoidea A. Cabrera, 1940	Northern South America	Size: 55–92 cm (22–36 in) long, plus 58–92 cm (23–36 in) tail Habitat: Forest and savanna Diet: Leaves and fruit, as well as buds, flowers, seeds, moss, stems, and termite nests	LC Unknown
Yucatán black howler	A. pigra Lawrence, 1933	Yucatán Peninsula in Mexico and Central America	Size: 52–71 cm (20–28 in) long, plus 50–69 cm (20–27 in) tail Habitat: Forest Diet: Fruit, leaves, buds, and flowers	EN Unknown

==== Subfamily Atelinae ====
Genus Ateles – Geoffroy, 1806 – seven species
Common name	Scientific name and subspecies	Range	Size and ecology	IUCN status and estimated population
Black-headed spider monkey	A. fusciceps Gray, 1866 Two subspecies: A. f. fusciceps (Brown-headed spider monkey); A. f. rufiventris (Colombian spider monkey)	Northwestern South America (in red)	Size: 40–55 cm (16–22 in) long, plus 70–85 cm (28–33 in) tail Habitat: Forest Diet: Fruit, leaves, nuts, seeds, and insects, as well as eggs	EN Unknown
Brown spider monkey	A. hybridus I. Geoffroy, 1829	Northwestern South America	Size: 45–50 cm (18–20 in) long, plus 74–81 cm (29–32 in) tail Habitat: Forest Diet: Fruit, as well as leaves, flowers, seeds, bark, honey, decaying wood, termites, and caterpillars	CR Unknown
Geoffroy's spider monkey	A. geoffroyi Kuhl, 1820 Six subspecies: A. g. azuerensis (Azuero spider monkey); A. g. frontatus (Black-foreheaded spider monkey); A. g. geoffroyi (Nicaraguan spider monkey); A. g. grisescens (Hooded spider monkey); A. g. ornatus (Ornate spider monkey); A. g. vellerosus (Mexican spider monkey)	Central America and southern Mexico (in blue)	Size: 30–63 cm (12–25 in) long, plus 63–84 cm (25–33 in) tail Habitat: Forest Diet: Fruit, leaves, and flowers, as well as nuts, seeds, insects, arachnids, and eggs	EN Unknown
Peruvian spider monkey	A. chamek (Humboldt, 1812)	Central South America	Size: 40–60 cm (16–24 in) long, plus 70–88 cm (28–35 in) tail Habitat: Forest Diet: Fruit, as well as flowers, insects, and leaves	EN Unknown
Red-faced spider monkey	A. paniscus (Linnaeus, 1758)	Northern South America	Size: 38–63 cm (15–25 in) long, plus 50–89 cm (20–35 in) tail Habitat: Forest Diet: Fruit, as well as leaves, flowers, seeds, roots, and fungi	VU Unknown
White-bellied spider monkey	A. belzebuth Geoffroy, 1806	Northwestern South America	Size: 34–59 cm (13–23 in) long, plus 61–88 cm (24–35 in) tail Habitat: Forest Diet: Fruit, as well as leaves, flowers, seeds, roots, decaying wood, honey, and insects	EN Unknown
White-cheeked spider monkey	A. marginatus Geoffroy, 1809	North-central South America	Size: 38–63 cm (15–25 in) long, plus 50–89 cm (20–35 in) tail Habitat: Forest Diet: Fruit, as well as leaves, flowers, seeds, roots, decaying wood, honey, and insects	EN Unknown

Genus Brachyteles – Geoffroy, 1806 – two species
Common name	Scientific name and subspecies	Range	Size and ecology	IUCN status and estimated population
Northern muriqui	B. hypoxanthus (Kuhl, 1820)	Southeastern Brazil	Size: 46–50 cm (18–20 in) long, plus 72–81 cm (28–32 in) tail Habitat: Forest Diet: Leaves, fruit, vines, flowers, bark, nectar, and seeds	CR 1,000
Southern muriqui	B. arachnoides (Geoffroy, 1806)	Southeastern Brazil	Size: 46–50 cm (18–20 in) long, plus 72–81 cm (28–32 in) tail Habitat: Forest Diet: Fruit, leaves, flowers, and seeds	CR Unknown

Genus Lagothrix – Geoffroy, 1812 – two species
Common name	Scientific name and subspecies	Range	Size and ecology	IUCN status and estimated population
Common woolly monkey	L. lagotricha (Humboldt, 1812) Five subspecies: L. l. cana (Gray woolly monkey); L. l. lagothricha (Brown woolly monkey); L. l. lugens (Colombian woolly monkey); L. l. poeppigii (Silvery woolly monkey); L. l. tschudii (Peruvian woolly monkey)	Northwestern South America	Size: 55–69 cm (22–27 in) long, plus 60–72 cm (24–28 in) tail Habitat: Forest, savanna Diet: Fruit, as well as leaves, seeds, and insects	VU Unknown
Yellow-tailed woolly monkey	L. flavicauda Humboldt, 1812	Western South America	Size: 44–53 cm (17–21 in) long, plus 60–65 cm (24–26 in) tail Habitat: Forest Diet: Fruit, leaves, insects, moss, buds, and flowers	CR 1,000–10,000

=== Family Callitrichidae ===
Genus Callimico – Miranda-Ribeiro, 1922 – one species
Common name	Scientific name and subspecies	Range	Size and ecology	IUCN status and estimated population
Goeldi's marmoset	C. goeldii Thomas, 1904	Western South America	Size: 21–23 cm (8–9 in) long, plus 25–33 cm (10–13 in) tail Habitat: Forest Diet: Fruit, insects, and fungi, as well as lizards, frogs, and other small vertebrates	VU Unknown

Genus Callithrix – Erxleben, 1777 – six species
Common name	Scientific name and subspecies	Range	Size and ecology	IUCN status and estimated population
Black-tufted marmoset	C. penicillata (Geoffroy, 1812)	Eastern South America	Size: 22–28 cm (9–11 in) long, plus 44–56 cm (17–22 in) tail Habitat: Forest and savanna Diet: Tree sap, as well as fruit, insects, arthropods, mollusks, and small vertebrates	LC Unknown
Buffy-headed marmoset	C. flaviceps (Thomas, 1903)	Eastern South America	Size: 18–30 cm (7–12 in) long, plus 17–41 cm (7–16 in) tail Habitat: Forest Diet: Plant gum, as well as fruit, seeds, nectar, and flowers	CR 2,000–2,500
Buffy-tufted marmoset	C. aurita (Geoffroy, 1812)	Eastern South America	Size: 18–30 cm (7–12 in) long, plus 17–41 cm (7–16 in) tail Habitat: Forest Diet: Ants, termites, larvae, caterpillars, and large-winged insects	EN 10,000–11,000
Common marmoset	C. jacchus (Linnaeus, 1758)	Eastern South America	Size: 12–15 cm (5–6 in) long, plus 29–35 cm (11–14 in) tail Habitat: Forest and savanna Diet: Tree sap, insects, spiders, fruit, flowers, and nectar, as well as small lizards, birds' eggs, nestlings, and frogs	LC Unknown
White-headed marmoset	C. geoffroyi (Humboldt, 1812)	Eastern South America	Size: 18–23 cm (7–9 in) long, plus about 29 cm (11 in) tail Habitat: Forest and savanna Diet: Fruit, insects, and plant gums, as well as flowers, nectar, frogs, snails, lizards, and spiders	LC Unknown
Wied's marmoset	C. kuhlii Coimbra-Filho, 1985	Eastern South America	Size: 20–22 cm (8–9 in) long, plus 27–31 cm (11–12 in) tail Habitat: Forest Diet: Sap, fruit, flowers, nectar, seeds, insects, and spiders	VU Unknown

Genus Cebuella – Gray, 1866 – two species
Common name	Scientific name and subspecies	Range	Size and ecology	IUCN status and estimated population
Eastern pygmy marmoset	C. niveiventris Lönnberg, 1940	Western South America	Size: 18–30 cm (7–12 in) long, plus 17–41 cm (7–16 in) tail Habitat: Forest Diet: Tree gum	VU Unknown
Western pygmy marmoset	C. pygmaea (Spix, 1823)	Western South America	Size: 12–15 cm (5–6 in) long, plus 17–23 cm (7–9 in) tail Habitat: Forest Diet: Tree gum, sap, and resin, as well as insects, small lizards, fruit, flowers, and spiders	VU Unknown

Genus Leontocebus – Wagner, 1840 – seven species
Common name	Scientific name and subspecies	Range	Size and ecology	IUCN status and estimated population
Andean saddle-back tamarin	L. leucogenys (Gray, 1866)	Western South America	Size: 17–31 cm (7–12 in) long, plus 25–44 cm (10–17 in) tail Habitat: Forest Diet: Fruit pulp, sap, nectar, invertebrates, and small vertebrates	LC Unknown
Cruz Lima's saddle-back tamarin	L. cruzlimai (Hershkovitz, 1966)	Central South America	Size: 17–31 cm (7–12 in) long, plus 25–44 cm (10–17 in) tail Habitat: Forest Diet: Fruit, sap, nectar, vegetation, spiders, small vertebrates, and eggs	LC Unknown
Geoffroy's saddle-back tamarin	L. nigrifrons (I. Geoffroy, 1850)	Western South America	Size: 17–31 cm (7–12 in) long, plus 25–44 cm (10–17 in) tail Habitat: Forest Diet: Fruit pulp, sap, nectar, invertebrates, and small vertebrates	LC Unknown
Illiger's saddle-back tamarin	L. illigeri (Pucheran, 1845)	Western South America	Size: 17–31 cm (7–12 in) long, plus 25–44 cm (10–17 in) tail Habitat: Forest Diet: Fruit pulps, sap, nectar, invertebrates, and small vertebrates	NT Unknown
Lesson's saddle-back tamarin	L. fuscus (Lesson, 1840)	Western South America	Size: 17–31 cm (7–12 in) long, plus 25–44 cm (10–17 in) tail Habitat: Forest Diet: Fruit, nectar, gum, and small animals	LC Unknown
Red-mantled saddle-back tamarin	L. lagonotus (Espada, 1870)	Western South America	Size: 17–31 cm (7–12 in) long, plus 25–44 cm (10–17 in) tail Habitat: Forest Diet: Fruit pulp, sap, nectar, invertebrates, and small vertebrates	LC Unknown
Weddell's saddle-back tamarin	L. weddelli (Deville, 1849) Three subspecies: L. w. crandalli (Crandall's saddle-back tamarin); L. w. melanoleucus (White-mantled tamarin); L. w. weddelli	Western South America	Size: About 19 cm (7 in) long, plus about 30 cm (12 in) tail Habitat: Forest Diet: Fruit pulp, sap, nectar, invertebrates, and small vertebrates	LC Unknown

Genus Leontopithecus – Lesson, 1840 – four species
Common name	Scientific name and subspecies	Range	Size and ecology	IUCN status and estimated population
Black lion tamarin	L. chrysopygus (Mikan, 1823)	Southeastern South America	Size: 20–34 cm (8–13 in) long, plus 31–40 cm (12–16 in) tail Habitat: Forest Diet: Insects and fruit, as well as lizards, birds, other small vertebrates, and bird eggs	EN 1,600
Golden lion tamarin	L. rosalia (Linnaeus, 1766)	Southeastern South America	Size: 20–37 cm (8–15 in) long, plus 31–40 cm (12–16 in) tail Habitat: Forest Diet: Spiders, snails, small lizards, eggs, small birds, fruit, and vegetables	EN 1,400
Golden-headed lion tamarin	L. chrysomelas (Kuhl, 1820)	Eastern South America	Size: 20–34 cm (8–13 in) long, plus 31–40 cm (12–16 in) tail Habitat: Forest Diet: Insects and fruit, as well as lizards, birds, other small vertebrates, and bird eggs	EN Unknown
Superagüi lion tamarin	L. caissara Lorini & Guerra, 1990	Southeastern South America	Size: About 30 cm (12 in) long, plus about 43 cm (17 in) tail Habitat: Forest Diet: Fruit, flowers, gum, and nectar, as well as insects, small lizards, and snakes	EN 250

Genus Mico – Lesson, 1840 – sixteen species
Common name	Scientific name and subspecies	Range	Size and ecology	IUCN status and estimated population
Black-headed marmoset	M. nigriceps Ferrari & Lopes, 1992	Central South America	Size: 18–30 cm (7–12 in) long, plus 17–41 cm (7–16 in) tail Habitat: Forest Diet: Fruit, flowers, nectar, gum, sap, frogs, snails, lizards, spiders, and insects	NT Unknown
Black-tailed marmoset	M. melanurus (Geoffroy, 1812)	Central South America	Size: 18–30 cm (7–12 in) long, plus 17–41 cm (7–16 in) tail Habitat: Savanna and shrubland Diet: Insects, spiders, small vertebrates, eggs, fruit, and sap	NT Unknown
Emilia's marmoset	M. emiliae (Thomas, 1920)	Central South America	Size: About 22 cm (9 in) long, plus about 34 cm (13 in) tail Habitat: Forest and savanna Diet: Fruit, flowers, nectar, gum, sap, frogs, snails, lizards, spiders, and insects	LC Unknown
Gold-and-white marmoset	M. chrysoleucos (Wagner, 1842)	Central South America	Size: 19–26 cm (7–10 in) long, plus 30–36 cm (12–14 in) tail Habitat: Forest Diet: Gum and sap, as well as seeds, fruit, nuts, insects, and small vertebrates	LC Unknown
Hershkovitz's marmoset	M. intermedius Hershkovitz, 1977	Central South America	Size: 18–30 cm (7–12 in) long, plus 17–41 cm (7–16 in) tail Habitat: Forest Diet: Fruit, flowers, nectar, gum, sap, frogs, snails, lizards, spiders, and insects	LC Unknown
Marca's marmoset	M. marcai Alperin, 1993	Central South America	Size: 18–30 cm (7–12 in) long, plus 17–41 cm (7–16 in) tail Habitat: Forest Diet: Fruit, flowers, nectar, gum, sap, frogs, snails, lizards, spiders, and insects	VU Unknown
Maués marmoset	M. mauesi R. A. Mittermeier, Schwarz & Ayres, 1992	Central South America	Size: 19–23 cm (7–9 in) long, plus 34–38 cm (13–15 in) tail Habitat: Forest Diet: Fruit, flowers, nectar, gum, sap, frogs, snails, lizards, spiders, and insects	LC Unknown
Munduruku marmoset	M. munduruku Costa-Araújo, Farias, Hrbek, 2019	Central South America	Size: 18–30 cm (7–12 in) long, plus 17–41 cm (7–16 in) tail Habitat: Forest Diet: Insects, spiders, small vertebrates, eggs, fruit, and sap	VU Unknown
Rio Acarí marmoset	M. acariensis (M. van Roosmalen, T. van Roosmalen, R. A. Mittermeier, & Rylands, 2000)	Central South America	Size: 18–30 cm (7–12 in) long, plus 17–41 cm (7–16 in) tail Habitat: Forest Diet: Fruit, flowers, nectar, gum, sap, frogs, snails, lizards, spiders, and insects	LC Unknown
Rondon's marmoset	M. rondoni Ferrari, Sena, Schneider, & Silva Jr., 2010	Central South America	Size: 18–30 cm (7–12 in) long, plus 17–41 cm (7–16 in) tail Habitat: Forest Diet: Fruit, flowers, nectar, gum, sap, frogs, snails, lizards, spiders, and insects	VU Unknown
Roosmalens' dwarf marmoset	M. humilis (M. Roosmalen, 1998)	Central South America	Size: 18–30 cm (7–12 in) long, plus 17–41 cm (7–16 in) tail Habitat: Forest Diet: Insects, fruit and gum	LC Unknown
Santarem marmoset	M. humeralifer (Geoffroy, 1812)	Central South America	Size: 18–30 cm (7–12 in) long, plus 17–41 cm (7–16 in) tail Habitat: Forest Diet: Fruit, flowers, nectar, gum, sap, frogs, snails, lizards, spiders, and insects	NT Unknown
Satéré marmoset	M. saterei Noronha & Silva Jr., 1998	Central South America	Size: 19–23 cm (7–9 in) long, plus 34–36 cm (13–14 in) tail Habitat: Forest Diet: Insects, spiders, small vertebrates, eggs, fruit, and sap	LC Unknown
Schneider's marmoset	M. schneideri Costa-Araújo et al., 2021	Central South America (in dark gray)	Size: 18–30 cm (7–12 in) long, plus 17–41 cm (7–16 in) tail Habitat: Forest Diet: Insects, spiders, small vertebrates, eggs, fruit, and sap	EN Unknown
Silvery marmoset	M. argentatus (Linnaeus, 1766)	Central South America	Size: 20–23 cm (8–9 in) long, plus 26–33 cm (10–13 in) tail Habitat: Forest and savanna Diet: Sap and gum, as well as fruit, insects, and leaves	LC Unknown
White marmoset	M. leucippe (Thomas, 1922)	Central South America	Size: 20–24 cm (8–9 in) long, plus 26–37 cm (10–15 in) tail Habitat: Forest Diet: Fruit, flowers, nectar, gum, sap, frogs, snails, lizards, spiders, and insects	LC Unknown

Genus Saguinus – Hoffmannsegg, 1807 – seventeen species
Common name	Scientific name and subspecies	Range	Size and ecology	IUCN status and estimated population
Brown-mantled tamarin	S. fuscicollis Spix, 1823 Four subspecies: S. f. avilapiresi (Avila Pires' saddle-back tamarin); S. f. fuscicollis (Spix's saddle-back tamarin); S. f. mura (Mura's saddleback tamarin); S. f. primitivus (Lako's saddleback tamarin)	West-central South America	Size: 21–23 cm (8–9 in) long, plus about 43 cm (17 in) tail Habitat: Forest Diet: Fruit, flowers, nectar, gum, sap, frogs, snails, lizards, spiders, and insects	LC Unknown
Black-mantled tamarin	S. nigricollis Spix, 1823 Three subspecies: S. n. graellsi (Graells's tamarin); S. n. hernandezi (Hernandez-Camacho's black-mantle tamarin); S. n. nigricollis (Spix's black mantle tamarin)	West-central South America	Size: 22–23 cm (9 in) long, plus 35–37 cm (14–15 in) tail Habitat: Forest Diet: Insects, fruit, seeds, flowers, nectar, and gum	LC Unknown
Black tamarin	S. niger (Geoffroy, 1803)	Eastern South America	Size: 17–31 cm (7–12 in) long, plus 25–44 cm (10–17 in) tail Habitat: Forest Diet: Fruit, flowers, nectar, gum, sap, frogs, snails, lizards, spiders, and insects	VU Unknown
Cotton-top tamarin	S. oedipus (Linnaeus, 1758)	Northwestern South America	Size: 20–25 cm (8–10 in) long, plus 33–40 cm (13–16 in) tail Habitat: Forest Diet: Insects, fruit, and gum	CR 2,000
Eastern black-handed tamarin	S. ursula Hoffmannsegg, 1807	Eastern South America	Size: 17–31 cm (7–12 in) long, plus 25–44 cm (10–17 in) tail Habitat: Forest Diet: Fruit, flowers, nectar, gum, sap, frogs, snails, lizards, spiders, and insects	VU Unknown
Emperor tamarin	S. imperator (Goeldi, 1907) Two subspecies: S. i. imperator (Black-chinned emperor tamarin); S. i. subgrisescens (Bearded emperor tamarin)	Western South America	Size: 23–27 cm (9–11 in) long, plus 35–43 cm (14–17 in) tail Habitat: Forest Diet: Fruit, insects, and tree sap, as well as lizards, tree frogs, and bird eggs	LC Unknown
Geoffroy's tamarin	S. geoffroyi (Pucheran, 1845)	Northwestern South America and southeastern Central America	Size: 20–29 cm (8–11 in) long, plus 31–42 cm (12–17 in) tail Habitat: Forest Diet: Fruit, flowers, nectar, gum, sap, frogs, snails, lizards, spiders, and insects	NT Unknown
Golden-handed tamarin	S. midas (Linnaeus, 1758)	Northeastern South America	Size: 20–28 cm (8–11 in) long, plus 31–44 cm (12–17 in) tail Habitat: Forest and savanna Diet: Fruit, flowers, nectar, gum, sap, frogs, snails, lizards, spiders, and insects	LC Unknown
Golden-mantled tamarin	S. tripartitus H. Milne-Edwards, 1878	Western South America	Size: 21–24 cm (8–9 in) long, plus 31–35 cm (12–14 in) tail Habitat: Forest Diet: Fruit, flowers, nectar, gum, sap, frogs, snails, lizards, spiders, and insects	NT Unknown
Martins's tamarin	S. martinsi (Thomas, 1912) Two subspecies: S. m. martinsi (Martin's bare-faced tamarin); S. m. ochraceus (Ochraceous bare-faced tamarin)	Central South America	Size: 17–31 cm (7–12 in) long, plus 25–44 cm (10–17 in) tail Habitat: Forest Diet: Fruit, flowers, nectar, gum, sap, frogs, snails, lizards, spiders, and insects	NT Unknown
Mottle-faced tamarin	S. inustus (Schwartz, 1951)	West-central South America	Size: 17–31 cm (7–12 in) long, plus 25–44 cm (10–17 in) tail Habitat: Forest Diet: Fruit, insects, and spiders	LC Unknown
Moustached tamarin	S. mystax (Spix, 1823) Two subspecies: S. m. mystax (Spix's moustached tamarin); S. m. pluto (White-rumped moustached tamarin)	West-central South America	Size: 24–25 cm (9–10 in) long, plus about 38 cm (15 in) tail Habitat: Forest Diet: Fruit, flowers, nectar, insects, sap, gum, and soil	LC Unknown
Pied tamarin	S. bicolor Spix, 1823	Central South America	Size: 20–29 cm (8–11 in) long, plus 33–42 cm (13–17 in) tail Habitat: Forest Diet: Fruit, flowers, and sap, as well as gum and insects	CR Unknown
Red-capped tamarin	S. pileatus I. Geoffroy & Deville, 1848	Central South America	Size: 17–31 cm (7–12 in) long, plus 25–44 cm (10–17 in) tail Habitat: Forest Diet: Fruit pulp, sap, nectar, invertebrates, and small vertebrates	LC Unknown
White-footed tamarin	S. leucopus (Günther, 1877)	Northwestern South America	Size: 17–31 cm (7–12 in) long, plus 25–44 cm (10–17 in) tail Habitat: Forest Diet: Fruit, flowers, nectar, gum, sap, frogs, snails, lizards, spiders, and insects	VU Unknown
White-lipped tamarin	S. labiatus (Humboldt, 1812) Three subspecies: S. l. labiatus; S. l. rufiventer; S. l. thomasi (Thomas' moustached tamarin)	Central South America	Size: 17–31 cm (7–12 in) long, plus 25–44 cm (10–17 in) tail Habitat: Forest Diet: Fruit, nectar, insects, and sap	LC Unknown
White-mantled tamarin	S. melanoleucus Miranda-Ribeiro, 1912	West-central South America	Size: 17–31 cm (7–12 in) long, plus 25–44 cm (10–17 in) tail Habitat: Forest Diet: Fruit, flowers, nectar, gum, sap, frogs, snails, lizards, spiders, and insects	LC Unknown

=== Family Cebidae ===
==== Subfamily Cebinae ====
Genus Cebus – Erxleben, 1777 – four species
Common name	Scientific name and subspecies	Range	Size and ecology	IUCN status and estimated population
Colombian white-faced capuchin	C. capucinus (Linnaeus, 1758) Three subspecies: C. c. capucinus; C. c. curtus (Gorgona white-faced capuchin); C. c. imitator (Panamanian white-faced capuchin)	Northwestern South America and southeastern Central America	Size: 33–46 cm (13–18 in) long, plus about 55 cm (22 in) tail Habitat: Forest and savanna Diet: Fruit and nuts, as well as insects, other invertebrates, and small vertebrates including squirrels, tree rats, lizards, and birds	VU Unknown
Kaapori capuchin	C. kaapori Queiroz, 1992	Northeastern South America	Size: 30–57 cm (12–22 in) long, plus 30–56 cm (12–22 in) tail Habitat: Forest Diet: Fruit, insects, and seeds	CR Unknown
Wedge-capped capuchin	C. olivaceus Schomburgk, 1848	Northern South America	Size: 37–46 cm (15–18 in) long, plus 40–55 cm (16–22 in) tail Habitat: Forest Diet: Fruit, palm nuts, seeds, berries, small vertebrates, and invertebrates	LC Unknown
Humboldt's white-fronted capuchin	C. albifrons Humboldt, 1812 Six subspecies: C. a. aequatorialis (Ecuadorian capuchin); C. a. albifrons (White-fronted capuchin); C. a. cuscinus (Shock-headed capuchin); C. a. trinitatis (Trinidad white-fronted capuchin); C. a. unicolor (Spix's white-fronted capuchin); C. a. versicolor (Varied white-fronted capuchin)	Central South America	Size: About 37 cm (15 in) long, plus about 42 cm (17 in) tail Habitat: Forest and savanna Diet: Fruit, as well as insects, other small invertebrates, palm nuts, figs, and nectar	LC Unknown

Genus Sapajus – Kerr, 1792 – seven species
Common name	Scientific name and subspecies	Range	Size and ecology	IUCN status and estimated population
Black capuchin	S. nigritus Goldfuss, 1809 Two subspecies: S. n. cucullatus; S. n. nigritus	Southeastern South America	Size: 32–55 cm (13–22 in) long, plus 35–50 cm (14–20 in) tail Habitat: Forest Diet: Fruit, berries, seeds, leaves, and nuts, as well as young frogs, birds, insects, and eggs	NT Unknown
Azaras's capuchin	S. cay (Illiger, 1815)	Central South America	Size: 30–57 cm (12–22 in) long, plus 30–56 cm (12–22 in) tail Habitat: Forest and savanna Diet: Fruit, seeds, arthropods, frogs, birds, primates, and small mammals, as well as stems and flower buds	VU Unknown
Black-striped capuchin	S. libidinosus Spix, 1823	Eastern South America	Size: 30–57 cm (12–22 in) long, plus 30–56 cm (12–22 in) tail Habitat: Forest and savanna Diet: Fruit, seeds, arthropods, frogs, birds, and small mammals, as well as stems, flowers, and leaves	NT Unknown
Blond capuchin	S. flavius Schreber, 1774	Eastern South America	Size: 33–40 cm (13–16 in) long, plus 36–50 cm (14–20 in) tail Habitat: Forest Diet: Fruit, insects, palm nuts, and sugar cane	EN 500
Crested capuchin	S. robustus Kuhl, 1820	Eastern South America	Size: 30–57 cm (12–22 in) long, plus 30–56 cm (12–22 in) tail Habitat: Forest Diet: Fruit, seeds, arthropods, frogs, birds, and small mammals, as well as stems, flowers, and leaves	EN Unknown
Golden-bellied capuchin	S. xanthosternos Wied-Neuwied, 1826	Eastern South America	Size: 35–49 cm (14–19 in) long, plus 37–49 cm (15–19 in) tail Habitat: Forest, savanna, and shrubland Diet: Fruit, seeds, nectar, pith, stems, nuts, berries, flowers, leaves, bird eggs, insects, frogs, small reptiles, birds, bats, other small mammals, oysters, and crabs	CR 2,500
Tufted capuchin	S. apella (Linnaeus, 1758) Two subspecies: C. a. apella; C. a. margaritae (Margarita Island capuchin)	Northern South America	Size: 38–46 cm (15–18 in) long, plus 38–39 cm (15–15 in) tail Habitat: Forest and savanna Diet: Vegetation, seeds, pith, eggs, insects, reptiles, birds, and small mammals	LC Unknown

==== Subfamily Saimiriinae ====
Genus Saimiri – Voigt, 1831 – seven species
Common name	Scientific name and subspecies	Range	Size and ecology	IUCN status and estimated population
Bare-eared squirrel monkey	S. ustus (I. Geoffroy, 1843)	Central South America	Size: 26–36 cm (10–14 in) long, plus 35–43 cm (14–17 in) tail Habitat: Forest Diet: Fruit, insects, and spiders, as well as flowers, nectar, seeds, bird eggs, and small vertebrates	NT Unknown
Black squirrel monkey	S. vanzolinii Ayres, 1985	Central South America	Size: About 32 cm (13 in) long, plus 41 cm (16 in) tail Habitat: Forest Diet: Fruit and insects, as well as small vertebrates, flowers, seeds, leaves, and nectar	EN Unknown
Black-capped squirrel monkey	S. boliviensis (I. Geoffroy & Blainville, 1834) Two subspecies: S. b. boliviensis (Bolivian squirrel monkey); S. b. peruviensis (Peruvian squirrel monkey)	Western South America	Size: 27–32 cm (11–13 in) long, plus 38–42 cm (15–17 in) tail Habitat: Forest Diet: Insects and fruit, as well as berries, nuts, flowers, seeds, leaves, arachnids, small vertebrates, and eggs	LC Unknown
Central American squirrel monkey	S. oerstedii Reinhardt, 1872 Two subspecies: S. o. citrinellus (Grey-crowned Central American squirrel monkey); S. o. oerstedii (Black-crowned Central American squirrel monkey)	Southern Central America	Size: 22–30 cm (9–12 in) long, plus 37–47 cm (15–19 in) tail Habitat: Forest Diet: Fruit, berries, seeds, gums, leaves, buds, insects, arachnids, and small vertebrates	EN Unknown
Collins' squirrel monkey	S. collinsi (Osgood, 1914)	Northern South America (in red)	Size: 26–30 cm (10–12 in) long, plus 38–39 cm (15–15 in) tail Habitat: Forest Diet: Fruit and insects	LC Unknown
Guianan squirrel monkey	S. sciureus (Linnaeus, 1758)	Northern South America (in green)	Size: About 32 cm (13 in) long, plus 41 cm (16 in) tail Habitat: Forest Diet: Fruit and insects, as well as leaves and seeds	LC Unknown
Humboldt's squirrel monkey	S. cassiquiarensis (Lesson, 1840) Three subspecies: S. c. albigena; S. c. cassiquiarensis; S. c. macrodon	Northwestern South America (in yellow)	Size: 25–35 cm (10–14 in) long, plus about 38 cm (15 in) tail Habitat: Forest Diet: Arthropods, fruit, and flowers	LC Unknown

=== Family Pitheciidae ===
==== Subfamily Callicebinae ====
Genus Callicebus – Thomas, 1903 – five species
Common name	Scientific name and subspecies	Range	Size and ecology	IUCN status and estimated population
Atlantic titi monkey	C. personatus (Geoffroy, 1812)	Eastern South America	Size: 31–42 cm (12–17 in) long, plus 41–56 cm (16–22 in) tail Habitat: Forest Diet: Fruit pulp, leaves, insects, and seeds	VU Unknown
Barbara Brown's titi monkey	C. barbarabrownae (Hershkovitz, 1990)	Eastern South America	Size: 23–46 cm (9–18 in) long, plus 26–56 cm (10–22 in) tail Habitat: Savanna and shrubland Diet: Fruit, as well as leaves, vegetation, insects, eggs, and small vertebrates and invertebrates	CR 100-250
Black-fronted titi monkey	C. nigrifrons (Spix, 1823)	Eastern South America	Size: 23–46 cm (9–18 in) long, plus 26–56 cm (10–22 in) tail Habitat: Forest Diet: Fruit, leaves, and flowers, as well as arthropods	NT Unknown
Coastal black-handed titi monkey	C. melanochir (Wied-Neuwied, 1820)	Eastern South America	Size: 23–46 cm (9–18 in) long, plus 26–56 cm (10–22 in) tail Habitat: Forest Diet: Fruit, seeds, and leaves	VU Unknown
Coimbra Filho's titi monkey	C. coimbrai Kobayashi, 1999	Eastern South America	Size: 23–46 cm (9–18 in) long, plus 26–56 cm (10–22 in) tail Habitat: Forest and savanna Diet: Fruit, leaves, flowers, seeds, and insects, as well as birds	EN 250–2,500

Genus Cheracebus – Byrne et al., 2016 – five species
Common name	Scientific name and subspecies	Range	Size and ecology	IUCN status and estimated population
Black titi monkey	C. lugens (Humboldt, 1811)	Northern South America	Size: 23–46 cm (9–18 in) long, plus 26–56 cm (10–22 in) tail Habitat: Forest and savanna Diet: Fruit, seeds, leaves, stems, flowers, insects, and spiders	LC Unknown
Collared titi monkey	C. torquatus (Hoffmannsegg, 1807)	Central South America	Size: 23–36 cm (9–14 in) long, plus about 46 cm (18 in) tail Habitat: Forest Diet: Fruit and seeds, as well as leaves and insects	LC Unknown
Colombian black-handed titi monkey	C. medemi (Hershkovitz, 1963)	Northwestern South America	Size: 23–46 cm (9–18 in) long, plus 26–56 cm (10–22 in) tail Habitat: Forest Diet: Fruit pulp, leaves, insects and seeds	VU Unknown
Lucifer titi monkey	C. lucifer (Thomas, 1914)	Northwestern South America	Size: 30–45 cm (12–18 in) long, plus 39–50 cm (15–20 in) tail Habitat: Forest Diet: Fruit, as well as leaves, insects, and bird eggs	LC Unknown
Red-headed titi monkey	C. regulus (Thomas, 1927)	Northwestern South America	Size: 23–46 cm (9–18 in) long, plus 26–56 cm (10–22 in) tail Habitat: Forest Diet: Fruit pulp, leaves, insects and seeds	LC Unknown

Genus Plecturocebus – Byrne et al., 2016 – 22 species
Common name	Scientific name and subspecies	Range	Size and ecology	IUCN status and estimated population
Ashy black titi monkey	P. cinerascens (Spix, 1823)	Central South America	Size: 23–46 cm (9–18 in) long, plus 26–56 cm (10–22 in) tail Habitat: Forest Diet: Fruit pulp, leaves, insects and seeds	LC Unknown
Baptista Lake titi monkey	P. baptista Lönnberg, 1939	Central South America	Size: 23–46 cm (9–18 in) long, plus 26–56 cm (10–22 in) tail Habitat: Forest Diet: Fruit pulp, leaves, insects and seeds	LC Unknown
Brown titi monkey	P. brunneus (Wagner, 1842)	West-central South America	Size: 23–46 cm (9–18 in) long, plus 26–56 cm (10–22 in) tail Habitat: Forest Diet: Fruit pulp, leaves, insects and seeds	VU Unknown
Caquetá titi monkey	P. caquetensis Defler, Bueno, & García, 2010	Northwestern South America	Size: 31–34 cm (12–13 in) long, plus 36–64 cm (14–25 in) tail Habitat: Forest Diet: Fruit, seeds, and leaves, as well as flowers, arthropods, and stems	CR Unknown
Chestnut-bellied titi monkey	P. caligatus (Wagner, 1842)	Central South America	Size: 23–46 cm (9–18 in) long, plus 26–56 cm (10–22 in) tail Habitat: Forest Diet: Fruit pulp, leaves, insects and seeds	LC Unknown
Coppery titi monkey	P. cupreus (Spix, 1823)	Western South America	Size: 28–39 cm (11–15 in) long, plus about 7–13 cm (3–5 in) tail Habitat: Forest Diet: Fruit pulp, leaves, insects and seeds	LC Unknown
Hershkovitz's titi monkey	P. dubius (Hershkovitz, 1988)	Western South America	Size: 23–46 cm (9–18 in) long, plus 26–56 cm (10–22 in) tail Habitat: Forest Diet: Fruit pulp, leaves, insects and seeds	LC Unknown
Hoffmanns's titi monkey	P. hoffmannsi (Thomas, 1908)	Central South America	Size: 23–46 cm (9–18 in) long, plus 26–56 cm (10–22 in) tail Habitat: Forest Diet: Fruit pulp, leaves, insects and seeds	LC Unknown
Madidi titi monkey	P. aureipalatii (Wallace, Gómez, A. M. Felton, & A. Felton, 2006)	Western South America	Size: 29–32 cm (11–13 in) long, plus 48–53 cm (19–21 in) tail Habitat: Forest Diet: Fruit pulp, leaves, insects and seeds	LC Unknown
Milton's titi monkey	P. miltoni Dalponte, Silva, & Silva Júnior, 2014	Central South America	Size: 23–46 cm (9–18 in) long, plus 26–56 cm (10–22 in) tail Habitat: Forest Diet: Fruit, as well as leaves, vegetation, insects, eggs, and small vertebrates and invertebrates	DD Unknown
Olalla brothers' titi monkey	P. olallae Lönnberg, 1939	Western South America	Size: 23–46 cm (9–18 in) long, plus 26–56 cm (10–22 in) tail Habitat: Forest and savanna Diet: Fruit and leaves	CR Unknown
Ornate titi monkey	P. ornatus (Gray, 1866)	Northwestern South America	Size: 30–36 cm (12–14 in) long, plus 38–45 cm (15–18 in) tail Habitat: Forest Diet: Fruit, as well as insects, leaves, and flowers	VU Unknown
Prince Bernhard's titi monkey	P. bernhardi (M. van Roosmalen, T. van Roosmalen, & R. A. Mittermeier, 2002)	Central South America	Size: 23–46 cm (9–18 in) long, plus 26–56 cm (10–22 in) tail Habitat: Forest Diet: Fruit pulp, leaves, insects and seeds	LC Unknown
Red-bellied titi monkey	P. moloch (Hoffmannsegg, 1807)	Northeast-central South America	Size: 27–43 cm (11–17 in) long, plus 35–55 cm (14–22 in) tail Habitat: Forest Diet: Fruit, as well as leaves, insects, eggs, and small vertebrates	LC Unknown
Rio Beni titi monkey	P. modestus (Lönnberg, 1939)	Western South America	Size: 23–46 cm (9–18 in) long, plus 26–56 cm (10–22 in) tail Habitat: Forest and savanna Diet: Fruit, as well as flowers and invertebrates	EN Unknown
Rio Mayo titi monkey	P. oenanthe (Thomas, 1924)	Western South America	Size: 23–46 cm (9–18 in) long, plus 26–56 cm (10–22 in) tail Habitat: Forest Diet: Fruit and insects, as well as seeds, flowers, leaves, and shoots	CR Unknown
Stephen Nash's titi monkey	P. stephennashi M. van Roosmalen, T. van Roosmalen, & R. A. Mittermeier, 2002)	Central South America	Size: 23–46 cm (9–18 in) long, plus 26–56 cm (10–22 in) tail Habitat: Unknown Diet: Fruit pulp, leaves, insects, and seeds	DD Unknown
Toppin's titi monkey	P. toppini (Thomas, 1914)	Western South America	Size: 23–46 cm (9–18 in) long, plus 26–56 cm (10–22 in) tail Habitat: Forest Diet: Fruit, as well as leaves and insects	LC Unknown
Urubamba brown titi monkey	P. urubambensis (Vermeer & Tello-Alvarado, 2015)	Western South America	Size: 23–46 cm (9–18 in) long, plus 26–56 cm (10–22 in) tail Habitat: Forest Diet: Fruit pulp, leaves, insects, and seeds	LC Unknown
Vieira's titi monkey	P. vieirai Gualda-Barros, Nascimento, & Amaral, 2012	Central South America	Size: 23–46 cm (9–18 in) long, plus 26–56 cm (10–22 in) tail Habitat: Forest Diet: Fruit, as well as leaves, vegetation, insects, eggs, and small vertebrates and invertebrates	CR Unknown
White-coated titi monkey	P. pallescens (Thomas, 1907)	Central South America	Size: 23–46 cm (9–18 in) long, plus 26–56 cm (10–22 in) tail Habitat: Forest and savanna Diet: Fruit, flowers, and vines	LC Unknown
White-eared titi monkey	P. donacophilus (d'Orbigny, 1836)	West-central South America	Size: About 32 cm (13 in) long, plus 48–51 cm (19–20 in) tail Habitat: Forest Diet: Fruit, as well as leaves, seeds, and insects	LC Unknown
White-tailed titi monkey	P. discolor (I. Geoffroy & Deville, 1848)	Northwestern South America	Size: 29–45 cm (11–18 in) long, plus 35–64 cm (14–25 in) tail Habitat: Forest Diet: Fruit, seeds, and flowers	LC Unknown

==== Subfamily Pitheciinae ====
Genus Cacajao – Lesson, 1840 – seven species
Common name	Scientific name and subspecies	Range	Size and ecology	IUCN status and estimated population
Aracá uakari	C. ayresi Boubli et al., 2008	North-central South America	Size: 30–57 cm (12–22 in) long, plus 12–21 cm (5–8 in) tail Habitat: Forest Diet: Fruit, nuts, flowers, leaves, and insects	LC Unknown
Golden-backed uakari	C. melanocephalus (Humboldt, 1811)	Northern South America	Size: 36–49 cm (14–19 in) long, plus 18–25 cm (7–10 in) tail Habitat: Forest Diet: Fruit and seeds	LC Unknown
Neblina uakari	C. hosomi Boubli et al., 2008	Northern South America	Size: 43–49 cm (17–19 in) long, plus 36–45 cm (14–18 in) tail Habitat: Forest and savanna Diet: Seeds, as well as fruit pulp, leaves, and arthropods	VU Unknown
Novae's bald-headed uakari	C. novaesi Hershkovitz, 1987	Western South America	Size: 38–57 cm (15–22 in) long, plus 14–19 cm (6–7 in) tail Habitat: Forest Diet: Seeds, fruit, leaves, nectar, and insects	NT Unknown
Red bald-headed uakari	C. rubicundus (I. Geoffroy & Deville, 1848)	Western South America	Size: 38–57 cm (15–22 in) long, plus 14–19 cm (6–7 in) tail Habitat: Forest Diet: Seeds, fruit, leaves, nectar, and insects	LC Unknown
Ucayali bald-headed uakari	C. ucayalii Thomas, 1928	Western South America	Size: 38–57 cm (15–22 in) long, plus 14–19 cm (6–7 in) tail Habitat: Forest Diet: Seeds, fruit, leaves, nectar, and insects	VU Unknown
White bald-headed uakari	C. calvus (I. Geoffroy, 1847)	Western South America	Size: 38–57 cm (15–22 in) long, plus 14–19 cm (6–7 in) tail Habitat: Forest Diet: Seeds, fruit, leaves, nectar, and insects	LC Unknown

Genus Chiropotes – Lesson, 1840 – five species
Common name	Scientific name and subspecies	Range	Size and ecology	IUCN status and estimated population
Black bearded saki	C. satanas (Hoffmannsegg, 1807)	Northeastern South America	Size: 32–48 cm (13–19 in) long, plus 37–47 cm (15–19 in) tail Habitat: Forest Diet: Seeds, as well as fruit, flowers, leaf stalks, and arthropods	EN Unknown
Reddish-brown bearded saki	C. sagulatus (Traill, 1821)	Northeastern South America	Size: 32–52 cm (13–20 in) long, plus 30–51 cm (12–20 in) tail Habitat: Forest Diet: Fruit and seeds, as well as flowers, stems, and arthropods	LC Unknown
Red-backed bearded saki	C. chiropotes (Humboldt, 1811)	Northern South America	Size: 32–52 cm (13–20 in) long, plus 30–51 cm (12–20 in) tail Habitat: Forest Diet: Seeds, fruit, and nuts, as well as insects	LC Unknown
Uta Hick's bearded saki	C. utahickae Hershkovitz, 1985	Northern South America	Size: 32–52 cm (13–20 in) long, plus 30–51 cm (12–20 in) tail Habitat: Forest Diet: Seeds, fruit, and flowers, as well as insects, leaves, and stems	VU Unknown
White-nosed saki	C. albinasus (I. Geoffroy & Deville, 1848)	Central South America	Size: 41–48 cm (16–19 in) long, plus 30–51 cm (12–20 in) tail Habitat: Forest Diet: Fruit, nuts, and insects	VU Unknown

Genus Pithecia – Desmarest, 1804 – thirteen species
Common name	Scientific name and subspecies	Range	Size and ecology	IUCN status and estimated population
Burnished saki	P. inusta Spix, 1823	Western South America	Size: 30–71 cm (12–28 in) long, plus 25–55 cm (10–22 in) tail Habitat: Forest Diet: Seeds, fruit pulp, leaves, insects, and flowers	LC Unknown
Cazuza's saki	P. cazuzai Marsh, 2014	Central South America	Size: 30–71 cm (12–28 in) long, plus 25–55 cm (10–22 in) tail Habitat: Forest Diet: Seeds, fruit pulp, leaves, insects, and flowers	DD Unknown
Equatorial saki	P. aequatorialis Hershkovitz, 1987	Western South America	Size: 30–71 cm (12–28 in) long, plus 25–55 cm (10–22 in) tail Habitat: Forest Diet: Seeds, fruit pulp, leaves, insects, and flowers	LC Unknown
Golden-faced saki	P. chrysocephala I. Geoffroy, 1850	Central South America	Size: 30–71 cm (12–28 in) long, plus 25–55 cm (10–22 in) tail Habitat: Forest Diet: Seeds, fruit pulp, leaves, insects, and flowers	LC Unknown
Hairy saki	P. hirsuta Spix, 1823	Western South America	Size: 30–71 cm (12–28 in) long, plus 25–55 cm (10–22 in) tail Habitat: Forest Diet: Seeds, fruit pulp, leaves, insects, and flowers	LC Unknown
Isabel's saki	P. isabela Marsh, 2014	Western South America	Size: 30–71 cm (12–28 in) long, plus 25–55 cm (10–22 in) tail Habitat: Forest Diet: Seeds, fruit pulp, leaves, insects, and flowers	DD Unknown
Miller's saki	P. milleri Allen, 1914	Northwestern South America	Size: 30–71 cm (12–28 in) long, plus 25–55 cm (10–22 in) tail Habitat: Forest Diet: Seeds, fruit pulp, leaves, insects, and flowers	VU Unknown
Monk saki	P. monachus (Geoffroy, 1812)	Northwestern South America	Size: 41–50 cm (16–20 in) long, plus 40–50 cm (16–20 in) tail Habitat: Forest Diet: Seeds, fruit pulp, leaves, insects, and flowers	LC Unknown
Napo saki	P. napensis Lönnberg, 1938	Northwestern South America	Size: 20–50 cm (8–20 in) long, plus 20–50 cm (8–20 in) tail Habitat: Forest Diet: Seeds, fruit pulp, leaves, insects, and flowers	LC Unknown
Rio Tapajós saki	P. irrorata Gray, 1842	Central South America	Size: About 41 cm (16 in) long, plus about 47 cm (19 in) tail Habitat: Forest Diet: Seeds, fruit pulp, leaves, insects, and flowers	DD Unknown
Vanzolini's bald-faced saki	P. vanzolinii Hershkovitz, 1987	West-central South America	Size: 30–71 cm (12–28 in) long, plus 25–55 cm (10–22 in) tail Habitat: Forest Diet: Seeds, fruit pulp, leaves, insects, and flowers	DD Unknown
White-faced saki	P. pithecia (Linnaeus, 1766)	Northern South America	Size: 28–46 cm (11–18 in) long, plus 32–46 cm (13–18 in) tail Habitat: Forest Diet: Seeds, and leaves, as well as insects and flowers	LC Unknown
White-footed saki	P. albicans Gray, 1860	Central South America	Size: 36–56 cm (14–22 in) long, plus 36–56 cm (14–22 in) tail Habitat: Forest Diet: Seeds, fruit pulp, leaves, insects, and flowers	LC Unknown

== Sources ==
- Burnie, David; Wilson, Don E., eds. (2017). Animal. DK. ISBN 978-1-4654-7086-7.
- Nowak, Ronald M. (1999). Walker's Primates of the World. Johns Hopkins University Press. ISBN 978-0-8018-6251-9.
- Groves, Colin P. (2005). Wilson, Don E.; Reeder, DeeAnn M. (eds.). Mammal Species of the World. Vol. 1 (3rd ed.). Johns Hopkins University Press. ISBN 978-0-8018-8221-0.
