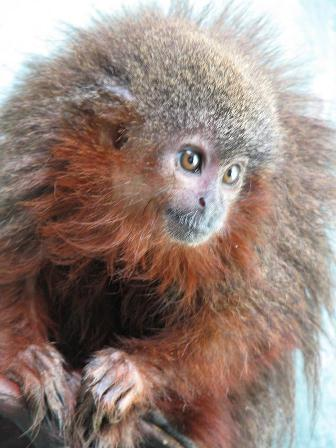

Conservation status
- Critically Endangered (IUCN 3.1)

Scientific classification
- Kingdom: Animalia
- Phylum: Chordata
- Class: Mammalia
- Infraclass: Placentalia
- Order: Primates
- Family: Pitheciidae
- Genus: Plecturocebus
- Species: P. caquetensis

Binomial name
- Plecturocebus caquetensis Defler, et al., 2010
- P. caquetensis on map of Caquetá department, Colombia

Synonyms
- Callicebus caquetensis

= Caquetá titi monkey =

Caquetá titi

Species of New World monkey

The Caquetá titi monkey (Plecturocebus caquetensis), also known as the red-bearded titi or the bushy-bearded titi, is a species of titi monkey endemic to Colombia found in the Department of Caquetá region. Taxonomically, it is a member of the "Callicebus cupreus group" (now Plecturocebus cupreus), following Shunsuke Kobayashi's Callicebus grouping. It was first described by Thomas Defler, Marta Bueno and Javier Garcia in 2010. It is highly endangered due to habitat fragmentation and a small population.

== Description ==
Its fur is generally brown, with a lighter tail and chestnut-red undersides, neck and cheeks. It is similar in appearance to the ornate titi and white-tailed titi except that it does not have a white forehead bar, nor does it have the white hands and feet of the ornate titi. It also has a red beard. It has 22 chromosome pairs (not counting the sex chromosomes), with a diploid chromosome number of 2n=46. Its body is approximately 35 cm long and its tail 61 cm, it weighs between 800 and 1400 g.

== Distribution and habitat ==
The species occurs between the Río Orteguaza and the Río Caquetá in the Colombian Department of Caquetá at altitudes between 190 and 260 m, but the exact distribution area is still unknown.

== Conservation ==
In the paper describing the species, the authors recommend that the species be classified as critically endangered by the International Union for Conservation of Nature (IUCN). According to the authors' estimate, the population size of the species may be fewer than 250 adult animals. It lives in forests fragmented by agricultural activity, and dispersal is hazardous since it must cross open savanna or barbed wire in order to reach new nearby forest fragments. The species has a geographic range of just about 100 square kilometers (39 sq mi) and actually occupies only about 10 square kilometers (3.9 sq mi) within that range.

P. caquetensis has been listed among the World's 25 Most Endangered Primates in 2017.

Preliminary satellite analyses with Ladsat images show that from 1989 to 2002, 50 % of the primary forests in the species' range have been lost and the pasture areas have doubled. By 2002 only 32 % of the area still retained some vegetation cover (primary, secondary and flooded forest) in which Callicebus caquetensis can survive; however, the area corresponding to secondary forests (531 hectares) is severely fragmented and the primary and flooded forests are restricted to the banks of the Orteguaza and Caquetá rivers.

== Biology ==
All 13 groups studied consisted of a single adult male, a single adult female and between one and four immature monkeys. Average group size, including adults and immatures, was 4.1 monkeys. This is consistent with other titi monkey species, which form small, cohesive groups led by a bonded pair of adults. Like other titi monkey species, they are monogamous and pairs raise about one baby each year. Babies make purring noises similar to cats when they are content. Titi monkey diets typically consist primarily of fruit, with leaves the second most important food item, and with seeds forming only a small portion of the diet.
