= Aracá uakari =

Conservation status
- Least Concern (IUCN 3.1)
- CITES Appendix I

Scientific classification
- Kingdom: Animalia
- Phylum: Chordata
- Class: Mammalia
- Order: Primates
- Family: Pitheciidae
- Genus: Cacajao
- Species: C. ayresi

Binomial name
- Cacajao ayresi Boubli et al., 2008
- species range

Species of New World monkey

The Aracá uakari (Cacajao ayresi), also known as the Ayres black uakari, is a newly described species of monkey from the northwest Brazilian Amazon. It was found by Jean-Phillipe Boubli of the University of Auckland after following native Yanomamo Indians on their hunts along the Rio Aracá, a northern tributary of the Rio Negro. It was subsequently described in 2008 together with the more westerly distributed Neblina uakari. Until then, the black-headed uakari was the only species of mainly black uakari that was recognized. Stephen F. Ferrari et al proposed treating the Aracá uakari as a subspecies of the black-headed uakari rather than as a separate species.

This monkey is named after Brazilian biologist José Márcio Ayres, formerly a senior zoologist for the Wildlife Conservation Society. José Márcio Ayres, who died in 2003, pioneered studies in uakaris and played a fundamental role in the creation of the Mamirauá Sustainable Development Reserve, which is of great importance for the white uakari.

Very little is known about the Aracá uakari, but based on present knowledge it has the smallest distribution of all species of uakaris (possibly as small as 5,000–6,000 square kilometres (1,900–2,300 mi^{2})) and is the only one not found in any protected area. Although few people live within its very remote distribution, it is hunted; at least seasonally. It has been suggested it should be considered endangered, but it is currently listed as least concern by the IUCN.
