= Kanamari white uakari =

Conservation status
- Least Concern (IUCN 3.1)

Scientific classification
- Kingdom: Animalia
- Phylum: Chordata
- Class: Mammalia
- Infraclass: Placentalia
- Order: Primates
- Family: Pitheciidae
- Genus: Cacajao
- Species: C. amuna

Binomial name
- Cacajao amuna Silva, Amaral, Roos, Bowler, Röhe, Sampaio, Bertuol, Santana, Silva Júnior, Rylands et al., 2022

Species of New World monkey

The Kanamari white uakari (Cacajao amuna) is a species of New World monkey native to western Brazil.
