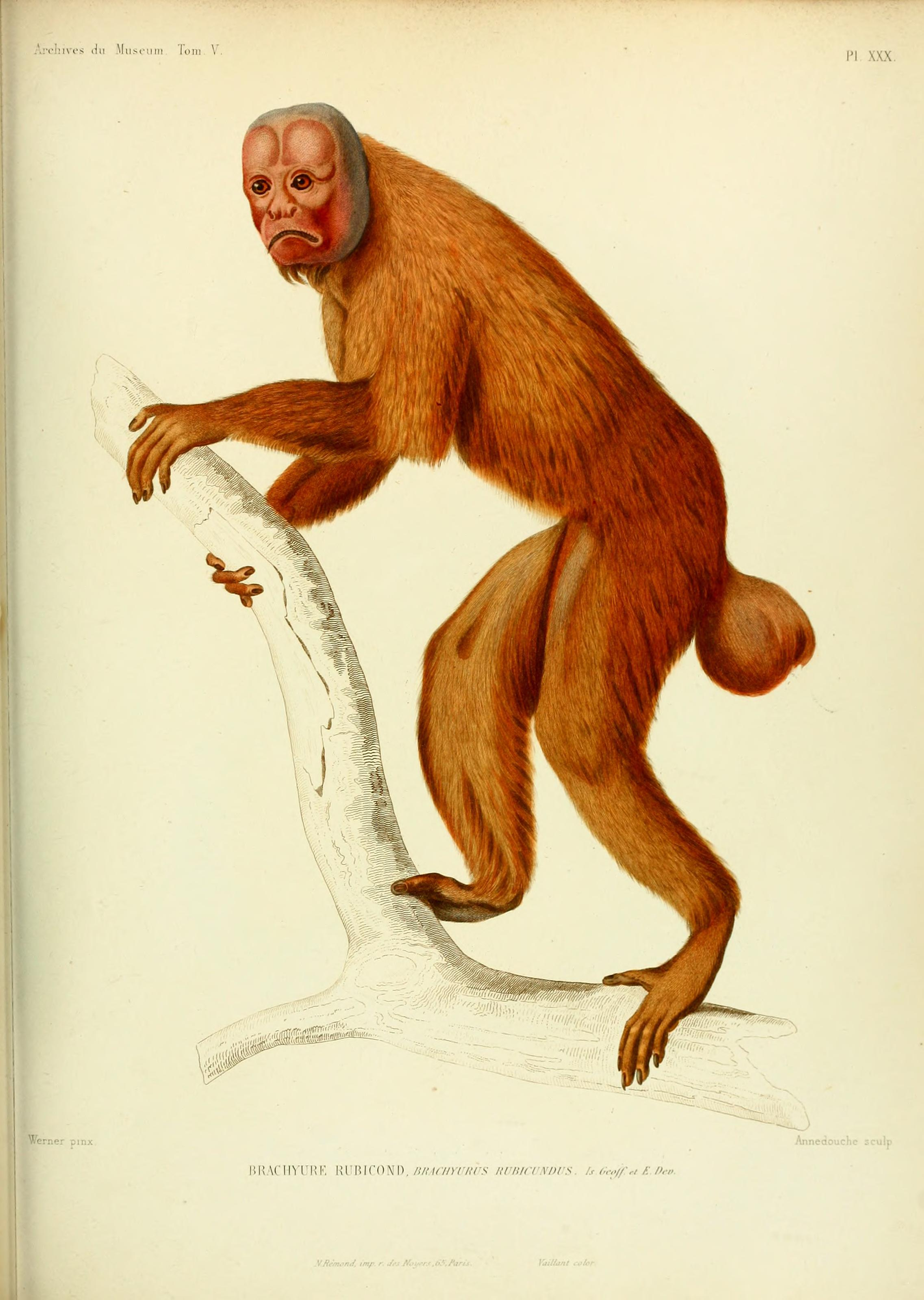

Conservation status
- Least Concern (IUCN 3.1)

Scientific classification
- Kingdom: Animalia
- Phylum: Chordata
- Class: Mammalia
- Order: Primates
- Suborder: Haplorhini
- Family: Pitheciidae
- Genus: Cacajao
- Species: C. rubicundus

Binomial name
- Cacajao rubicundus (I. Geoffroy & Deville, 1848)

= Red bald-headed uakari =

Species of monkey

The red bald-headed uakari (Cacajao rubicundus) is a species of New World monkey. It is native to Brazil.
