= Anne Magurran =

British ecologist

Anne Elizabeth Magurran CBE FRSE (born 1955) is a British Professor of ecology at University of St Andrews in Scotland. She is the author of several books on measuring biological diversity, and the importance for quantifying biodiversity for conservation. She has won numerous awards and honors, is regularly consulted for global assessments and analyses of biodiversity and conservation and her research is often highlighted by journalists.

Magurran has worked with Robert May and other leading biologists, including Helder Queiroz, whom she advised. Her research projects often focus on tropical freshwater fish communities - specifically the Trinidadian guppy- in the Neotropics and India.

== Research and career ==
Magurran completed her PhD at the University of Ulster on the biological diversity of native woodlands in Ireland. She then went on to complete postdoctoral work at Bangor University and the University of Oxford. Throughout her career she has used fish communities to study biodiversity, the evolution of biodiversity, and on the role of predation in the evolution of social behaviour. She is now a professor at the University of St Andrews, where she is the university's most cited female scientist. Globally, she is the second most cited female ecologist and evolutionary biologist. She is an international counselor and advisor on issues of conservation related to biodiversity and engaged in the UN Convention on Biological Diversity and in the World Economic Forum in 2018.

Magurran was appointed Commander of the Order of the British Empire (CBE) in the 2022 New Year Honours for services to biodiversity.

== Selected awards and honours ==
- 2022 - Distinguished Service Award from the Europe Section of the Society for Conservation Biology (SCB)
- 2022 - Commander of the Order of the British Empire (CBE)
- 2021 - Member of the Royal Irish Academy.
- 2017 - Plenary Talk, Argentinian International Ecology Meeting
- 2014 - Honorary Doctor of Science Degree, University of Bergen
- 2012 - Royal Society Wolfson Research Merit Award
- 2006 - Honorary Life Membership, Fisheries Society of the British Isles
- 2004 - Fellow of the Royal Society of Edinburgh
- 1994 - Scientific Medal, Zoological Society of London

== Selected publications ==
- Magurran, Anne E. (1988). Ecological Diversity and Its Measurement. Princeton: Princeton University Press. ISBN 9780691084916.
- Magurran, A. E. 2004. Measuring biological diversity. Oxford: Blackwell Publishing. ISBN 0-632-05633-9
- Magurran, Anne E. (2005). Evolutionary Ecology: The Trinidadian Guppy. Oxford University Press. ISBN 0198527853.
- Magurran, A. E. & R. M. May (eds.). 1999. Evolution of Biological Diversity. Oxford University Press. ISBN 0-19-850304-0.
