= Novaes' bald-headed uakari =

Conservation status
- Near Threatened (IUCN 3.1)

Scientific classification
- Kingdom: Animalia
- Phylum: Chordata
- Class: Mammalia
- Order: Primates
- Suborder: Haplorhini
- Family: Pitheciidae
- Genus: Cacajao
- Species: C. novaesi

Binomial name
- Cacajao novaesi Hershkovitz, 1987

Species of monkey

Novaes' bald-headed uakari (Cacajao novaesi) is a species of New World monkey. It is native to Brazil.
