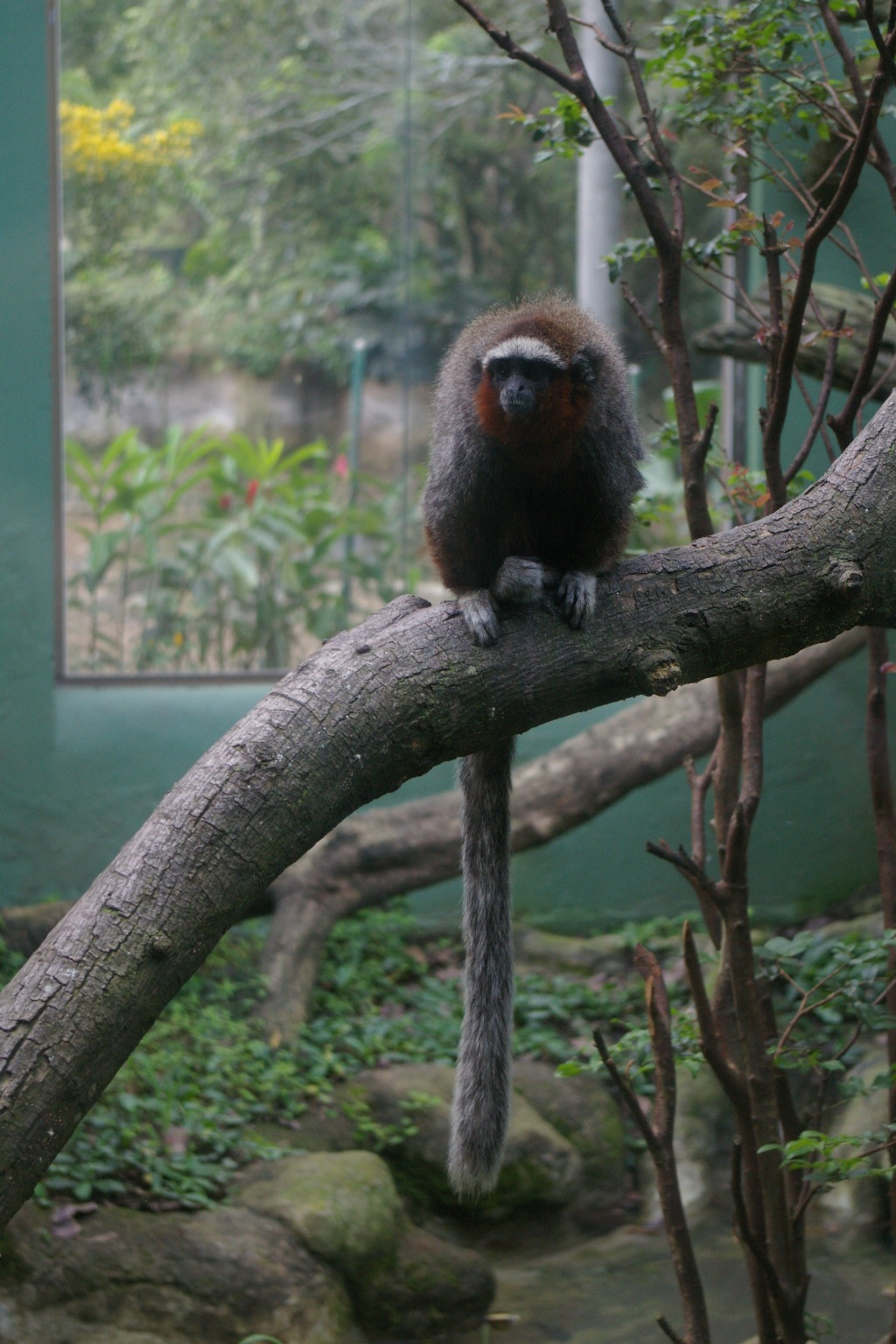
- Ornate titi in Cali Zoo

Conservation status
- Vulnerable (IUCN 3.1)

Scientific classification
- Kingdom: Animalia
- Phylum: Chordata
- Class: Mammalia
- Infraclass: Placentalia
- Order: Primates
- Family: Pitheciidae
- Genus: Plecturocebus
- Species: P. ornatus

Binomial name
- Plecturocebus ornatus (J. E. Gray, 1866)
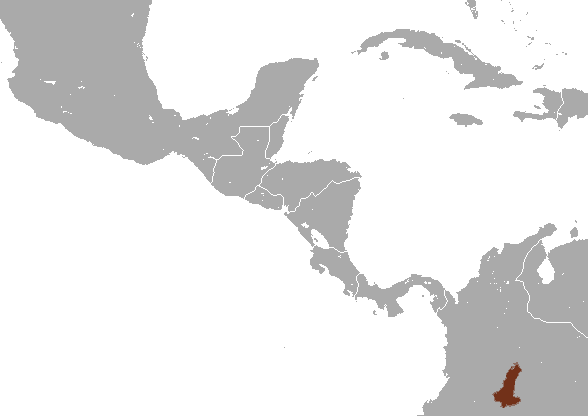
- Ornate titi range

Synonyms
- Callicebus ornatus Gray, 1866

= Ornate titi monkey =

Ornate titi

Species of New World monkey

The ornate titi monkey (Plecturocebus ornatus) is a species of titi monkey and is the smallest member of the family Pitheciidae, which also includes uakaris and saki monkeys. As it is a member of this family, it is classified as a type of New World monkey. It is endemic to eastern Colombia, and the only member of the Plecturocebus moloch group to occur north of the Rios Amazonas/Solimes/Napo axis, living at least 350 km away from the closest other member, the white-tailed titi (Plecturocebus discolor), which lives in the south of Colombia. It was once classified as the same species as the white-tailed titi, but is now officially recognized as its own species. The ornate titi is also terrestrial.

The ornate titi is present on the IUCN Red List of endangered species, being recognized as "Vulnerable", and having a general decrease in population trends.

== Description ==
The ornate titi has a thick, dense, fluffy, coat, with white ears and forehead, and grey hands and feet. The rest of the body is a bright chestnut red, apart from the tail, which is a dark-reddish brown or black, becoming white at the tip, and, similar to most titi species, is longer than its body. Male and female ornate titis do not differentiate significantly in appearance, however, generally, females tend to be larger, with an average male body length of 633 mm, and an average female body length of 752 mm.

== Biology ==
=== Habitat and threats ===
The ornate titi lives in the department of Cundinamarca (Medina) north as far as the lower Upa and Meta rivers, and south into the department of Meta, along the base of the Cordillera Oriental and the Sierra de la Macarena to the Guayabero Tiver and the upper Guaviare river. It mainly inhabits the tropic and sub-tropic levels of the forest, generally preferring areas with dense vegetation, such as thickets, tangles, thorny underbrushes and wet or even waterlogged areas.

The ornate titi tends to sleep in vine tangles located on small branches of trees, generally preferring to be at least 15 m (49 ft) off of the ground. Like other members of the moloch group, the ornate titi is considered tolerant of seasonal flooding and disturbances within its habitat, and is commonly found living in areas of forest disturbed by humans, in particular thriving on highly disturbed habitats. However, due to the continuous expanding of human settlements and therefore declination of both the size and quality of the ornate titi's habitat, the presence of the species has become severely fragmented, with the current approximate area of habituated land around 20,000 km a decline of 30% in the last 24 years, and has been listed as Vulnerable by the IUCN since 1994 and is listed on Appendix II of CITES.

Decline in habitat has also led to a change in population, with a recorded population density of 5 individuals/km, and a general decreasing population trend.

=== Diet ===
The ornate titi is an omnivore, but its diet is mainly frugivorous, their diet consisting of 70% fruit, 26% leaves, and less than 1% insects, usually with a preference for fruit that is not ripe, or that comes from smaller trees, as they can more efficiently exploit the more concentrated supply. However, they will also eat small (Generally less than 2 cm long) insects, such as moths, butterflies, cocoons, spiders, and ants, and are able to catch flying insects out of the air.

Out of the leaves which make up more than quarter of their diet, the ornate titi tends to prefer small leaves and buds, and during the dry season, their diets will become a lot more vine and bamboo based.

=== Lifestyle ===
Due to their mainly herbivorous diet, the ornate titi spends a significant portion of the day sleeping. They usually spend around 60% of their time sleeping, which hugely differs from the white-tailed titi (P. discolor), which spends less than 25%.

The ornate titi is diurnal, rising early in the morning and remaining awake and active until sunrise, however this depends on the season, due to the change in availability in food, particularly fruit, which tends to only appear in abundance in the warmer months. In contrast, an ornate titi may stay in sleeping site for up to four hours after sunrise in colder months. Usually, a titi's daily activity lasts for around 11.5 hours, with feeding taking up around 2.7 hours.

Their day is typically split into two feeding sessions, one in the morning and one in the evening, with a resting session at around midday. The last few hours of the day are generally spent feeding on leaves.

=== Predators ===
The predominant and most important predators of all titis are raptors. Several species of raptor have been observed attacking a titi, including the Guianan crested eagle (Morphnus guianensis) and the ornate hawk-eagle (Spizaetus ornatus). Tufted capuchins (Cebus apella) have also been observed killing and consuming an ornate titi.

=== Reproduction and infant behaviour ===
The ornate titi is monogamous, and their upbringing is entirely paternal, only ever being passed to the mother to be fed. with the birth season being from December to March, with the smallest infants being born in December to January. The average gestation period for an ornate titi is 128 days (4.2) months, and there have been observations that, during lactation, female titis tend to increase the amount of protein in their diet (Primarily by eating more insects).

== Conservation ==
Some conservation efforts within Colombia have been made, since the species occurs in La Macarena National Park and Tinigua National Park, and although some populations have been observed in protected areas, guerilla activity makes it difficult to monitor.
