= Jacques Pucheran =

French zoologist

Jacques Pucheran (2 June 1817 – 13 January 1895) was a French zoologist born in Clairac. He was a grandnephew to physiologist Étienne Serres (1786-1868).

Pucheran accompanied the expedition on the Astrolabe between 1837 and 1840, under the command of Jules Dumont d'Urville, with fellow-naturalists Jacques Bernard Hombron and Honoré Jacquinot. On his return he contributed the ornithological section (with Jacquinot) of "Voyage au Pôle sud et dans l'Océanie sur les corvettes L'Astrolabe et La Zélée" (1841–1854).

Pucheran worked as a zoologist and naturalist at the Muséum national d'histoire naturelle. He was the author of many works in the fields of ornithology, mammalogy, anthropology, etc. With Florent Prévost and Isidore Geoffroy Saint-Hilaire, he published a catalog involving species of mammals and birds kept in the collections at the museum, titled "Muséum d'histoire naturelle de Paris. Catalogue méthodique," etc. (1851). He was a member of the Société d'Agen académique, and a chevalier in the Légion d'honneur and the Ordre de la Conception de Portugal.

He classified numerous zoological taxa, and the following are a few ornithological species that are named after him.

- Black-cheeked woodpecker, Melanerpes pucherani (Malherbe 1849)
- Crested guineafowl, Guttera pucherani (Hartlaub 1861)
- Red-billed ground-cuckoo, Neomorphus pucheranii (Deville 1851).
