= Hélder Queiroz =

Brazilian conservation biologist, primatologist, and fish behaviorist (born 1963)

- Born: Hélder Lima de Queiroz; 1963 (age 62–63); Pirapora, Minas Gerais, Brazil
- Education: University of Brasília (B.Sc., 1989); Federal University of Pará (M.Sc., 1994); St. Andrews University (Ph.D., 2000)
- Scientific career
- Fields: Conservation biology
- Institutions: Mamirauá Institute for Sustainable Development
- Thesis: Natural History and Conservation of Pirarucu, Arapaima gigas, at the Amazonian Várzea: Red Giants in Muddy Waters (2000)
- Doctoral advisor: Anne Magurran
- Other academic advisors: José Márcio Ayres

Hélder Lima de Queiroz (Portuguese pronunciation: [ˈɛwdeʁ kejˈɾɔ(j)z]) (born 1963) is a Brazilian conservation biologist, primatologist, and fish behaviorist.

He was the Director of the Instituto de Desenvolvimento Sustentável Mamirauá (MISD) in Amazonas state, dedicated to protecting the biodiversity of the Amazon flood forest and the well-being of those who live there, through community management of the environment.

Queiroz received his doctorate in 2000 from St. Andrews University, Scotland, in Environmental And Evolutionary Biology, with the thesis "Natural history and conservation of pirarucu, Arapaima gigas, at the Amazonian várzea: Red giants in muddy waters". His advisor was the population biologist Anne E. Magurran.

He has discovered and named a new species of capuchin monkey (Queiroz, 1992). He currently (2013) works on Amazon flooded forest ecology, ecology and behaviour of Amazonian vertebrates, and Indigenous hunting. He is a graduate faculty member in zoology at the Museu Paraense Emílio Goeldi, and animal sciences at Federal University of Pará State (UFPA), in Belém.

== Selected publications ==
- SOUSA, L. L.; QUEIROZ, H. L.; AYRES, J. M. 2006. The mottled-face tamarin, Sguinus inustus, in the Amanã Sustainable Development Reserve. Neotropical Primates, Vol. 12, 121-122.
- QUEIROZ, H. L. 1992. A new species of capuchin monkey, genus Cebus Erxleben, 1777 (Cebidae: Primates) from Eastern Brazilian Amazonia. Goeldiana, Zoologia Vol. 15, 1-13.
- QUEIROZ, H. L. 1994. Preguiças e Guaribas: Os Mamíferos Folívoros Arborícolas do Mamirauá. Brasília: Sociedade Civil Mamirauá & CNPq. 120 pp.
- QUEIROZ, H. L.; MAGURRAN, A. E. 2005. Safety in Numbers? Schoaling behaviour of the Amazonian red-bellied piranha. Biological Letters of the Royal Society, Vol. 1, n. 2, 155-157.
