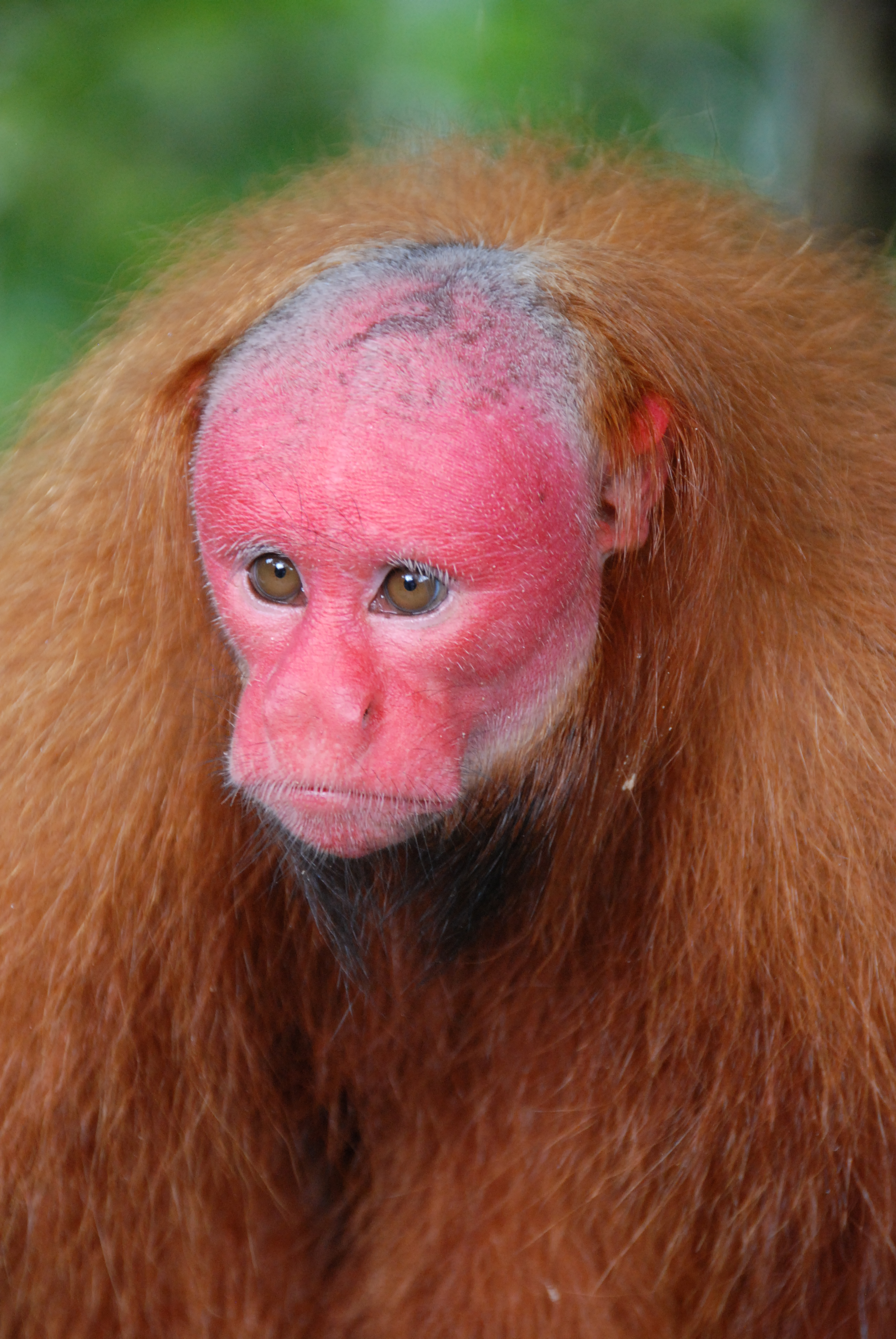
- In Iquitos, Peru

Conservation status
- Vulnerable (IUCN 3.1)

Scientific classification
- Kingdom: Animalia
- Phylum: Chordata
- Class: Mammalia
- Order: Primates
- Suborder: Haplorhini
- Infraorder: Simiiformes
- Family: Pitheciidae
- Genus: Cacajao
- Species: C. ucayalii

Binomial name
- Cacajao ucayalii (Thomas, 1928)

= Ucayali bald-headed uakari =

Species of monkey

The Ucayali bald-headed uakari (Cacajao ucayalii) is a species of New World monkey. It is native to Brazil and Peru.
