= Neblina uakari =

Conservation status
- Vulnerable (IUCN 3.1)
- CITES Appendix I

Scientific classification
- Kingdom: Animalia
- Phylum: Chordata
- Class: Mammalia
- Infraclass: Placentalia
- Order: Primates
- Family: Pitheciidae
- Genus: Cacajao
- Species: C. hosomi

Binomial name
- Cacajao hosomi Boubli et al., 2008
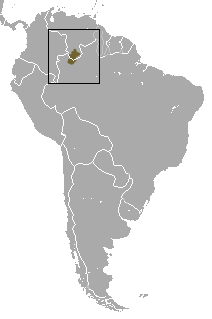
- species range

Synonyms
- Cacajao melanocephalus melanocephalus

Species of New World monkey

The Neblina uakari (Cacajao hosomi) or black-headed uakari, is a newly described species of monkey from the far northwest Brazilian Amazon and adjacent southern Venezuela. It was found by Jean-Phillipe Boubli of the University of Auckland and described together with the more easterly distributed Aracá uakari in 2008. Until then, the black-headed uakari (found to the west and south of the Neblina uakari) was the only species of mainly black uakari that was recognized.

The English name of the Neblina uakari refers to the Pico da Neblina, which marks the approximate center of its known distribution. Several years before it was realized it represented an undescribed species (and not "just" black-headed uakaris), it was studied in the Pico da Neblina National Park in Brazil. When combined with the adjacent Serranía de la Neblina National Park in Venezuela, a significant part of this uakaris distribution is within protected areas.

It has well coordinated travel established through constant calling, allowing a group to spread 200 to 300 meters.

Females produce one offspring, typically in March and April coinciding with the fruiting season.
