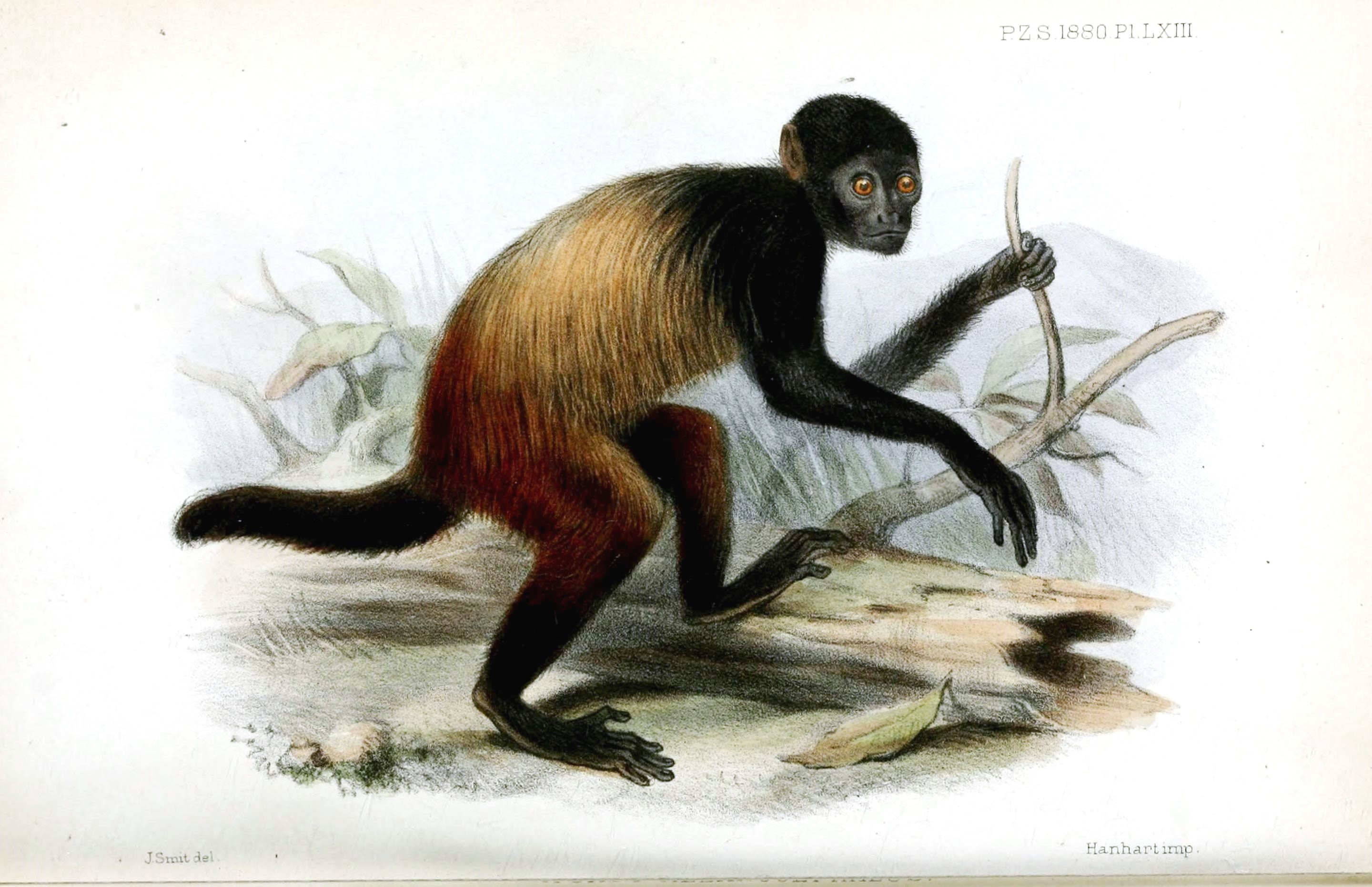
- C. m. ouakary

Conservation status
- Least Concern (IUCN 3.1)
- CITES Appendix I

Scientific classification
- Kingdom: Animalia
- Phylum: Chordata
- Class: Mammalia
- Order: Primates
- Suborder: Haplorhini
- Family: Pitheciidae
- Genus: Cacajao
- Species: C. melanocephalus

Binomial name
- Cacajao melanocephalus (Humboldt, 1812)
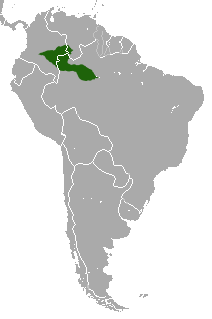
- species range

Synonyms
- Cacajao melanocephalus ouakary

= Golden-backed uakari =

Species of New World monkey

The golden-backed uakari (Cacajao melanocephalus) or black-headed uakari, is a New World primate from the family Pitheciidae. It lives in the Amazon rainforest, and is found in the countries of Brazil, Colombia, and Venezuela. It has black hair covering its body, except for a reddish abdomen, tail, and upper limbs, and a bald face. It has highly specialised teeth which allow it to eat seeds and fruits with hard shells.

== Taxonomy ==
The species Cacajao melanocephalus was previously named the black-headed uakari and two subspecies were thought to exist: Cacajao melanocephalus melanocephalus (black-backed uakari) and Cacajao melanocephalus ouakary (golden-backed uakari). However, in 2008 a new black uakari was discovered and the species group was reassessed using morphological and molecular analyses. Cacajao melanocephalus ouakary was found to be a junior synonym of Cacajao melanocephalus but its common name, golden-backed uakari, replaced the previous one, black-headed uakari. Cacajao melanocephalus melanocephalus was elevated to species status as Cacajao hosom (the Neblina uakari), and a new species was named Cacajao ayresi (Aracá uakari). A proposed an alternative taxonomy which recognizes the Aracá uakari as a subspecies of the golden-backed uakari, and also recognizes Cacajao ouakary as a separate species from C. melanocephalus, but this revision is not universally accepted.

== Description ==
The golden-backed uakari is characterized by a black haired head, black hairless facial skin, black lower limbs and hands, black soles on hands and feet, and a reddish hued flank, tail, and upper limbs. They are noted for having a particularly short and non-prehensile tail and highly specialized teeth.

Sexual dimorphism is present, with females being slightly smaller than the males, having a mass generally less than 3 kg (6.6 lb) compared to an overall species' mass ranging from 2.5 to 3.7 kg (5.5 to 8.2 lb).

== Distribution ==
It is native to north-western Brazil, south-eastern Colombia and south-western Venezuela, living in the Amazon rainforest, especially in the seasonally flooded forests called igapos. No boundaries have been identified between the habitats of the three subspecies. Uakaris are known to travel several kilometers with the changing season in pursuit of certain fruits. Black-headed uakaris have been sighted in varying habitats apart from the igapos, including terra firme, palm swamps, low open white sand forests, rain forests, and campinarana.

== Diet ==
These uakaris mainly feed on seeds and fruits, but will also eat leaves, pith and insects. They have large canines that allow them to feed on seeds from fruits with hard shells and incisors that are able to shatter the husk for access to the inner seeds. They are also known to consume fruits from many different species of trees. Overall, there is little competition with other primates for food, as most living in the same habitat do not devour hard fruits, however some competition with birds exist. Leaves are also consumed, especially when fruits are low during the dry season. Another dietary form observed is insectivory, peaking when fruit availability is low, through the consumption of fruit infested with insects or through the deliberate hunting of insects for protein. Uakaris have been seen raiding wasp nests for larvae and even eating the eggs of river turtles.

== Behavior ==
They typically live in groups of 5-40 individuals, but occasionally more than 100 may come together. Individuals within a subgroup exist in close proximity and interact frequently. The uakari are diurnal. They move around by walking and running on all fours and even climbing and galloping. Leaping is the main method of travel, allowing them to cover a distance of 10 meters in one leap. Swimming is done only when required, as when they accidentally fall into the water.

Newborn infants range from 25% to 67% of the mother's body length. After birth, the infants follow the mother for a year and a half, being carried on her back or front side.
