= José Márcio Ayres =

Brazilian primatologist and conservationist (1954–2003)

- José Márcio Ayres in 2002
- Born: José Márcio Corrêa Ayres; February 21, 1954; Belém, Brazil
- Died: March 7, 2003 (aged 49); New York City, United States
- Education: University of São Paulo; National Institute of Amazonian Research; Sidney Sussex College, Cambridge
- Known for: Amazon conservation
- Awards: WWF Gold Medal; Ordem Nacional do Mérito Científico; Rolex Awards for Enterprise
- Scientific career
- Fields: Conservation biology Primatology
- Workplaces: Mamirauá Institute; Museu Paraense Emílio Goeldi; Wildlife Conservation Society
- Thesis: Uakaris and Amazonian flooded forest (1986)
- Academic advisors: David Chivers; Paulo Vanzolini
- Notable students: Hélder Queiroz

José Márcio Corrêa Ayres (February 21, 1954 – March 7, 2003) was a Brazilian primatologist and conservationist who founded the Mamirauá Sustainable Development Reserve in 1996, followed by the Amanã Sustainable Development Reserve in 1998. The two reserves are located in the central region of the Brazilian state of Amazonas, and are joined to adjacent Jaú National Park to form a corridor spanning over 20,000 square miles (52,000 km^{2}) of protected rainforest.

Ayres devoted his life to the preservation of the unique biota and ecosystems of the Amazon, as well as to developing a method by which rural dwellers would benefit from the conservation of natural resources. He realized that the uakari monkeys he had been studying for his doctoral thesis would stand no chance of survival unless new community-based models of natural resource management were applied to the much exploited Amazon river basin.

Ayres's doctorate in primatology at Sidney Sussex College, Cambridge, in 1986 was for his thesis Uakaris and Amazonian flooded forest, the field work for which was undertaken on the upper Amazon River floodplain, near Tefé.

Ayres died of lung cancer in 2003 at the Mount Sinai Hospital in New York, United States.

== Selected publications ==
- Ayres, José Márcio (1993). As Matas de Várzea do Mamirauá (in Portuguese). CNPq: Sociedade Civil Mamirauá.
- Ayres, J.M. (1985). "On a new species of squirrel monkey, genus Saimiri, from Brazilian Amazonia (Primates, Cebidae)". Papéis Avulsos de Zoologia. 36: 147–164. doi:10.11606/0031-1049.1983.36.p147-164.
- Ayres, J.M. (1989). "Comparative feeding ecology of the Uakari and Bearded Saki, Cacajao and Chiropotes". Journal of Human Evolution. 18 (7): 697–716. doi:10.1016/0047-2484(89)90101-2.
- Ayres, J.M.; Clutton-Brock, T.H. (1992). "River Boundaries and Species Range Size in Amazonian Primates". The American Naturalist. 140 (3): 531–537. doi:10.1086/285427. PMID 19426056.
- Mittermeier, R.A.; Schwarz, M.; Ayres, J.M. (1992). "A new species of marmoset, genus Callithrix Erxleben, 1777 (Callitrichidae, Primates) from the Rio Maués region, state of Amazonas, central Brazilian Amazonia". Goeldiana Zoologia. 14: 1–17.
- Pimm, Stuart L.; Ayres, Márcio; Balmford, Andrew; et al. (2001). "Can We Defy Nature's End?" (PDF). Science. 293 (5538): 2207–8. doi:10.1126/science.1061626. PMID 11567124.

== External sources ==
- Mamirauá Institute for Sustainable Development
