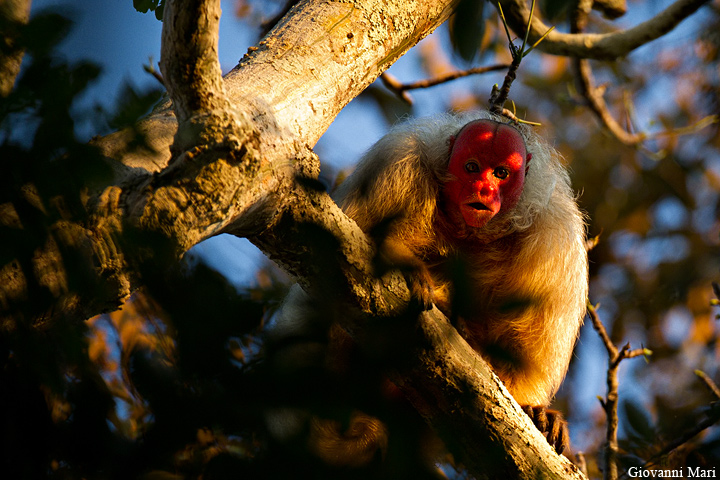
- White uakari (C. c. calvus) at the Solimões River, Brazil.

Conservation status
- Vulnerable (IUCN 3.1)
- CITES Appendix I

Scientific classification
- Kingdom: Animalia
- Phylum: Chordata
- Class: Mammalia
- Infraclass: Placentalia
- Order: Primates
- Family: Pitheciidae
- Genus: Cacajao
- Species: C. calvus

Binomial name
- Cacajao calvus (I. Geoffroy, 1847)
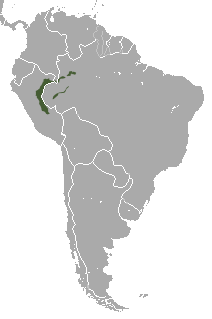
- species range

= Bald uakari =

Species of New World monkey

The bald uakari (Cacajao calvus) or bald-headed uakari is a small New World monkey characterized by a very short tail, a bright, crimson face, bald head, and long coat. The bald uakari is restricted to várzea forests and other wooded habitats near water in the western Amazon of Brazil and Peru.

== Taxonomy ==
There are four recognized subspecies of the bald uakari, each of which is considered vulnerable to extinction:

- White bald-headed uakari, Cacajao calvus calvus
- Ucayali bald-headed uakari, Cacajao calvus ucayalii
- Red bald-headed uakari, Cacajao calvus rubicundus
- Novaes' bald-headed uakari, Cacajao calvus novaesi

However, a literature review of all known occurrence records, followed by a molecular phylogenetic analysis, suggests that these subspecies should be upgraded to species, as well as adding a new species, Cacajao amuna sp. n. If this is accepted by the wider research community, it could have large implications for the conservation status of the five species, for example with C. novaesi and C. amuna having small ranges at particular risk from deforestation.

== Description ==
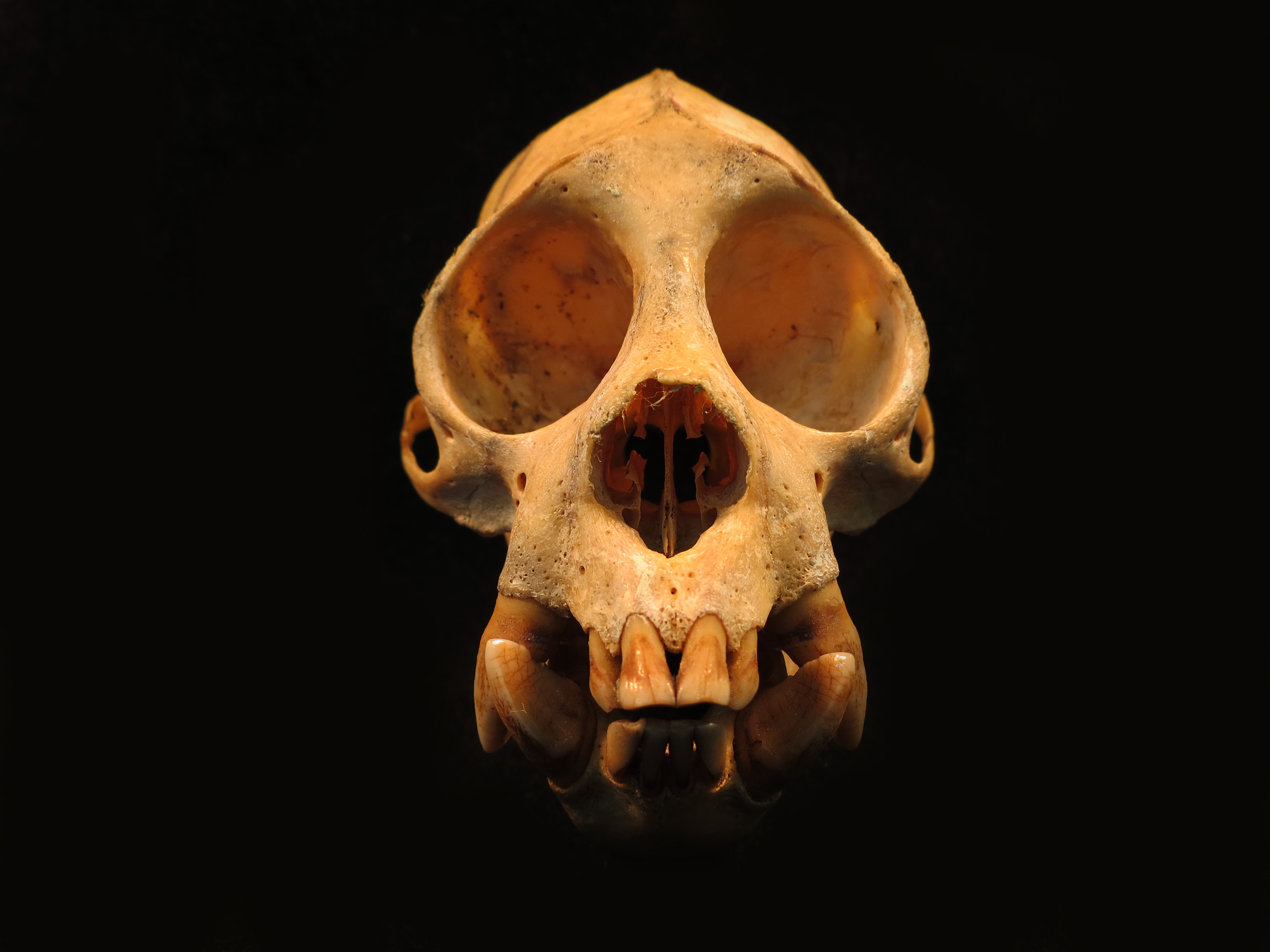
A skull of male red uakari (C. c. rubicundus) at Museum of Zoology of the University of São Paulo

The bald uakari weighs between 2.75 and 3.45 kg (6.1 and 7.6 lb), with head and body lengths average 45.6 cm (18.0 in) (male) and 44.0 cm (17.3 in) (female). In general, the bald uakari has a long, shaggy coat ranging from white in color to red and its head is bald. The tail is bob-like and rather short for a New World monkey (about 5.9 in (15 cm), at only half the length of the body and head combined. Its scarlet red face is due to the lack of skin pigments and plentiful capillaries that run under its facial tissue.

== Behaviour and ecology ==
The arboreal bald uakari prefers to reside in seasonally flooded forests in the area of the Amazon River Basin, in the countries of Peru and Brazil. It is important that the uakari is arboreal (lives in the tree tops) because of the flooding of the forests and the water rising to great heights during the rainy season. During the dry season, it returns to the ground to look for seeds and other food material. A study of the diet of the uakari found it to consist of 67% seeds, 18% fruit, 6% flowers, 5% animal prey, and buds. Its powerful lower jaw forms a pseudodental comb, which allows the uakari to open the hard surfaces of unripe fruits and eat the nuts that most other primates would not be able to open. It will also eat insects that happen to cross its path, however it does not specifically pursue this type of food.

The bald uakari can be found traveling up to 4.8 kilometers per day in multi-male/multi-female groups of 5 to 30 individuals, and even up to 100. It can be extrapolated from the general primate behavior of female philopatry that female uakaries are also philopatric. This means that males leave the natal group. The total size of the group's home range is between 500 and 600 hectares. This requires efficient territorial defense mechanisms. A few of these include specific vocalizations, wagging of the tail, and erection of the hair.

The bright red facial skin is a sign of good health and allows for the determination of a healthy mate. The breeding season is between October and May. Its gestation period is approximately six months. Both sexes have a sternal gland, which might be involved in olfactory communication, especially during mating, when the female encourages the male to mate by releasing an attractive scent. The bald uakari lives approximately 30 years and has been known to live over 30 years in captivity.

Due to the uakari's location, it is extremely common for these animals to contract malaria. Primates who have contracted the disease are noticeably paler and are not chosen as sexual partners as they do not have the desired natural immunity to malaria.

== Conservation ==
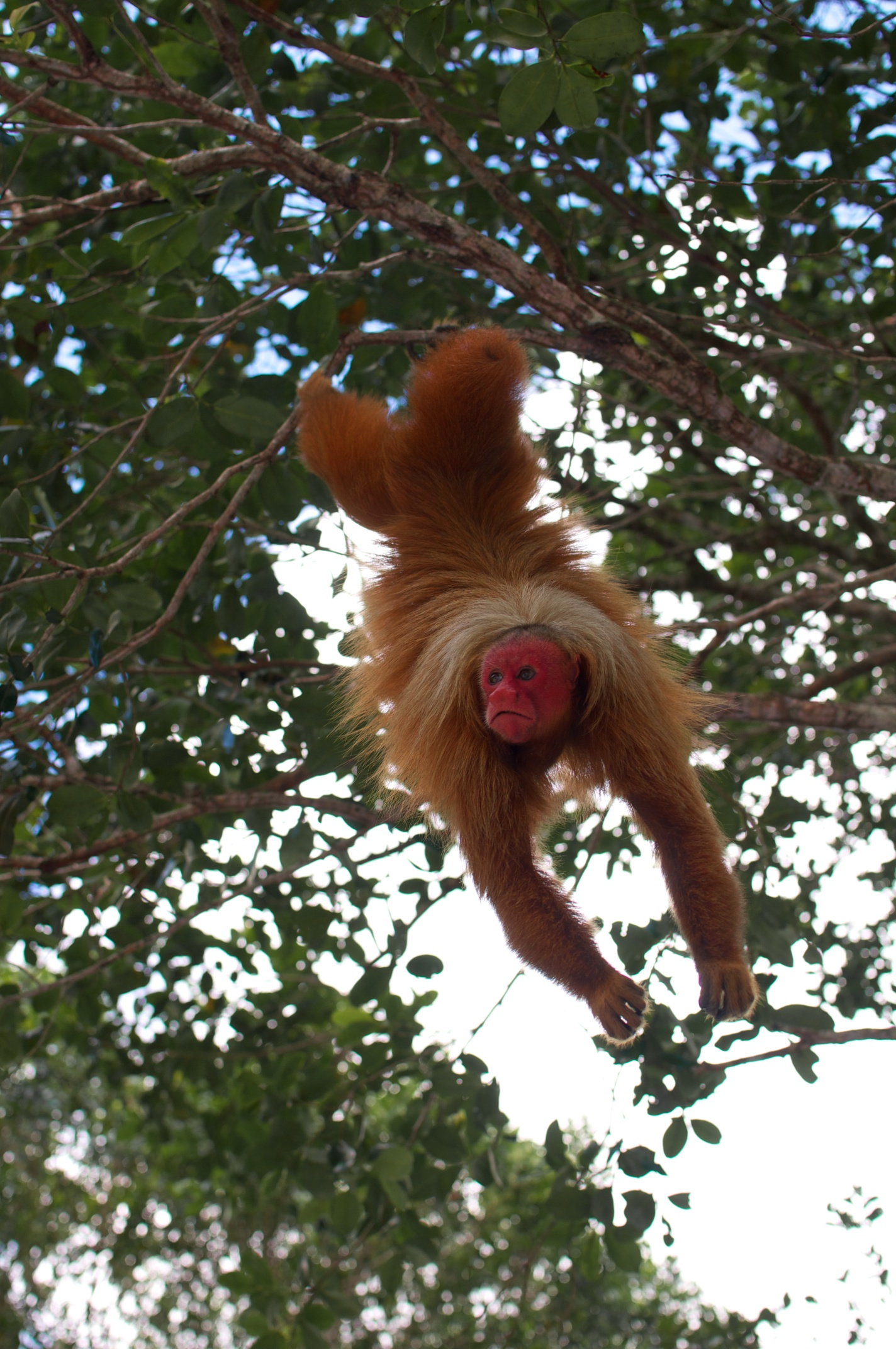
Novae's bald-headed uakari (C. c. novaesi) in the Brazilian Amazon.

The conservation status of this species was changed from near threatened to vulnerable in the 2008 IUCN Red List because the species has declined at least 30% over the past 30 years (three generations) due to hunting and habitat loss. This is considerably better than the 1994 assessment which found it to be endangered, followed by the 2003 assessment which found the species to be near threatened. Although the conservation status has improved, actual population numbers are on a decreasing trend. Since it only lives in white water flooded forests, it is very susceptible to human impact (i.e. land acquisition for agriculture and/or pastures).

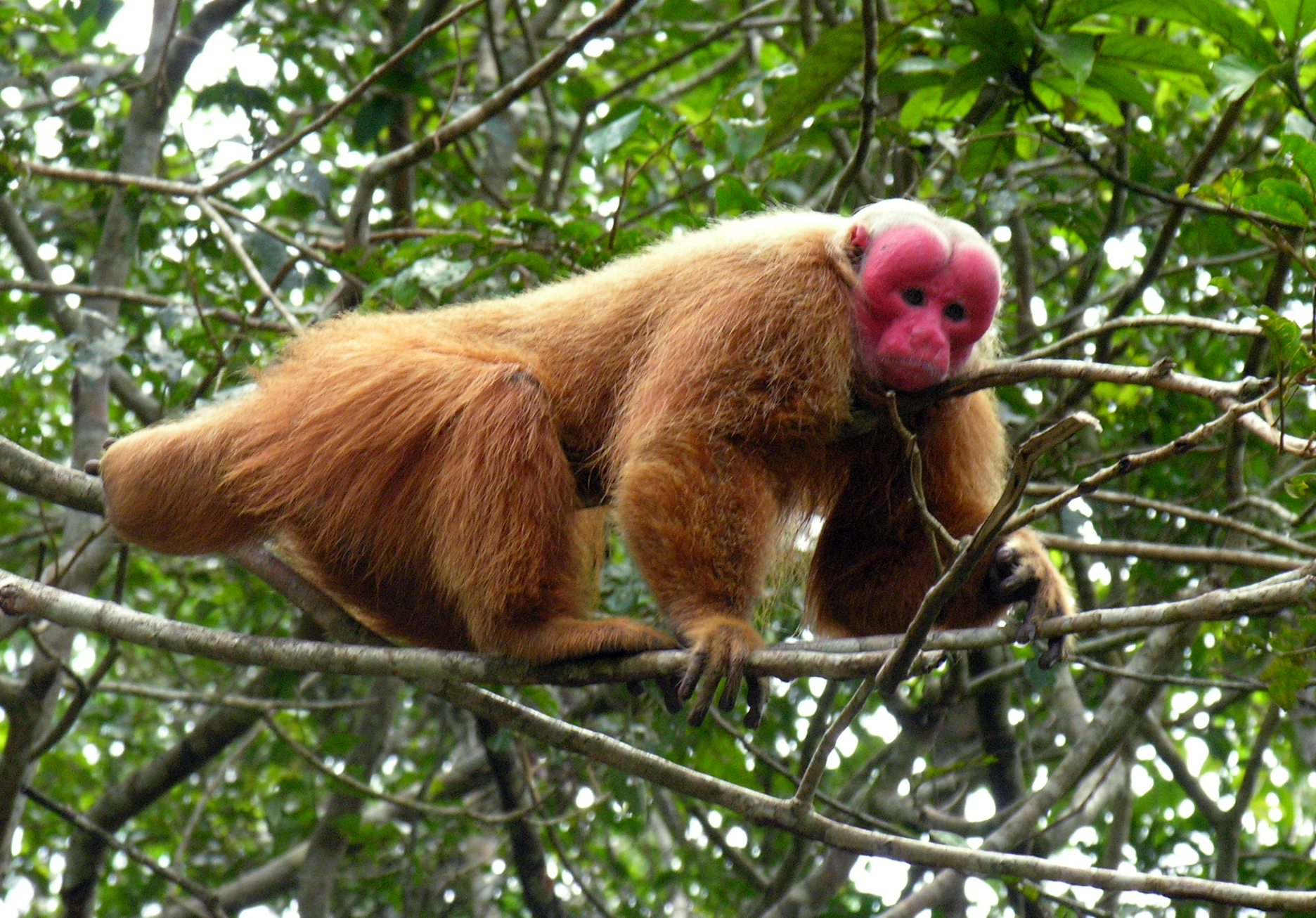
Red uakari (C. c. rubicundus) at the Taruma River, Brazil.

Forest loss and hunting are the two most prominent threats to the bald uakari. Between 1980 and 1990 it was found that an average of 15.4 million hectares of tropical forests were destroyed each year and the Neotropics are facing forest loss in areas such as the southern and eastern parts of the Amazonia. In 1997, the Amazon Basin experienced the highest rate of forest destruction of the remaining tropical rainforests worldwide. Logging of hardwoods is a major contributor to overall destruction as large-scale logging disrupts the continuity of forest canopies. Canopy disruption and forest loss directly affect uakaris because of their arboreal lifestyle and adaptations for seed food consumption. Additionally, Cacajao calvus populations are located so close to the Amazon River that there is a higher risk of human hunting from canoes and such to use the primates as a food source or bait.

=== Conservation organisations ===
In 1999, the Pilot Program to Conserve the Brazilian Rainforest, set forth by the World Bank, aimed to place a total of 350 million dollars from Germany, Britain, and other major industrialized communities into conservation programs for the Amazon. Conservation efforts have also been initiated by Wildlife Conservation Society representatives working in South America. The Amazon-Andes Conservation Program (AACP) was established in 2003 in order to protect a set of seven landscapes in the Amazon. These protected landscapes account for approximately three percent of the Amazon Basin. The Wildlife Conservation Society is planning on expanding to more landscapes in the near future. Along with the AACP, Brazil's national environment agency, the Instituto Brasileiro do Meio Ambiente e dos Recursos Naturais Renováveis (IBAMA) is gaining help from the army to patrol the Amazon for acts of illegal logging, mining, and deforestation.
