= Uakari =

- Bald uakari (Cacajao calvus)

Conservation status
- CITES Appendix I

Scientific classification
- Kingdom: Animalia
- Phylum: Chordata
- Class: Mammalia
- Order: Primates
- Family: Pitheciidae
- Subfamily: Pitheciinae
- Genus: Cacajao; Lesson, 1840

Type species
- Simia melanocephalus Humboldt, 1812

Species
- Cacajao amuna; Cacajao ayresi; Cacajao calvus; Cacajao hosomi; Cacajao melanocephalus; Cacajao novaesi; Cacajao rubicundus; Cacajao ucayalii

Genus of New World monkeys

Uakari (UK: /wəˈkɑːri/, US: /wɑː-/) is the common name for the New World monkeys from the genus Cacajao. Both the English and scientific names are believed to have originated from indigenous languages.

The uakaris are unusual among New World monkeys in that the tail length (15–18 cm) is substantially less than their head and body length (40–45 cm). Their bodies are covered with long, loose hair but their heads are bald. They have almost no subcutaneous fat, so their bald faces appear almost skull-like. Like their closest relatives the saki monkeys, they have projecting lower incisors. These monkeys have the most striking red facial skin of any primate. Females choose their mates based on how red the male's face is. Evidence suggests that the red facial coloration reflects the health of the primate.

The four species of uakari currently recognized are all found in the north-western Amazon basin. The bald uakari, remarkable for its brilliant scarlet complexion, is found north of the Amazon River, and south of the Japurá River in the Mamirauá Sustainable Development Reserve. The black-headed uakari is found north of the Amazon and south of the Rio Negro. The Neblina uakari is found north of the Rio Negro, west of the Rio Marauiá and east of the Casiquiare canal. The Aracá uakari is currently known only from the Rio Curuduri basin.

They have been observed both in small groups and in larger troops of up to 100. When traveling through the forest they move in the lower branches of the trees, though when foraging they also go up to the canopy. They mostly eat fruit, and unlike other Neotropical frugivores will consume a large amount of unripe fruit for which they have specialised dentition. They also eat flowers, seeds, invertebrates, buds and leaves.

Uakari are found in neotropical Amazon flooded or riparian forests, including Brazil, Colombia, Peru and Venezuela.

A phylogeographic reconstruction found that the concestor of living uakari dates to 1.7 million years ago, in the Solimões River, whence they spread and diversified following intermittent river rearrangements.

== Species ==
Per the ASM and the IUCN, there are eight species in this genus:

- Genus Cacajao
  - Bald uakari or red uakari species group
    - White bald-headed uakari, Cacajao calvus
    - Ucayali bald-headed uakari, Cacajao ucayalii
    - Red bald-headed uakari, Cacajao rubicundus
    - Novaes' bald-headed uakari, Cacajao novaesi
    - Kanamari white uakari, Cacajao amuna
  - Black-headed uakari species group
    - Golden-backed or black-headed uakari, Cacajao melanocephalus
    - Aracá uakari, Cacajao ayresi
    - Neblina uakari, Cacajao hosomi

In 2014 Ferrari et al. proposed an alternative taxonomy for the C. melanocephalus group which recognizes the Aracá uakari as a subspecies of the golden-backed uakari, and also recognized Cacajao ouakary as a separate species, whereas current consensus is that C. ouakary is a junior synonym of C. melanocephalus. This revision is not universally accepted.

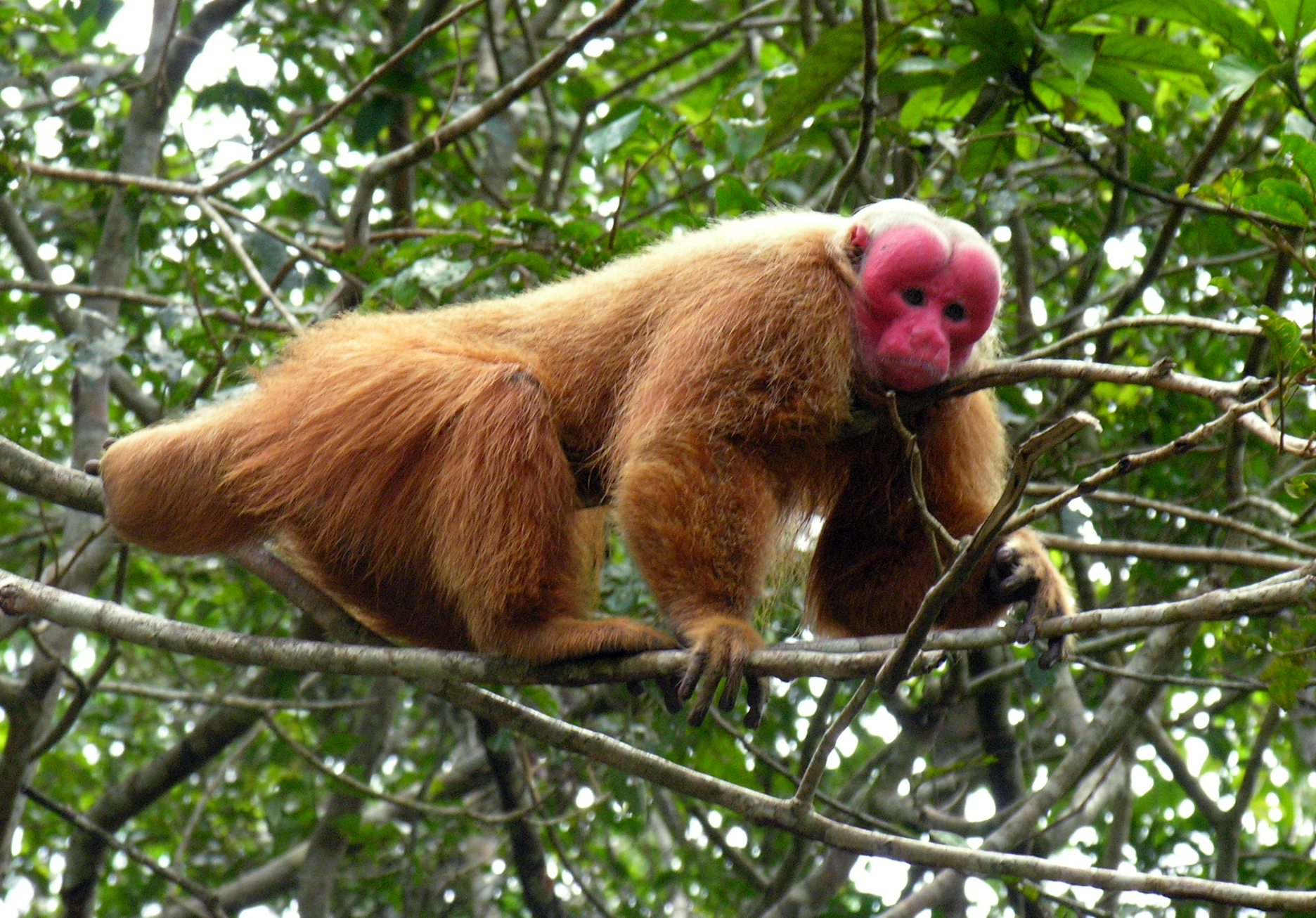
Male bald uakari
