= Émile Deville =

French physician, naturalist and taxidermist

Émile Deville (25 January 1824 – 8 January 1853) was a French medical doctor, naturalist and taxidermist.

Emile Deville, already an employee of Muséum national d'histoire naturelle, joined the 1843 expedition of Francis de Laporte de Castelnau (1810–1880) to South America with the doctor and botanist Hugh Algernon Weddell (1819–1877). He returned with many bird specimens, especially parrots, including two new species, Bonaparte's parakeet and the dusky-headed parakeet, which he described in 1851. He also described, with Isidore Geoffroy Saint-Hilaire, the white-tailed titi, and with de Castelnau, some crabs.

A number of species bear his name, such as the blaze-winged parakeet, Pyrrhura devillei and the striated antbird, Drymophila devillei.

The following are a few of the writings that are attributed to Deville:

- Description de quelques Mammifères et Oiseaux nouveaux de L'Amérique méridionale - Description of some new mammals and birds from South America.
- Note sur quatre espèces nouvelles d'oiseaux provenant de l'expédition de M. Castelnau - Note on four new species of birds from the Castelnau expedition.
- Considérations sur les avantages de la naturalisation en France de l'alpaca - Considerations on the advantages for naturalization of the alpaca in France.
