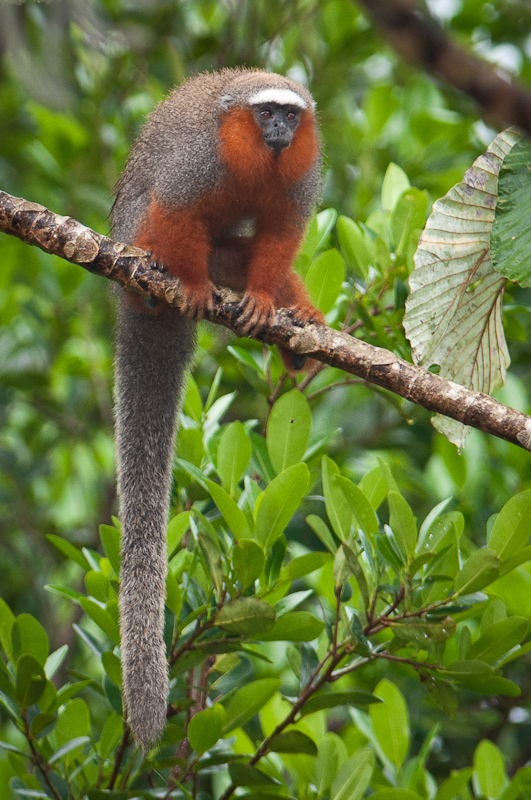

Conservation status
- Least Concern (IUCN 3.1)

Scientific classification
- Kingdom: Animalia
- Phylum: Chordata
- Class: Mammalia
- Infraclass: Placentalia
- Order: Primates
- Family: Pitheciidae
- Genus: Plecturocebus
- Species: P. discolor

Binomial name
- Plecturocebus discolor (I. Geoffroy and Deville, 1848)
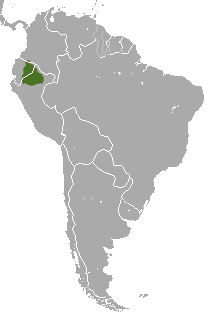
- White-tailed titi range

Synonyms
- leucometopa (Cabrera, 1900); napoleon Lönnberg, 1922; paenulatus Elliot, 1909; rutteri Thomas, 1923; subrufus Elliot, 1907

= White-tailed titi monkey =

White-tailed titi

Species of New World monkey

The white-tailed titi monkey (Plecturocebus discolor) is a species of titi monkey, a type of New World monkey, from South America. It is found in Colombia, Ecuador, and Peru. It was described in 1848 as Callithrix discolor.
