= Saint-Amand-Montrond =

- Subprefecture and commune
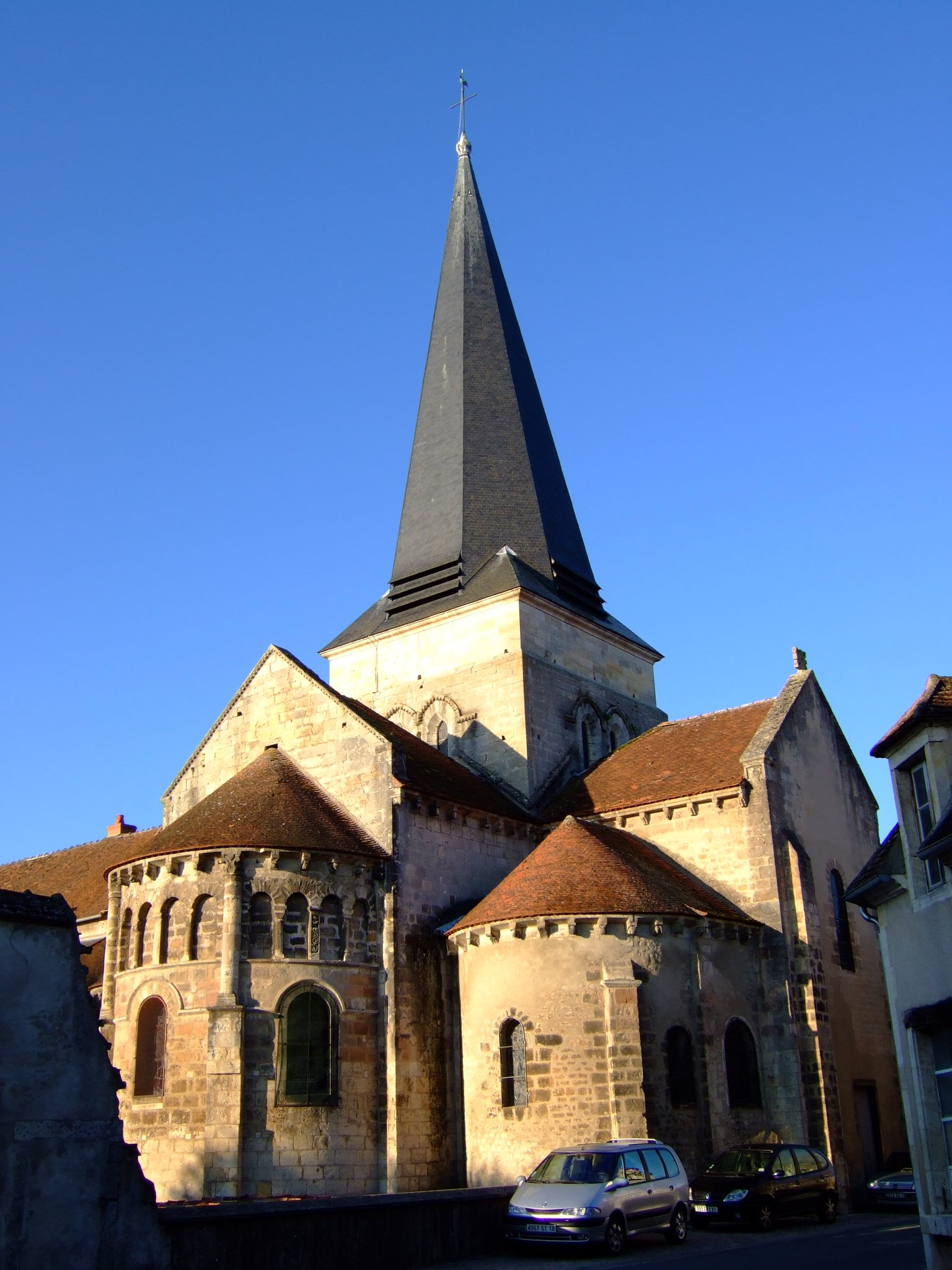
- The church of Saint-Amand, in Saint-Amand-Montrond

- Coat of arms
- Location of Saint-Amand-Montrond
- Location within France Location within Centre-Val de Loire
- Coordinates: 46°42′N 2°31′E
- Country: France
- Region: Centre-Val de Loire
- Department: Cher
- Arrondissement: Saint-Amand-Montrond
- Canton: Saint-Amand-Montrond
- Intercommunality: CC Cœur de France

Government
  - Mayor (2020–2026): Emmanuel Riotte
- Area^{1}: 20.17 km^{2} (7.79 sq mi)
- Elevation: 162 m (531 ft)
- Highest elevation: 312 m (1,024 ft)
- Lowest elevation: 148 m (486 ft)
- Population (2023): 9,899
  - Density: 490.8/km^{2} (1,271/sq mi)
- Time zone: UTC+01:00 (CET)
  - Summer (DST): UTC+02:00 (CEST)
- INSEE/Postal code: 18197 /18200
- ^{1} French Land Register data, which excludes lakes, ponds, glaciers > 1 km^{2} (0.386 sq mi or 247 acres) and river estuaries.

Saint-Amand-Montrond (French pronunciation: [sɛ̃.t‿amɑ̃ mɔ̃ʁɔ̃]) is a commune in the Cher department in the Centre-Val de Loire region of France and the historical province of Bourbonnais about 26 miles (42 km) southeast of Bourges, in the basin of the eastern banks of the Cher which separates it from the commune of Orval.

A small river, the Marmande, joins the Cher there, and the canal de Berry crosses the commune from southeast to southwest.

== Population ==
Historical population
Year	Pop.	±% p.a.
1968	11,495	—
1975	12,278	+0.95%
1982	12,451	+0.20%
1990	11,937	−0.53%
1999	11,447	−0.46%
2007	11,464	+0.02%
2012	10,518	−1.71%
2017	9,437	−2.15%
2023	9,899	+0.80%
Source: INSEE

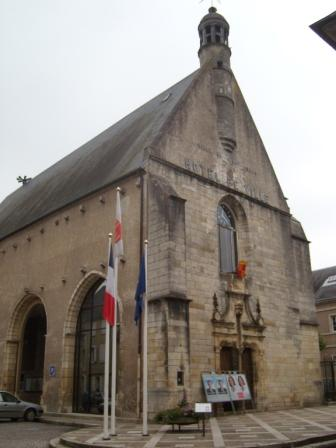
Town hall

== Sights ==
- Château de Montrond, a thirteenth-century castle

== Notable people ==
- Jean-Baptiste Lemire (1867–1945), composer.
- Louis Lecoin (1888–1971), pacifist and libertarian, was born in Saint-Amand-Montrond.
- Maurice Papon (1910–2007), mayor of Saint-Amand-Montrond (1971–1983) and collaborator during World War II.
- Serge Vinçon (1949–2007), college professor and politician was born here.
- Jean Godin des Odonais, cartographer and explorer, lived here.
- His Spanish wife, Isabel Godin des Odonais, died here.
- Julian Alaphilippe and his younger brother Bryan Alaphilippe, both cyclists, are from here.
- Érick Jacquin, French chef naturalized Brazilian, was born here.

== Tour de France ==
Cycling: The Tour de France has finished in the town three times. In 2001, it was the finishing line of a 61 km individual time trial from Montluçon. The stage was won by American Lance Armstrong of Discovery Channel Cycling Team. It featured again in the 2008 edition, again as a finish for an individual time trial. German Stefan Schumacher won the 53 km long stage from Cérilly. In 2013 stage 13 finished there from Tours and was won by British sprinter Mark Cavendish.

== Twin towns ==
- Nottuln, in Germany
- Otwock, Poland
- Riobamba, Ecuador

== Climate ==
Climate data for Saint-Amand-Montrond (1989–2010 normals, extremes 1989–2014)
Month	Jan	Feb	Mar	Apr	May	Jun	Jul	Aug	Sep	Oct	Nov	Dec	Year
Record high °C (°F)	20.2 (68.4)	25.1 (77.2)	27.8 (82.0)	29.9 (85.8)	33.8 (92.8)	39.2 (102.6)	39.2 (102.6)	41.0 (105.8)	35.4 (95.7)	29.2 (84.6)	24.1 (75.4)	19.2 (66.6)	41.0 (105.8)
Mean daily maximum °C (°F)	8.0 (46.4)	9.8 (49.6)	13.6 (56.5)	16.4 (61.5)	21.0 (69.8)	24.3 (75.7)	26.5 (79.7)	26.7 (80.1)	22.1 (71.8)	17.4 (63.3)	11.4 (52.5)	7.8 (46.0)	17.1 (62.8)
Daily mean °C (°F)	4.6 (40.3)	5.7 (42.3)	8.4 (47.1)	11.0 (51.8)	15.3 (59.5)	18.5 (65.3)	20.4 (68.7)	20.5 (68.9)	16.4 (61.5)	12.8 (55.0)	7.8 (46.0)	4.7 (40.5)	12.2 (54.0)
Mean daily minimum °C (°F)	1.2 (34.2)	1.6 (34.9)	3.3 (37.9)	5.5 (41.9)	9.6 (49.3)	12.7 (54.9)	14.4 (57.9)	14.3 (57.7)	10.7 (51.3)	8.2 (46.8)	4.1 (39.4)	1.5 (34.7)	7.3 (45.1)
Record low °C (°F)	−12.0 (10.4)	−13.3 (8.1)	−11.4 (11.5)	−3.5 (25.7)	−0.1 (31.8)	4.7 (40.5)	7.2 (45.0)	5.0 (41.0)	1.3 (34.3)	−6.3 (20.7)	−8.8 (16.2)	−11.7 (10.9)	−13.3 (8.1)
Average precipitation mm (inches)	56.8 (2.24)	51.0 (2.01)	48.4 (1.91)	69.9 (2.75)	81.6 (3.21)	70.4 (2.77)	68.9 (2.71)	62.5 (2.46)	70.5 (2.78)	64.5 (2.54)	70.7 (2.78)	66.0 (2.60)	781.2 (30.76)
Average precipitation days (≥ 1.0 mm)	11.0	9.8	8.9	11.2	10.6	9.4	8.6	8.2	8.2	10.9	12.1	11.0	119.7
Source: Meteociel

== See also ==
- Prix Alain-Fournier - literary prize awarded at the town's annual book fair
- Noirlac Abbey, in the neighboring commune of Bruère-Allichamps
