= Château de Montrond (Saint-Amand-Montrond) =

Coordinates: 46°43′22″N 2°29′44″E

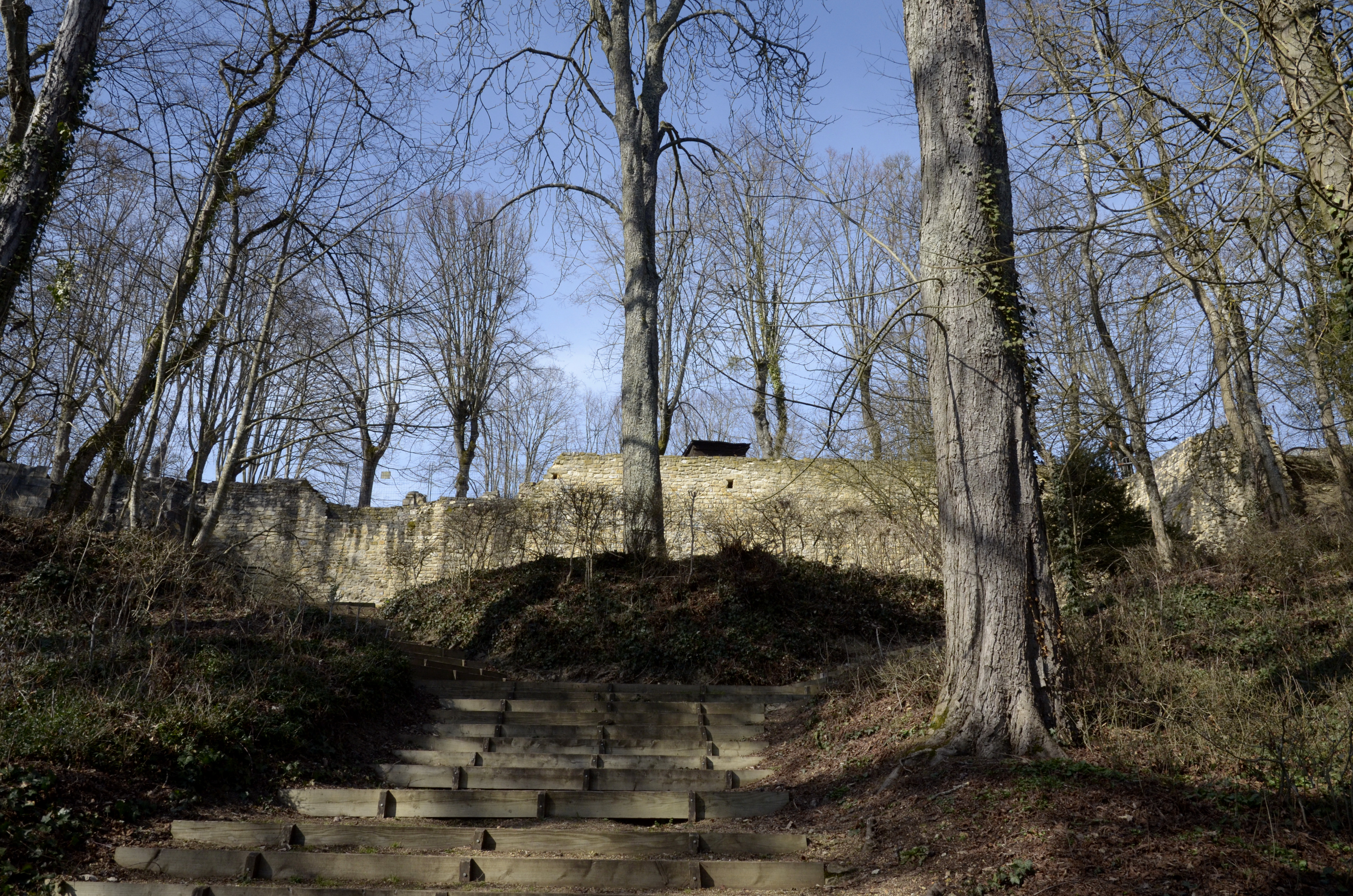

The Château de Montrond is a ruined castle in the commune of Saint-Amand-Montrond in the Cher département of France.

== History ==
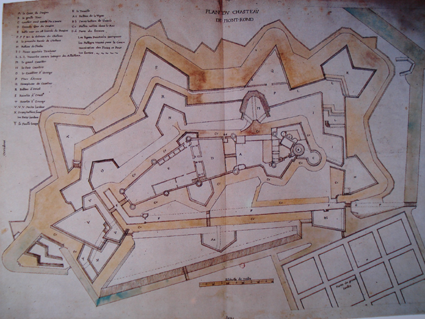
Plan of the fortress c. 1650

A fortress has existed on the site since the end of the 9th century, although the first documentary evidence is from 1225 when it was fortified by Renaud de Montfaucon. In 1361, during the Hundred Years' War, it was taken by the English. The English burned the castle at Orval in the early 15th century, causing the seigneur of Oval and Saint-Amand to move to the better protected site of Montrond. During the 15th and the early 16th centuries, extensive construction work was carried out, including a chapel for Isabeau de la Tour du Pin at the end of the 15th century.

The Duke of Sully took ownership of the dilapidated castle in 1606 and embarked on a programme of improvements which included remodelling the residence, strengthening the fortifications, digging moats and creating a garden. Between 1621 and 1652, the architect Jean Sarrazin completed fortifications for Henri II de Condé and his son Louis II le Grand Condé.

The castle was besieged for eleven months to September 1652; twenty starving survivors surrendered with honour. =Louis XIV ordered the immediate demolition of the castle but a lack of gunpowder meant that only a few bastions were damaged.

From 1736, the castle was progressively demolished and used as a quarry, eventually being transformed into a public garden in 1834.

The Château de Montrond is the property of the commune. It has been classified as a monument historique since 1942 by the French Ministry of Culture.

== See also ==
- List of castles in France
