= La Groutte =

- Commune
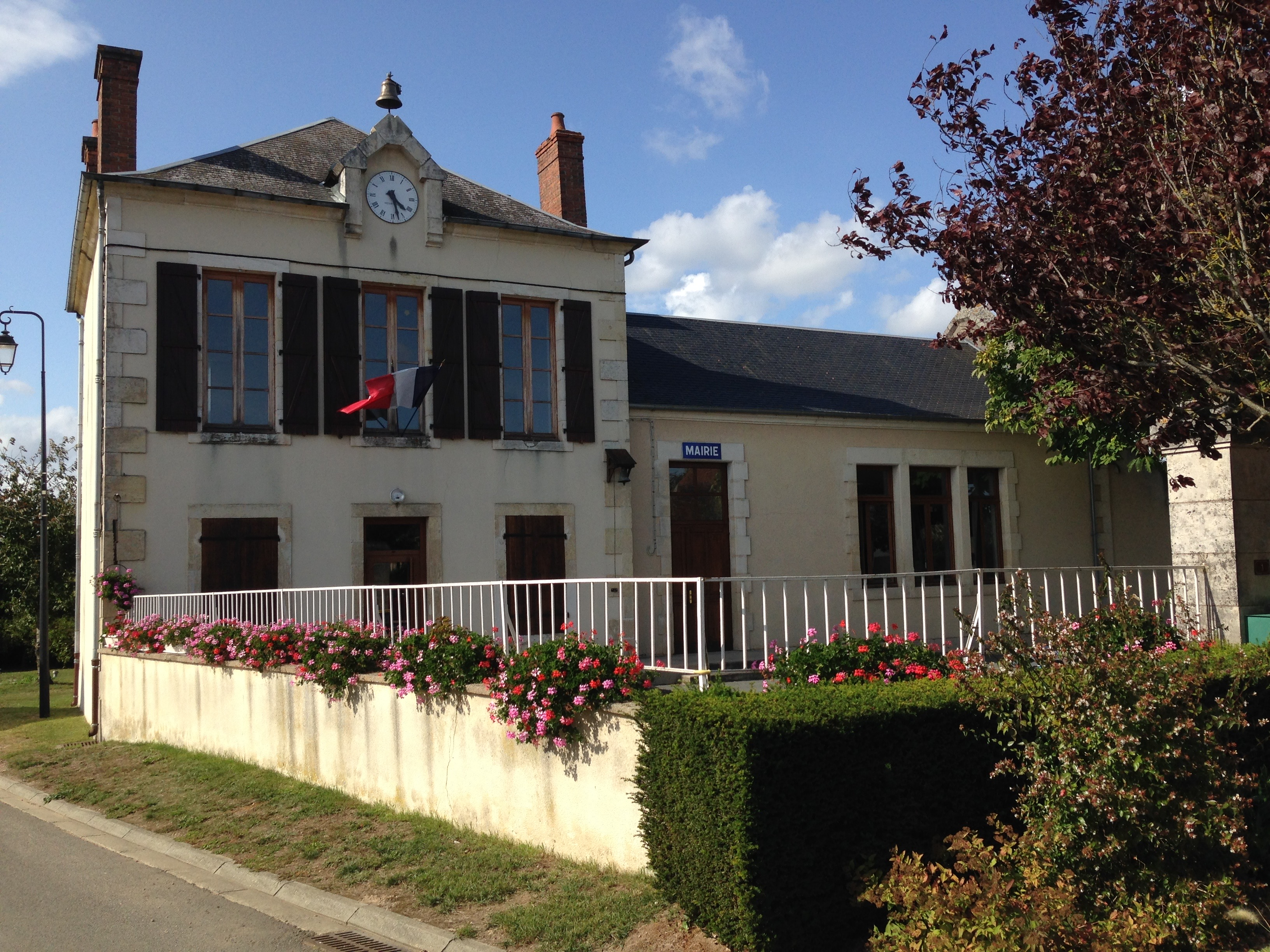
- Town hall
- Location of La Groutte
- Location within France Location within Centre-Val de Loire
- Coordinates: 46°41′14″N 2°30′41″E
- Country: France
- Region: Centre-Val de Loire
- Department: Cher
- Arrondissement: Saint-Amand-Montrond
- Canton: Saint-Amand-Montrond
- Intercommunality: Cœur de France

Government
  - Mayor (2020–2026): Philippe Perrichon
- Area^{1}: 2.92 km^{2} (1.13 sq mi)
- Elevation: 160 m (520 ft)
- Highest elevation: 208 m (682 ft)
- Lowest elevation: 154 m (505 ft)
- Population (2023): 115
  - Density: 39.4/km^{2} (102/sq mi)
- Time zone: UTC+01:00 (CET)
  - Summer (DST): UTC+02:00 (CEST)
- INSEE/Postal code: 18107 /18200
- ^{1} French Land Register data, which excludes lakes, ponds, glaciers > 1 km^{2} (0.386 sq mi or 247 acres) and river estuaries.

La Groutte (French pronunciation: [la ɡʁut]) is a commune in the Cher department in the Centre-Val de Loire region of France.

== Geography ==
A small farming village situated by the banks of the Cher, some 25 miles (40 km) south of Bourges, at the junction of the D139 and the D97 roads.

== Population ==
Historical population
Year	Pop.	±% p.a.
1968	137	—
1975	97	−4.81%
1982	89	−1.22%
1990	104	+1.97%
1999	103	−0.11%
2007	120	+1.93%
2012	129	+1.46%
2017	127	−0.31%
2023	115	−1.64%
Source: INSEE

== Sights ==
- The Gallo-Roman archaeological site.
- The restored limekilns.

== See also ==
- Communes of the Cher department
