= Farges-Allichamps =

- Commune
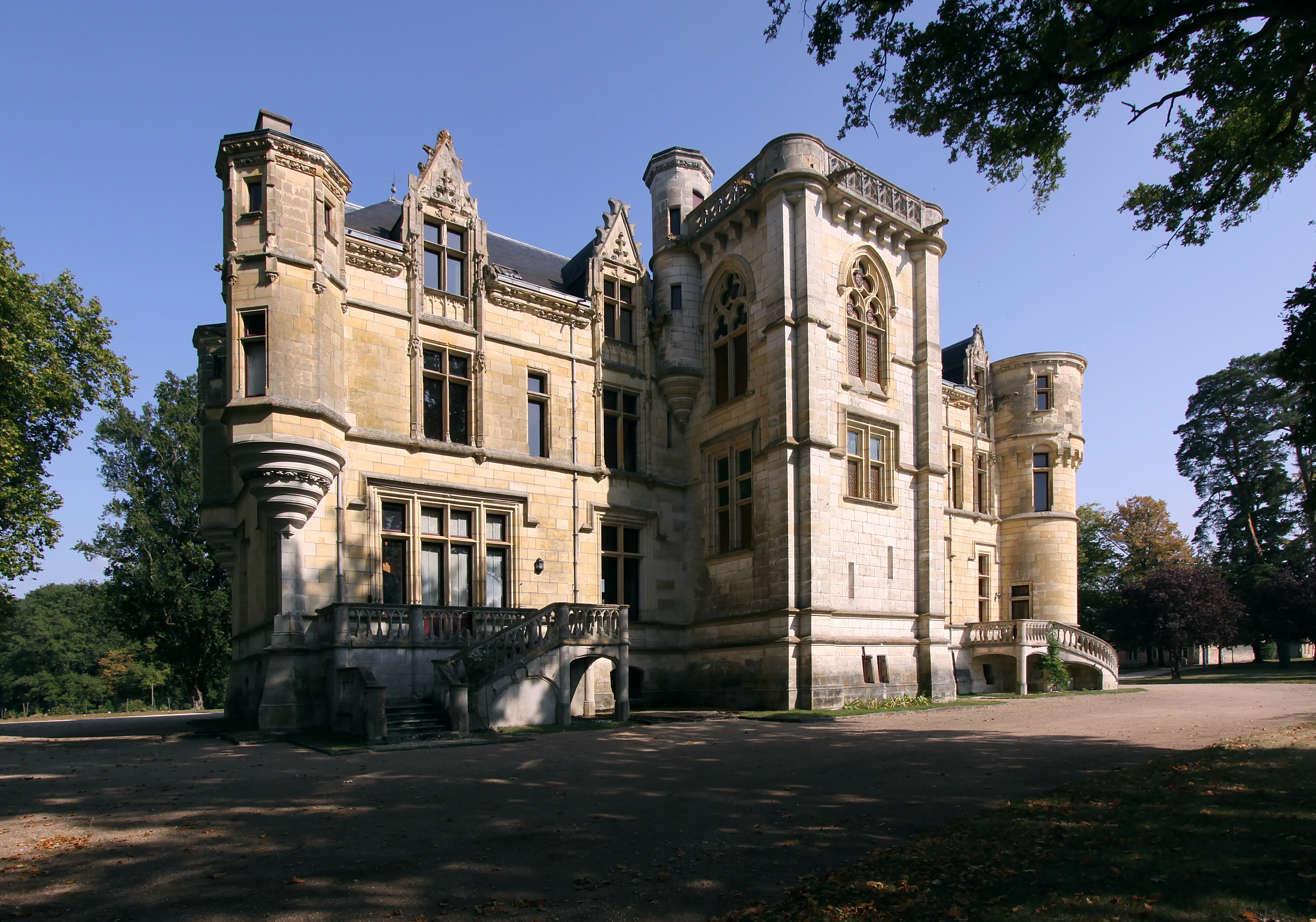
- Chateau of La Brosse
- Location of Farges-Allichamps
- Location within France Location within Centre-Val de Loire
- Coordinates: 46°45′34″N 2°24′04″E
- Country: France
- Region: Centre-Val de Loire
- Department: Cher
- Arrondissement: Saint-Amand-Montrond
- Canton: Saint-Amand-Montrond
- Intercommunality: Cœur de France

Government
  - Mayor (2020–2026): Edith Michelic
- Area^{1}: 8.3 km^{2} (3.2 sq mi)
- Highest elevation: 222 m (728 ft)
- Lowest elevation: 142 m (466 ft)
- Population (2023): 256
  - Density: 31/km^{2} (80/sq mi)
- Time zone: UTC+01:00 (CET)
  - Summer (DST): UTC+02:00 (CEST)
- INSEE/Postal code: 18091 /18200
- ^{1} French Land Register data, which excludes lakes, ponds, glaciers > 1 km^{2} (0.386 sq mi or 247 acres) and river estuaries.

Farges-Allichamps (French pronunciation: [faʁʒ aliʃɑ̃]) is a commune in the Cher department in the Centre-Val de Loire region of France.

== Geography ==
A farming village on the banks of the Cher 21 miles (34 km) south of Bourges at the junction of the D142 and the D92 roads. The A71 autoroute runs through the centre of the commune’s territory. The village is one of six with a claim to be the geographic centre of France.

== Population ==
Historical population
Year	Pop.	±% p.a.
1968	245	—
1975	248	+0.17%
1982	204	−2.75%
1990	246	+2.37%
1999	214	−1.54%
2007	214	+0.00%
2012	229	+1.36%
2017	241	+1.03%
2023	256	+1.01%
Source: INSEE

== Sights ==
- The twelfth-century church of St. Jean.
- The feudal castle de La Commanderie.
- The chateau of La Brosse, dating from the thirteenth century.

== See also ==
- Communes of the Cher department
