= Drevant =

- Commune
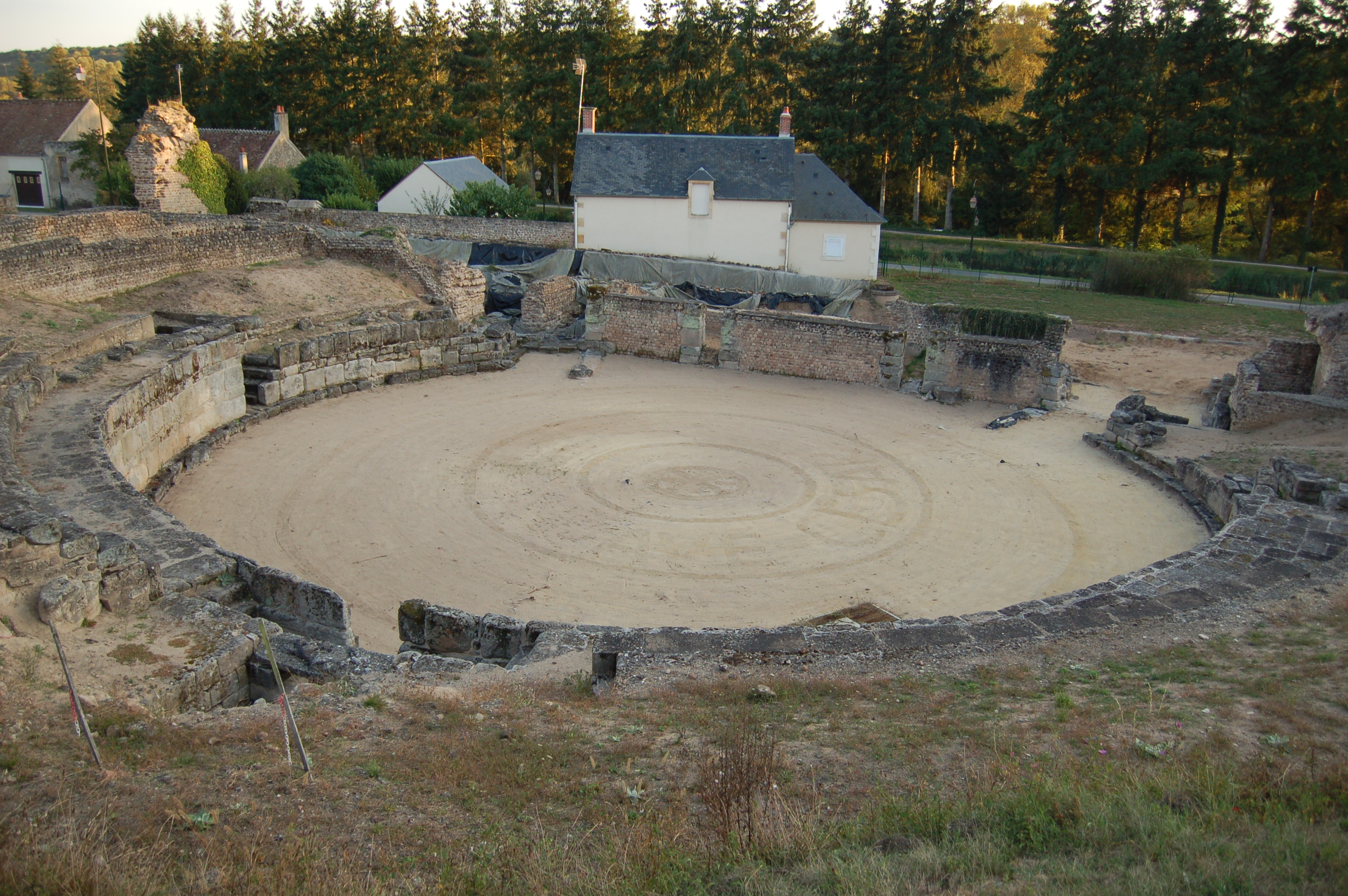
- Roman amphitheatre
- Location of Drevant
- Location within France Location within Centre-Val de Loire
- Coordinates: 46°41′39″N 2°31′33″E
- Country: France
- Region: Centre-Val de Loire
- Department: Cher
- Arrondissement: Saint-Amand-Montrond
- Canton: Saint-Amand-Montrond
- Intercommunality: Cœur de France

Government
  - Mayor (2020–2026): Patrick Bigot
- Area^{1}: 4.84 km^{2} (1.87 sq mi)
- Elevation: 168 m (551 ft)
- Highest elevation: 250 m (820 ft)
- Lowest elevation: 153 m (502 ft)
- Population (2023): 555
  - Density: 115/km^{2} (297/sq mi)
- Time zone: UTC+01:00 (CET)
  - Summer (DST): UTC+02:00 (CEST)
- INSEE/Postal code: 18086 /18200
- ^{1} French Land Register data, which excludes lakes, ponds, glaciers > 1 km^{2} (0.386 sq mi or 247 acres) and river estuaries.

Drevant (French pronunciation: [dʁəvɑ̃]) is a commune in the Cher department in the Centre-Val de Loire region of France.

== Geography ==
A farming village situated by the banks of the river Cher some 26 miles (42 km) south of Bourges at the junction of the D97 with the D141 and D2144 roads.

== Population ==
Historical population
Year	Pop.	±% p.a.
1968	283	—
1975	355	+3.29%
1982	486	+4.59%
1990	533	+1.16%
1999	610	+1.51%
2007	599	−0.23%
2012	566	−1.13%
2017	543	−0.83%
2023	555	+0.36%
Source: INSEE

== Sights ==
- The church of St. Pierre, dating from the twelfth century.
- The chapel of the eleventh-century priory.
- Considerable Gallo-Roman remains, including an amphitheatre, baths, villas and an aqueduct.

== See also ==
- Communes of the Cher department
