= Bouzais =

- Commune
- Location of Bouzais
- Location within France Location within Centre-Val de Loire
- Coordinates: 46°42′21″N 2°28′32″E
- Country: France
- Region: Centre-Val de Loire
- Department: Cher
- Arrondissement: Saint-Amand-Montrond
- Canton: Saint-Amand-Montrond
- Intercommunality: Cœur de France

Government
  - Mayor (2020–2026): Olivier Parillaud
- Area^{1}: 3.35 km^{2} (1.29 sq mi)
- Elevation: 160 m (520 ft)
- Highest elevation: 202 m (663 ft)
- Lowest elevation: 150 m (490 ft)
- Population (2023): 273
  - Density: 81.5/km^{2} (211/sq mi)
- Time zone: UTC+01:00 (CET)
  - Summer (DST): UTC+02:00 (CEST)
- INSEE/Postal code: 18034 /18200
- ^{1} French Land Register data, which excludes lakes, ponds, glaciers > 1 km^{2} (0.386 sq mi or 247 acres) and river estuaries.

Bouzais (French pronunciation: [buzɛ]) is a commune in the Cher department in the Centre-Val de Loire region of France, about 30 miles (48 km) south of Bourges.

== Population ==
Historical population
| Year | Pop. | ±% p.a. |
|---|---|---|
| 1968 | 187 | — |
| 1975 | 189 | +0.15% |
| 1982 | 227 | +2.65% |
| 1990 | 242 | +0.80% |
| 1999 | 254 | +0.54% |
| 2007 | 266 | +0.58% |
| 2012 | 324 | +4.02% |
| 2017 | 313 | −0.69% |
| 2023 | 273 | −2.25% |
Source: INSEE

== See also ==
- Communes of the Cher department
