= Nozières, Cher =

Nozières
- Commune
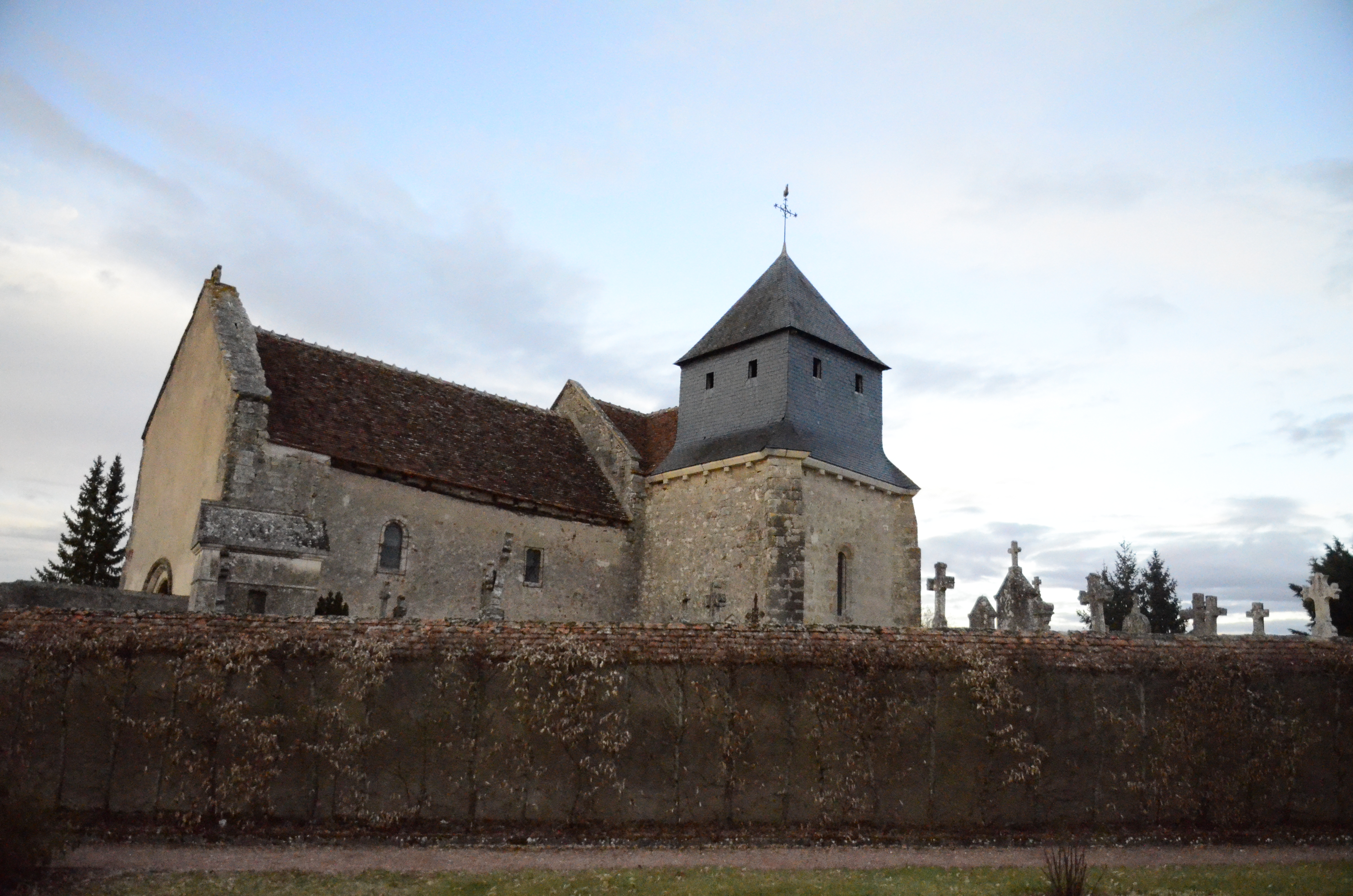
- The church of Saint-Paxent, in Nozières
- Location of Nozières
- Location within France Location within Centre-Val de Loire
- Coordinates: 46°43′55″N 2°26′06″E
- Country: France
- Region: Centre-Val de Loire
- Department: Cher
- Arrondissement: Saint-Amand-Montrond
- Canton: Saint-Amand-Montrond
- Intercommunality: Cœur de France

Government
  - Mayor (2020–2026): Franck Daumin
- Area^{1}: 10.35 km^{2} (4.00 sq mi)
- Elevation: 225 m (738 ft)
- Highest elevation: 224 m (735 ft)
- Lowest elevation: 144 m (472 ft)
- Population (2023): 235
  - Density: 22.7/km^{2} (58.8/sq mi)
- Time zone: UTC+01:00 (CET)
  - Summer (DST): UTC+02:00 (CEST)
- INSEE/Postal code: 18169 /18200
- ^{1} French Land Register data, which excludes lakes, ponds, glaciers > 1 km^{2} (0.386 sq mi or 247 acres) and river estuaries.

Nozières (French pronunciation: [nozjɛʁ]) is a commune in the Cher department in the Centre-Val de Loire region of France.

== Geography ==
A farming area comprising a village and several hamlets situated by the banks of the river Cher, some 24 miles (39 km) south of Bourges, at the junction of the D142 with the D925 roads. The A71 autoroute runs through the centre of the commune’s territory.

== Population ==
Historical population
Year	Pop.	±% p.a.
1968	189	—
1975	151	−3.16%
1982	154	+0.28%
1990	228	+5.03%
1999	231	+0.15%
2007	230	−0.05%
2012	231	+0.09%
2017	215	−1.43%
2023	235	+1.49%
Source: INSEE

== Sights ==
- The church of St. Paxent, dating from the eleventh century.
- A sixteenth-century manorhouse.

== See also ==
- Communes of the Cher department
