= Marçais =

- Commune
- Location of Marçais
- Location within France Location within Centre-Val de Loire
- Coordinates: 46°41′52″N 2°22′16″E
- Country: France
- Region: Centre-Val de Loire
- Department: Cher
- Arrondissement: Saint-Amand-Montrond
- Canton: Saint-Amand-Montrond
- Intercommunality: Cœur de France

Government
  - Mayor (2020–2026): Michelle Rivet
- Area^{1}: 29.03 km^{2} (11.21 sq mi)
- Elevation: 202 m (663 ft)
- Highest elevation: 241 m (791 ft)
- Lowest elevation: 177 m (581 ft)
- Population (2023): 308
  - Density: 10.6/km^{2} (27.5/sq mi)
- Time zone: UTC+01:00 (CET)
  - Summer (DST): UTC+02:00 (CEST)
- INSEE/Postal code: 18136 /18170
- ^{1} French Land Register data, which excludes lakes, ponds, glaciers > 1 km^{2} (0.386 sq mi or 247 acres) and river estuaries.

Marçais (French pronunciation: [maʁsɛ]) is a commune in the Cher department in the Centre-Val de Loire region of France.

== Geography ==
A farming area comprising the village and several hamlets, situated by the banks of the river Arnon some 28 miles (45 km) south of Bourges, at the junction of the D70, D112 and the D38 roads.

== Population ==
Historical population
| Year | Pop. | ±% p.a. |
|---|---|---|
| 1968 | 484 | — |
| 1975 | 424 | −1.87% |
| 1982 | 372 | −1.85% |
| 1990 | 371 | −0.03% |
| 1999 | 324 | −1.49% |
| 2007 | 299 | −1.00% |
| 2012 | 323 | +1.56% |
| 2017 | 282 | −2.68% |
| 2023 | 308 | +1.48% |
Source: INSEE

== Sights ==
- The church of St. Maurice, dating from the twelfth century.
- The fifteenth-century chateau of la Mothe.

== See also ==
- Communes of the Cher department
