= La Celle, Cher =

Commune in Centre-Val de Loire region, France

La Celle
- Commune
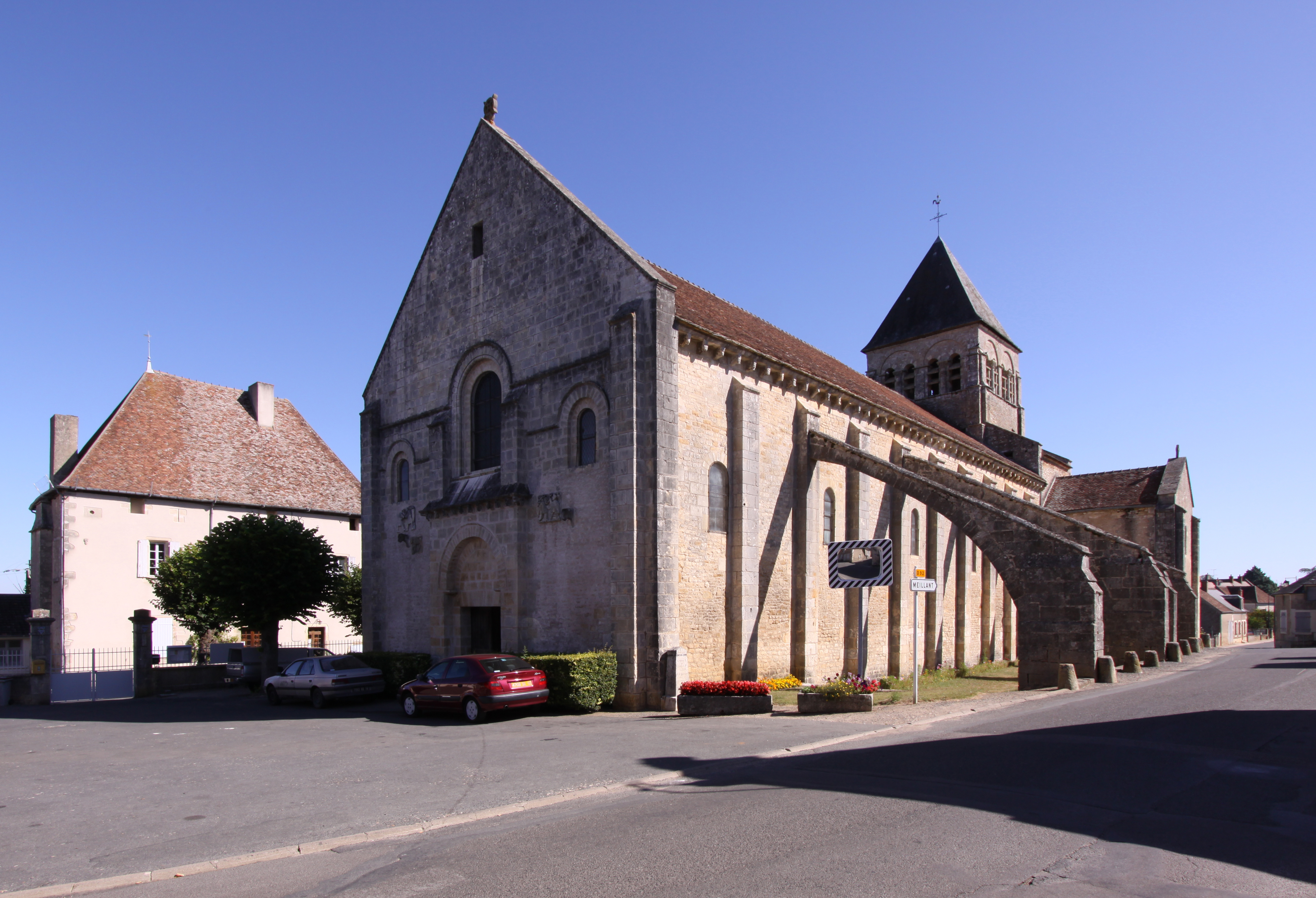
- The church of Saint-Blaise

- Coat of arms
- Location of La Celle
- Location within France Location within Centre-Val de Loire
- Coordinates: 46°46′11″N 2°26′50″E
- Country: France
- Region: Centre-Val de Loire
- Department: Cher
- Arrondissement: Saint-Amand-Montrond
- Canton: Saint-Amand-Montrond
- Intercommunality: Cœur de France

Government
  - Mayor (2020–2026): Philippe Auzon
- Area^{1}: 12.8 km^{2} (4.9 sq mi)
- Elevation: 125 m (410 ft)
- Highest elevation: 247 m (810 ft)
- Lowest elevation: 149 m (489 ft)
- Population (2023): 326
  - Density: 25.5/km^{2} (66.0/sq mi)
- Time zone: UTC+01:00 (CET)
  - Summer (DST): UTC+02:00 (CEST)
- INSEE/Postal code: 18042 /18200
- ^{1} French Land Register data, which excludes lakes, ponds, glaciers > 1 km^{2} (0.386 sq mi or 247 acres) and river estuaries.

La Celle (French pronunciation: [la sɛl]) is a commune in the Cher department in the Centre-Val de Loire region of France.

== Geography ==
An area of forestry and farming comprising the village and two hamlets situated in the valley of the Cher, some 23 miles (37 km) south of Bourges near the junction of the D2144 and the D92 roads.

== Population ==
Historical population
Year	Pop.	±% p.a.
1968	342	—
1975	264	−3.63%
1982	264	+0.00%
1990	291	+1.22%
1999	328	+1.34%
2007	360	+1.17%
2012	344	−0.91%
2017	348	+0.23%
2023	326	−1.08%
Source: INSEE

== Sights ==
- The church of St. Blaise, dating from the twelfth century.
- The fifteenth century chapel of St. Sylvain.

== See also ==
- Communes of the Cher department
