= Colombiers, Cher =

Colombiers
- Commune
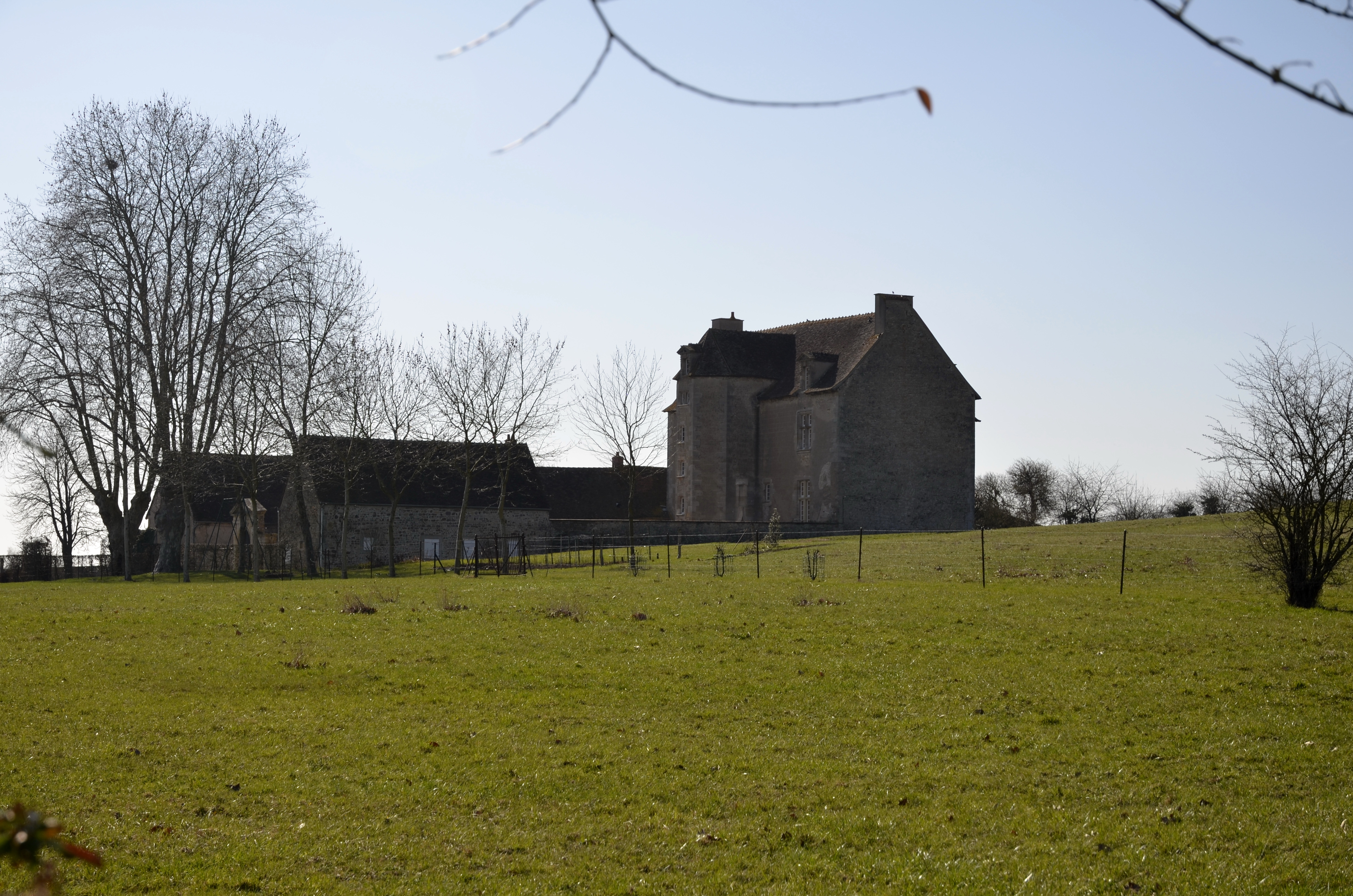
- Chateau of La Salle
- Location of Colombiers
- Location within France Location within Centre-Val de Loire
- Coordinates: 46°42′06″N 2°32′27″E
- Country: France
- Region: Centre-Val de Loire
- Department: Cher
- Arrondissement: Saint-Amand-Montrond
- Canton: Saint-Amand-Montrond
- Intercommunality: Cœur de France

Government
  - Mayor (2020–2026): Daniel Bone
- Area^{1}: 9.51 km^{2} (3.67 sq mi)
- Elevation: 170 m (560 ft)
- Highest elevation: 210 m (690 ft)
- Lowest elevation: 153 m (502 ft)
- Population (2023): 409
  - Density: 43.0/km^{2} (111/sq mi)
- Time zone: UTC+01:00 (CET)
  - Summer (DST): UTC+02:00 (CEST)
- INSEE/Postal code: 18069 /18200
- ^{1} French Land Register data, which excludes lakes, ponds, glaciers > 1 km^{2} (0.386 sq mi or 247 acres) and river estuaries.

Colombiers (French pronunciation: [kɔlɔ̃bje]) is a commune in the Cher department in the Centre-Val de Loire region of France.

== Geography ==
A village of farming and forestry situated in the Cher valley some 31 miles (50 km) south of Bourges at the junction of the D101 with the D2144 and the D141 roads.

The Point of Inaccessibility for France (furthest point from any border) lies in Colombiers at 46° 41.925’ N, 2° 32.457’ W.

== Population ==
Historical population
| Year | Pop. | ±% p.a. |
|---|---|---|
| 1968 | 258 | — |
| 1975 | 227 | −1.81% |
| 1982 | 260 | +1.96% |
| 1990 | 320 | +2.63% |
| 1999 | 356 | +1.19% |
| 2007 | 393 | +1.24% |
| 2012 | 404 | +0.55% |
| 2017 | 408 | +0.20% |
| 2023 | 409 | +0.04% |
Source: INSEE

== Sights ==
- The thirteenth-century church of St. Martin.
- The fifteenth-century castle, the chateau of La Salle
- A watermill, le moulin du Bas.
- A seventeenth-century stone cross.

== See also ==
- Communes of the Cher department
