= Jean Godin des Odonais =

French naturalist (1713–1792)

- Born: 5 July 1713; Saint-Amand-Montrond, France
- Died: 1 March 1792 (aged 78); Paris, France
- Occupations: Cartographer, Naturalist

Jean Godin des Odonais (5 July 1713 Saint-Amand-Montrond, France - 1 March 1792 Paris) was a French cartographer and naturalist.

== Biography ==
Godin des Odonais had joined the world's first geodesy expedition to the equator, led by Charles Marie de La Condamine. He had been recommended to La Condamine by the expedition's chief astronomer, his cousin Louis Godin. To be distinguished from his relative, Jean added to his surname that of his mother, Odonais.

When the commission returned to France, Godin des Odonais became professor of astronomy and natural science at the College of Quito, 1739. At the same time he studied the Indian languages and the flora of Ecuador. His marriage to 13-year-old heiress, Isabel Gramesón, in 1741 gave him the means to resign his chair in 1743, after which he gave his whole time to natural science and the Indian language.

He explored Ecuador and the northern provinces of Peru, and collected an herbarium containing more than 4,000 species of plants. He also made drawings of over 800 species of animals. Having lost the greater part of his wife's dowry in speculations, he resolved to try his fortune in Cayenne, where he arrived in May, 1750, and settled on the banks of the river Oyapok. For fifteen years he explored Cayenne and the Brazilian Guiana, north of the Amazon, and collected nearly 7,000 species of plants. From 1765 till 1773 he explored the Amazon.

In the latter year he finally returned to France, and settled on his estate of St. Amand. He gave his botanical collections to the museum of natural history, where they are still preserved. In 1784 he was elected a member of the French Academy of Sciences, and he labored thenceforth to arrange the notes taken during the many years of his explorations.

== Works ==
- Flore raisonnée du Perou, comprenant 4,000 espèces, dont plus de 1,500 nouvelles (6 vols., Paris, 1776, with two volumes of illustrations containing over 750 plates)
- Les plantes de la Guyane (1777)
- Faune du Perou (4 vols., 1778, with two volumes of illustrations)
- Plan de navigation libre de l'Amazone, dedié au Duc de Choiseul (1779)
- Flore de la Guyane, explication de l'herbier déposé au museum d'histoire naturelle, with three volumes of illustrations (5 vols., 1779)
- Flore de l'Amazone, explication, etc. (4 vols., 1780, with one volume of illustrations)
- Grammaire de la langue Quichua ou des Incas (1782)
- Dictionnaire de la langue Quichua (1782)
- Vocabulaire des dialectes Indiens de la Guyane (1783)
- Grammaire comparée des langues Indiennes de l'Amérique du Sud (2 vols., 1784)
