= Canton of Saint-Amand-Montrond =

Coordinates: 46°43′25″N 2°30′20″E

Saint-Amand-Montrond
- Canton
- Interactive map of Saint-Amand-Montrond
- Country: France
- Region: Centre-Val de Loire
- Department: Cher
- No. of communes: {{{nbcomm}}}
- Area: 182.35 km^{2} (70.41 sq mi)
- Population (2023): 15,446
  - Density: 84.705/km^{2} (219.39/sq mi)
- INSEE code: 18 12

The Canton of Saint-Amand-Montrond is a canton situated in the Cher département and in the Centre-Val de Loire region of France. It has 15,328 inhabitants (2018).

== Geography ==
An area of forestry and farming in the valley of the Cher and in the arrondissement of Saint-Amand-Montrond. The altitude varies from 137m at Bruère-Allichamps to 312m at Saint-Amand-Montrond, with an average altitude of 177m.

The canton comprises 13 communes:

- Bouzais
- Bruère-Allichamps
- La Celle
- Colombiers
- Drevant
- Farges-Allichamps
- La Groutte
- Marçais
- Meillant
- Nozières
- Orcenais
- Orval
- Saint-Amand-Montrond

== Population ==
Historical population
Year	Pop.	±% p.a.
2013	16,180	—
2018	15,328	−1.08%
Source: INSEE

== See also ==
- Arrondissements of the Cher department
- Cantons of the Cher department
- Communes of the Cher department
