= Orcenais =

- Commune
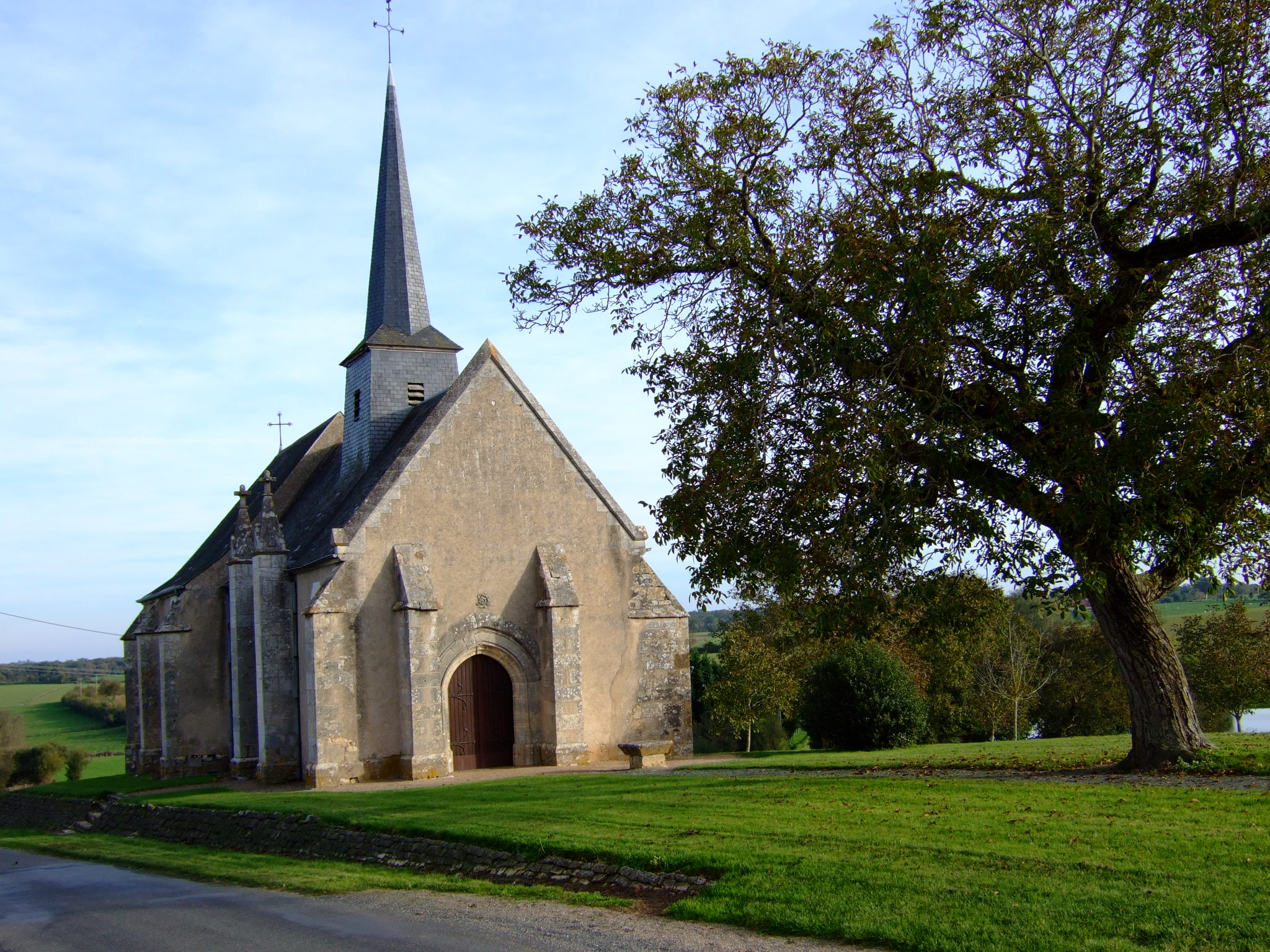
- The church in Orcenais
- Location of Orcenais
- Location within France Location within Centre-Val de Loire
- Coordinates: 46°43′07″N 2°25′31″E
- Country: France
- Region: Centre-Val de Loire
- Department: Cher
- Arrondissement: Saint-Amand-Montrond
- Canton: Saint-Amand-Montrond
- Intercommunality: Cœur de France

Government
  - Mayor (2020–2026): Yan Cadier
- Area^{1}: 18.93 km^{2} (7.31 sq mi)
- Elevation: 172 m (564 ft)
- Highest elevation: 241 m (791 ft)
- Lowest elevation: 162 m (531 ft)
- Population (2023): 239
  - Density: 12.6/km^{2} (32.7/sq mi)
- Time zone: UTC+01:00 (CET)
  - Summer (DST): UTC+02:00 (CEST)
- INSEE/Postal code: 18171 /18200
- ^{1} French Land Register data, which excludes lakes, ponds, glaciers > 1 km^{2} (0.386 sq mi or 247 acres) and river estuaries.

Orcenais (French pronunciation: [ɔʁsənɛ]) is a commune in the Cher department in the Centre-Val de Loire region of France.

== Geography ==
An area of lakes and streams, forestry and farming comprising a village and several hamlets situated some 20 miles (32 km) southeast of Bourges, near the junction of the D925 with the D112 road. The small river Vilaine forms most of the commune’s eastern border.

== Population ==
Historical population
Year	Pop.	±% p.a.
1968	312	—
1975	270	−2.04%
1982	233	−2.08%
1990	265	+1.62%
1999	288	+0.93%
2007	265	−1.03%
2012	256	−0.69%
2017	253	−0.24%
2023	239	−0.94%
Source: INSEE

== Sights ==
- The church of St. Martin, dating from the twelfth century.
- A sixteenth-century manorhouse.
- A fifteenth-century chapel.
- The cemetery cross, bearing the date of 1488.

== See also ==
- Communes of the Cher department
