= Isabel Godin des Odonais =

Spanish traveler

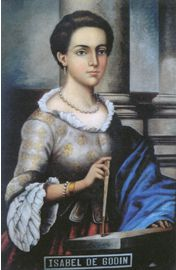
- On Cher (France)
- Born: Isabel Gramesón y Pardo; 14 September 1728; Riobamba, Viceroyalty of Peru (now in Ecuador)
- Died: 28 September 1792 (aged 64); Saint-Amand-Montrond, Cher, France

Isabel Godin des Odonais, née Gramesón y Pardo (14 September 1728 in Riobamba, Viceroyalty of Peru, now in Ecuador – 28 September 1792 in Saint-Amand-Montrond, Cher, France) was an 18th-century Spanish woman who became separated from her French husband in South America by colonial politics, and was not reunited with him until more than 20 years later. Her long difficult journey in the 18th century, from western Peru to the mouth of the Amazon River, is considered extraordinary in the history of South America. Her story has been often repeated and sometimes inspired popular misconceptions of the dangers of the tropical rain forest.

Odonais was born in the Viceroyalty of Peru to a wealthy Criollo family. She was well educated, and met her husband when he came to South America on a scientific expedition. In 1749, her husband, Jean Godin des Odonais, left their home in Riobamba, Ecuador, Spanish South America to visit French Guiana. Because he was a French citizen, he was refused permission by the Spanish and Portuguese authorities to return for his family. After years of waiting for the authorities to relent, Isabel Odonais insisted that she must go to him. Odonais became famous for being the only survivor of a 42-person, 3000-mile expedition through the Amazon Basin to rejoin her husband. They were reunited in 1770 and later returned to France together.

== Background ==
Isabel Godin des Odonais née Gramesón y Pardo was the daughter of Don Pedro Gramesón y Bruno, an administrator in Riobamba, a Spanish colonial city in the Viceroy of Peru. She was well-educated and spoke fluent Spanish, French, and Quechua, and understood the use of quipus, the Incan method of communicating information using colored strings and knots.

Jean Godin des Odonais was a French cartographer and naturalist who had joined the world's first geodesy expedition to the equator. The team worked in the Quito region from 1735 to 1744, during which time Jean and Isabel met. They married on 27 December 1741, when Isabel was thirteen years old.

== Separation ==
At first Jean decided to remain in Riobamba with his new wife, but in 1743 he offered to accompany La Condamine on his next expedition. He stayed behind to see Isabel through her pregnancy. But, when he heard of his father's death in March 1749, Godin decided to return to France with his family. He planned to travel alone to Cayenne, French Guiana via the Amazon to test whether the journey would be safe for them to take, and to make the necessary arrangements with the French authorities.

Upon arriving in Cayenne, Godin found the Portuguese and Spanish colonial authorities would not let him — a Frenchman of no importance — return through their territory. Unwilling to return to France without his family, he became a reluctant resident of French Guiana, constantly writing pleas to Europe to allow for his return to Riobamba. Eventually, La Condamine wrote on Godin's behalf to the Portuguese king, who due to changing political circumstances was eager to befriend the French. In 1765 he ordered a galiot, crewed by thirty oarsmen, to take Godin back to his wife. However, as Godin had written some incendiary letters against the Portuguese, he was suspicious of the offer of passage up the Amazon, and abandoned the ship at its first port. The captain of the galiot continued upriver without him, to fetch the Frenchman's wife as ordered.

For most of their 20-year separation, Isabel received no news of her husband, while enduring the death of her children from smallpox. She moved to the smaller community of Guzman. When she heard rumors that a ship was waiting to take her down the Amazon, she sent her servant Joachim and a handful of Indians to investigate. The party returned two years after having discovered the waiting ship, four years after its initial departure. Isabel's father, Don Pedro, went ahead to the ship to make arrangements and to wait for Isabel.

== Isabel's journey ==
On 1 October 1769 a 42-person party set out for the ship: Isabel, her servant Joachim, Isabel's two brothers Antoine and Eugenio Gramesón, Isabel's ten-year-old nephew Joaquin, three servants: Rosa, Elvia, and Heloise, thirty-one Indians, and three Frenchman. The route across the Andean mountains and Amazon Basin was arduous, made worse by the recent devastation by smallpox of the mission station at Canelos (in present-day Pastaza Province), depriving the party of valuable support nine days into their journey. They found two Indian survivors who agreed to repair a forty-foot canoe, in which they continued down the Amazon.

The river journey proved difficult, with the canoe unmanageable. The Indians from Canelos deserted them, and one of the party drowned trying recover the hat of one of the Frenchmen. With the canoe weighed down by supplies, the party set up camp and sent Joachim and one of the Frenchmen ahead in the canoe, so they could return with extra transport. Waiting for Joachim to return, the others began to suffer from infected insect bites. Infection killed Isabel's nephew Joaquin, then Rosa and Elvia, the remaining Frenchmen and Isabel's brothers. Heloise wandered off in the middle of the night, never to be seen again. With the others dead, Isabel was left wandering alone in the jungle.

When the servant Joachim arrived back at the camp, he found only the bodies of the deceased travelers. Unable to identify Isabel's body, he sent word of her death to Don Pedro — news which later reached Jean Godin. Isabel wandered alone and starving for nine days. Half-crazed, she met four Indians who offered her help in reaching Cayenne. With their help, she was able to reach the waiting ship. The story of her incredible journey soon spread, and she was treated to an increasingly grand reception as she made her way downriver.

== Reunion ==
On 22 July 1770 Isabel and Jean were reunited in the town of Oyapock after more than 20 years of separation. They remained in Cayenne for a few years. On 21 April 1773, Isabel, her husband and her father decided to leave Guiana and finally make their way to metropolitan France. Don Pedro, having been severely disturbed by the events leading up to their arrival in France, died on 28 November 1780. Jean Godin died in their home on the Rue Hotel-Dieu in Saint-Amand-Montrond, Cher, on 1 March 1792. Isabel died there on 27 September the same year.

== Legacy ==
A species of New World monkey, Isabel's saki (Pithecia isabela) is named in honor of her.

== Bibliography ==
- Anthony Smith (2003) The Lost Lady of the Amazon: The Story of Isabela Godin and Her Epic Journey, Carroll & Graf.
- Robert Whitaker (2004) The Mapmaker's Wife: A True Tale of Love, Murder, and Survival in the Amazon, Delta Trade Paperbacks, ISBN 0-385-33720-5.
- Celia Wakefield (1994) Searching for Isabel Godin, Chicago Review Press.
- Larrie D. Ferreiro (2011) Measure of the Earth: The Enlightenment Expedition that Reshaped Our World, Basic Books.
- Carlos Ortiz A. (2000) Una historia de Amor: Isabel Gramesón (Godín), Abya Yala.
