= Communauté de communes du Cœur de France =

Federation of municipalities in Centre-Val de Loire, France

Cœur de France
- Communauté de communes
- Country: France
- Region: Centre-Val de Loire
- Department: Cher
- No. of communes: {{{nbcomm}}}
- Established: 14 December 1999

Government
  - President: Daniel Bone
- Area: 379.1 km^{2} (146.4 sq mi)
- Population (2018): 18,315
  - Density: 48.31/km^{2} (125.1/sq mi)

The communauté de communes du Cœur de France was created on December 14, 1999 and is located in the Cher département of the Centre-Val de Loire region of France. In 2013 it absorbed 6 of the communes of the former Communauté de communes du Berry charentonnais. It seat is the town Saint-Amand-Montrond. Its area is 379.1 km^{2}, and its population was 18,315 in 2018.

== Composition ==
The communauté de communes consists of the following 19 communes:

1. Arpheuilles
2. Bessais-le-Fromental
3. Bouzais
4. Bruère-Allichamps
5. La Celle
6. Charenton-du-Cher
7. Colombiers
8. Coust
9. Drevant
10. Farges-Allichamps
11. La Groutte
12. Marçais
13. Meillant
14. Nozières
15. Orcenais
16. Orval
17. Saint-Amand-Montrond
18. Saint-Pierre-les-Étieux
19. Vernais
