= Bruère-Allichamps =

- Commune
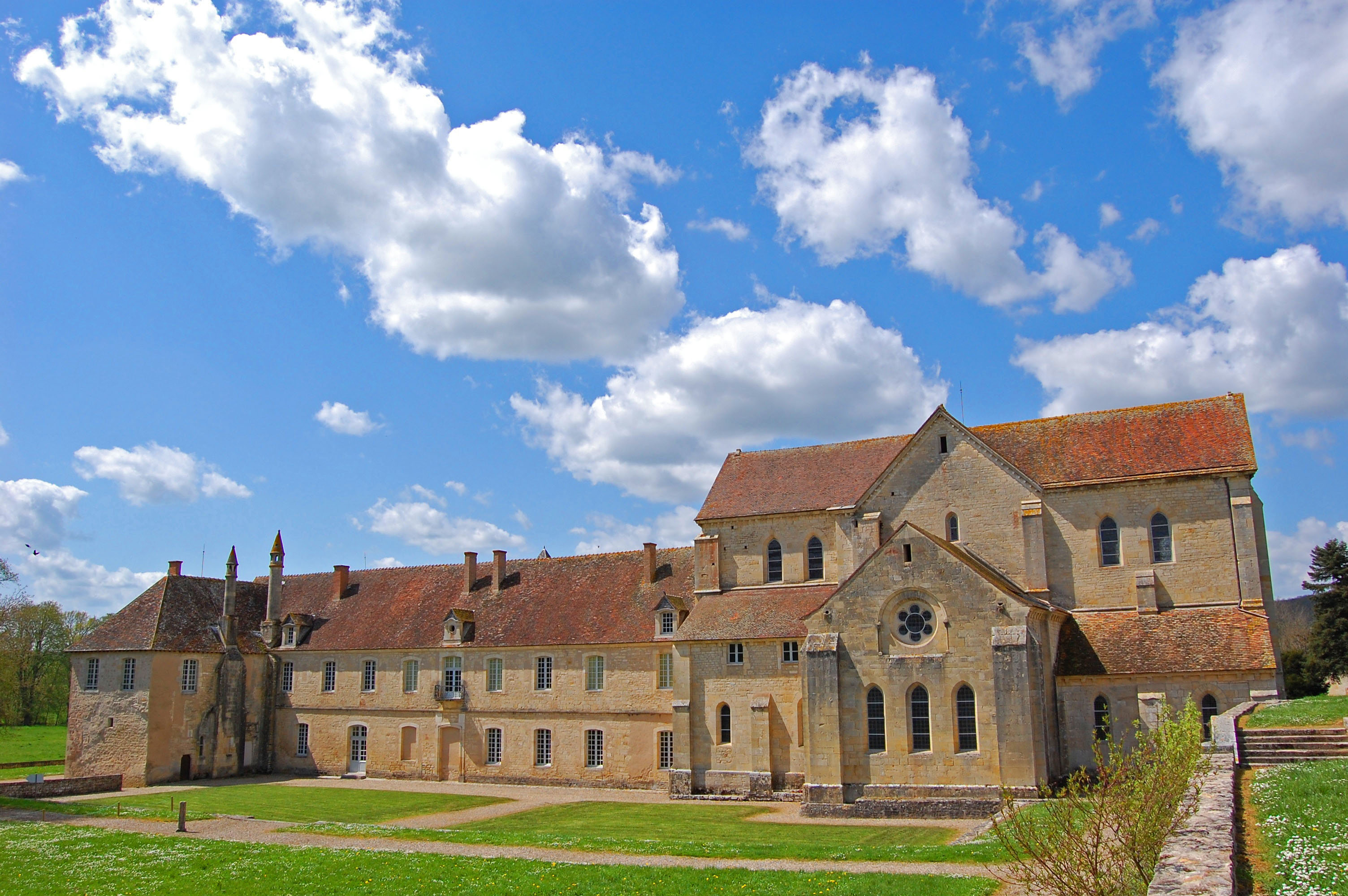
- Noirlac Abbey

- Coat of arms
- Location of Bruère-Allichamps
- Location within France Location within Centre-Val de Loire
- Coordinates: 46°46′09″N 2°26′39″E
- Country: France
- Region: Centre-Val de Loire
- Department: Cher
- Arrondissement: Saint-Amand-Montrond
- Canton: Saint-Amand-Montrond
- Intercommunality: Cœur de France

Government
  - Mayor (2024–2026): Roger Dagher
- Area^{1}: 13.9 km^{2} (5.4 sq mi)
- Elevation: 200 m (660 ft)
- Highest elevation: 217 m (712 ft)
- Lowest elevation: 137 m (449 ft)
- Population (2023): 567
  - Density: 40.8/km^{2} (106/sq mi)
- Time zone: UTC+01:00 (CET)
  - Summer (DST): UTC+02:00 (CEST)
- INSEE/Postal code: 18038 /18200
- ^{1} French Land Register data, which excludes lakes, ponds, glaciers > 1 km^{2} (0.386 sq mi or 247 acres) and river estuaries.

Bruère-Allichamps (French pronunciation: [bʁyɛʁ aliʃɑ̃]) is a commune in the Cher department, Centre-Val de Loire, France.

== Geography ==
An area of forestry, farming and a little light industry comprising the village and a couple of hamlets in the Cher valley 25 miles (40 km) south of Bourges at the junction of the D2144 with the D92 and D35 roads. The A71 autoroute runs through the northern part of the commune's territory. The village is one of seven places claiming to be the geographical centre of France (excluding Corsica and Overseas France).

Suspension bridge with pedestrians, early 20th century

== Population ==
Historical population
Year	Pop.	±% p.a.
1968	669	—
1975	649	−0.43%
1982	631	−0.40%
1990	609	−0.44%
1999	573	−0.67%
2007	572	−0.02%
2012	646	+2.46%
2017	564	−2.68%
2023	567	+0.09%
Source: INSEE

== Sights ==
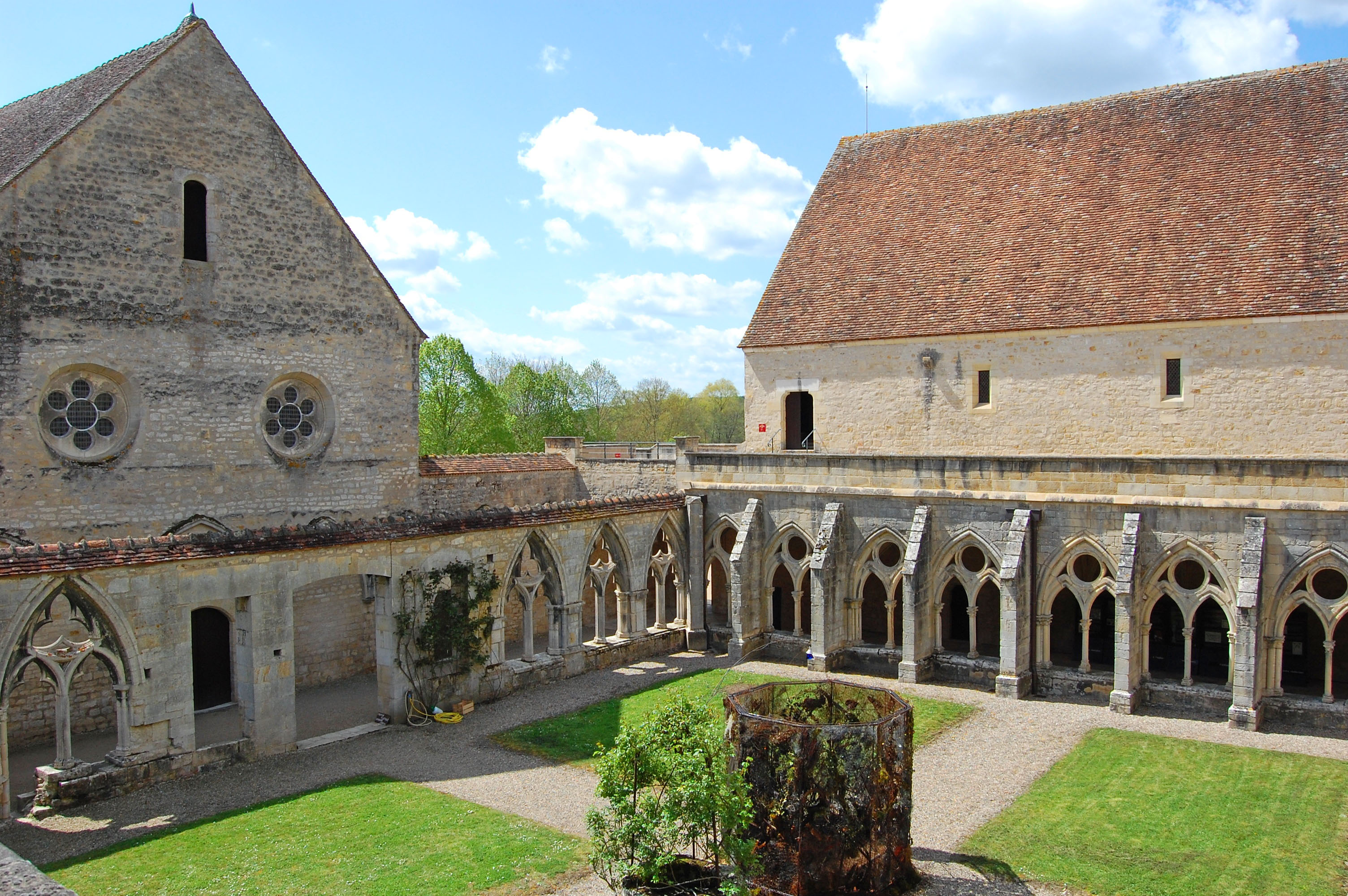
The abbey cloisters

- The abbey of Noirlac, dating from the twelfth century.
- A stone marking the village as the geographic centre of France.
- The twelfth century priory church of Saint-Étienne.
- The Château de Châteaufer, built in 1670.

== See also ==
- Communes of the Cher department
