= Orval, Cher =

Orval
- Commune
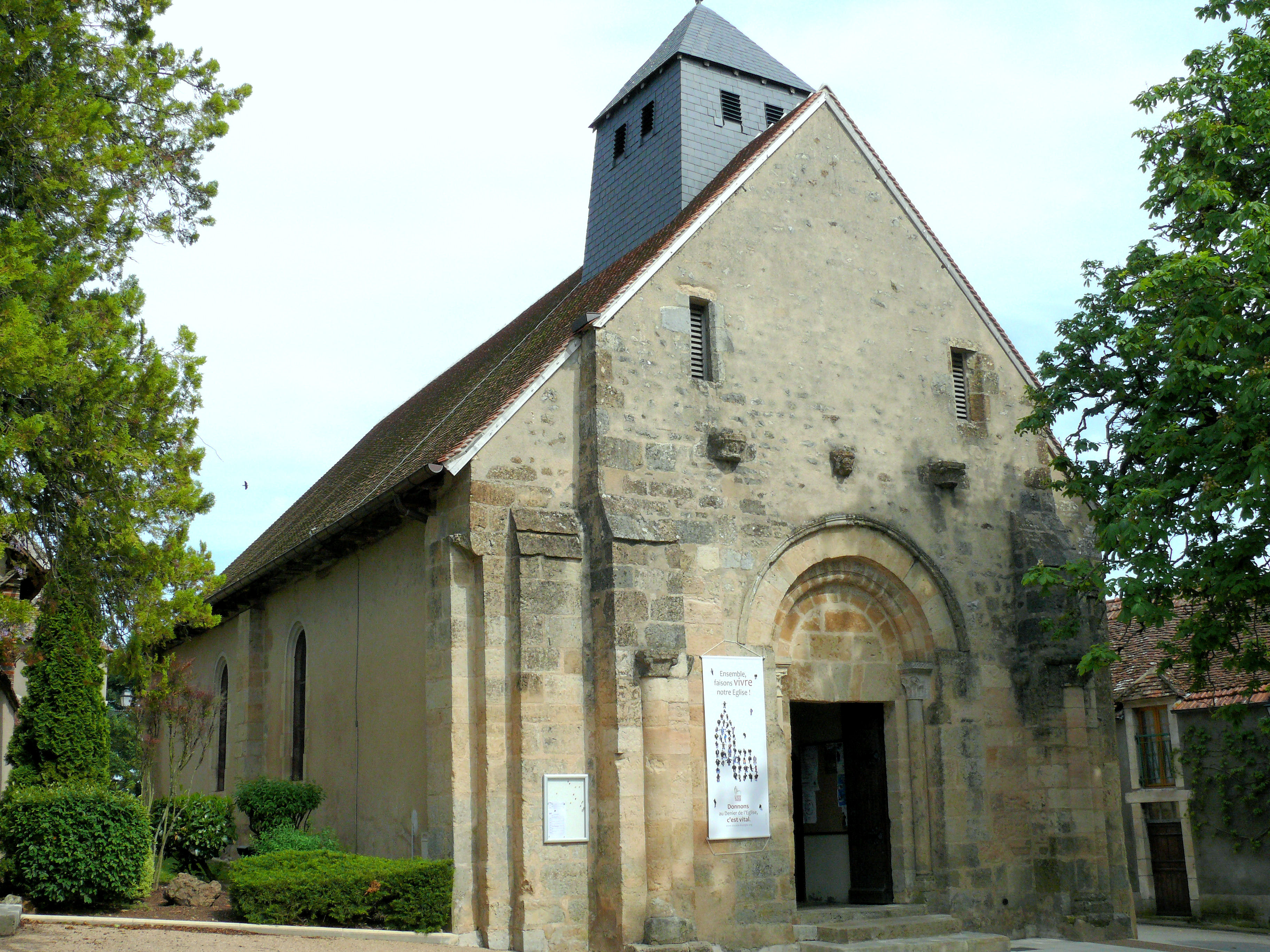
- The church of Saint-Hilaire, in Orval

- Coat of arms
- Location of Orval
- Location within France Location within Centre-Val de Loire
- Coordinates: 46°43′36″N 2°28′57″E
- Country: France
- Region: Centre-Val de Loire
- Department: Cher
- Arrondissement: Saint-Amand-Montrond
- Canton: Saint-Amand-Montrond
- Intercommunality: Cœur de France

Government
  - Mayor (2020–2026): Clarisse Duluc
- Area^{1}: 7.65 km^{2} (2.95 sq mi)
- Elevation: 156 m (512 ft)
- Highest elevation: 199 m (653 ft)
- Lowest elevation: 147 m (482 ft)
- Population (2023): 1,619
  - Density: 212/km^{2} (548/sq mi)
- Time zone: UTC+01:00 (CET)
  - Summer (DST): UTC+02:00 (CEST)
- INSEE/Postal code: 18172 /18200
- ^{1} French Land Register data, which excludes lakes, ponds, glaciers > 1 km^{2} (0.386 sq mi or 247 acres) and river estuaries.

Orval (French pronunciation: [ɔʁval]) is a commune in the Cher department in the Centre-Val de Loire region of France.

== Geography ==
An area of lakes and streams, forestry, farming and some light industry comprising a village and a small hamlet situated some 25 miles (40 km) south of Bourges, at the junction of the D925 with the D921 and D300 roads. The river Cher forms the commune’s eastern border with the town of Saint-Amand-Montrond. Junction 8 of the A71 autoroute is within the commune’s territory and the village is served by a TER train service.

== Population ==
Historical population
Year	Pop.	±% p.a.
1968	1,436	—
1975	1,995	+4.81%
1982	2,055	+0.42%
1990	2,024	−0.19%
1999	1,997	−0.15%
2007	1,893	−0.67%
2012	1,884	−0.10%
2017	1,814	−0.75%
2023	1,619	−1.88%
Source: INSEE

== Sights ==
- The church of St. Hilaire, dating from the twelfth century.
- A sixteenth-century manorhouse at La Tralliere.

== See also ==
- Communes of the Cher department
