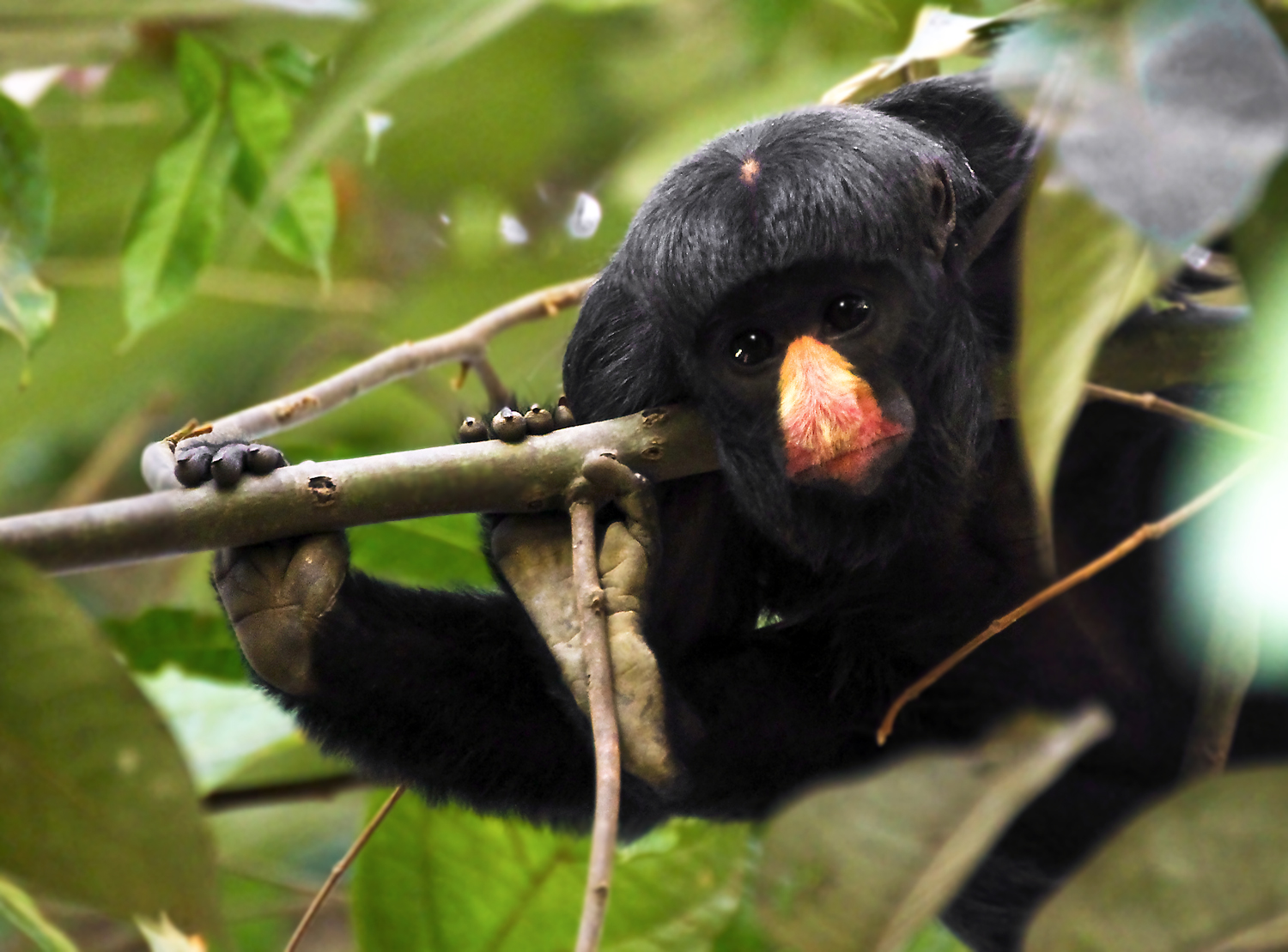

Conservation status
- Vulnerable (IUCN 3.1)
- CITES Appendix I

Scientific classification
- Kingdom: Animalia
- Phylum: Chordata
- Class: Mammalia
- Order: Primates
- Family: Pitheciidae
- Genus: Chiropotes
- Species: C. albinasus

Binomial name
- Chiropotes albinasus (I. Geoffroy Saint-Hilaire & Deville, 1848)
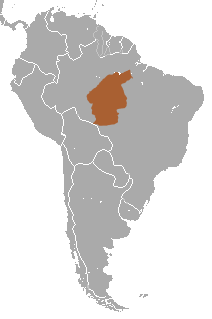
- White-nosed saki range

= White-nosed saki =

Species of New World monkey

The white-nosed saki (Chiropotes albinasus) is a species of bearded saki, a type of New World monkey, endemic to the south-central Amazon rainforest in Brazil. Both its scientific and common name were caused by the authors working from dead specimens, where the skin on and around the nose fades to a whitish color. In living individuals, the nose is actually bright pink (though with fine barely visible white hairs). Pelage on the body tends to be black in males and brown to brownish-grey in females. No other species of the genus Chiropotes have a brightly coloured nose.

This species is considered to be "medium-sized". They are a primary consumer that eats seeds, fruit, flowers, bark, insects and leaves. They are also a social species that arrange themselves into large groups for many reasons such as sleeping, food gathering and travel arrangements. These social groups are important in situations where they are under attack by a predator as they decide on their anti-predation strategies depending on the number of them available at the time. They are seasonal breeders, only reproducing in specific months during the year. In the 2020 IUCN Red List report, this species was listed as vulnerable with a decreasing population.

== Distribution and habitat ==
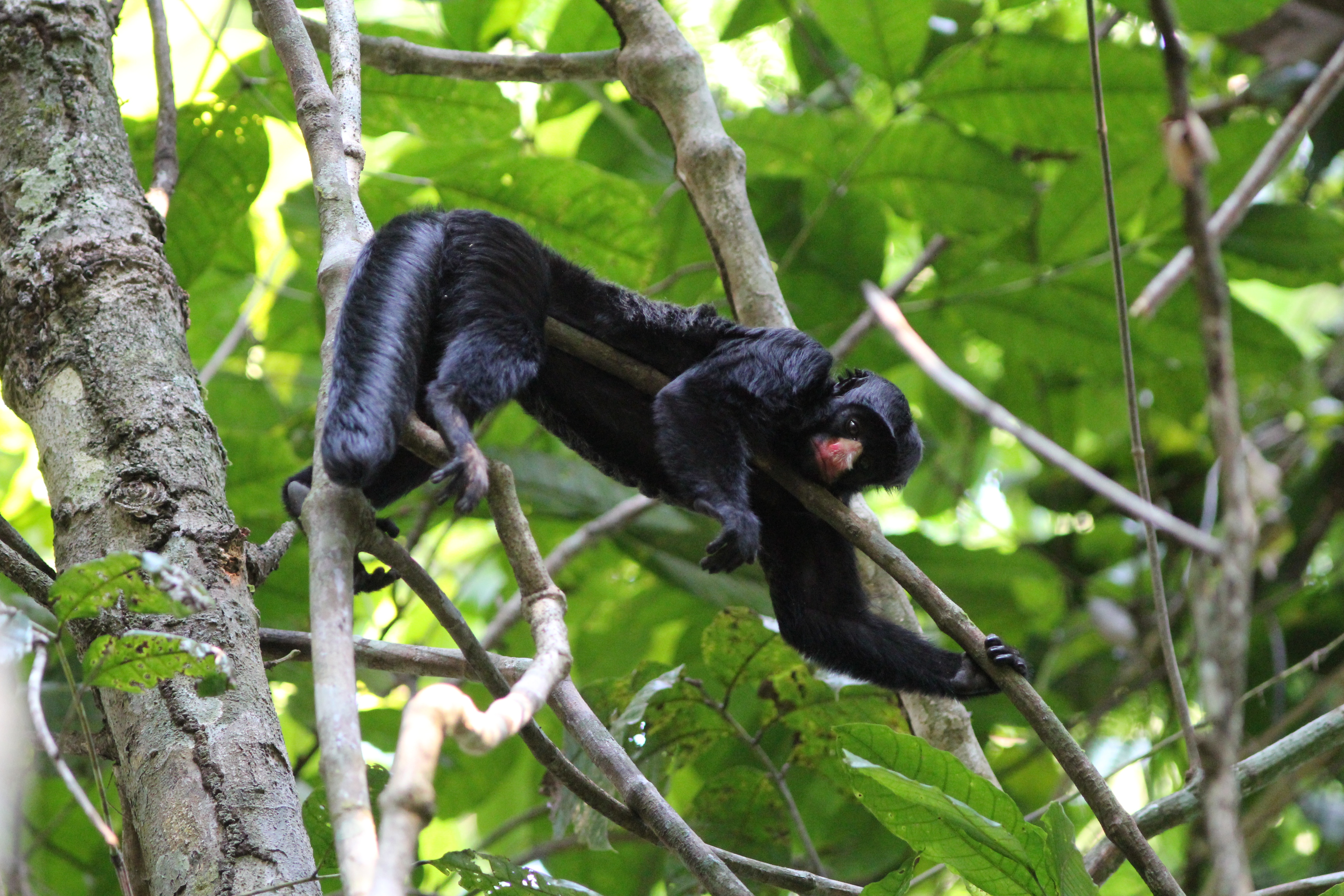
The white-nosed saki spotted in the upper canopies.

=== Geographical distribution ===
The distribution of this species depends on their ability to survive and adapt to drastic changes in the environment. They are known to be able to handle difficult environmental changes to the point where they can survive for a long period of time before having to move elsewhere. According to research, they are distributed mostly throughout the south-east and south-central regions of the Amazon Rainforest which extends into the country of Brazil. They are dominant in the southern region of the Amazon since they share the eastern part with the Uta Hicks bearded saki which causes problems with food availability. They have also been observed towards the south-western area of the Dos Marmelos River in Brazil.

=== Habitat preferences ===
As a primary consumer, the white-nosed saki is dependent on habitats with enough food supply. Due to their similarity in diet with other Chiropotes, it is rare to find this species in habitats where they are required to coexist and compete over food supply. They are mainly found in terra firma ecosystems within the Amazon, where their preferred food source of immature seeds is readily available. This species prefers primary terra firma forests which means it has had little to no human disturbance. These forests are known for their "poor soils", but this is not an issue for this species. In fact, they live within this ecosystem because of their ability to easily organise groups for foraging to find their required food source. Although their habitat preference is mainly dependent on food availability, this species also prefers to live within the shaded comfort of upper canopies which are the main characteristic of this particular habitat. These upper canopies are where they have been observed spending most of their day-to-day lives. This species has also been found living and passing through "mountain savanna forests" due to the high elevation; however, this is not as common.

== Morphology ==
=== Physical characteristics ===
The white-nosed saki has three common physical features including a beard, two "tufts of hair" on its head, and a long "bushy" tail. Its physical characteristics make it easy to identify amongst other species of the genus Chiropotes. Their distinct features include an entirely black, "silky" fur body in contrast with their "reddish-pinkish" noses and lips. In fact, their name can be confusing because although they have 'white' hairs on their noses, the skin of their nose is a brighter mix of red and pink which makes it the more visible colour. Although both the male and female have the same physical features, the female can be distinguished to the male through their shorter and thinner hair within their tufts and beards. Two of their most important body parts include their tail and teeth. The function of their tail changes from when they are young. It is initially used for swinging across canopies, but then becomes "non-prehensile" and used only for balance as they become adults. Regarding balance, this species uses their tail to support them during suspensory behaviours, mostly with feeding. Their teeth on the other hand are described as being of a "canine" appearance and these help them break through the tougher foods they eat e.g., fruits and seeds with harder outer shells.

=== Body measurements ===
Various research papers have produced similar data which describe this species to be of a medium size. On average, weight measurements were found to be between a minimum of 2.5 kg and a maximum of 3.1 kg, with the female weighing less across all studies. In one of the earlier studies in 1981, José Márcio Ayres found that the female weighed in at 2.52 kg and the male at 3.17 kg. Another study in 1992 found that the female weighed 2.51 kg, while the male weighed 3.02 kg. Then one of the more recent studies in 2009 identified the female weight to be roughly 2.56 kg with the male weighing in at 3.06 kg. In terms of length, the head and body combined measurements for the male and female were measured across two studies. The first measured 39.5 cm for females and 40.2 cm for males, while the other measured females at 41.8 cm and males at 42.7 cm. Generally, their body measurements and weight, in combination with their tails for balance and support, makes them "agile and fast-moving" and "super climbers and leapers".

== Behaviours ==
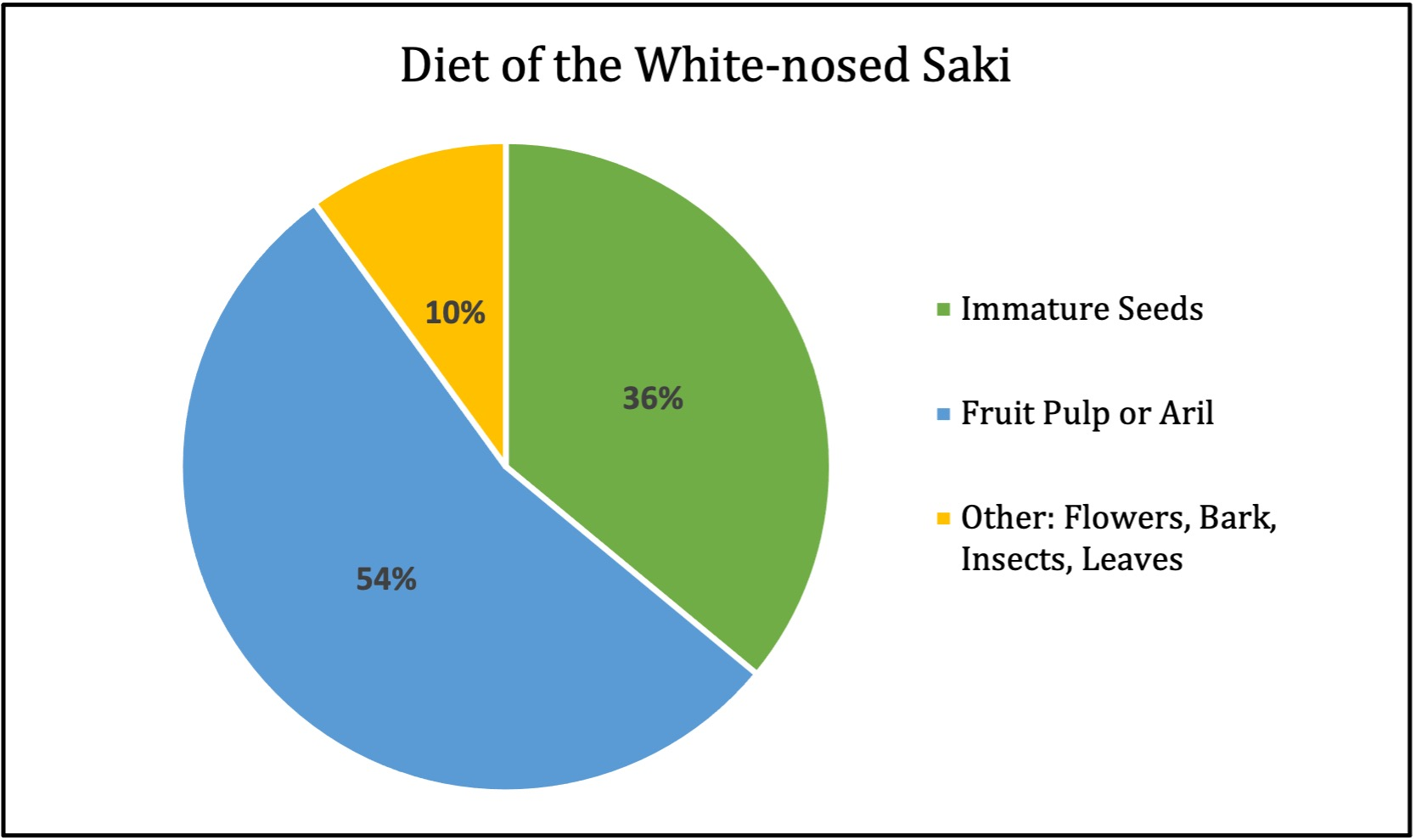
Pie chart showing the percentages of foods which make up the white-nosed saki's diet.

=== Social behaviours ===
The white-nosed saki are a diurnal species who engage in various activities during the day through the formation of groups which is their main system of socialisation. These groups have been found to consist of 19–30 individuals of both males and females. Their grouping is referred to as a "fission-fusion" system which involves them coming together for sleeping or food gathering, and then separating throughout the day for other activities. Although they group together and rely on each other for many of these reasons, they have very few means of communication with one another. Those that they do use are all based on sound and often occur only while performing certain activities together where cooperation is important. For example, they are louder and use a higher pitch "alarm call" for getting each other's attention generally, or during times of danger, but use more of a lower pitch during points where they are concentrated on a specific task such as relaxing or eating. They do also use some visual communication forms, with the main one being "tail wagging" used to show confusion. In general, although they communicate in some ways with one another, they have been described as a shy species when it comes to social interaction and behaviour. Although a few different interactions have been observed, it has been claimed that the intended meaning behind these calls remains under researched.

=== Anti-predator behaviours ===
Predation has a big impact on the way that the white-nosed saki conducts their everyday lives when it comes to "social organisation", "foraging strategies", choosing "sleeping site[s]" and then deciding how much time is spent on each of these activities. Their largest known predator are birds of prey (e.g., the black hawk-eagle). For this reason, they perform either "reactive" or "crypsis" related behaviours when they are under attack. Studies conducted in 2017 which observed many predation events across the Brazilian Amazonia discovered six common anti-predation behaviours and strategies used by this species. The reactive ones included "mobbing, alarm calling" and "fleeing", while their crypsis behaviours involved "freezing, increasing of inter-individual distance within a group, and hiding". From these behaviours, alarm calling, spreading out and hiding are those which most often occur after the attack. Spreading out has been claimed to be a "strong anti-predator strategy" as it provides them with a clearer view over the existing predator and new potential threats, it increases their ability to hide better when they are alone, and it also allows them to continue communicating with each other over larger distances to confuse the predator. When it comes to hiding, in this study the species was observed in 7 out of 9 encounters dropping from their positions in the higher canopies to lower more "denser vegetation" where there are better chances for increased coverage. In cases where the vegetation is too dense and they cannot drop down, they will choose to move along the ground. Taking into consideration the fact that this species relies on organising themselves into fission-fusion systems, it is normal that their anti-predation strategies change depending on how many individuals are with the group at any one time. In fact, they perform more reactive responses to predation when their group is of a larger number. Often, it is the males who take charge in the more reactive behaviours of "defence" and "rescue", for example, all the males within the group will spread out equally between the females who are carrying infants to provide them with extra protection. Though, there have been exceptions recorded where the females have also equally performed defence duties as members of their fission-fusion groups. All these behaviours have been stated as typical for any primate species since they are labelled "risk-sensitive animals" who constantly develop and change their reactions depending on the severity of threatening events. They do this to lessen the amount of energy they use or waste on harmless situations. This need to constantly change their anti-predation strategies has been identified as a common action for smaller primate species considering they are usually more at danger of being attacked than those that are larger in size.

=== Reproduction ===
As with the case of communication, reproduction of this species is another area that is under researched. The reason for lack of research is due to the fact that observations were made during a time when they were captured, and not in their natural habitat. Regardless, the observations found that they are a seasonal breeder. The months which have been recorded as having the most births during this breeding season includes the earlier months between "February and March", and those later in the year around "August and September". The pregnancy development phase, also known as the gestation period, has been studied to occur over a period of 5 months before reaching birth. The birth of one infant has been recorded as the usual amount for a female to have over the period of a year. Once born, the mother is the one who takes on most of the parental care by providing the infant with food and bringing it along with her everywhere she goes.

== Diet ==
The white-nosed saki is a primary consumer and a frugivore. Their general diet consists of mainly immature seeds, fruit, flowers, bark, insects, and leaves. The proportion of these food categories includes 36% seeds, 54% fruit pulp and aril, and then the final 10% is made up of bark, insects, and leaves. With fruit, they prefer it when it is unripe. With seeds, they are considered one of the more important foods in their diet since it is their "major protein source". One study described these seeds that they consume as being elastic and highly fibrous ... with [a] high crushing resistance". Although mainly eating fruits and plants, this species is not considered a very picky eater when it comes to these food categories as they have been found to eat a wide variety of over a hundred different plant types within the Brazilian Amazonia.

== Conservation ==
Under the 2020 IUCN Red List report, there have been a few key threats listed as the contributing factors to this species vulnerable status. These include environmental changes involving deforestation and habitat destruction due to human-induced activities such as logging, agriculture, housing settlements, hunting and more. Hunting is considered one of the more direct threats as this exact species are recognised for the quality of their bushy tails which are used in the production of cleaning dusters. Considering the consistency of these threats, it has been predicted that there will be a loss of around 30% of this species within the space of 30 years. Although these threats have resulted in better international export controls, it is stated that there needs to be more management on agriculture because of its harmful effects on their habitats. Increased agricultural management is hoped to prevent the 15% habitat loss which has been projected to happen by 2048 based on current statistics around damage to the environment. Also, it has been suggested that further research needs to be conducted on this species to determine which conservation efforts would help improve the likelihood of their survival.
