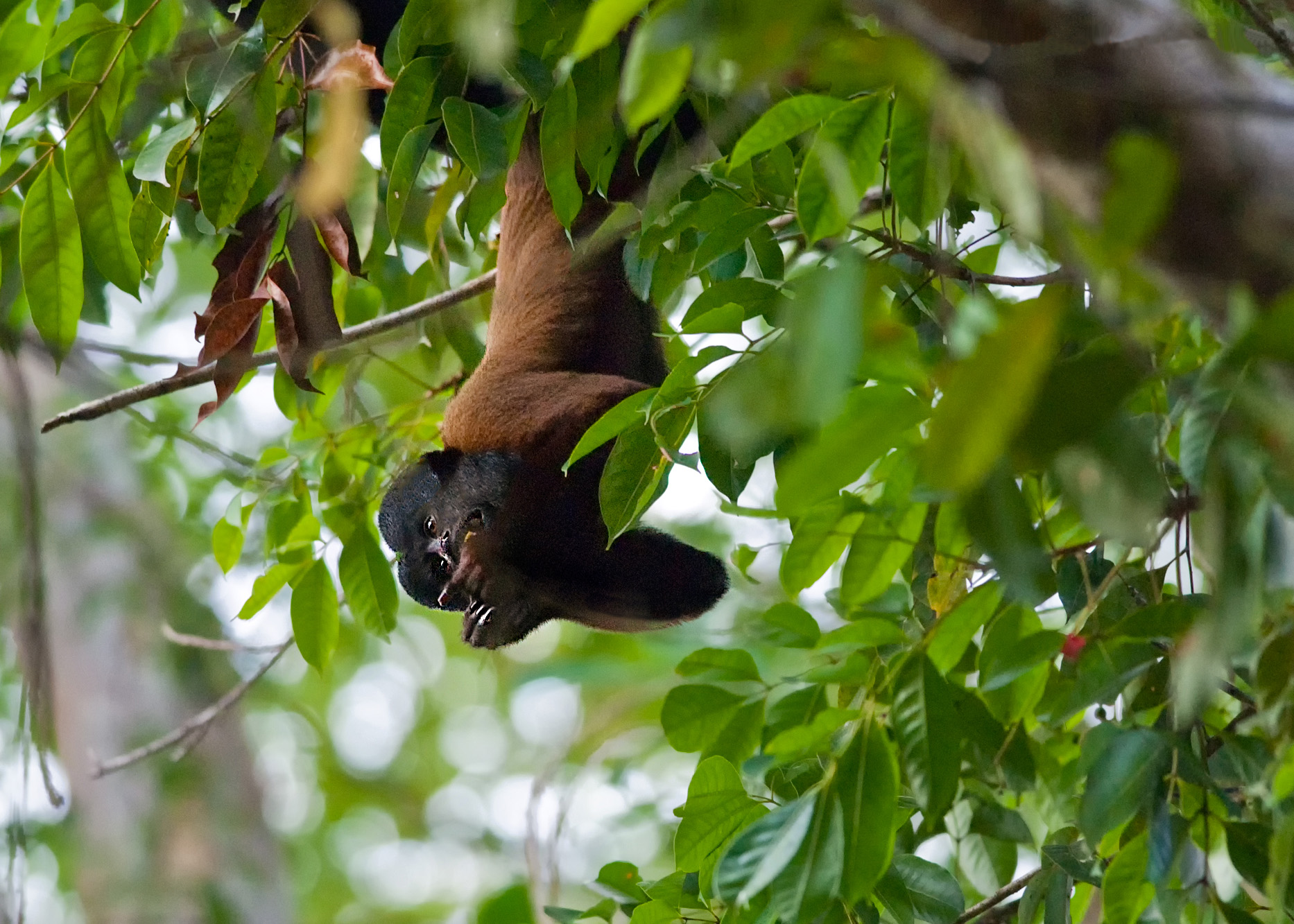
- C. chiropotes in Guyana

Conservation status
- Least Concern (IUCN 3.1)

Scientific classification
- Kingdom: Animalia
- Phylum: Chordata
- Class: Mammalia
- Infraclass: Placentalia
- Order: Primates
- Family: Pitheciidae
- Genus: Chiropotes
- Species: C. chiropotes

Binomial name
- Chiropotes chiropotes (Humboldt, 1811)
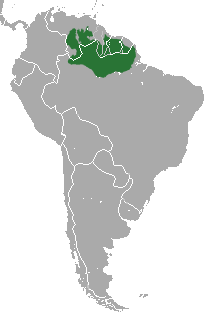
- Combined distribution of red-backed bearded saki and brown-backed bearded saki

= Red-backed bearded saki =

Species of New World monkey

The red-backed bearded saki (Chiropotes chiropotes) is a New-World monkey, from South America. It is a species of bearded saki.

== Description and physical characteristics ==
The Red backed bearded saki has a thick beard, especially males. It has a shock of hair on each side of its head. Its body is entirely covered with dense hair whose colour varies from red to yellowish gold. Its non-prehensile, bushy tail is almost as long as its body. Females are generally smaller than males. The latter is about 45 cm long and between 2.6 and 7.1 kg. It moves on its four legs but is able to stand upright.

== Lifestyle ==
=== Diet ===
Red-backed bearded sakis are primarily frugivores, feeding on seeds, flowers, nuts and fruits but their diet also includes insects, larvae and spiders. They can eat about 100 different species of plants.

They have dental adaptations which allow them to crack pods easily.

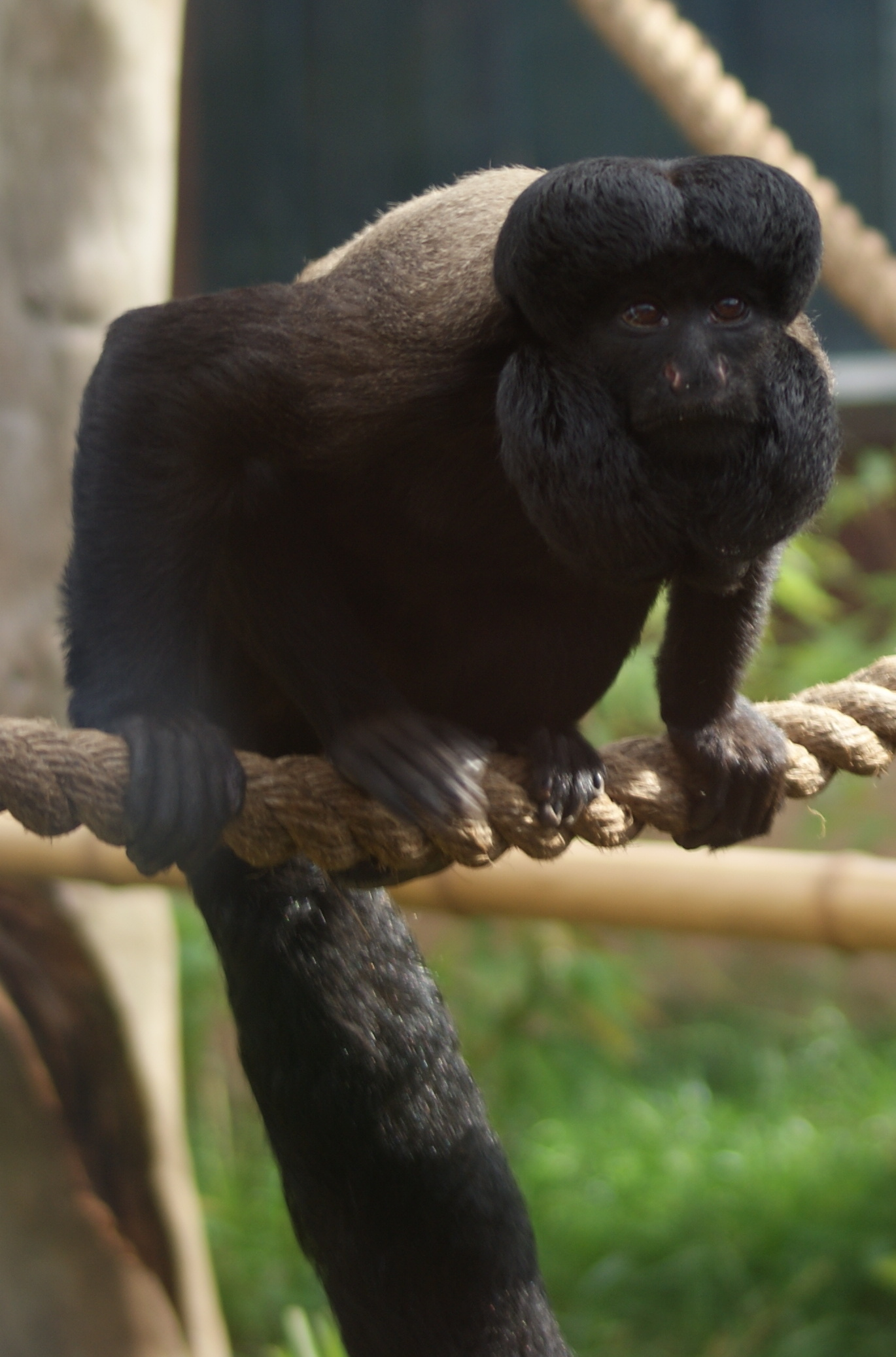
Red-backed bearded saki

=== Behaviour ===
Chiropotes are diurnal primates, that is to say they are active from sunrise to just before sunset. They live in groups of about forty members with both sexes, occasionally separated in clusters when travelling or looking for food, their main occupation.

=== Habitat ===
It is found North of the Amazon River and East of the Branco River, in Brazil, Venezuela and the Guianas.

=== Reproduction ===
Females give birth to one cub at a time after five months gravidity, during the rainy season.

== Conservation ==
Red-backed bearded sakis are not considered endangered by the International Union for Conservation of Nature (IUCN), even if they are sometimes hunted for their meat. There are 27 red-backed bearded sakis in zoos around the world.

== Taxonomy ==
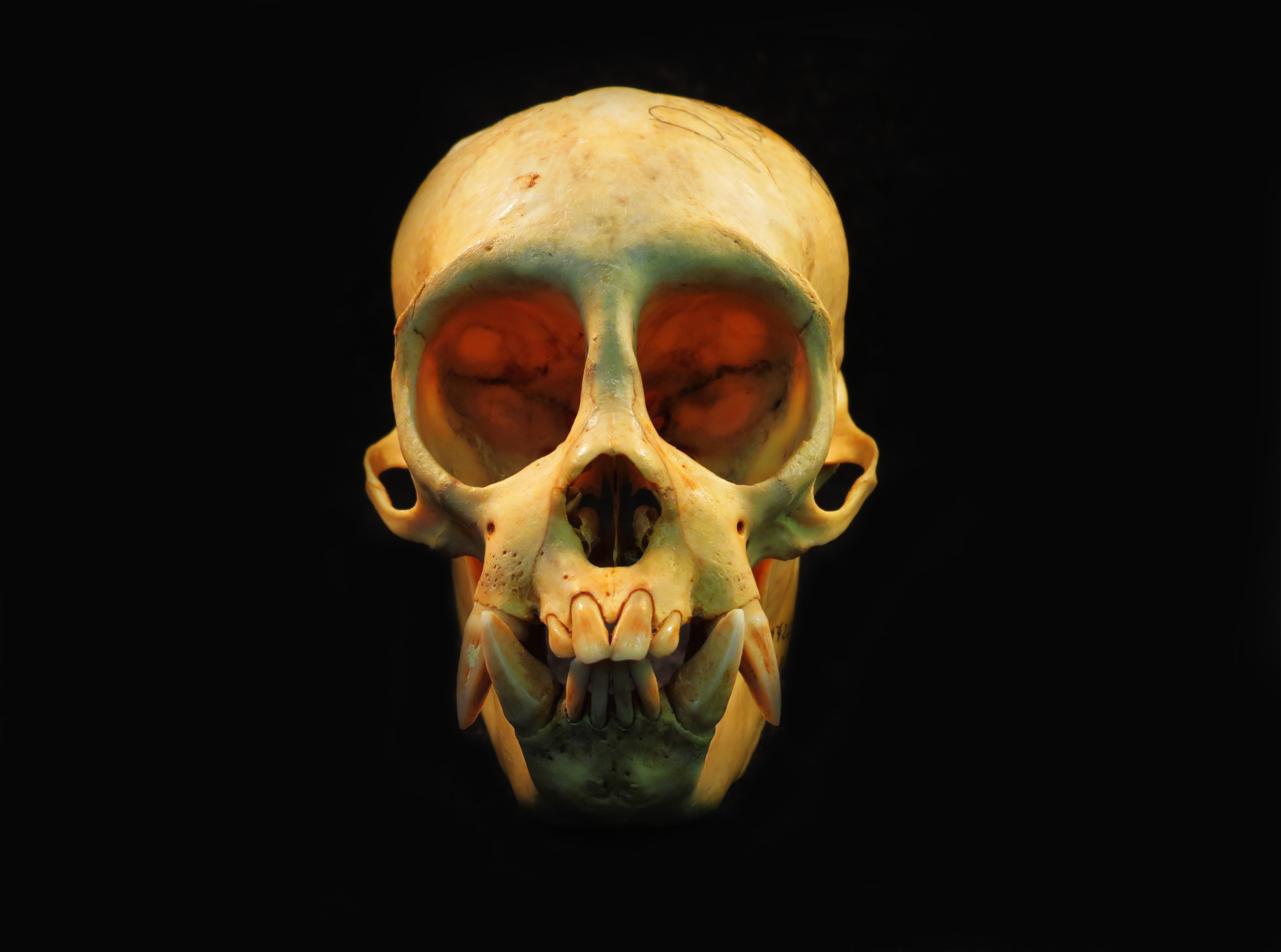
Skull.

Previously, this and all other dark-nosed bearded sakis were included as subspecies (or taxonomically insignificant variations) of C. satanas. Based on molecular and morphological evidence, C. utahickae, C. chiropotes and C. sagulatus were split from C. satanas in 2002. C. chiropotes and C. sagulatus were the only members of the genus found north of the Amazon River, with the former west of the Branco River (a major zoogeographic barrier) and the latter east. Supporting evidence for the basic split into four species of dark-nosed bearded sakis was published in 2003, though with one significant difference compared to the earlier study: They treated the population east of the Branco River as C. chiropotes (C. sagulatus in the 2002 study) and west of the river as C. israelita (C. chiropotes in the 2002 study). The taxonomy proposed in 2003 was followed in Mammal Species of the World in 2005. In the study in 2003, a direct comparison of C. israelita and the type specimen of C. chiropotes was not included, but it is assumed that bearded sakis in Venezuela are C. israelita, while C. chiropotes is not present in that country, thereby matching what would be expected from a species pair separated by the Branco River. This is potentially problematic, as the type specimen of C. chiropotes is from Venezuela, which could leave israelita as a junior synonym of C. chiropotes, thereby matching the taxonomy proposed in 2002. Due to this confusion, neither C. sagulatus nor C. israelita were recognized by the IUCN in 2008, which maintained all bearded sakis north of the Amazon River as C. chiropotes. However, regardless of the uncertainties over exactly what population the species name chiropotes belongs to, it is clear that there are two distinct populations of bearded sakis north of the Amazon River: A reddish-backed from the Branco River and eastward, and a brown-backed from the Branco River and westward.
