= Brown-backed bearded saki =

Scientific classification
- Kingdom: Animalia
- Phylum: Chordata
- Class: Mammalia
- Infraclass: Placentalia
- Order: Primates
- Family: Pitheciidae
- Genus: Chiropotes
- Species: C. israelita

Binomial name
- Chiropotes israelita Spix, 1823

Species of New World monkey

The brown-backed bearded saki (Chiropotes israelita) is one of five species of bearded saki, a type of New World monkey. It is endemic to the Amazon in north-western Brazil (north of the Rio Negro and west of the Branco River) and southern Venezuela. It is possible the correct scientific name for this species is C. chiropotes, in which case the more easterly red-backed bearded saki would be named C. sagulatus. The IUCN lists the reddish-brown bearded saki (C. sagulatus) as a valid species, with C. israelita as a synonym, but also notes they might both be valid.

== Taxonomy ==
Previously, this and all other dark-nosed bearded sakis were included as subspecies (or taxonomically insignificant variations) of C. satanas. Based on molecular and morphological evidence, C. utahickae, C. chiropotes and C. sagulatus were split from C. satanas in 2002. C. chiropotes and C. sagulatus were the only members of the genus found north of the Amazon River, with the former west of the Branco River (a major zoogeographic barrier) and the latter east. Supporting evidence for the basic split into four species of dark-nosed bearded sakis was published in 2003, though with one significant difference compared to the earlier study: They treated the population east of the Branco River as C. chiropotes (C. sagulatus in the 2002 study) and west of the river as C. israelita (C. chiropotes in the 2002 study). The taxonomy proposed in 2003 was followed in Mammal Species of the World in 2005. In the study in 2003, a direct comparison of C. israelita and the type specimen of C. chiropotes was not included, but it is assumed that bearded sakis in Venezuela are C. israelita, while C. chiropotes is not present in that country, thereby matching what would be expected from a species pair separated by the Branco River. This is potentially problematic, as the type specimen of C. chiropotes is from Venezuela, which could leave israelita as a junior synonym of C. chiropotes, thereby matching the taxonomy proposed in 2002. Due to this confusion, neither C. sagulatus nor C. israelita were recognized by the IUCN in 2008, which maintained all bearded sakis north of the Amazon River as C. chiropotes. However, regardless of the uncertainties over exactly what population the specific name chiropotes belongs to, it is clear that there are two distinct populations of bearded sakis north of the Amazon River: A reddish-backed from the Branco River and eastward, and a brown-backed from the Branco River and westward.
