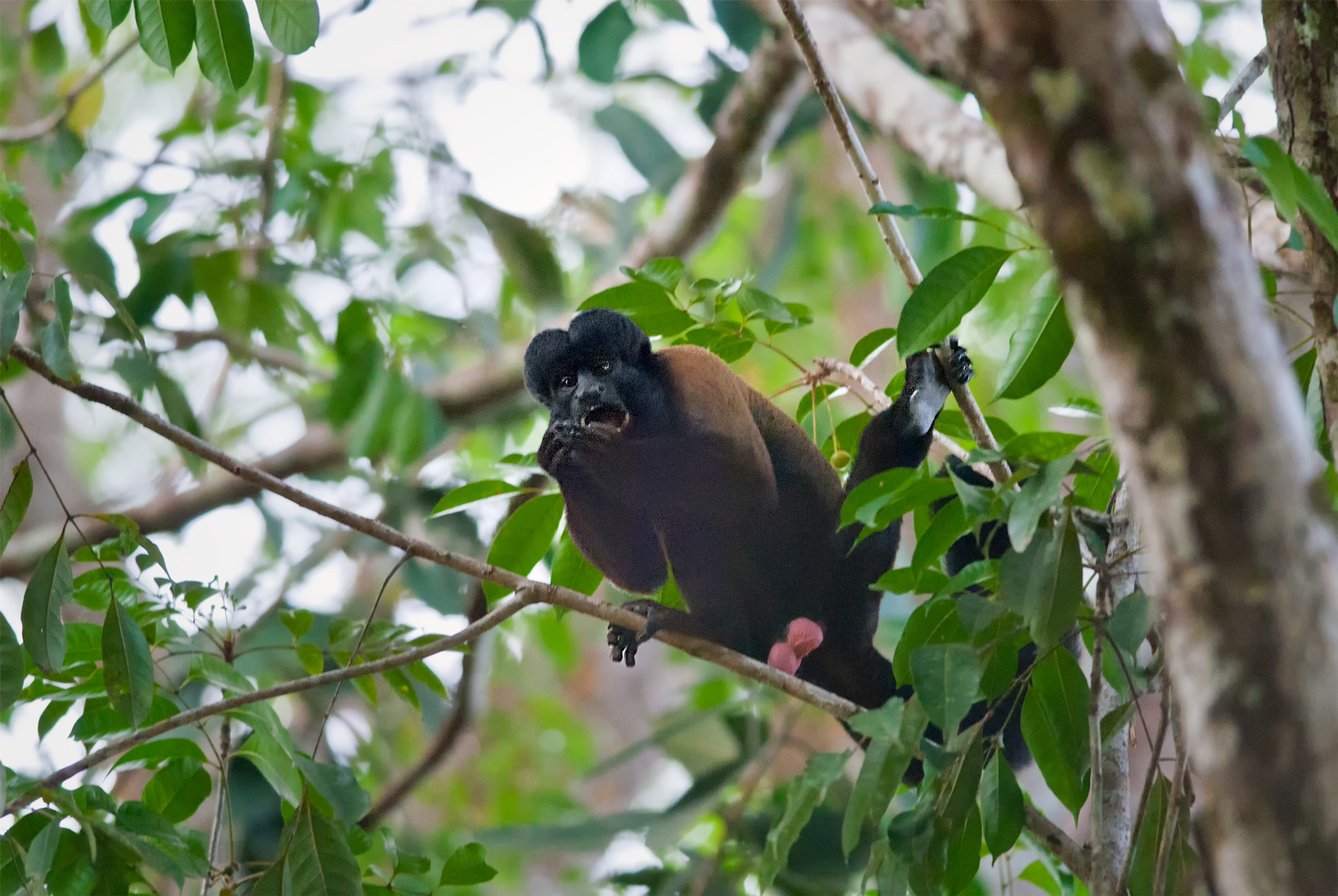

Conservation status
- Least Concern (IUCN 3.1)

Scientific classification
- Kingdom: Animalia
- Phylum: Chordata
- Class: Mammalia
- Order: Primates
- Family: Pitheciidae
- Genus: Chiropotes
- Species: C. sagulatus

Binomial name
- Chiropotes sagulatus (Traill, 1821)
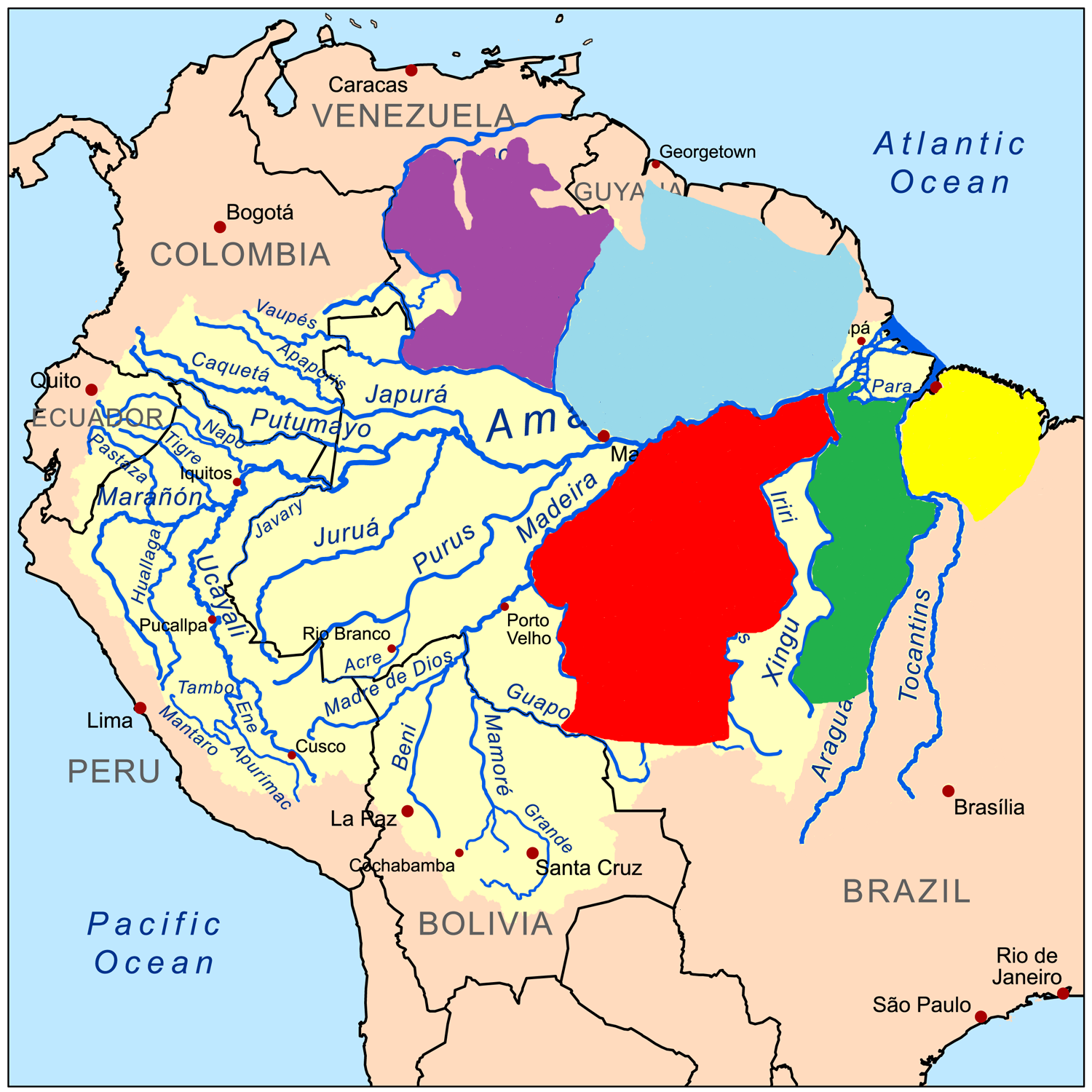
- Distribution of Chiropotes sagulatus in light blue

= Reddish-brown bearded saki =

Species of New World monkey

The reddish-brown bearded saki (Chiropotes sagulatus) is a species of bearded saki, a type of New World monkey, endemic to Brazil, French Guiana, Guyana, and Suriname. The IUCN notes that this is possibly a synonym for Chiropotes israelita, though the two populations of sakis may be distinct species.
