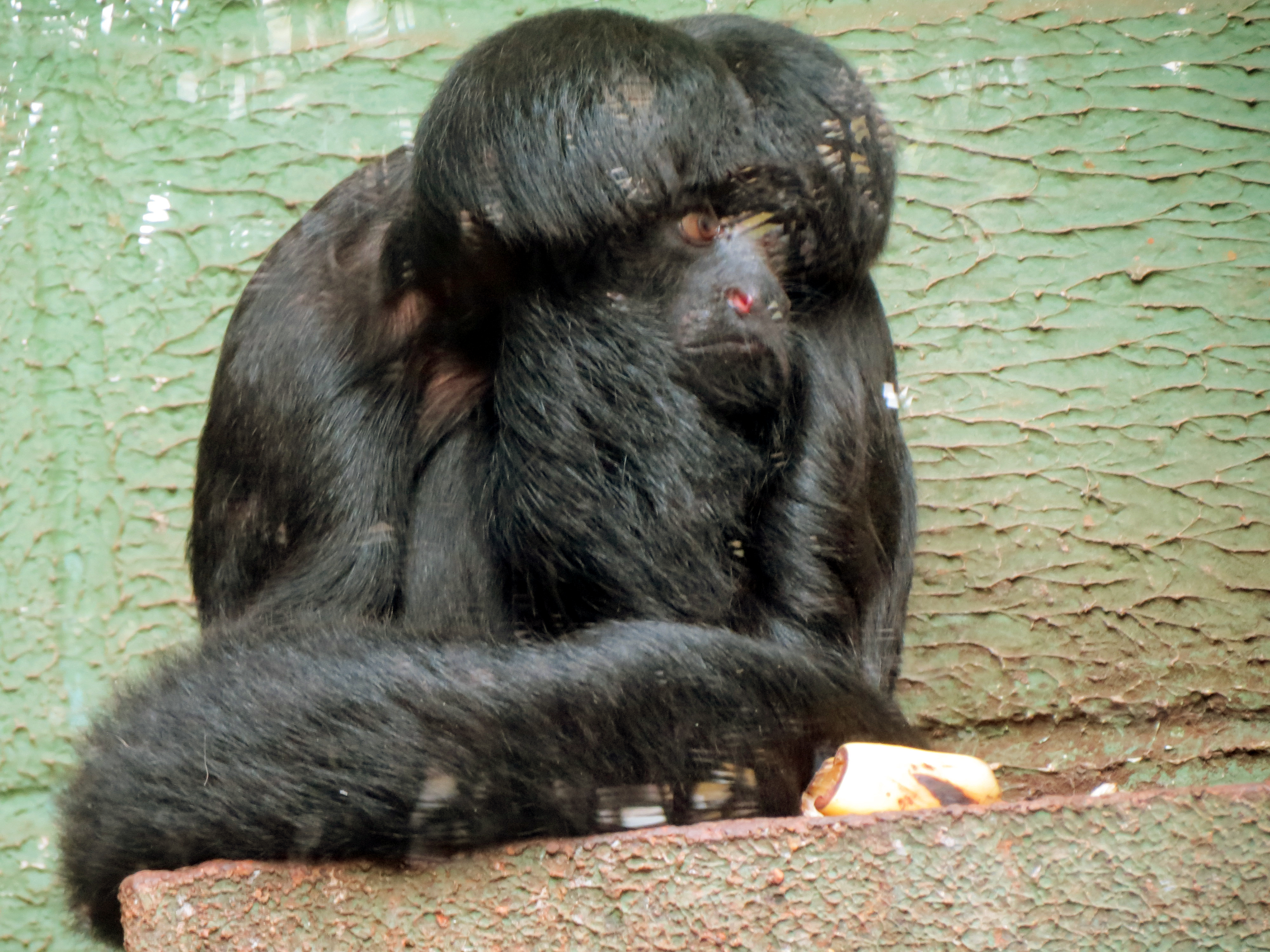

Conservation status
- Endangered (IUCN 3.1)

Scientific classification
- Kingdom: Animalia
- Phylum: Chordata
- Class: Mammalia
- Order: Primates
- Family: Pitheciidae
- Genus: Chiropotes
- Species: C. satanas

Binomial name
- Chiropotes satanas (Hoffmannsegg, 1807)
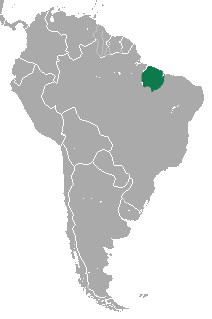
- Black bearded saki range

= Black bearded saki =

Species of New World monkey

The black bearded saki (Chiropotes satanas) is a species of New World monkey, native to the Amazon rainforest of South America, specifically to an area of north-eastern Brazil. It is one of five species of bearded saki. Bearded sakis are medium-sized (50 cm), mostly frugivorous primates, specialised in seed predation. The genus name Chiropotes comes from Ancient Greek χείρ (kheír), meaning "hand", and ποτης (potēs), meaning "drinker", as the black bearded saki is sometimes observed immersing their hands in water and then bringing them to their mouth to drink. This behaviour was later found to be widespread among monkey species and not a distinguishing feature of this genus or species. The black bearded saki's habitat has undergone heavy habitat fragmentation, making the future conservation status of the species uncertain.

== Distribution and habitat ==
The black bearded saki is endemic to the far eastern Amazon in Brazil, in a range restricted to a relatively small region from the Tocantins River in Pará east to around the Grajaú River in Maranhão (similar to the range of the equally threatened Kaapori capuchin). The natural home range of this species can vary from 200 to 250 ha (490 to 620 acres). It is the only Amazonian pitheciid found east of the Tocantins River. Studies show that it can adapt to a reduction in their habitat.

== Anatomy and morphology ==
The black bearded saki can be identified by its thick black hair, distinctive beard that shapes the face, and a bushy fox-like tail. The tail is non-prehensible and it uses quadrupedal movement for locomotion. The black bearded saki has some yellowish-brown highlights around the back and shoulders and can weigh from 2 to 4 kg (4.4 to 8.8 lb). Males are slightly larger than females and also have a bulging forehead. Formerly the red-backed, brown-backed and Uta Hick's bearded sakis, the other member of the genus Chiropotes, were classified as subspecies or taxonomically insignificant variations of the same species called the bearded saki, but based on pelage differences and molecular analysis it has been recommended to treat them as separate species. The black bearded saki is the only dark-nosed species of bearded saki with a blackish back, though some females and juveniles have a paler, brownish back. The teeth have evolved for seed predation: these dental adaptations allow then to crack and access seeds in extremely hard pods. They open hard-shelled fruits in a specialized, efficient process using their teeth.

== Behavior ==
=== Diet ===
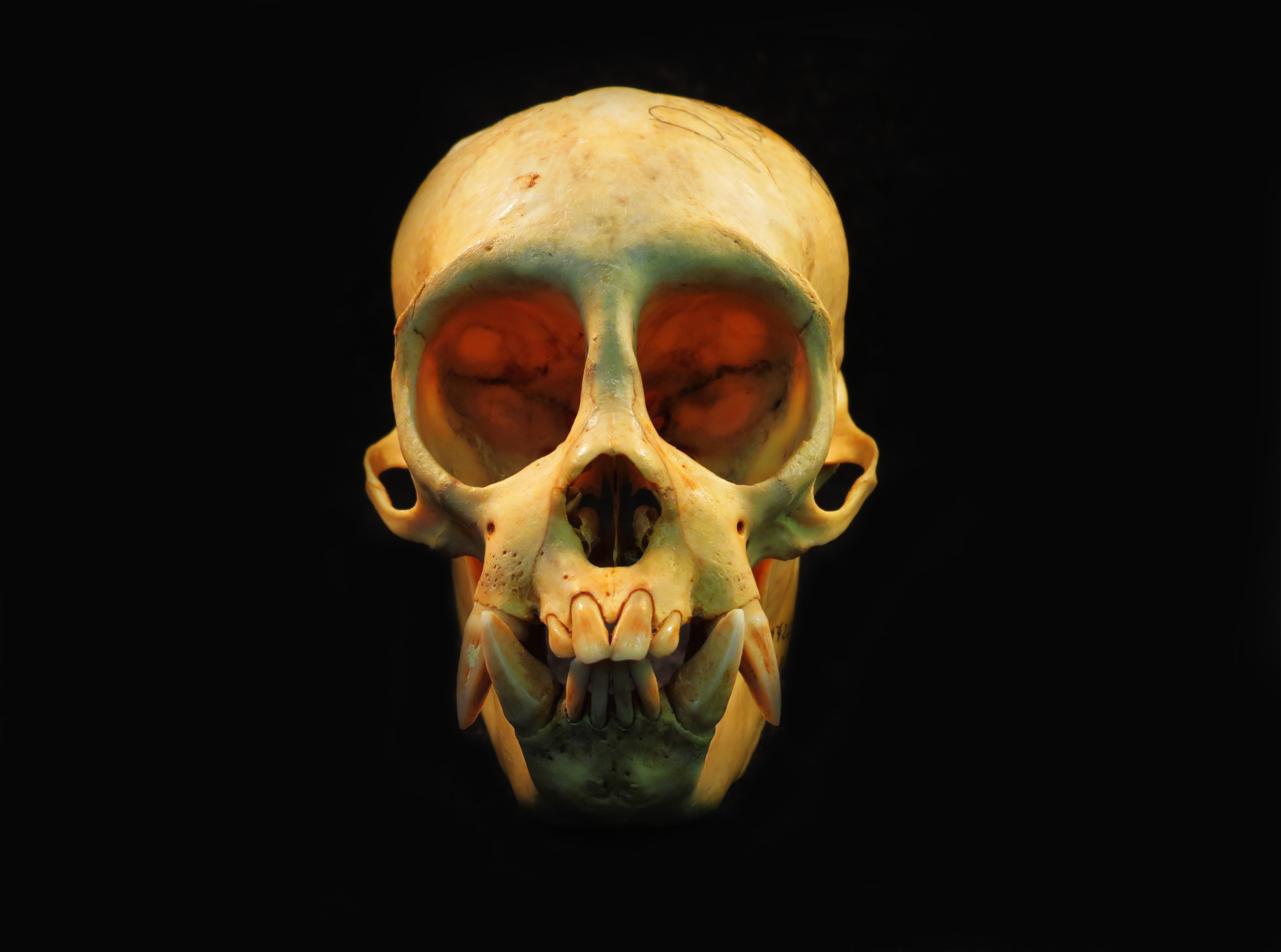
Chiropotes skull showing teeth adaptation for hard seed predation.

The black bearded saki is highly frugivorous, specialized in seed predation, as 90% of their diet comes from fruits and seeds. They use their strong canine teeth to crack open hard shells of fruits and nuts, enabling them to access the unripe seeds inside the fruits. This species feeds mostly on plants of the families Sapotaceae, Lecythidaceae, and Chrysobalanaceae, but it is known to feed on more than 100 species and is able to adapt its diet. These monkeys also eat small insects.

=== Social behavior ===
Saki monkeys are social animals, commonly grooming and playing with one another, even with other primate species. The black bearded saki can be found in troops of 20 to 30 individuals. Individuals of a troop will separate and rejoin throughout the day, have large home ranges, and travel long distances daily.

=== Movement ===
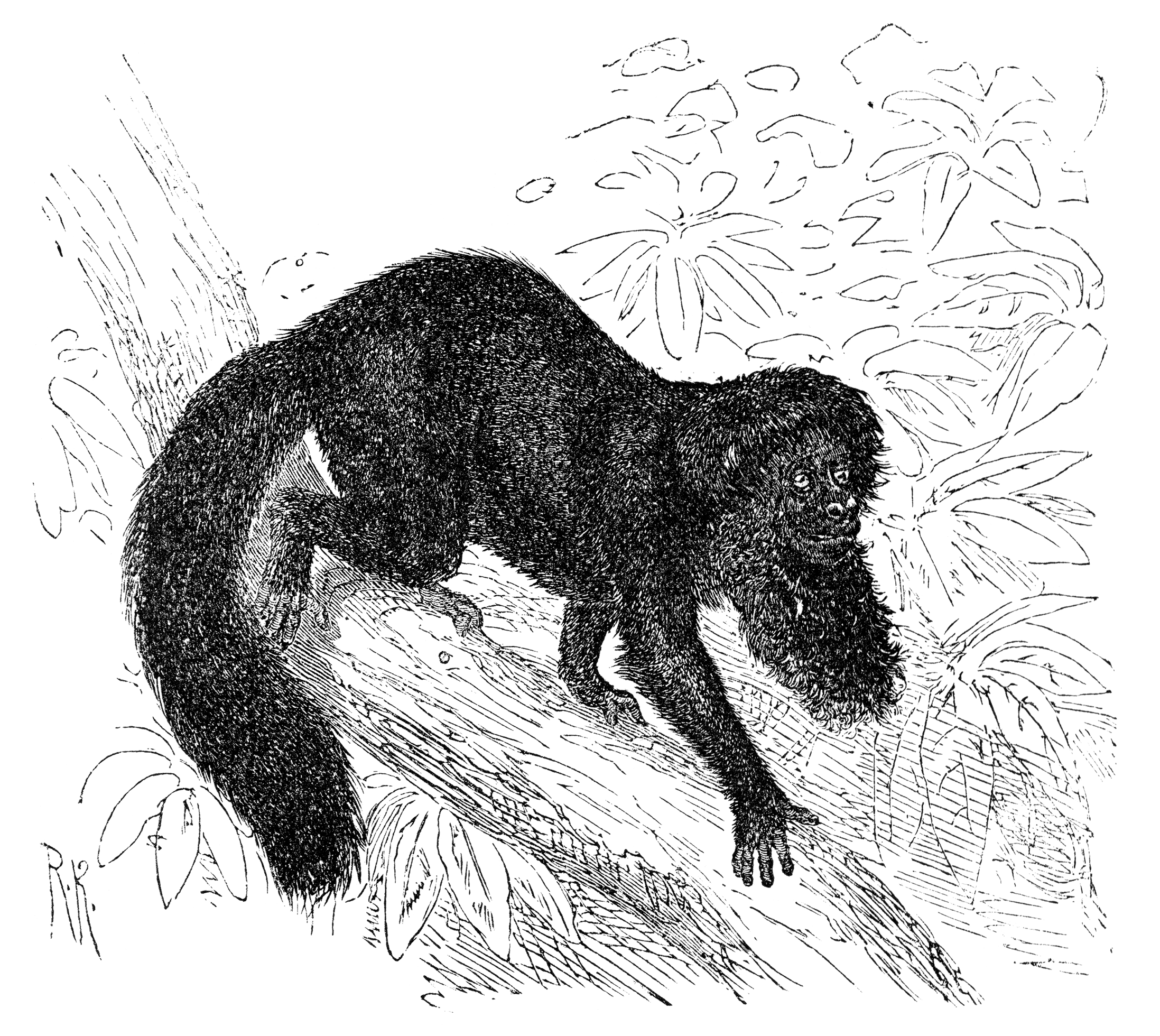
Drawing displaying quadrupedal movement on tree branch.

The black bearded saki spends most of its time resting, traveling and eating. It uses mostly quadrupedal movement to move in the canopy of trees. As infants, the monkey can be seen using its tail to grasp things, but loses the ability as it matures.

=== Reproduction ===
The black bearded saki has a gestation period of 5 months and produces one young at a time. It becomes sexually mature at 4 years old and has an expected lifespan of 18 years. The black bearded saki gives birth to offspring every 2 years.

== Conservation ==
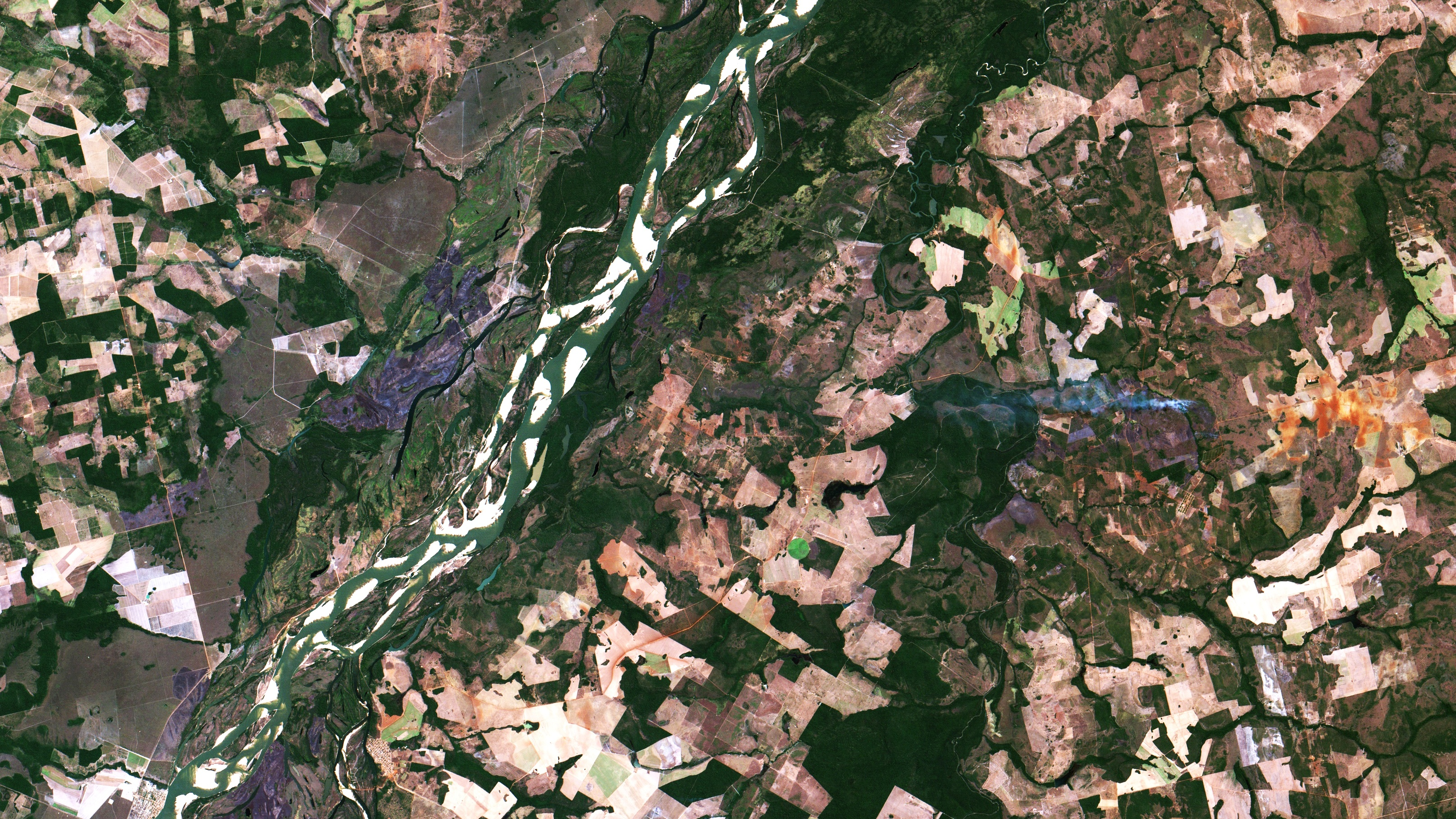
Satellite image showing anthropogenic impact on Araguaia River basin, between Pará e Tocantins

The black bearded saki is an endangered species. Just over the last few decades urbanization in the Brazilian Amazon has brought with it highways, agriculture, and dams, creating an influx of pressures from habitat fragmentation, habitat destruction, and poaching. Habitat fragmentation is rising as secondary roads increase and people move into uninhabited areas of the Amazon rainforest. Along with an influx of people the amount of agriculture required to support the area increases, augmenting the pressure for deforestation.

=== Behavioral modifications due to forest fragmentation ===
Studies reveal that the black bearded saki can adapt to habitat up to 3% the size of its original range. However, it is unclear whether this behavioral flexibility is sufficient for the long-term viability of this species in fragmented habitats. Forest fragmentation has resulted in behavioral changes that allow the species to adapt but could be detrimental for its conservation status in the long run. Black bearded saki groups will not leave isolated patches of fragmented forest unless a bridge of secondary forest grows. Groups in smaller patches of forest will tend to move and vocalize less while resting more. Population density will increase as habitat size decreases, causing a positive tendency in disease among black bearded saki populations living in small patches. This species also faces a hunting problem for bushmeat and their tails used as dusters.

Black bearded sakis living in small forest fragments are limited in their dietary choices because of the reduced number of plant species present, and therefore consume species that those individuals inhabiting continuous forests would ignore. Shifts in feeding patterns occur where fragmentation has been accompanied by selective logging of species used by black bearded sakis as food. The ability to have a flexible diet and include seeds and unripe fruit helps this species survive in smaller forest fragments, but it appears that these conditions are unviable unless connectivity increases among the forest fragments and continuous forest in the landscape. The future survival of the black bearded saki will depend on adequate meta-population and habitat management. Habitat conservation is of top priority as this species has a particularly small range. The black bearded saki is considered the most endangered primate in the Amazon and is already locally extinct in a large portion of its original range.

=== Future survival ===
Studies performed at the Biological Dynamics of Forest Fragments Project study area have recorded the changes in behavior caused in black bearded sakis by habitat fragmentation. Groups of black bearded saki living in 10 ha (25 acres) fragments of isolated rainforest showed a lack of reproduction in a period of 3.5 years. This might be due to a lack of resources in these small isolated fragments of habitat. Smaller fragments of forest also result in higher population densities. The increased density of bearded saki monkeys in the small fragments may affect their health. Higher density groups living in forest fragments are more prone to parasites and disease than those others living in undisturbed areas. It is unknown if the species will be able to reproduce and achieve healthy populations in the smaller patches of fragmented forest they are forced to inhabit.
