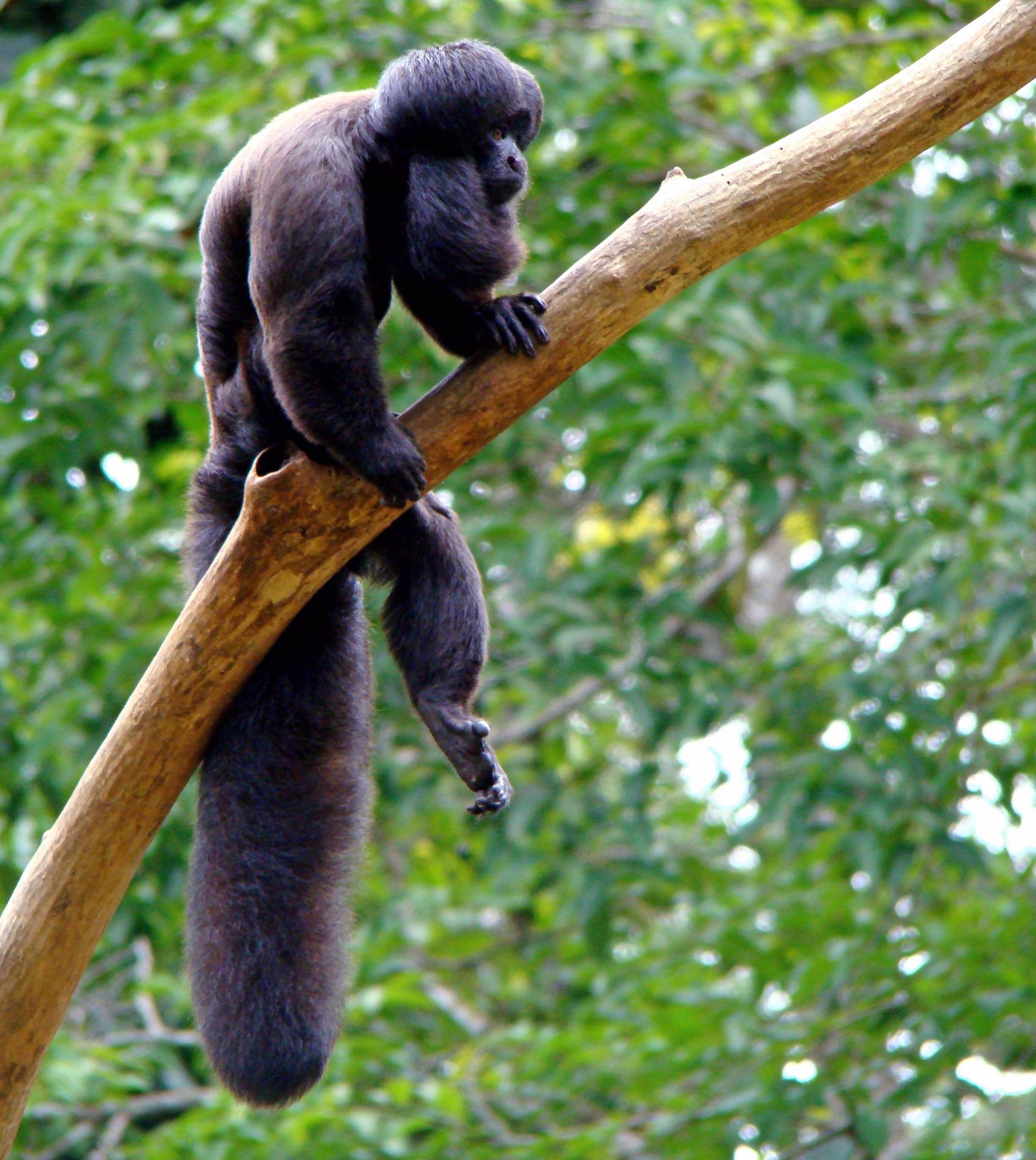

Scientific classification
- Kingdom: Animalia
- Phylum: Chordata
- Class: Mammalia
- Order: Primates
- Family: Pitheciidae
- Subfamily: Pitheciinae
- Genus: Chiropotes; Lesson, 1840

Type species
- Chiropotes satanas Lesson, 1840 ( = Cebus satanas Hoffmannsegg, 1807)

Species
- Chiropotes satanas Chiropotes chiropotes Chiropotes israelita Chiropotes utahickae Chiropotes albinasus Chiropotes sagulatus

= Bearded saki =

Bearded sakis

Genus of New World monkeys

The bearded sakis, or cuxiús, are five or six species of pitheciid New World monkeys, classified in the genus Chiropotes. They live in the eastern and central Amazon in South America, ranging through southern Venezuela, Guyana, Suriname, French Guiana and northern and central Brazil. The species are entirely allopatric, their distributions being separated by major rivers.

Bearded sakis differ from the closely related saki monkeys of the genus Pithecia by a pronounced beard, a tuft of hair that extends from its jaw, down its throat to the top of its chest, and is strongly pronounced particularly in the males. The tail is long and hairy, and is used for balance and not grasping. Bearded sakis reach from 32 to 51 cm (13 to 20 in) in size and a weight from 2 to 4 kg (4.4 to 8.8 lb).

Like many New World monkeys, bearded sakis are diurnal and arboreal. They inhabit tropical rainforests, usually in the crowns of tree. They move on all four by the branches, spending most of the day searching for food. At the night they sleep clasped to thicker branches, never spending successive nights in the same tree. Bearded sakis live together in groups of approximately 18 to 30 animals. Within the group they communicate with bird-like twitter and high whistles. Sometimes they mingle with other primates such as capuchin and squirrel monkeys.

Fruits form the main part of the diet of the bearded sakis, but they also eat nuts, buds, leaves, insects and small vertebrates.

Once a year (usually in early autumn or late summer) the female bears a single offspring after a 5-month gestation. After about three months it begins to explore its environment independently and on it is briefly cured. Bearded sakis reach full maturity at 4 years of age. Their life expectancy is approximately 15 years.

Bearded sakis are highly sensitive to hunting and habitat destruction. Consequently, two of the five species recognized by IUCN (they do not recognize C. israelita, but do recognize C. sagulatus) are considered at least vulnerable, with C. satanas being endangered.

The genus name Chiropotes comes from Ancient Greek χείρ (kheír), meaning "hand", and ποτης (potēs), meaning "drinker", as the type species was observed immersing their hands in water and then bringing them to their mouth to drink. This behaviour was later found to be widespread among monkey species and not a distinguishing feature of this genus.

== Classification ==
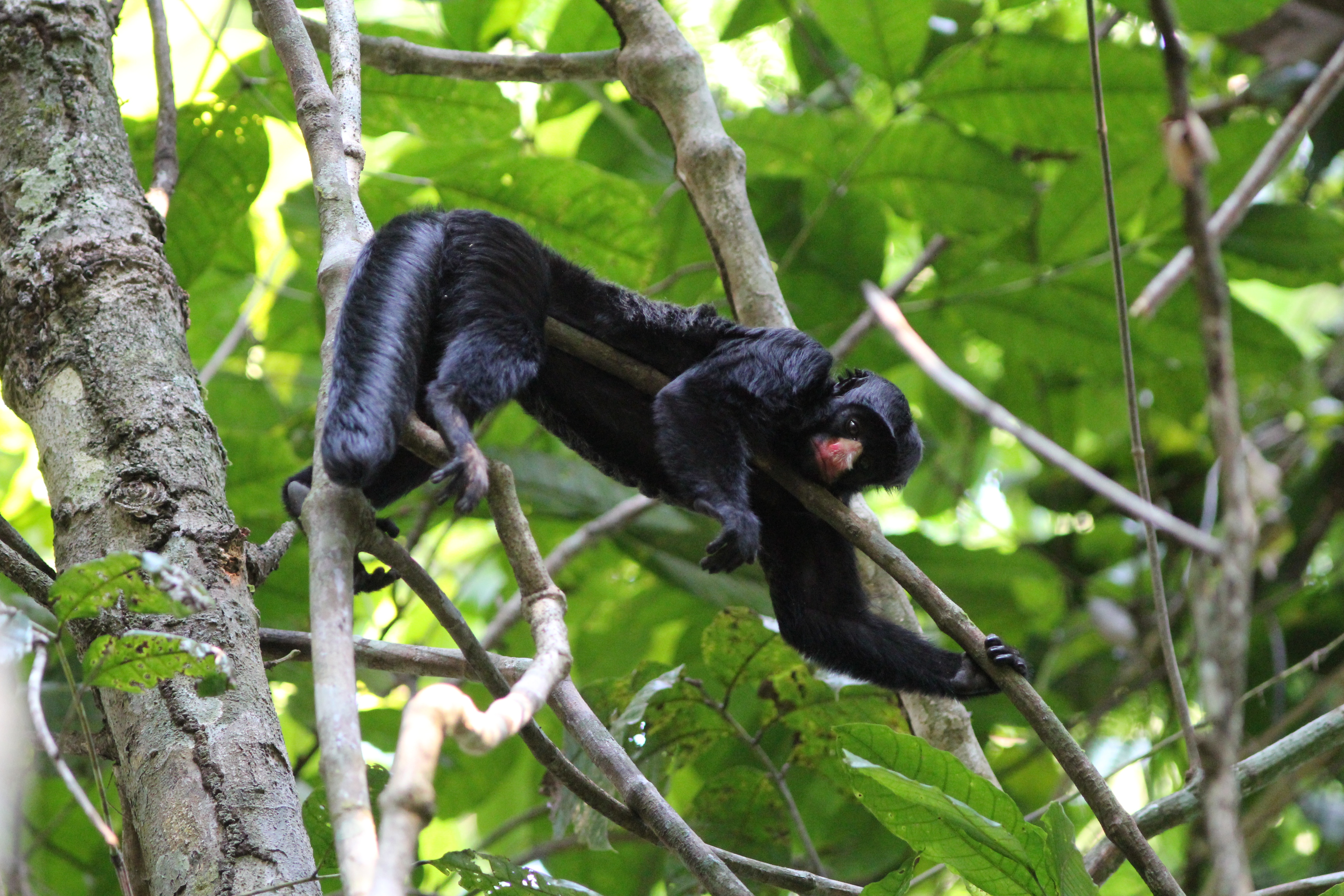
White-nosed saki (Chiropotes albinasus).

Until recently, only two species were recognized in this genus, but C. israelita was re-validated in 2003 (having long been considered a synonym of Chiropotes), where it – based on differences in colour of pelage, karyotype, and molecular analysis – also was recommended treating C. chiropotes and C. utahickae as species separate from C. satanas. The IUCN note the taxonomic confusion, but lists C. sagulatus as a valid species, with C. israelita as a synonym.

- Genus Chiropotes
  - Black bearded saki, Chiropotes satanas
  - Red-backed bearded saki, Chiropotes chiropotes
  - Brown-backed bearded saki, Chiropotes israelita
  - Uta Hick's bearded saki, Chiropotes utahicki
  - White-nosed saki, Chiropotes albinasus
  - Reddish-brown bearded saki, Chiropotes sagulatus
