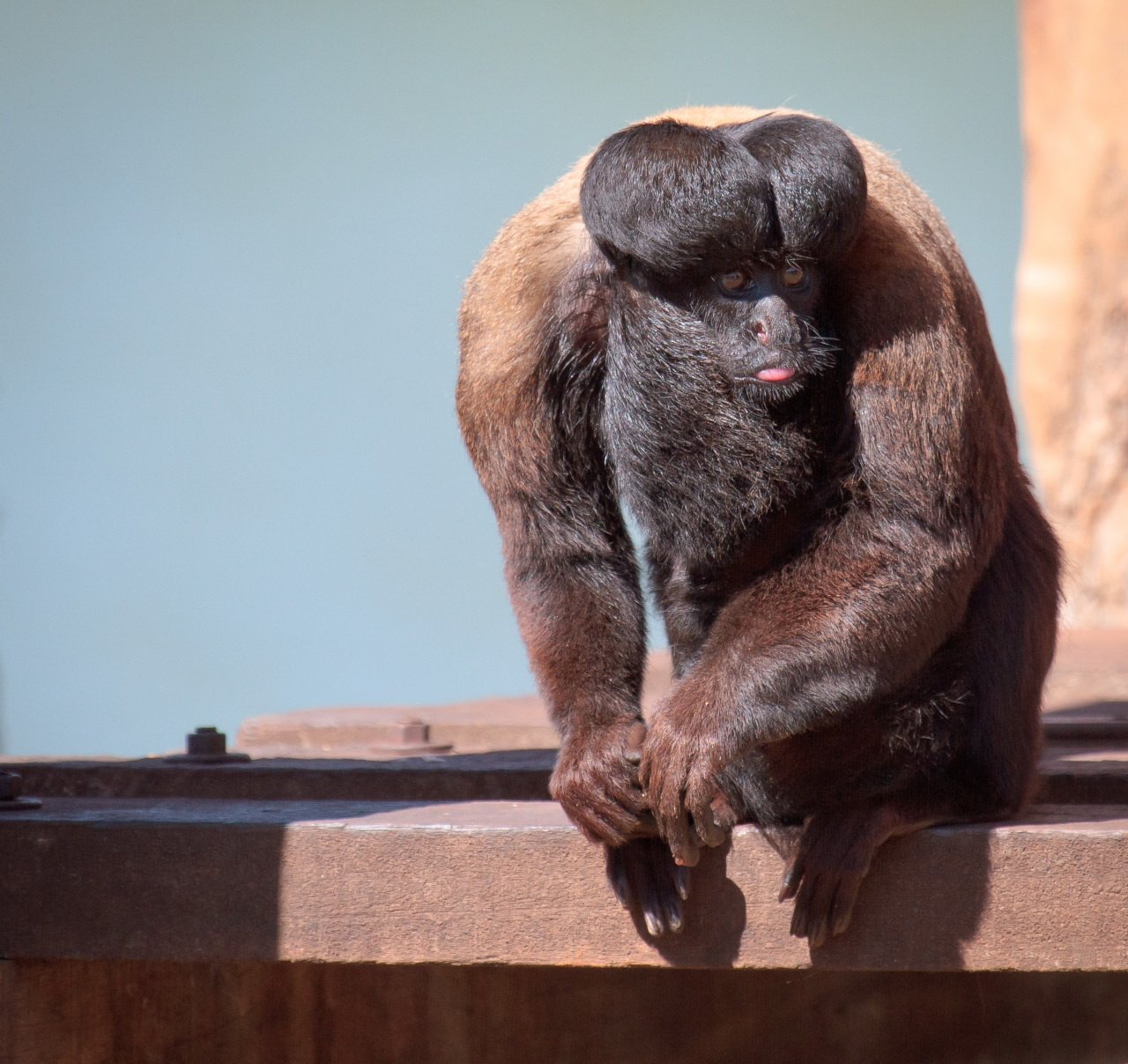

Conservation status
- Endangered (IUCN 3.1)

Scientific classification
- Kingdom: Animalia
- Phylum: Chordata
- Class: Mammalia
- Infraclass: Placentalia
- Order: Primates
- Family: Pitheciidae
- Genus: Chiropotes
- Species: C. utahicki

Binomial name
- Chiropotes utahicki Hershkovitz, 1985
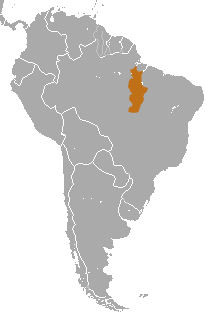
- Uta Hick's bearded saki range

= Uta Hick's bearded saki =

Species of New World monkey

Uta Hick's bearded saki (Chiropotes utahicki) is an endangered species of bearded saki, a type of New World monkey. It is endemic to Brazil, where restricted to the Amazon between the Xingu and Tocantins Rivers. It was formerly treated as a subspecies of the more easterly C. satanas, but its back is pale brownish.

== Etymology ==
Its vernacular and specific name were made in honor of Uta Hick, a German primatologist who cared for bearded sakis at the Cologne Zoo. In the 1980s, she was the first person who could successfully keep captive bearded sakis. Her married name is Uta Rümpler.

The specific name utahicki is often corrected to utahickae, as -ae is the appropriate suffix for the genitive of a woman honoree's name (meaning "Uta Hick's") according to ICZN rules. Even though -i technically indicates a male honoree, some sources discourage modifying the earlier utahicki, because there is no official way to make such corrections under the current (1999) ICZN.
