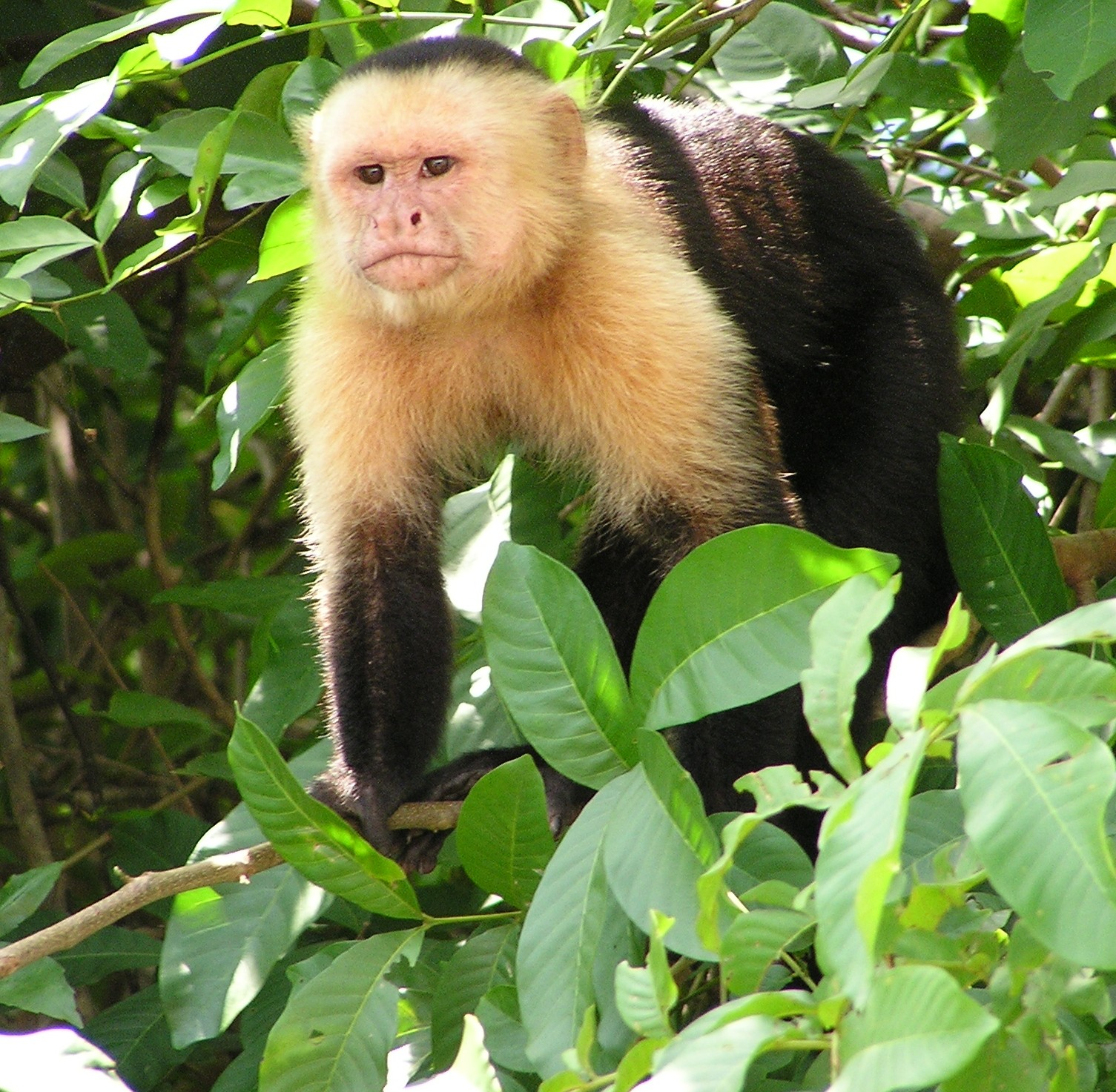
- Panamanian white-faced capuchin (Cebus imitator) on a tree near a river bank in the jungles of Guanacaste, Costa Rica

Scientific classification
- Kingdom: Animalia
- Phylum: Chordata
- Class: Mammalia
- Order: Primates
- Family: Cebidae
- Subfamily: Cebinae; Bonaparte, 1831

Genera
- Cebus; Sapajus

= Capuchin monkey =

Capuchin monkey Temporal range: 6.2–0 Ma Late Miocene-Present

Subfamily of New World monkeys

The capuchin monkeys (/ˈkæp(j)ʊtʃɪn, -ʃɪn/) are New World monkeys of the subfamily Cebinae. They are famous for their complex foraging skills, such as tool use to crack open nuts. As neotropical primates, their distribution includes tropical forests in Central America and South America as far south as northern Argentina. The highest number is found in Brazil, where they are known as nail monkey (macaco-prego), a common name derived from the nail-like shape of the male genitalia in Brazilian Portuguese. In Central America, they are called white-faced monkeys (carablanca) in Spanish, where they usually occupy the wet lowland forests on the Caribbean coast of Costa Rica and Panama and deciduous dry forest on the Pacific coast. Capuchins have the largest brain-to-body ratio of any nonhuman primate, as well as complex brain wiring. Their neural complexity is likely related to their sociality and advanced foraging skills. Capuchins have evolved skills to access food that other monkeys cannot and to mentally map food sources in their territories. They are also frequent victims of illegal wildlife trafficking, which is increasing.

== Etymology ==
The word capuchin derives from the Order of Friars Minor Capuchin, who wear brown robes with large hoods. When Portuguese explorers reached the Americas in the 15th century, they found small monkeys whose coloring resembled these friars, especially when in their robes with hoods down, and named them capuchins. When the scientists described a specimen (thought to be a golden-bellied capuchin) they noted that: "his muzzle of a tanned color, ... with the lighter color around his eyes that melts into the white at the front, his cheeks ... give him the looks that involuntarily reminds us of the appearance that historically in our country represents ignorance, laziness, and sensuality." The scientific name of the genus, Cebus comes from the Greek word κῆβος (kêbos), meaning a long-tailed monkey.

== Classification ==
The species-level taxonomy of this subfamily remains highly controversial, and alternative treatments than the one listed below have been suggested.

In 2011, Jessica Lynch Alfaro et al. proposed that the robust capuchins (formerly the C. apella group) be placed in a separate genus, Sapajus, from the gracile capuchins (formerly the C. capucinus group) which retain the genus Cebus. Other primatologists, such as Paul Garber, have begun using this classification.

According to genetic studies led by Lynch Alfaro in 2011, the gracile and robust capuchins diverged approximately 6.2 million years ago. Lynch Alfaro suspects that the divergence was triggered by the creation of the Amazon River, which separated the monkeys in the Amazon north of the Amazon River, who then evolved into the gracile capuchins (Cebus). Those in the Atlantic Forest south of the river evolved into the robust capuchins (Sapajus). Gracile capuchins have longer limbs relative to their body size than robust capuchins, and have rounder skulls, whereas robust capuchins have jaws better adapted for opening hard nuts. Robust capuchins have crests and the males have beards.

- Genus Cebus
  - Colombian white-faced capuchin or Colombian white-headed capuchin, Cebus capucinus
  - Panamanian white-faced capuchin or Panamanian white-headed capuchin, Cebus imitator
  - Marañón white-fronted capuchin, Cebus yuracus
  - Shock-headed capuchin, Cebus cuscinus
  - Spix's white-fronted capuchin, Cebus unicolor
  - Humboldt's white-fronted capuchin, Cebus albifrons
  - Guianan weeper capuchin, Cebus olivaceus
  - Chestnut weeper capuchin, Cebus castaneus
  - Ka'apor capuchin, Cebus kaapori
  - Venezuelan brown capuchin, Cebus brunneus
  - Sierra de Perijá white-fronted capuchin, Cebus leucocephalus
  - Río Cesar white-fronted capuchin, Cebus cesare
  - Varied white-fronted capuchin, Cebus versicolor
  - Santa Marta white-fronted capuchin, Cebus malitiosus
  - Ecuadorian white-fronted capuchin, Cebus aequatorialis

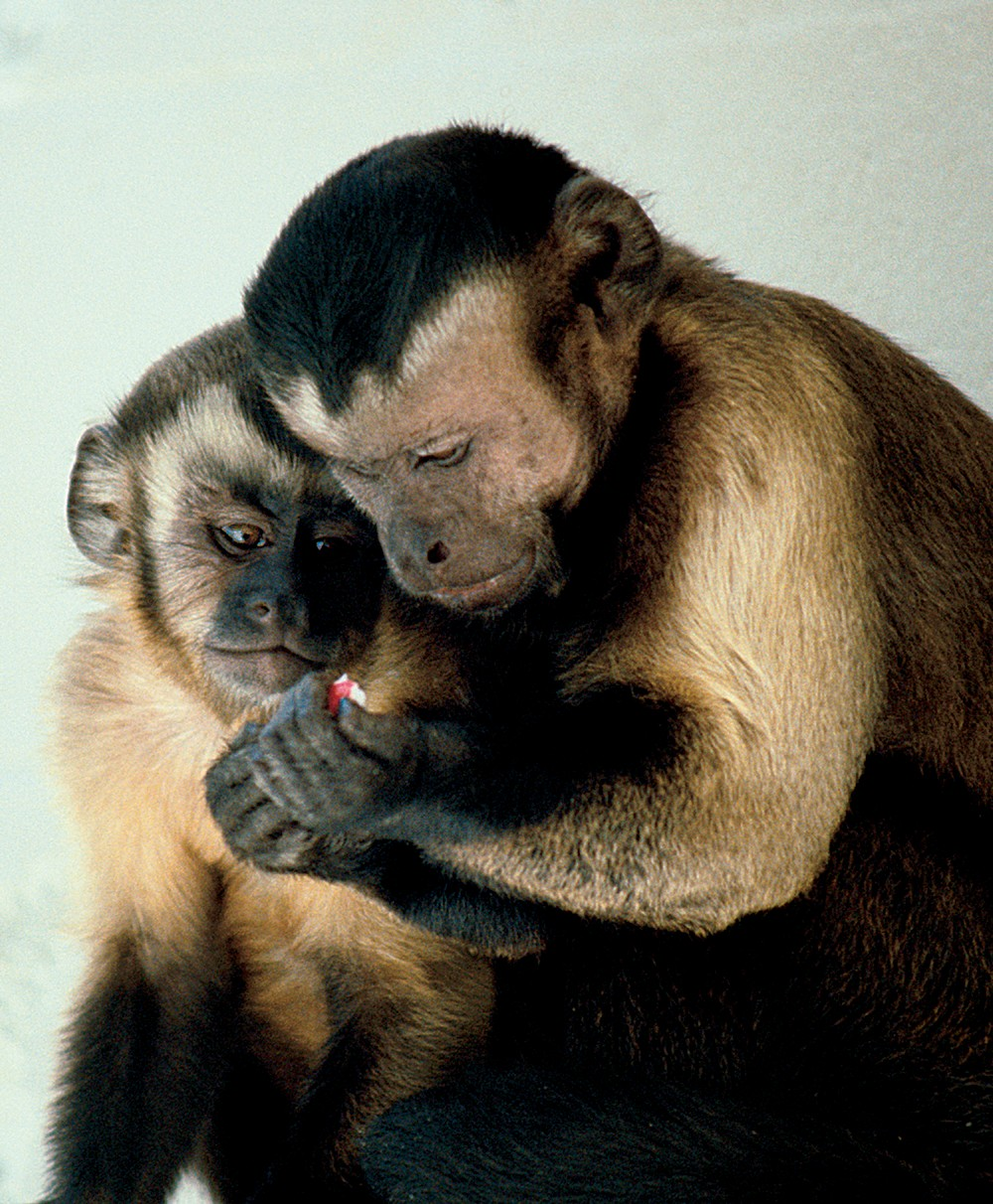
Tufted capuchin (Sapajus apella)

- Genus Sapajus
  - Black-capped, brown or tufted capuchin, Sapajus apella
    - Guiana brown capuchin, Sapajus apella apella
    - Sapajus apella fatuellus
    - Large-headed capuchin, Sapajus apella macrocephalus
    - Margarita Island capuchin, Sapajus apella margaritae
    - Sapajus apella peruanus
    - Sapajus apella tocantinus
  - Blond capuchin, Sapajus flavius*
  - Black-striped capuchin, Sapajus libidinosus
    - Sapajus libidinosus juruanus
    - Sapajus libidinosus libidinosus
    - Sapajus libidinosus pallidus
    - Sapajus libidinosus paraguayanus
  - Azaras's capuchin, Sapajus cay
  - Black capuchin, Sapajus nigritus
    - Sapajus nigritus cucullatus
    - Sapajus nigritus nigritus
  - Crested capuchin or robust tufted capuchin, Sapajus robustus
  - Golden-bellied capuchin, Sapajus xanthosternos

* Rediscovered species.

The oldest known crown platyrrhine and member of Cebidae, Panamacebus transitus, is estimated to have lived 21 million years ago. It is the earliest known fossil evidence of a mammal travelling between South and North America.

== Physical characteristics ==
Capuchins are black, brown, buff or whitish, but their exact color and pattern depends on the species involved. Capuchin monkeys are usually dark brown with a cream/off-white coloring around their necks. They reach a length of 30 to 56 cm (12 to 22 in), with tails that are just as long as the body. On average, they weigh from 1.4 to 4 kg (3 to 9 pounds) and live up to 25 years old in their natural habitats, and up to 35 in captivity.

== Habitat and distribution ==
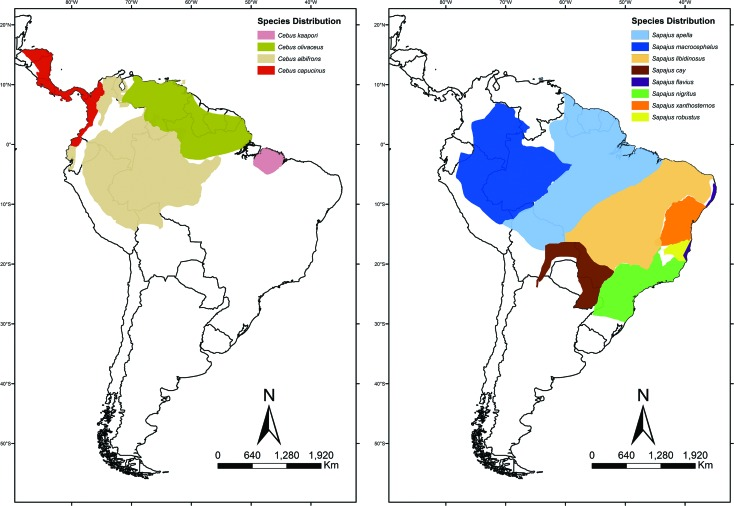
Geographical distribution of robust (Sapajus) on the right and gracile (Cebus) on the left. Map constructed based on information provided by Silva Jr (2001), Lynch Alfaro et al. (2012), and IUCN (2016).

They are particularly abundant in Argentina, Brazil, Costa Rica, Honduras, Paraguay, and Peru. But Brazil is the country with the highest abundance of capuchin monkeys, considered the evolutionary start for the robust capuchin genus (Sapajus). Capuchins prefer environments that give them access to shelter and easy food, such as low-lying forests, mountain forests, and rainforests. They use these areas for shelter at night and food access during the day. The canopy of the trees provides protection from threats above, and the capuchin monkeys' innate ability to climb trees with ease allows them to escape and hide from predators on the jungle floor. This environment is mutually beneficial for the capuchins and for the ecosystem in which they inhabit. This is because they spread their seed leftovers and fecal matter across the forest floor which helps new plants to grow, therefore adding to the already abundant foliage that shelters the capuchin.

== Behavior ==
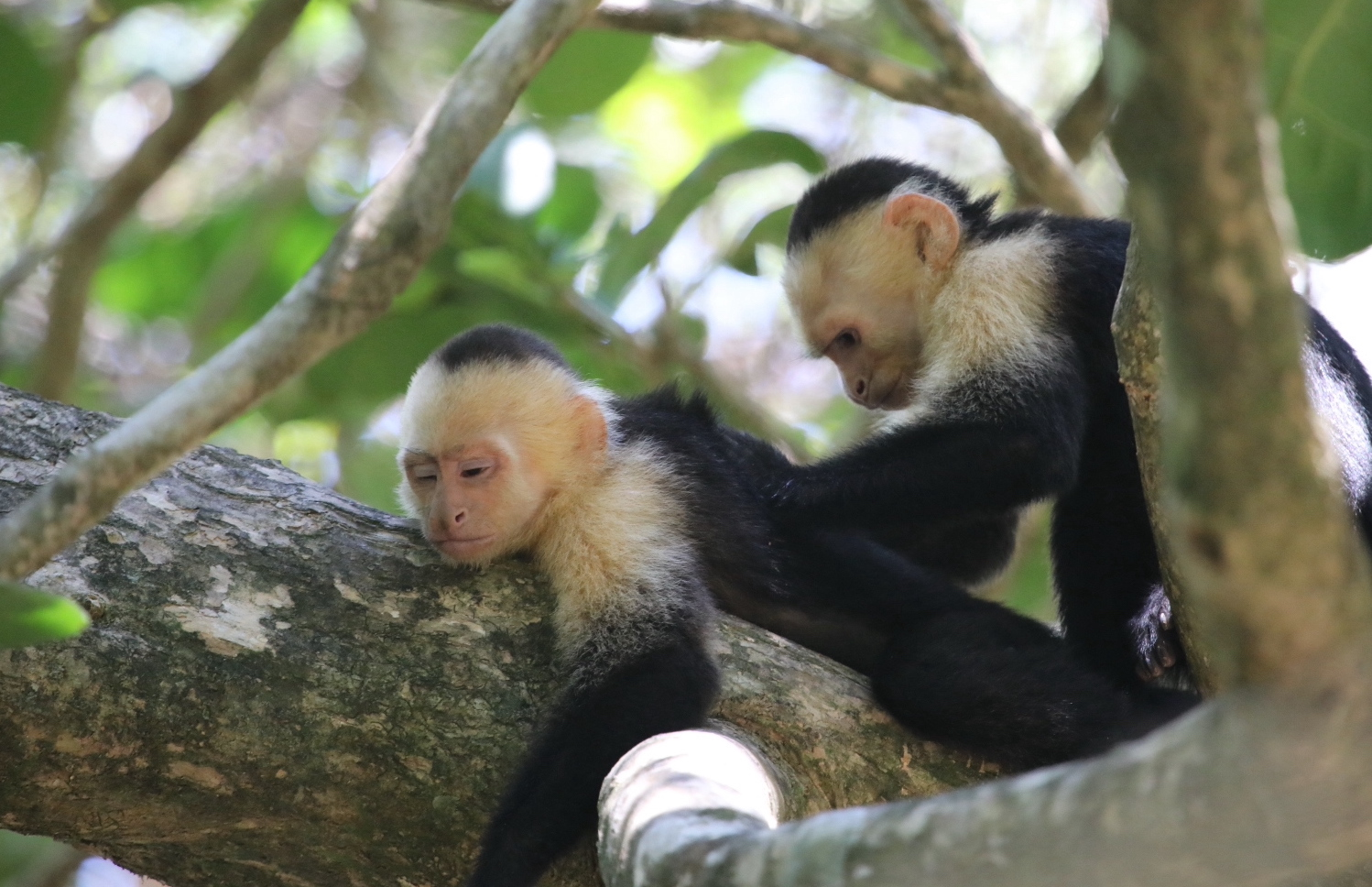
White-faced capuchins doing allogrooming, a behavior that helps maintain hygiene and social bonds

Like most New World monkeys, capuchins are diurnal and arboreal. Capuchins are polygamous, and the females mate throughout the year, but only go through a gestation period once every 2 years between December and April. Females bear young every two years following a 160- to 180-day gestation. The young cling to their mother's chest until they are larger, then they move to her back. Adult male capuchin rarely take part in caring for the young. Juveniles become fully mature within four years for females and eight years for males. In captivity, individuals have reached an age of 50 years, although natural life expectancy is only 15 to 25 years. Capuchins live in groups of 6–40 members, consisting of related females, their offspring, and several males.

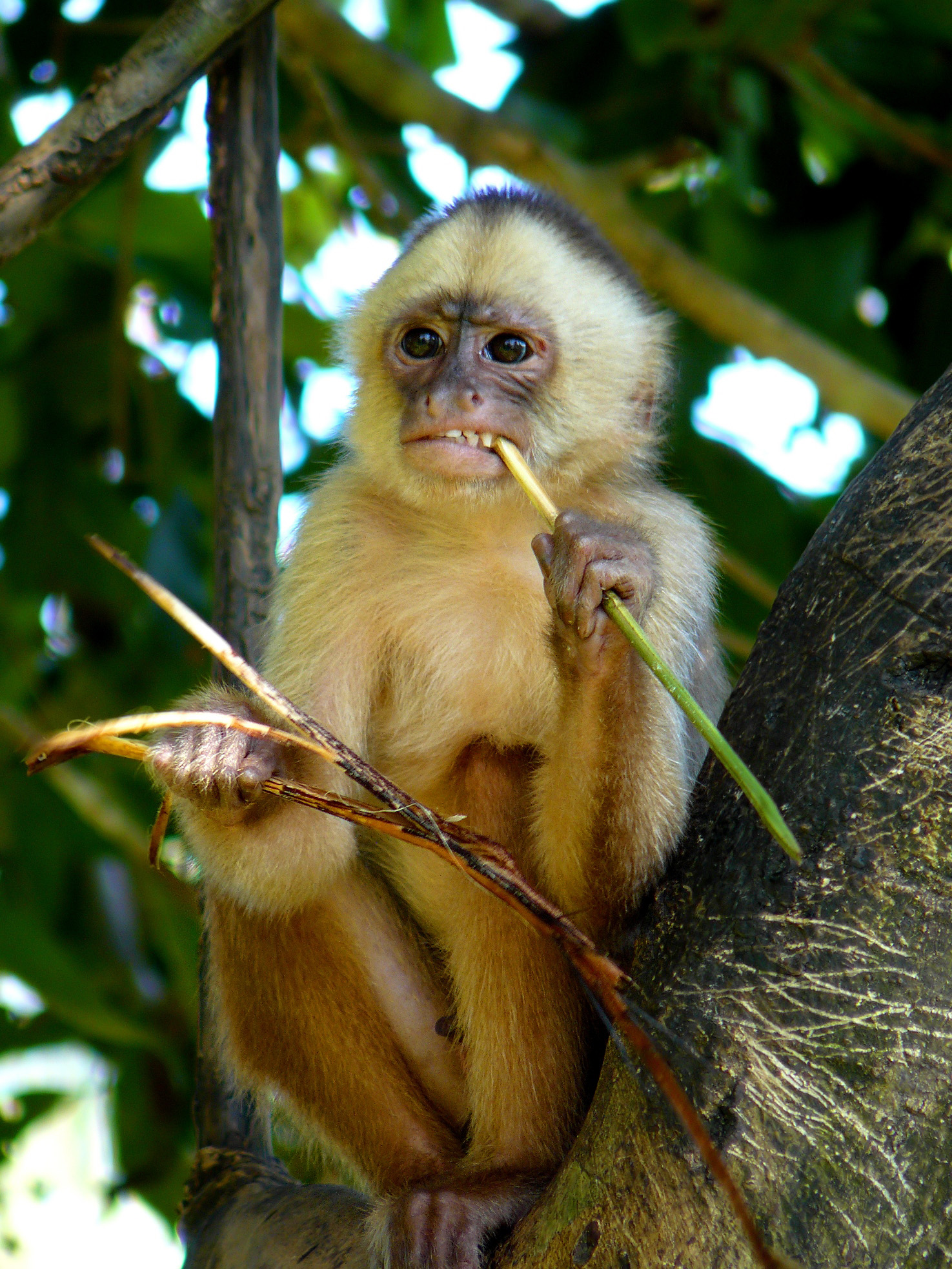
White-fronted capuchin (Cebus albifrons)

=== Diet ===
The capuchin monkey feeds on a vast range of food types, and is more varied than other monkeys in the family Cebidae. They are omnivores, and consume a variety of plant parts such as leaves, flower and fruit, seeds, pith, woody tissue, sugarcane, bulb, and exudates, as well as arthropods, molluscs, a variety of vertebrates, and even primates. Recent findings of old stone tools in Capuchin habitats have suggested that recently the Capuchins have switched from small nuts, such as cashews, to larger and harder nuts. Capuchins have also been observed to be particularly good at catching frogs. They are characterized as innovative and extreme foragers because of their ability to acquire sustenance from a wide collection of unlikely food, which may assure their survival in habitats with extreme food limitation. Capuchins living near water will also eat crabs and shellfish by cracking their shells with stones.

==== Tool Use ====
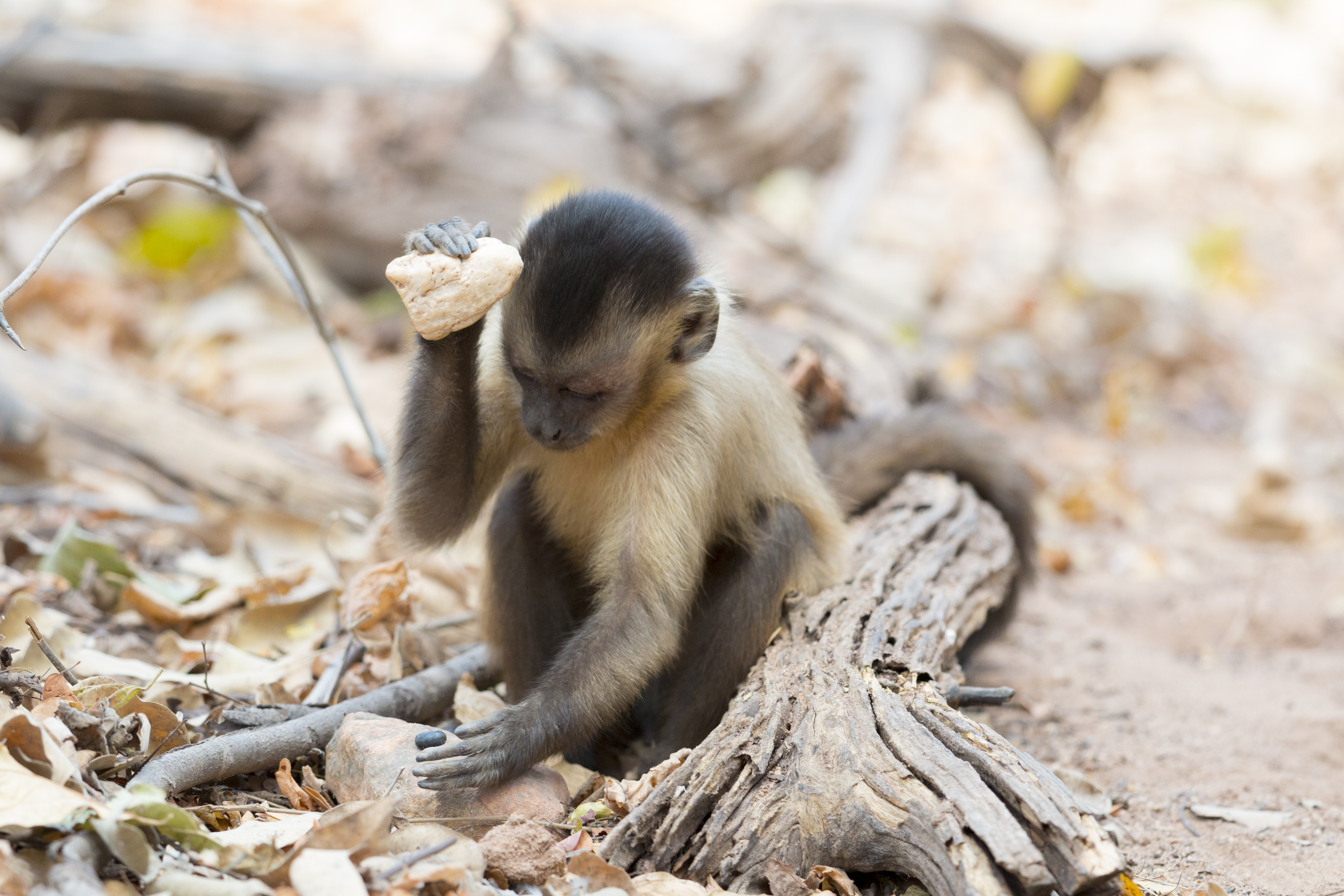
A juvenile capuchin monkey (Sapajus libidinosus) using a stone as a tool to open a seed. Author: Tiago Falótico

Capuchin monkeys are the only neotropical primates that frequently use tools in the wild. Their foraging behavior repertoire includes the use of rocks as both hammers and anvils to open fruits and nuts. This behavior varies in complexity, from smashing a fruit against a hard surface to the more complex action of positioning a nut on a flat stone and striking it with a heavier rock (as a hammer and an anvil). In natural habitats, mastering these skills is a gradual process that can take years of learning and practice because it is a socially learned skill, this means they learn by observing their coespecifics. They also actively choose hammer stones of specific weights and sizes depending on the type of food they intend to open. In 2019, archaeological excavations in Brazil revealed that some wild capuchin populations have maintained this stone-tool culture for at least 3,000 years, considered today one of the oldest known records of non-human material culture.

=== Social structure ===
Capuchin monkeys often live in large groups of 10 to 35 individuals within the forest, although they can easily adapt to places colonized by humans. The Capuchins have discrete hierarchies that are distinguished by age and sex. Usually, a single male will dominate the group, and he will have primary rights to mate with the females of the group. However, the white-headed capuchin groups are led by both an alpha male and an alpha female. Each group will cover a large territory, since members must search for the best areas to feed. These primates are territorial animals, distinctly marking a central area of their territory with urine and defending it against intruders, though outer areas may overlap. The stabilization of group dynamics is served through mutual grooming, and communication occurs between the monkeys through various calls. Their vocal communications have various meanings such as creating contact with one another, warning about a predator, and forming new groups. The social experience of the capuchins directly influences the development of attention in society. They create new social behaviors within multiple groups that signify different types of interactions. These include; tests of friendship, displays against enemies, infant and sexual intimacy. This creates social rituals that are designed to test the strength of social bonds and a reliance on social learning.

=== Mating ===
Capuchin females often direct most of their proceptive and mating behavior towards the alpha male. However, when the female reaches the end of her proceptive period, she may sometimes mate with up to six different subordinate males in one day. Strictly targeting the alpha male does not happen every time, as some females have been observed to mate with three to four different males. When an alpha female and a lower-ranking female want to mate with an alpha male, the more dominant female will get rights to the male over the lower-ranking one.

=== Sleeping ===
Capuchins generally prefer to nest in tall, emergent trees with many horizontal branches. They tend to sleep away from the trunk to avoid arboreal predators. The number of sleeping sites and how consistently they use them varies across groups and species, though capuchins commonly switch sites nightly.

== Intelligence ==
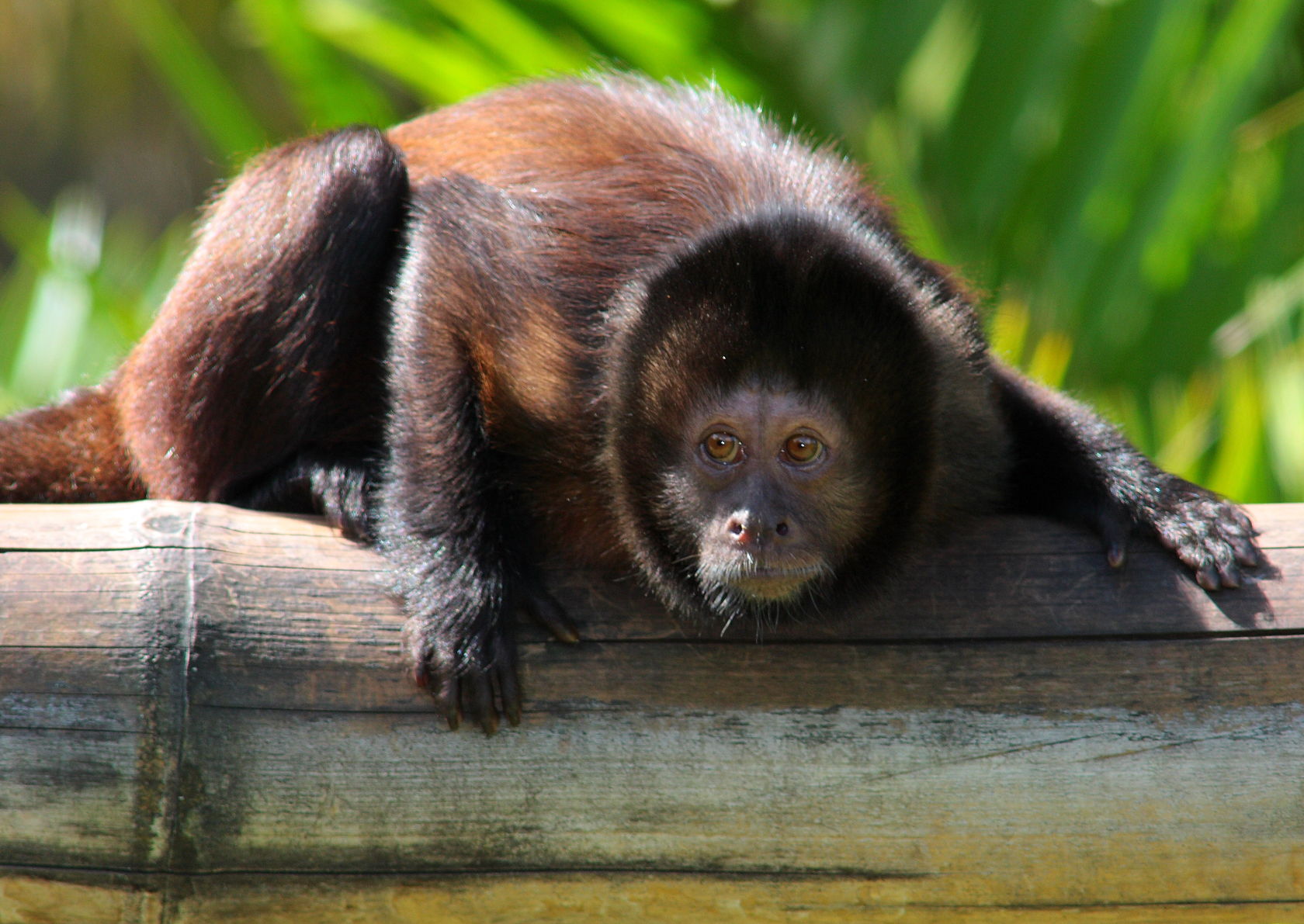
Crested capuchin (Sapajus robustus)

The capuchin is considered to be the most intelligent New World monkey and is often kept in captivity. The tufted monkey is especially noted for its long-term tool usage, one of the few examples of primate tool use other than by apes including humans. Upon seeing macaws eating palm nuts, cracking them open with their beaks, this monkey will select a few of the ripest fruits, nip off the tip of the fruit and drink down the juice, then seemingly discard the rest of the fruit with the nut inside. When these discarded fruits have hardened and become slightly brittle, the capuchin will gather them up again and take them to a large flat boulder where they have previously gathered a few river stones from up to a mile away. They will then use these stones, some of them weighing as much as the monkeys, to crack open the fruit to get to the nut inside.

In 2005, experiments were conducted on the ability of capuchins to use money. After several months of training, the monkeys began exhibiting behaviors considered to reflect an understanding of the concept of a medium of exchange that were previously believed to be restricted to humans (such as responding rationally to price shocks). They showed the same propensity to avoid perceived losses demonstrated by human subjects and investors.

During the mosquito season, they crush millipedes and rub the result on their backs. This acts as a natural insect repellent serving as self-medication during this season while also facilitating social bonding.

=== Individual differences and learning ===
Capuchin monkeys have a high neocortical ratio, which gives them impressive behavioral flexibility and developed motor skills. That's why they are frequently used as models in cognitive and neuroscience research.

Just like humans and other primates, capuchins show individual differences that can be measured in different behavioral axes, often known as personality traits, based on the major dimensions used for both humans and other primates. These axes parallel the Big Five personality traits (openness, conscientiousness, extraversion, agreeableness, and neuroticism), most commonly used in human psychology. A monkey's personality traits can affect how they interact with everything. These traits, such as Assertiveness, have a significant influence on how individuals interact with their environment, cope with stress, and respond to cognitive challenges. Recent research in animal cognition indicates that assertiveness is a good predictor of participation and learning success during complex tasks. This means that highly assertive monkeys tend to be more curious, more willing to approach new things, and learn new tasks faster, compared with less assertive monkeys.

Apart from individual learning, capuchins depend on social learning to develop these complex skills. During their development, young monkeys observe experienced or dominant adults, allowing specific behavioral traditions to be passed through generations. However, the success of this observational learning will vary depending on the context. For example, studies show that if a food reward is placed too far away from the demonstration, the monkeys can lose focus and are less likely to copy the behavior.

=== Self-awareness ===
When presented with a reflection, capuchin monkeys react in a way that indicates an intermediate state between seeing the mirror as another individual and recognizing the image as self.

Most animals react to seeing their reflections as if encountering another individual they do not recognize. An experiment with capuchins shows that they react to a reflection as a strange phenomenon, but not as if seeing a strange capuchin.

In the experiment, capuchins were presented with three different scenarios:

1. Seeing an unfamiliar, same-sex monkey on the other side of a clear barrier.
2. Seeing a familiar, same-sex monkey on the other side of a clear barrier.
3. A mirror showing a reflection of the monkey.

In scenario 1, females appeared anxious and avoided eye-contact, while males made threatening gestures. In scenario 2, there was little reaction by either males or females.

When presented with a reflection, females gazed into their own eyes and made friendly gestures, such as lip-smacking and swaying. Males made more eye contact than with strangers or familiar monkeys but reacted with signs of confusion or distress, such as squealing, curling up on the floor, or trying to escape from the test room.

=== Theory of mind ===
The question of whether capuchin monkeys have a theory of mind—whether they can understand what another creature may know or think—has been neither proven nor disproven conclusively. If confronted with a knower-guesser scenario, where one trainer can be observed to know the location of food and another trainer merely guesses the location of food, capuchin monkeys can learn to rely on the knower. This has, however, been repudiated as conclusive evidence for a theory of mind as the monkeys may have learned to discriminate knower and guess by other means. Until recently it was believed that non-human great apes did not possess a theory of mind either, although recent research indicates this may not be correct. Human children commonly develop a theory of mind around the ages 3 and 4.

== Threats ==
Capuchin monkeys are threatened by deforestation, the pet trade, and humans hunting for bushmeat. According to the IUCN Red List of Threatened Species, nearly all species are decreasing in population, with many facing threats of extinction. Since capuchins have a high reproductive rate and can adapt to different living environments, they can survive forest loss more than some other species; however, habitat fragmentation is still a threat. Predators include jaguars, cougars, jaguarundis, coyotes, tayras, snakes, crocodiles, birds of prey, and humans. The main predator of the tufted capuchin is the harpy eagle, which has been seen bringing several capuchin back to its nest.

=== Indirect threats ===
The growth of wildlife social media content has emerged as an important indirect threat to the conservation of capuchin monkeys. That's because new studies analyzing social media indicate that a large portion of images of capuchins on platforms like Instagram show them as pets rather than wild animals. This content often presents "humanized" monkeys wearing clothes or using diapers, and this can create a distorted perception that these primates are suitable as pets due to anthropomorphism.

These studies have also demonstrated a clear association between the humanization (anthropomorphism) of capuchins on social media and an increase in public desire to have them as pets, and this could be influencing the illegal capture and trafficking, stimulating the illegal trade. For example, in Brazil capuchin monkeys are already the most frequently illegally commercialized wild animals. The way they appear on the internet also masks the species' true conservation status and the numerous ethical issues related to their captivity.

== Relationship with humans ==
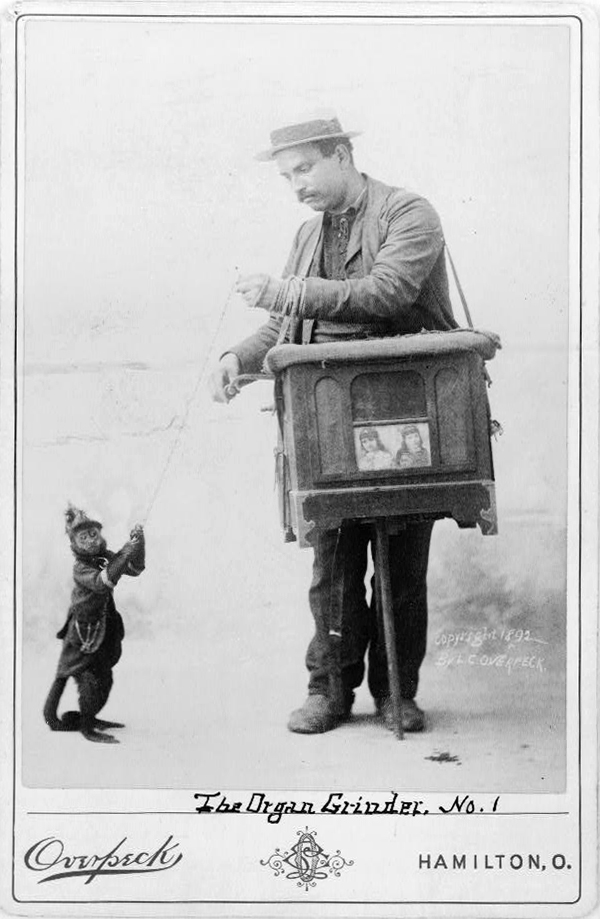
19th-century organ grinder and his capuchin monkey

Capuchin monkeys have a long history in entertainment and being kept as pets, mostly illegally. Because of their very expressive faces, people easily connect with them, making them very popular in general, and more recently on social media, mostly in anthropomorphized environments. While living close to humans makes capuchins familiar and appealing, it often encourages utilitarian views (where the monkeys are seen as objects for human use) and dominion-oriented views (the belief that humans have the right to control them).

This long history of human contact helped normalize the idea of keeping them in captivity. As a result, this masks that capuchins are wild primates with complex ecological and welfare needs, treating them simply as pets. This reflects on the capuchin monkey's relationship with humans throughout history.

Starting in 1979, Helping Hands, a nonprofit organization based in Boston, tried to train capuchin monkeys to assist quadriplegics as monkey helpers in a manner similar to mobility assistance dogs. However, unlike dogs, monkeys are wild animals; thus, they needed to have all of their teeth pulled and wear belts that could administer shocks to make them cope.

In 2010, the U.S. federal government revised its definition of service animal under the Americans with Disabilities Act (ADA). Nonhuman primates and other exotic animals were no longer recognized as service animals under the ADA. The American Veterinary Medical Association does not support the use of nonhuman primates as assistance animals because of animal welfare concerns, the potential for serious injury to people, and risks that primates may transfer dangerous diseases to humans. In 2021, Helping Hands (the organization that provided helper monkeys to disabled persons) rebranded, changing its name to Envisioning Access and replaced the use of monkeys with a focus on new assistive technologies.

Capuchin monkeys are the most common featured monkeys in film and television, with notable examples including: Night at the Museum (and its sequels), Outbreak, Monkey Shines, Pirates of the Caribbean: The Curse of the Black Pearl (and its sequels), Zookeeper, George of the Jungle, and The Hangover Part II. Ross Geller (David Schwimmer) on the NBC sitcom Friends had a capuchin monkey named Marcel. Ace Ventura (Jim Carrey) in the first two Ace Ventura films had a capuchin named Spike. Crystal the Monkey is a famous monkey actress, a female of the species Sapajus apella, she has appeared in more than 30 productions.

== See also ==
- New World monkey
- Sapajus
- Cebus
- Primate cognition
- Wildlife trafficking
- IUCN Red List
