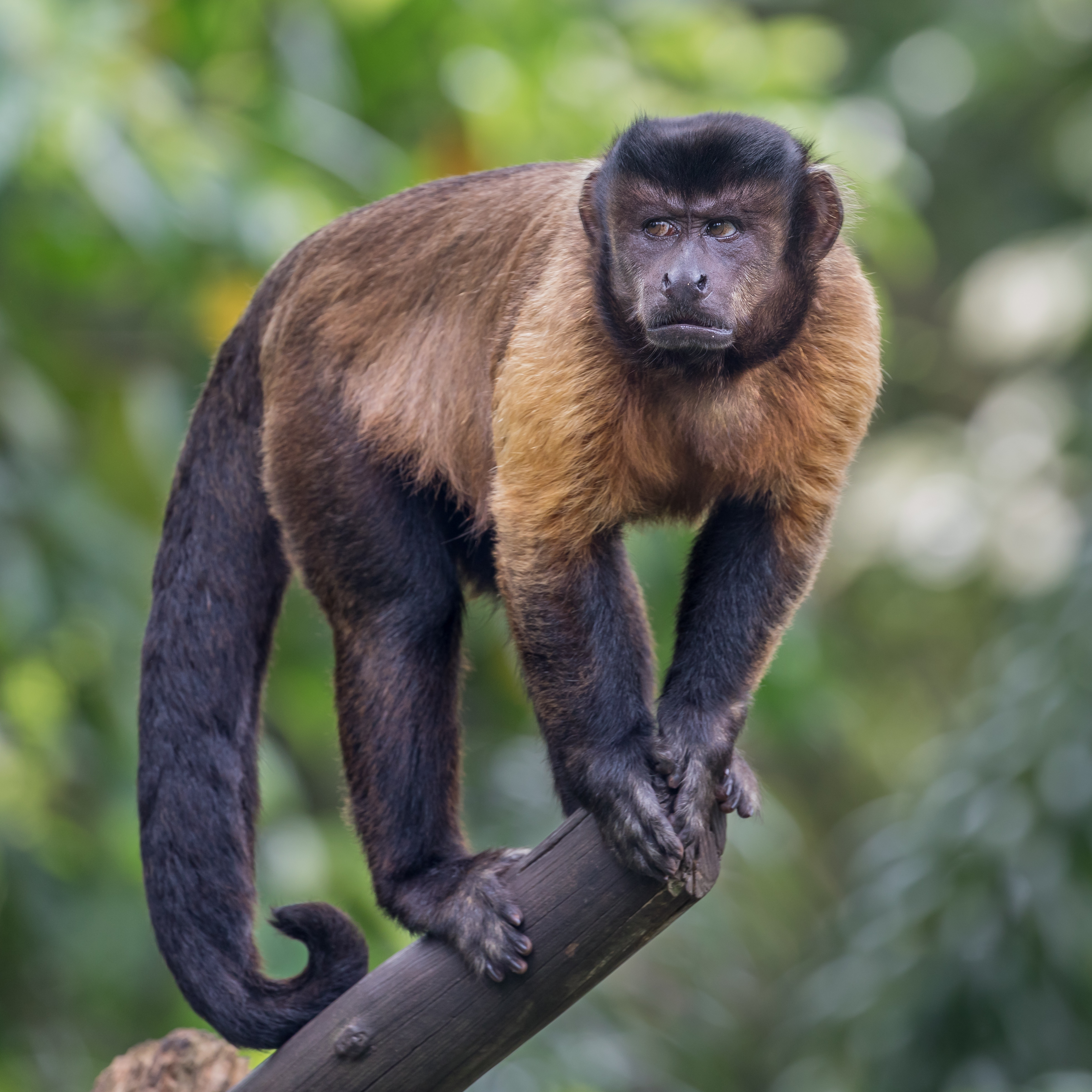
- Male at River Wonders, Singapore
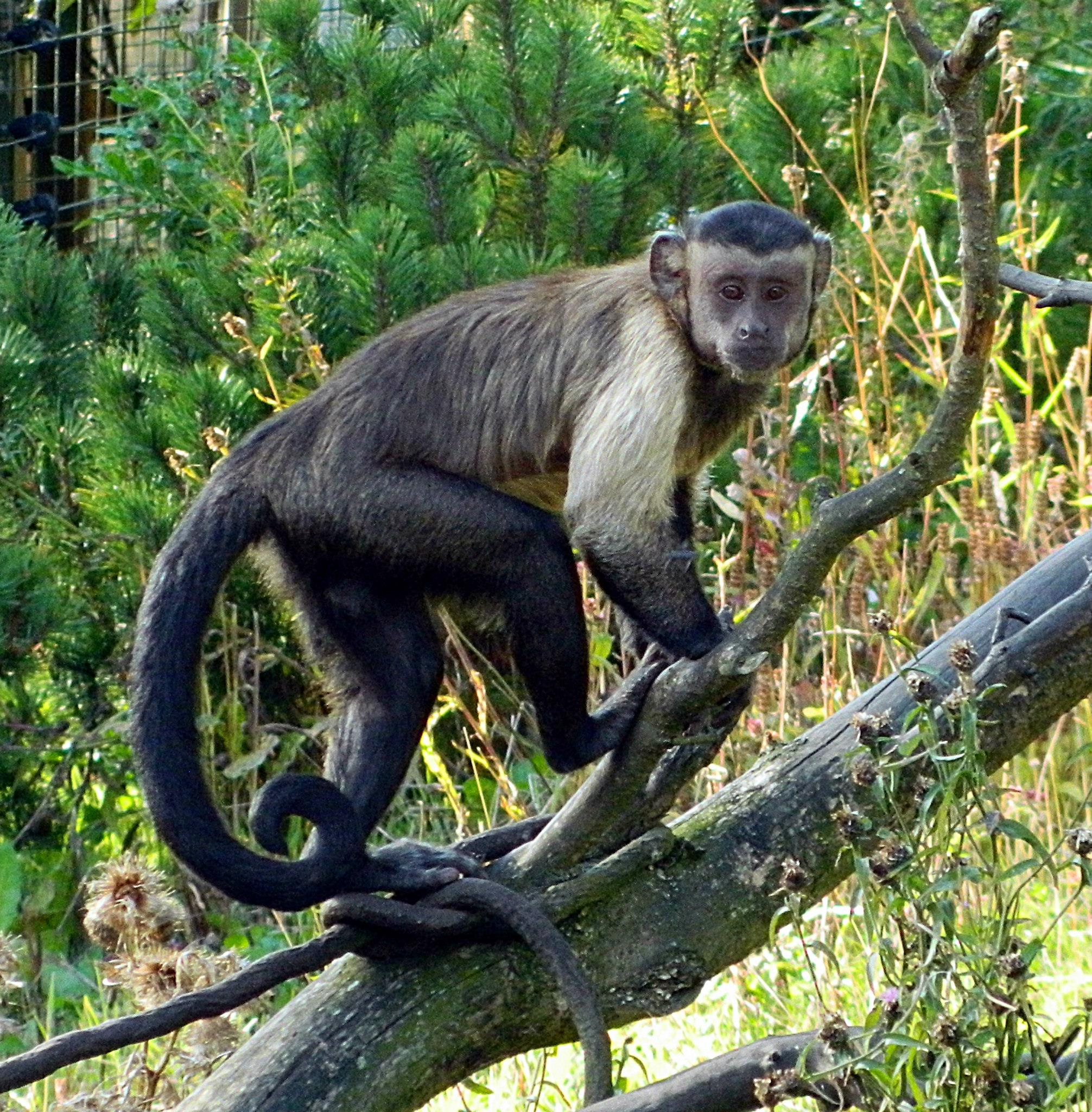
- Female at Edinburgh Zoo, Edinburgh

Conservation status
- Least Concern (IUCN 3.1)

Scientific classification
- Kingdom: Animalia
- Phylum: Chordata
- Class: Mammalia
- Order: Primates
- Family: Cebidae
- Genus: Sapajus
- Species: S. apella

Binomial name
- Sapajus apella (Linnaeus, 1758)

Subspecies
- Sapajus apella macrocephalus Sapajus apella apella
- Geographic range following taxonomy used by IUCN
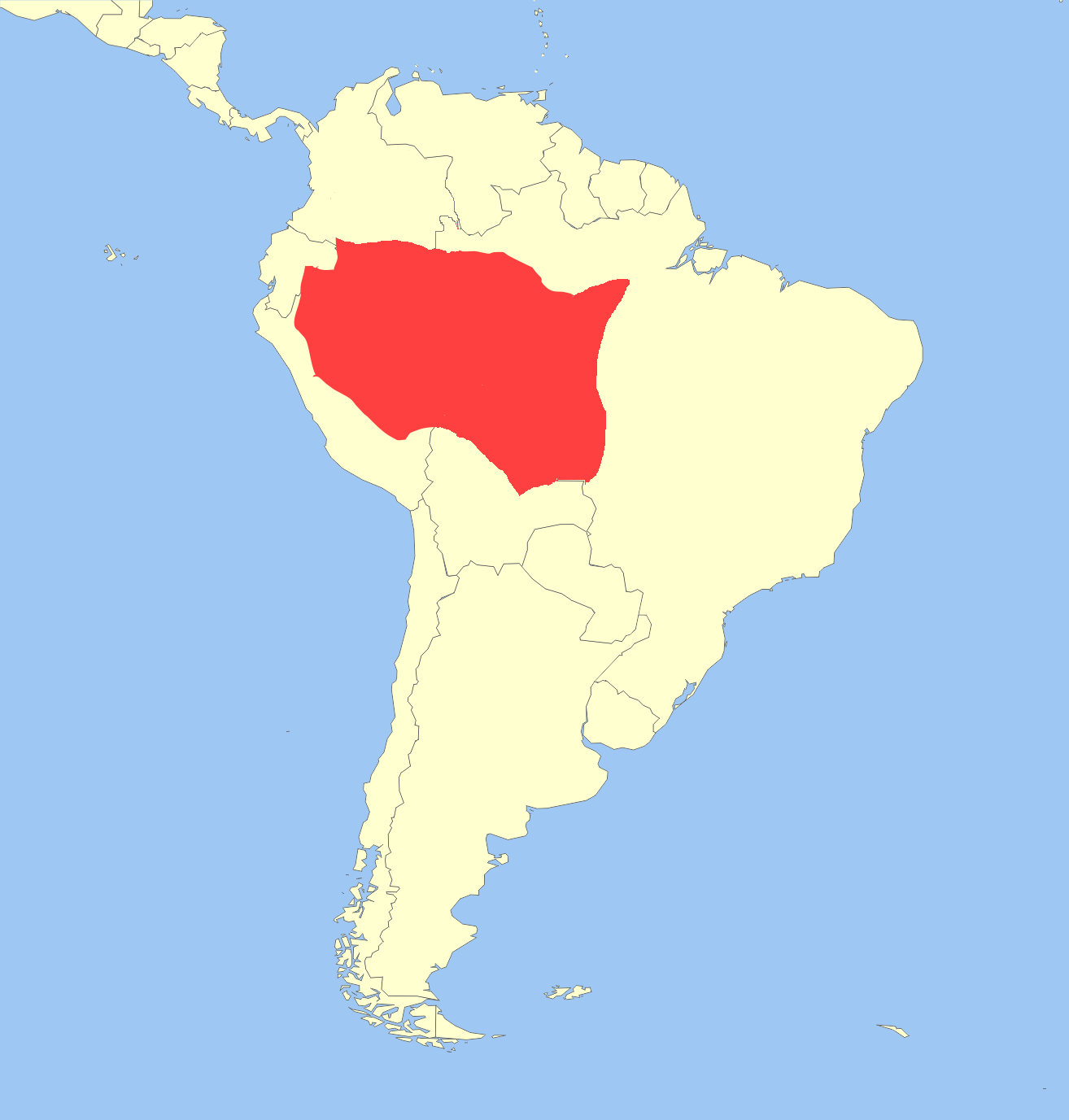
- Range of subspecies macrocephalus

Synonyms
- Cebus apella Linnaeus, 1758; Simia apella Linnaeus, 1758; Simia fatuellus Linnaeus, 1766

= Tufted capuchin =

Species of New World monkey

The tufted capuchin (Sapajus apella), also known as brown capuchin, black-capped capuchin, or pin monkey, is a New World primate from South America and the Caribbean islands of Trinidad and Margarita.

The tufted capuchin is omnivorous, mostly feeding on fruits and invertebrates, although it sometimes feeds on small vertebrates (e.g. lizards and bird chicks) and other plant parts. It can be found in many different kinds of environment, including moist tropical and subtropical forest, dry forest, and disturbed or secondary forest.

Like other capuchins, it is a social animal, forming groups of 8 to 15 individuals that are led by an alpha or dominant male.

== Taxonomy and phylogeny ==
At one point, all tufted capuchins were classified as Cebus apella. Under such taxonomy, the range of C. apella would extend throughout much of South America from Colombia to northern Argentina. Although she did not describe specific or subspecific nomenclature, Torres de Assumpção (1983; 1988) described differences between tufted capuchins from five distinct geographic regions of Brazil and high phenotypic variation of individuals in a sixth area that had a greater selection pressure. In 2001, Silva Júnior proposed that the robust capuchins such (formerly the C. apella group) be placed in a separate genus, Sapajus, from the gracile capuchins (formerly the C. capucinus group) which retain the genus Cebus. This was supported by Jessica Lynch Alfaro et al. in 2011. Groves (2005) recognized six subspecies: Cebus apella apella, C. a. fatuellus, C. a. macrocephalus, C. a. margaritae, C. a. peruanus, C. a. tocantinus. The IUCN follows Silva (2001) and recognises the species as monotypic, though the subspecies status of S. a. margaritae is unclear.

As traditionally defined, the tufted capuchin is one of the most widespread primates in the Neotropics, but specialsts have recommended considering the black-striped, black and golden-bellied capuchins as separate species in a new genus, thereby effectively limiting the tufted capuchin to the Amazon basin and nearby regions. However, the large-headed capuchin (S. a. macrocephalus), previously defined as a distinct species, has been reclassified as a subspecies of the tufted capuchin, expanding its range east to Peru and Ecuador and south to Bolivia.

== Physical characteristics ==
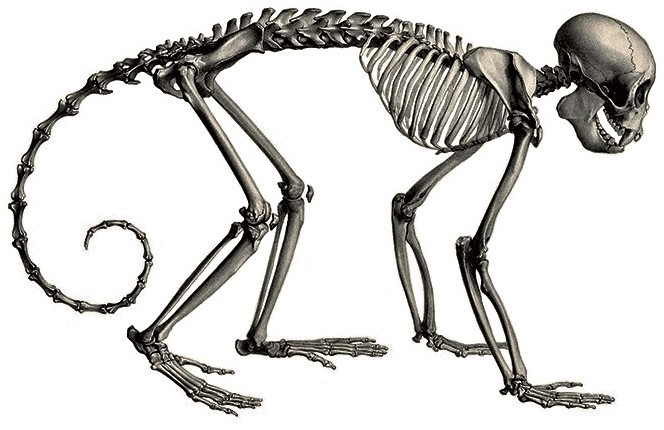
Skeleton

The tufted capuchin is more powerfully built than the other capuchins, with rougher fur and a long, thick tail. It has a bundle of long, hardened hair on the forehead that can be raised as a sort of "wig". The fur is brownish gray, with the belly being somewhat lighter-colored than the rest of the body. The hands and feet are black. The tail is prehensile: strong and can be used for grasping, as an extra limb.

The tufted capuchin has a head-body length of 32 to 57 centimetres (13 to 22 in), a tail length of 38 to 56 centimetres (15 to 22 in), and a weight of 1.9 to 4.8 kilograms (4.2 to 10.6 lb), with the males generally being larger and heavier than the females.

== Behaviour and ecology ==
The tufted capuchin is a diurnal, arboreal primate species, but it often forages on the ground and walks longer distances between trees that are too far apart to jump.

The tufted capuchin lives in groups of two to twenty or more animals. A single group usually contains at least one adult male, with some groups having multiple males. Where multiple males are present, one of the males is dominant. He accepts only a few monkeys in his direct surroundings, mainly younger animals and a few females. The dominant male and the group members that are close to him have the privilege to eat first in case of food scarcity, while subordinate monkeys have to wait until they are ready.

After a gestation period of 180 days, one young is born, or incidentally a twin. This young, which weighs only 200 to 250 grams (7.1 to 8.8 oz), is carried on the back of its mother. The mother feeds her child for 9 months, but the young are sexually immature until its seventh year, which is quite late for a primate of its size.

Important natural enemies of the capuchin are large birds of prey. They are so afraid of those birds that they even become alarmed when a harmless bird flies over.

=== Diet ===
A recently discovered characteristic of one population of this species is that it uses stones as a tool to open hard nuts. First it chooses ripe nuts from a nut palm. It uses its teeth to strip off the nut's fibrous husk. Then it leaves the nut to dry for about a week. When the nut is dry, the monkey lays the nut on a large, flat rock or fallen tree, hammering the nut with a suitable stone until the nut cracks. The hammerstones are often large enough to require lifting with both hands. The anvil rock is often pockmarked with hollows as a result of repeated use.

Besides nuts, the capuchin also eats fruit, leaves, seeds, pith, insects and larvae, eggs and young birds, frogs, lizards, other reptiles, rodents, mouse opossums, and even bats. They are also known to chase cats.

The tufted capuchin looks for its food in groups. As soon as one of the group members has found something edible, he or she may make a large whistling sound, dependent upon the proximity of other individuals and abundance of the food resource so that the other monkeys know that there is something to eat. The composition of the group is very well organized and is determined by rank in the hierarchy. The dominant male often resides somewhere in the middle of the group just behind the front line, so that it is safer when a predator attacks. The vanguard is composed of higher-ranked females who are tolerated by the dominant male. They have the privilege to reach the food first, but they are also the most vulnerable when a predator attacks. It is a host of the acanthocephalan intestinal parasite Pachysentis rugosus.

=== Tool use and manufacture ===
The tufted capuchin has been observed using containers to hold water, using sticks (to dig nuts, to dip for syrup, to catch ants, to reach food), using sponges to absorb juice, using stones as hammer and chisel to penetrate a barrier and using stones as hammer and anvil to crack nuts. While some of these tasks are relatively simple by cognitive standards (e.g. using a stick to catch ants), others, like cracking nuts with hammer and anvil are only exceeded in complexity by chimpanzees.

The potential for tool use in animals like the tufted capuchin depends on a number of conditions that would increase its likelihood of appearing in a given species. Van Schaik proposed that the occurrence of tool use would be likely in foraging species if three factors were present: manual dexterity, intelligence, and social tolerance. As it applies to manual dexterity, capuchins are capable of a limited precision grip (the ability to delicately pinch and manipulate objects with the thumb and fingertips), which is not found in any other New World monkeys and only found in limited amounts in apes. C. apella has an encephalization ratio greater than the hominids (except humans) and a neocortex ratio that is almost as large as the apes; both of these rough indicators suggest high intelligence. Finally, the tufted capuchin forms social groups typical of a complex and tolerant society.

The tufted capuchin has been observed manufacturing tools both in captivity and in the wild. In captivity, it has been reported as making probing sticks to reach normally inaccessible containers with syrup. It is also capable of understanding the concept of "sponging" and using paper towels, monkey biscuits, sticks, leaves and straw to sop up juice and then suck on the sponge to consume the juice. Research in the wild has shown that capuchin tool use is every bit as extensive as in captivity with capuchins being observed using stones to dig holes to get at tubers, an activity previously only seen in humans. The practice of using stones to crack nuts has arisen spontaneously in many locations such as in the Caatinga Dry Forest and Serra da Capivara National Park, all in Brazil and hundreds of miles apart. It has been observed cracking various nuts and fruits such as palm nuts (Attalea and Astrocaryum spp.) and jatobá fruits (Hymenaea courbaril). The tufted capuchin has even been observed using stones to dislodge other stones that would later be used as hammers or shovels, an example of a more complex tool using behavior known as second-order tool use previously only found in chimpanzees. Curiously, not all tufted capuchins engage in tool use. Moura and Lee (2004) suggest lack of other food sources as the key factor. Ottoni and Mannu (2001), Fragaszy et al. (2004) and Visalberghi et al. (2005) have proposed this is likely more a factor of a monkey's terrestrial habit: the more time a monkey spends on the ground, the more likely it is to profit from (and thus engage in) tool use.

In captivity, the tufted capuchin has been seen to manufacture stone tools that produced simple flakes and cores. Some of the capuchins even used these sharpened stones to cut (in a back-and-forth motion) barriers in order to reach food. The importance of this behavior is that it serves as evidence of mechanical proclivity to modify stones by using behaviors already in the monkeys' repertoires, and this behavior is seen as a precursor to stone-knapping. This early and limited tool use behavior has been hypothesized as similar to pre-Homo habilis and that artifacts of that time would probably resemble those of capuchins.

S. apella tool manufacture and use has been analyzed for potential clues to social learning and problem solving ability, as tool manufacture and use can often shed light on such complex cognitive abilities. Social learning, or the ability to learn from other individuals, is a controversial topic in most nonhuman species like S. apella because of the relative difficulty of determining whether a behavior was learned from imitation or a much simpler form of social learning. One way of closing the gap between concurrent tool related behaviors and their likelihood of arising from imitation is by narrowing down events that would make social learning more probable such as a preference for observing experienced tool users. In this regard, Ottoni and his team found that young capuchins tended to observe the best tool users when cracking nuts.

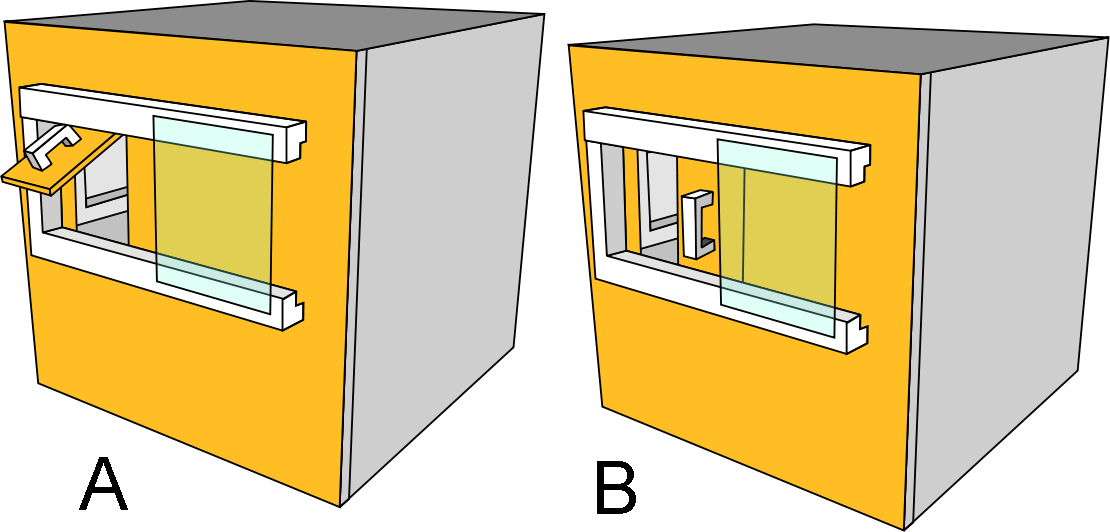
An example of the Doorian Fruit, a box that can open in one of two ways (see image for more info)

Another way of isolating imitation from other simpler behaviors is to present the capuchins with a box that has food but has two different ways of opening it. The important point is that neither way should be more advantageous so that the monkey can freely choose one. In one such study, when humans opened the door in front of the monkeys using one way only, the monkeys used that method, even when they discovered the alternative on their own. In another study, capuchin alphas from two separate groups were trained to open the door in a specific way, after which the monkeys were paired with subordinates who learned to open the door in the same way. When capuchins are trained in the same way and this time released into their groups, the habit is once again disseminated amongst all group members even when others discover alternative ways. Nevertheless, the subject of whether or not S. apella learns by imitation is still controversial, because of the inherent difficulty in teasing out unambiguous evidence of a complex cognitive process such as imitation.

=== Problem solving ===
Tool use and manufacture can also shed light on the many aspects of the tufted capuchin's cognitive abilities by determining how it solves some problems. Some non-primates manufacture and use objects as tools. Crows are known to make hook-tools for catching insects, but such activities lack the behavioral plasticity of tool use as evidenced in tufted capuchins who found new ways to use tools that other species could not. But this plasticity in tool use, while suggesting greater complexity and cognitive ability, does not suggest that the monkeys understand cause and effect. It instead implies they are only able to learn from successful efforts but not from failures, nor are they able to refine and improve much. Its ability to repeat successes, coupled with its complex repertoire of behavioral events helps to explain the tufted capuchin's extensive repertoire of innovative behaviors besides tool use.

== Distribution and habitat ==
This species lives in the northern Amazon rainforest of the Guyanas, Venezuela and Brazil and to the west of the Rio Negro, as far north as the Orinoco in Venezuela. It is also found in eastern Colombia, Ecuador, Bolivia, Peru, including the upper Andean Magdalena valley in Colombia. An introduced breeding population is well established in the northwestern peninsula of the island of Trinidad in the Republic of Trinidad and Tobago. The subspecies/population on Margarita Island in Venezuela, S. a. margaritae, is considered Critically Endangered by the IUCN Red List. It can be found in a large variety of forest types, mainly in tropical rainforests (up till a height of 2700 m), but also in more open forests.

The distribution overlaps with that of other species of capuchins, such as the white-fronted capuchin (Cebus albifrons).
