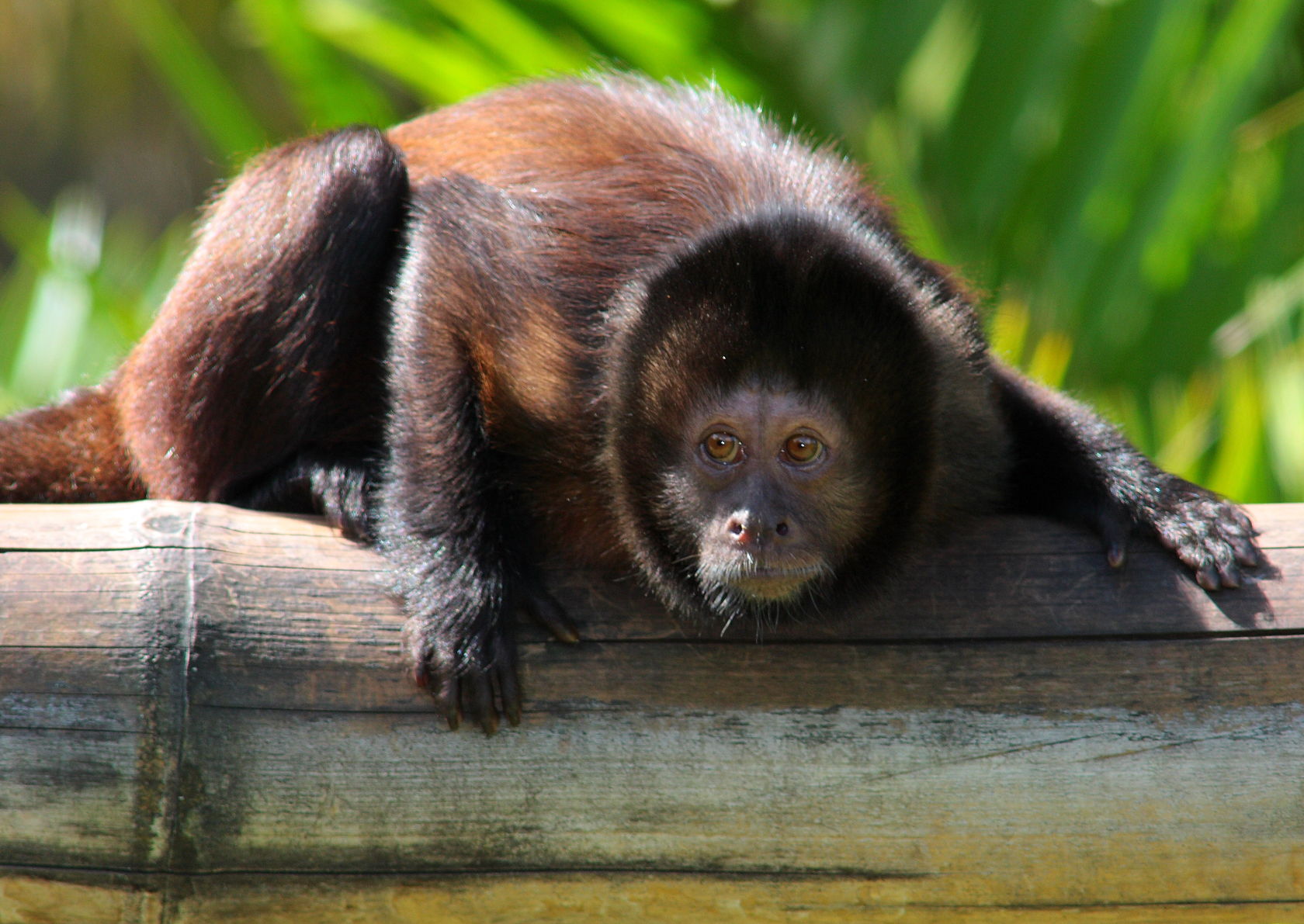
- Perched on a platform

Conservation status
- Endangered (IUCN 3.1)

Scientific classification
- Kingdom: Animalia
- Phylum: Chordata
- Class: Mammalia
- Infraclass: Placentalia
- Order: Primates
- Family: Cebidae
- Genus: Sapajus
- Species: S. robustus

Binomial name
- Sapajus robustus Kuhl, 1820
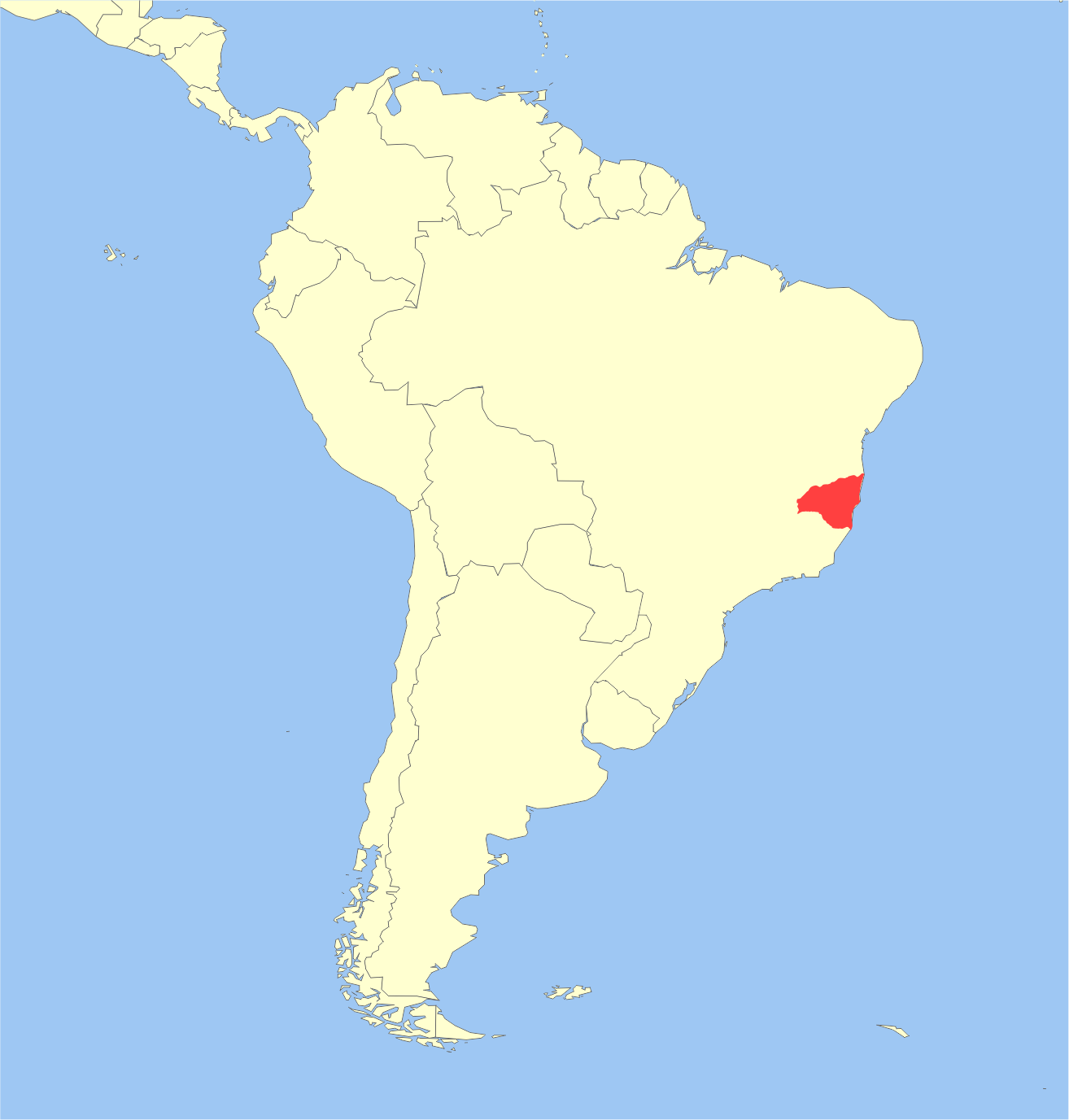
- Crested capuchin range

Synonyms
- Cebus apella subspecies robustus Kuhl, 1820; Cebus robustus Kuhl, 1820; Cebus nigritus robustus Groves, 2001

= Crested capuchin =

Species of New World monkey

The crested capuchin or robust tufted capuchin (Sapajus robustus) is a species of robust capuchin monkey. It is endemic to Brazil. It was formerly considered a subspecies of the black capuchin but is now considered by some to be a separate species.

== Taxonomy and phylogeny ==
When the crested capuchin was discovered, it was formally classified as Cebus apella robustus and considered a subspecies of the tufted capuchin. In 2001, Groves proposed that the crested capuchin was a subspecies of the black capuchin and should be moved to Cebus nigritus robustus. In 2012, it was proposed that the genus Cebus should be split and that all robust capuchins should be under the genus Sapajus. Additionally, it was also argued that the crested capuchin is a separate species from the black capuchin, and therefore the new classification for the crested capuchin should be Sapajus robustus. It has also been estimated using mitochondrial DNA that the crested capuchin diverged from the black capuchin over 5 million years ago, providing further evidence that the crested capuchin is a separate species from the black capuchin. However, Cebus nigritus robustus may still be used to refer to the crested capuchin.

== Characteristics ==
The crested capuchin, unlike other species of capuchins, has a conical crest on the crown which is bright red with a black spot. This cone may also continue around the sides of the head to create a black beard. The rest of the fur may be brownish red or yellowish brown. The forearms, lower legs, and tail of the crested capuchin are all black, although these areas may be a mix of black and light yellow fur in females. Females also may have two lateral tufts on their crown that the males do not have.

Crested capuchins have a head-body length of 33–57 centimetres (13–22 in) and a tail length of 40–47 centimetres (16–19 in). The males are generally larger than the females of the species. They can weigh from 2.0–3.8 kilograms (4.4–8.4 lb).

== Distribution and habitat ==
The crested capuchin formerly occurred between the Doce and Jequitinhonha rivers, in Espírito Santo, Minas Gerais and Bahia, on the Atlantic coast of Brazil. However, due to loss of habitat, their current range has been restricted in Bahia, eastern Minas Gerais, south of Rio Jequitinhonha and north of Rio Doce. It generally frequents the mid-canopy to understory of tropical lowland and sub-montane forests, but may also live in semi-deciduous dry forests in the western part of their range.

== Ecology ==
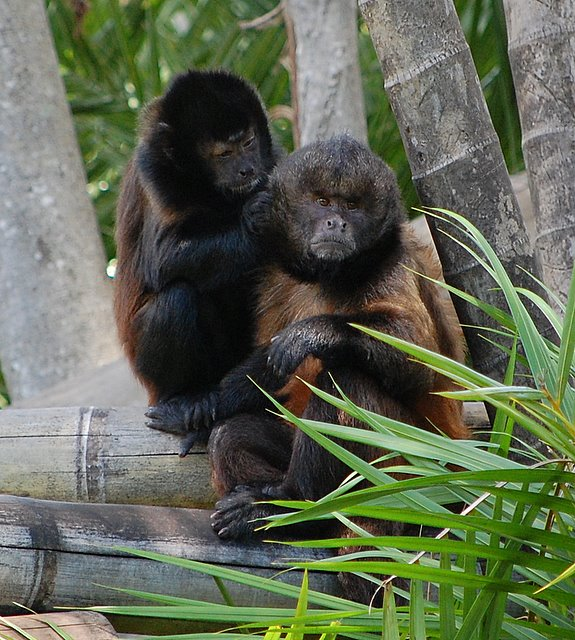
Grooming

The species has a broad diet, including fruits, seeds, and arthropods, as well as frogs or even small mammals. They are very skilled at manipulating food items to reach the food they want. While no crested capuchins have been recorded using tools, it is very possible that they do. Other species of robust capuchins that have been studied more, such as the black capuchin, have been documented using stones to open food items such as fruits with hard shells or oysters. Given the similarities between the two species and their ranges, crested capuchins may also use tools in this way. No observations have been made specifically on the crested capuchin, but they likely live in linear hierarchies that span both sexes, with the top-ranking male dominating the top-ranking female, similar to other closely related species of capuchin. Males ranked lower than the dominant male may also be a part of capuchin groups, but they often remain on the peripheral of the group.

== Conservation ==
Crested capuchins were first classified as vulnerable in 1995 by the IUCN and became classified as endangered in 2008. Although their range includes several conservation areas, they occur only in a relatively small area, where they are under pressure from hunting and habitat destruction by conversion to agriculture.
