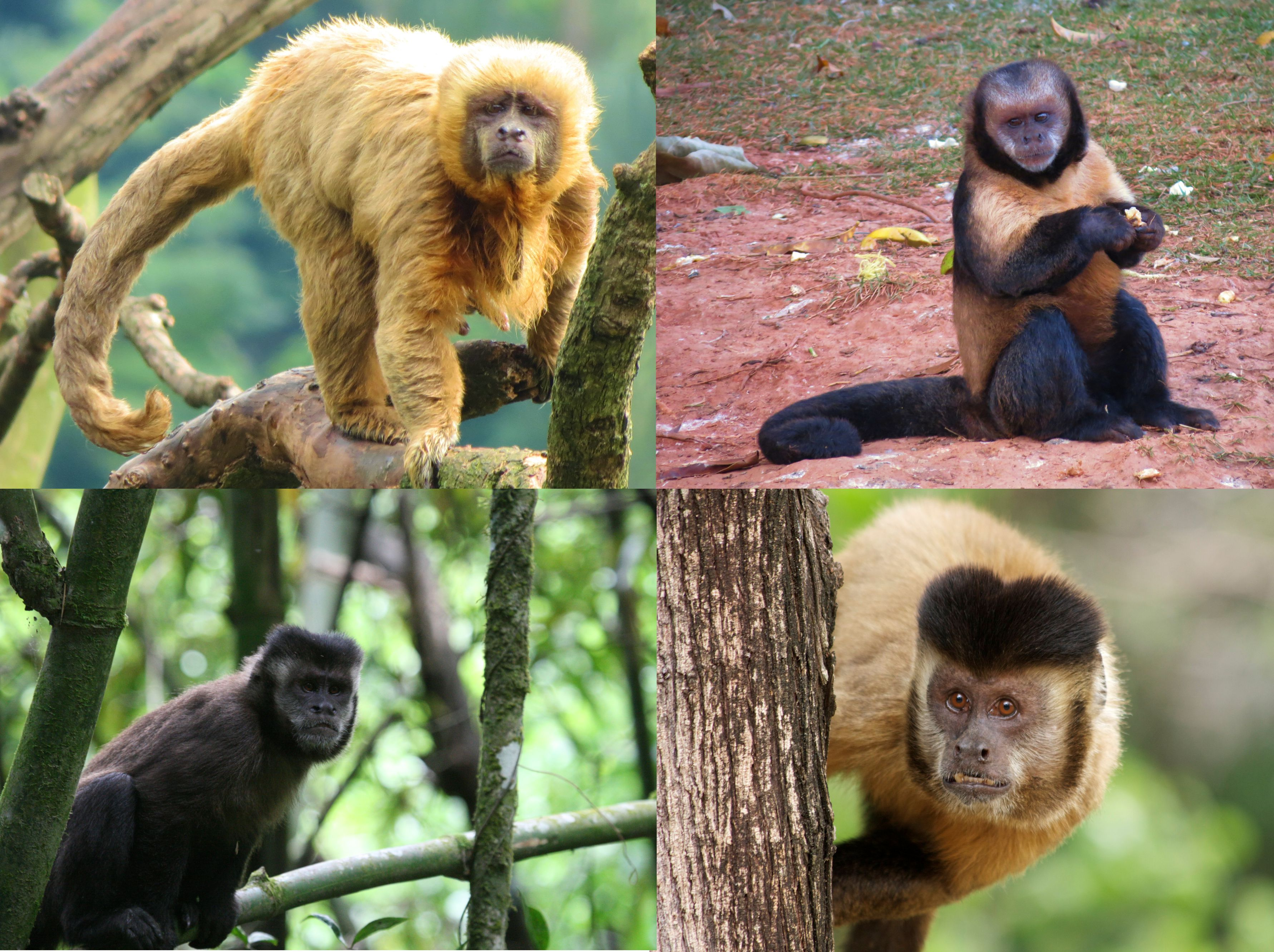
- Four species of robust capuchins, from top to bottom, from left to right: S. flavius, S. xanthosternos, S. nigritus, S. libidinosus

Scientific classification
- Kingdom: Animalia
- Phylum: Chordata
- Class: Mammalia
- Order: Primates
- Family: Cebidae
- Subfamily: Cebinae
- Genus: Sapajus; Kerr, 1792

Type species
- Simia apella Linnaeus, 1758

Species
- S. apella; S. cay; S. flavius; S. libidinosus; S. nigritus; S. robustus; S. xanthosternos
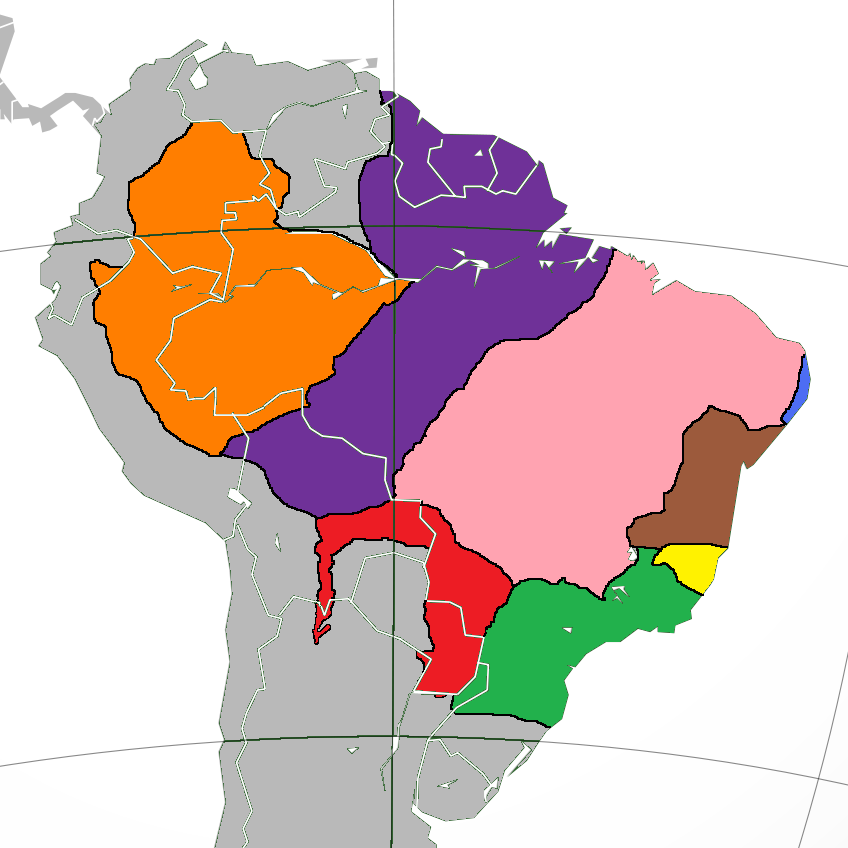
- Range of robust capuchin monkeys S. apella S. cay S. flavius S. libidinosus S. macrocephalus S. nigritus S. robustus S. xanthosternos

= Robust capuchin monkey =

Robust capuchin monkey Temporal range: Late Miocene to present

Genus of New World monkeys

Robust capuchin monkeys are capuchin monkeys in the genus Sapajus. Formerly, all capuchin monkeys were placed in the genus Cebus. Sapajus was erected in 2012 by Jessica Lynch Alfaro et al. to differentiate the robust (tufted) capuchin monkeys (formerly the C. apella group) from the gracile capuchin monkeys (formerly the C. capucinus group), which remain in Cebus.

== Taxonomy ==
Based on the species and subspecies proposed by Groves in 2001 and 2005, robust capuchin monkey taxa include:

Genus Sapajus – Kerr, 1792 – Seven species
Common name	Scientific name and subspecies	Range	Size and ecology	IUCN status and estimated population
Black-capped, brown or tufted capuchin	Sapajus apella (Linnaeus, 1758) Six subspecies: Guiana brown capuchin, Sapajus apella apella; Colombian brown capuchin, Sapajus apella fatuellus; Margarita Island capuchin, Sapajus apella margaritae; Large-headed capuchin, Sapajus apella macrocephalus; Sapajus apella peruanus; Sapajus apella tocantinus	South America and the Caribbean islands of Trinidad and Margarita	Size: Habitat: Diet:	LC
Blond capuchin	Sapajus flavius (Schreber, 1774)	Brazil (northeastern Atlantic Forest extended in the states of Paraíba, Pernambuco, and Alagoas)	Size: Habitat: Diet:	EN
Black-striped capuchin	Sapajus libidinosus (Spix, 1823) Three subspecies: Sapajus libidinosus libidinosus; Sapajus libidinosus pallidus; Sapajus libidinosus juruanus	northern and central Brazil.	Size: Habitat: Diet:	NT
Azaras's capuchin	Sapajus cay (Illiger, 1815)	eastern Paraguay, southeastern Bolivia, northern Argentina, and Brazil (Mato Grosso do Sul and Mato Grosso)	Size: Habitat: Diet:	VU
Black capuchin	Sapajus nigritus (Goldfuss, 1809) Two subspecies: Sapajus nigritus nigritus; Sapajus nigritus cucullatus	North-eastern Argentina and South-eastern Brazil	Size: Habitat: Diet:	NT
Crested capuchin or robust tufted capuchin	Sapajus robustus Kuhl, 1820	Brazil ( Espírito Santo, Minas Gerais and Bahia)	Size: Habitat: Diet:	EN
Golden-bellied capuchin	Sapajus xanthosternos Wied-Neuwied, 1826	south-eastern Bahia, Brazil	Size: Habitat: Diet:	CR

S. flavius was only rediscovered in 2006. The specific species and subspecies within Sapajus are not universally agreed upon. For example, Silva (2001) proposed a slightly different species and subspecies split in which, for example Azara's capuchun, Sapajus libidinosus paraguayanus, is considered a separate species, Sapajus cay, as are the large-headed capuchin and the crested capuchin.

=== Taxonomic history ===
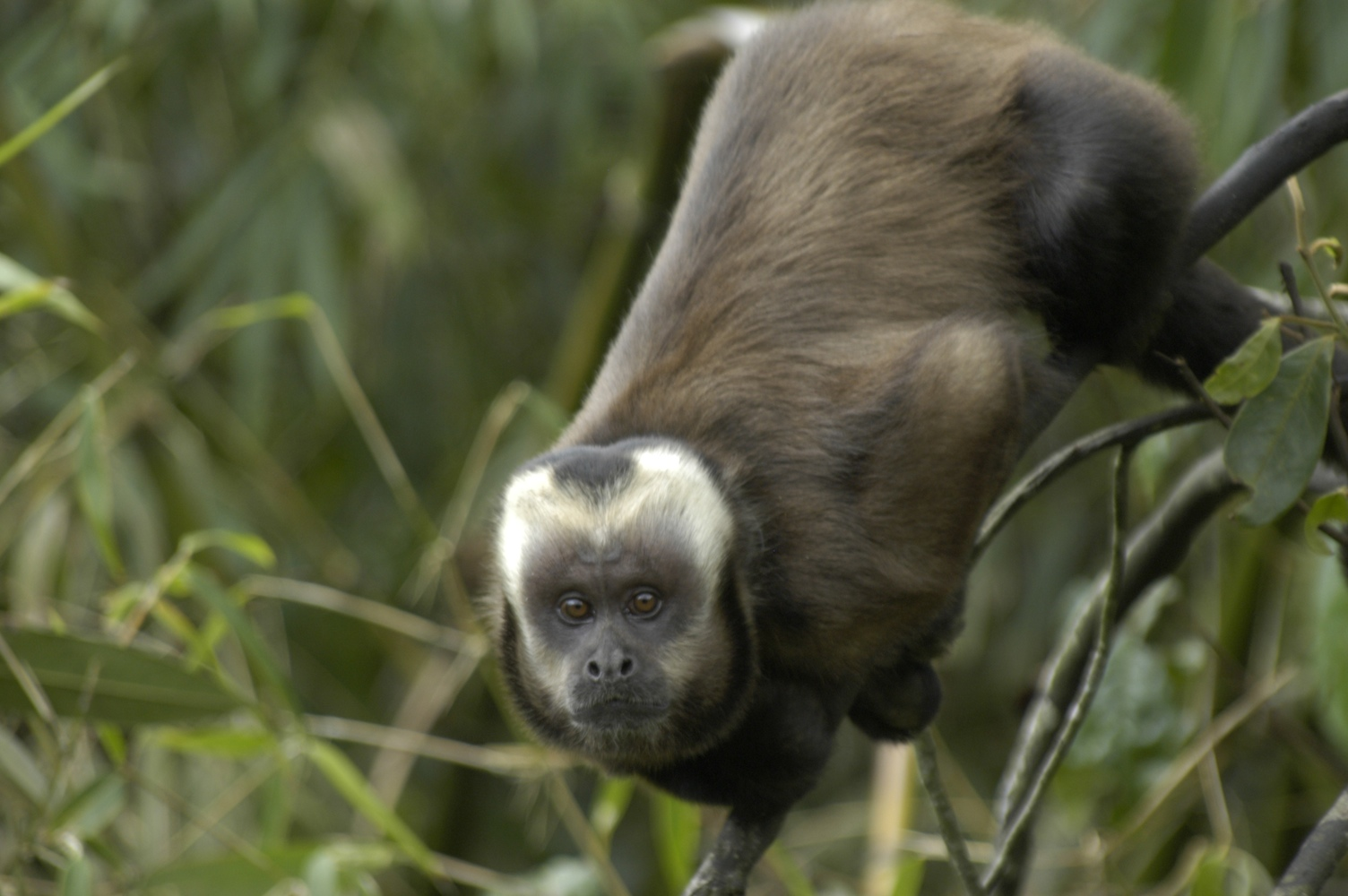
Formerly, the large-headed capuchin was considered a subspecies of S. apella.

Philip Hershkovitz and William Charles Osman Hill published taxonomies of the capuchin monkeys in 1949 and 1960, respectively. These taxonomies included all robust capuchins, described then as the tufted group, in the single species Cebus apella, while three gracile (untufted) capuchin species were recognized. Over time, the original C. apella was split into the additional species of robust capuchin monkeys recognized today. In 2001, Silva published a study in which he found greater genetic diversity among robust capuchins than among gracile capuchins. Silva's study also concluded that due to the differences between robust and gracile capuchins, the two groups should at least be placed in separate subgenera within the genus Cebus, offering Sapajus as the subgenus name for robust capuchins. After further studies of the morphology and genetics of the capuchin monkeys, Lynch Alfaro, Silva and Rylands proposed elevating Sapajus to a separate genus in 2012.

== Evolutionary history ==
The genetic studies led by Lynch Alfaro concluded that robust and gracile capuchin monkey genera diverged about 6.2 million years ago. This is approximately the same time that humans and chimpanzees are believed to have diverged. In contrast, capuchins diverged from their nearest common relative, squirrel monkeys, over 13 million years ago. Lynch Alfaro suggested that the formation of the Amazon River may have caused the split that led to separation of robust and gracile capuchins. The robust capuchins then evolved in the Atlantic forest, while the gracile capuchins evolved in the Amazon.

In the late Pleistocene, about 400,000 years ago, robust capuchins began to expand their range northwards into the Cerrado and the Amazon. In some of these areas robust capuchins outcompeted gracile capuchins, and are now the only capuchin monkeys in the area, while particularly in the north Amazon, robust capuchins are sympatric with gracile capuchins. In areas of sympatry, robust capuchins achieve higher population densities than gracile capuchins. This is thought to reflect the advantage of the adaptations for durophagy in the robust forms, which allow them to exploit hard nuts, palm fruit and unripe fruit, while gracile forms are more restricted to ripe fruit. In general, robust capuchins seem to be more flexible in their diet.

== Morphology ==
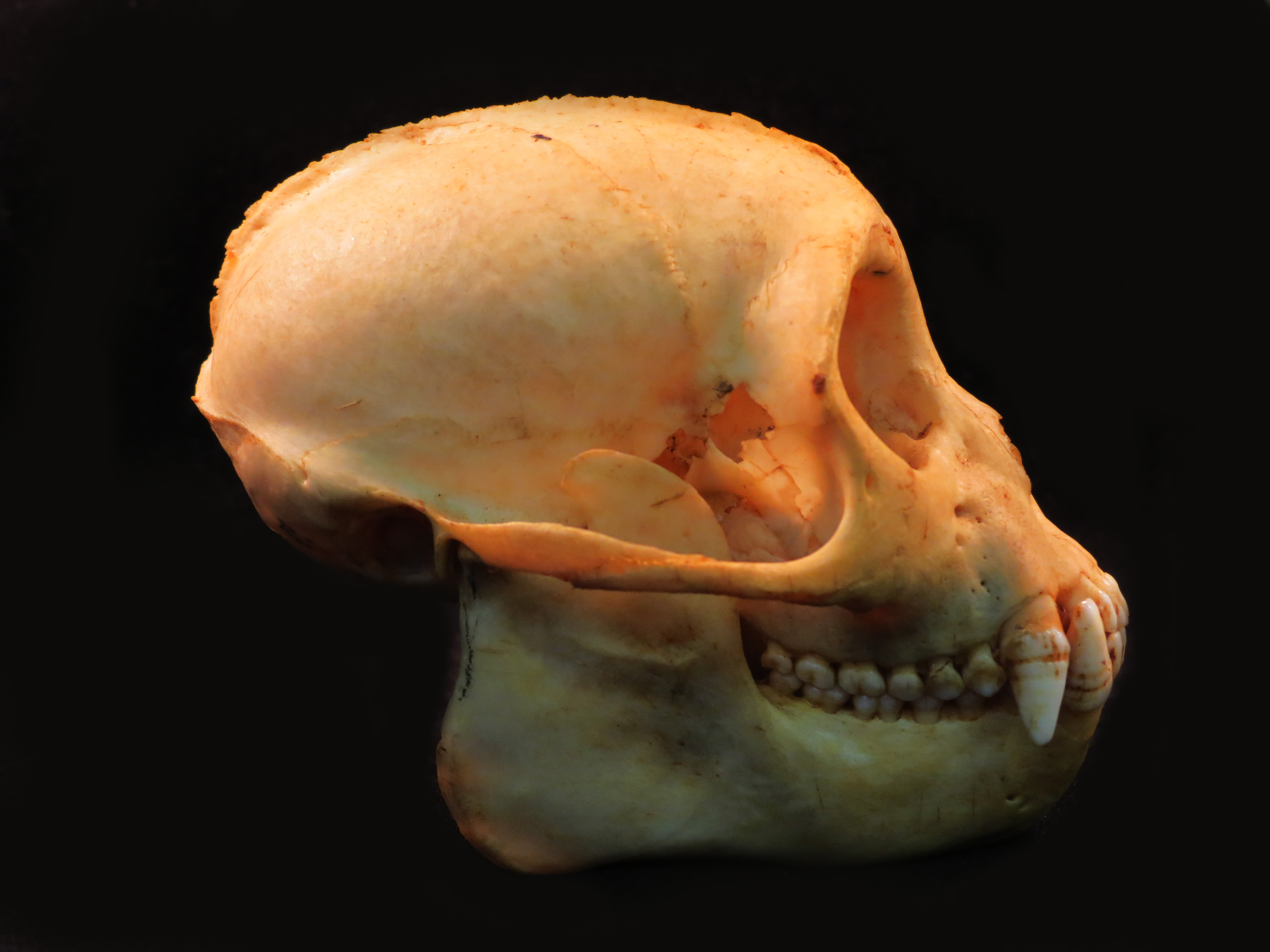
S. nigritus skull, a robust capuchin monkey.

Robust capuchins differ in morphology from gracile capuchins in a number of respects. Some of these are related to behavioral differences between the two genera. Robust capuchins have shorter limbs relative to body size than gracile capuchins. There are significant differences between the skulls of robust and gracile capuchins, particularly among males. These differences include the shape of the nasal aperture and the shape of the mandible. The canine teeth are also different; robust capuchins' canines are shorter and more robust than those of gracile capuchins. Male robust capuchins also have a sagittal crest, which is lacking in gracile capuchins, and larger, thicker mandibles than gracile capuchins. Some of these differences, such as the sagittal crest, the mandibles and teeth reflect robust capuchins' diet, which includes hard nuts and palm fruits that are difficult for gracile capuchins to consume.

Robust capuchins also have some uniformly consistent features of their fur. All robust capuchins have a tuft of fur on their head, at least to some extent, while no male gracile capuchins have such a tuft. They also all have a beard to some degree, which gracile capuchins lack. All robust capuchins have dark fur along their "sideburns" and above their eyes.

== Tool use ==
Some robust capuchins species are known to use stone tools in the wild. These are used to habitually crack open nuts and other shelled fruits, seeds and even oysters. Male capuchins use tools to crack open nuts more frequently than females and body mass is the best predictor of efficiency, but the sexes do not differ in terms of efficiency. Some populations have also been known to use stone tools for digging soil and stick probing tools to flush out prey or dip liquid. Robust capuchins are also known at times to rub defensive secretions from arthropods over their bodies before eating them; such secretions are believed to act as natural insecticides.
