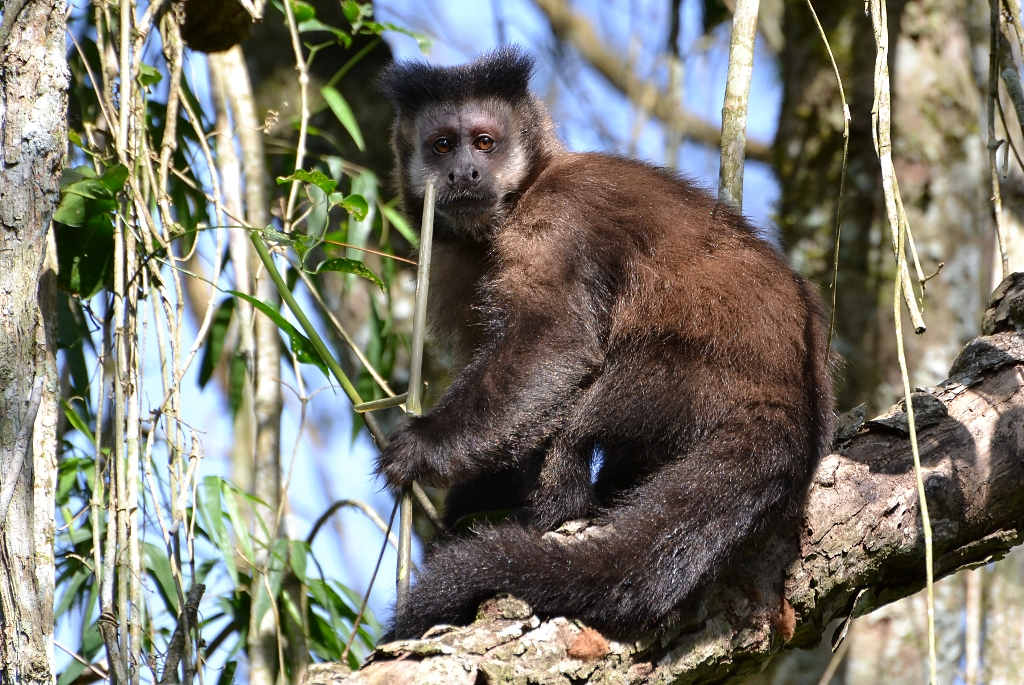
- Black capuchin in Argentina

Conservation status
- Near Threatened (IUCN 3.1)

Scientific classification
- Kingdom: Animalia
- Phylum: Chordata
- Class: Mammalia
- Infraclass: Placentalia
- Order: Primates
- Family: Cebidae
- Genus: Sapajus
- Species: S. nigritus

Binomial name
- Sapajus nigritus (Goldfuss, 1809)
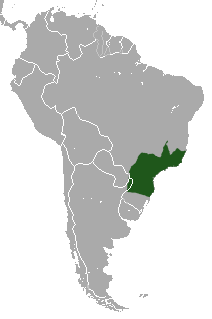
- Combined range of S. n. nigritus and S. n. cucullatus. S. n. robustus is found just northeast of this range (see text).

= Black capuchin =

Species of New World monkey

The black capuchin (Sapajus nigritus), also known as the black-horned capuchin, is a capuchin monkey from the Atlantic Forest in south-eastern Brazil and far north-eastern Argentina. Historically, it was included as a subspecies of the tufted capuchin.

== Taxonomy ==
The black capuchin was originally named Cebus nigritus or Cebus apella nigritus. While this has changed, many sources still name the black capuchin as part of the genus Cebus.

== Social behaviour ==
=== Group size ===
The black capuchin is a social animal that prefers to live in groups, usually consisting of 6 to 20 members. These groups are hierarchical and, while they tend to be made up of more females than males, the alpha female of the group is submissive to the alpha male.

Group size is a function of food availability; size and cohesiveness are highest when food is readily available. When food is scarce, black capuchins split up into smaller groups to cover more ground per capita. This is observed both seasonally in the short term and over the course of years in the long term. The larger the group, the more food they need, which in turn leads to more travel.

Females are, for the most part, philopatric. Although rare, females leaving their natal group can be observed, as dispersal is largely a male phenomenon. When females do leave, they do so gradually, retreating to the group's periphery before breaking away entirely.

=== Aggression ===
Males are apt to kill the offspring of competing males, especially during power struggles. When females are aggressive, it is generally in food squabbles. Even these conflicts, however, are generally relegated to the male portion of the population, with one study finding that females participated in only 19% of such fights. When they do so, however, they are almost always the aggressor (93% of the time in the same study), their favorite target being juveniles. Such conflict perhaps arises due to the tendency of dominant females to take control of patchy areas of food.

=== Communication ===
Communication within groups consists of bodily, facial, and vocal communications. One example of this is the 'scream embrace mechanism', a high-pitched call used to regroup (usually male) members of a group.

=== Bonding ===
Grooming plays a central role in bonding between black capuchins. It serves the obvious purpose of hygiene, evidenced by how the monkeys focus their efforts on the areas of their partner which their partner cannot groom themselves. Grooming, however, also serves several social functions, all associated with bonding. For example, it allows lower-ranked black capuchins to bond with the dominant members of the group, and for members at odds with each other to reconcile and relieve tension.

The purpose of such bonding is often for lower-ranked monkeys to procure easier food access from dominant bond-partners. Females, for example, might compete to groom the dominant female, in those cases where a hierarchy exists, which is not assured among female black capuchins. Still, same-sex grooming is rare, with little to no evidence of male-male grooming and female-female grooming accounting for a minority of cases. Female-female grooming only occurs when the group is highly cohesive. When it does occur, they favor kin. Females more commonly bond with males, particularly the alpha. The hierarchy has other effects on grooming as well. Face-to-face grooming is more frequent when the groomer is dominant and well-bonded with the partner being groomed. The frequency increases even more based on rank-difference; the less equal the monkeys' footing in the above described situation, the more likely face-to-face grooming is.

=== Reproduction ===
Females strongly favor the alpha male in choosing a sexual partner; one study found that he is the target mate in three-quarters of female sexual advances and failed to find any coercion on his part which might force this outcome.

To initiate mating, females possess a wide variety of signals, both auditory and ocular, which they employ at different stages of the process. There is some evidence that these are used to encourage coitus to occur at the time most opportune for procreation, including the increasing frequency with which visual signals occur as ovulation approaches. At least seven distinct calls exist for this purpose alone, although no evidence has been found that call type indicates anything to do with the stage of ovulation or fertility, although they do change pre and post-copulation. Those vocalized after mating may function to assure the chosen mate of his paternity by making the whole affair public knowledge, thereby encouraging him to guard both the female and her resulting offspring from competing mates and infanticide. In this context, the purpose of male postcoital courtship is perhaps revealed to be mate protection. For the same ends, the potentially impregnated female might use visual signals to assure the alpha of his status as her mate, while using vocalizations to confuse the other males as to who the father truly is, thereby discouraging aggression.

== Habitat ==
The black capuchin is found in the Atlantic region of North-eastern Argentina and South-eastern Brazil, with its habitat overlapping with other capuchin species. They are considered arboreal, mainly dwelling in the tree canopy; however, they will also drop to the forest floor to forage, where insects and nuts are most abundant.

== Diet ==
Black capuchin monkeys are omnivorous. They eat a wide variety of foods, including insects, bird eggs, small vertebrates, leaves, bulbs, seeds, and fruits. Their choice among these depends primarily on seasonal availability. While they are considered generalist feeders, fruit can make up as much as three or four-fifths of their diet. They are apt to experiment with new sources, which results in them consuming a diverse diet. One group of black capuchins, for example, ate 61 of 145 fruits available to them in their environment. When they exist in small patches of forest which lack adequate amounts of fruit to feed the whole group, black capuchins have been known to exploit nearby agricultural operations by stripping the bark from trees to eat the pine sap and phloem underneath.

== Subspecies ==
The black capuchin has two subspecies: Sapajus n. nigritus (nominate) and S. n. cucullatus are found in the southern part (the former eastwards, and the latter westwards) of this species' range, and both have a distinctive pair of tufts on the crown, as also suggested by the alternative common name of this species: black-horned capuchin. The crested or robust tufted capuchin (S. robustus) was once considered a subspecies of S. nigritus, but has since been reevaluated as a distinct species.

== Status ==
The black capuchin's population number is unknown but thought to be declining. This is due mostly to habitat loss, hunting, and the pet trade, however the species has been observed to be able to survive in fragmented and sparse areas of canopy. The two southern subspecies remain relatively widespread and are rated as Near Threatened by the IUCN. The distinctive northern subspecies has a far more restricted distribution and it is considered Endangered.
