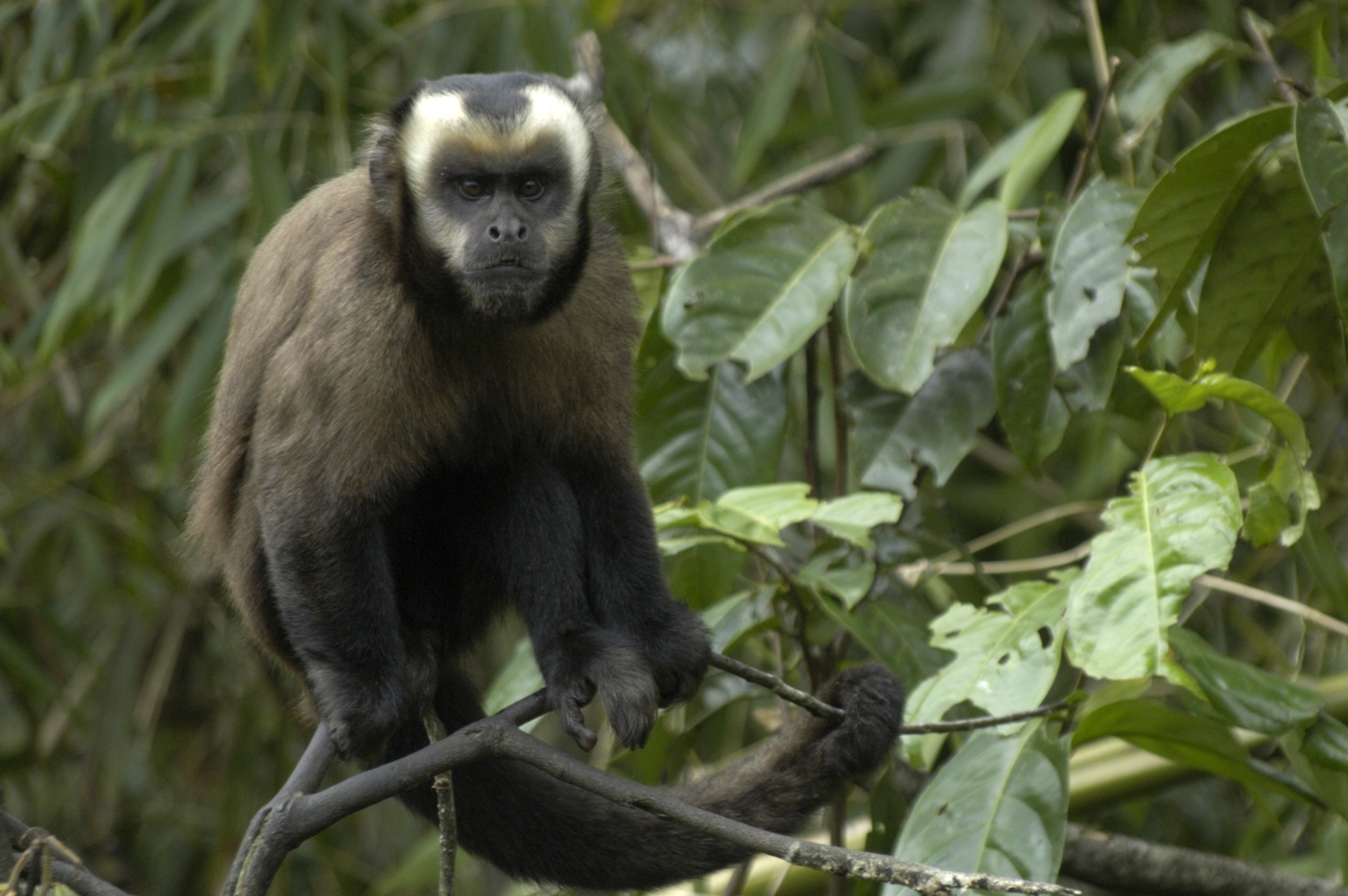
- Adult
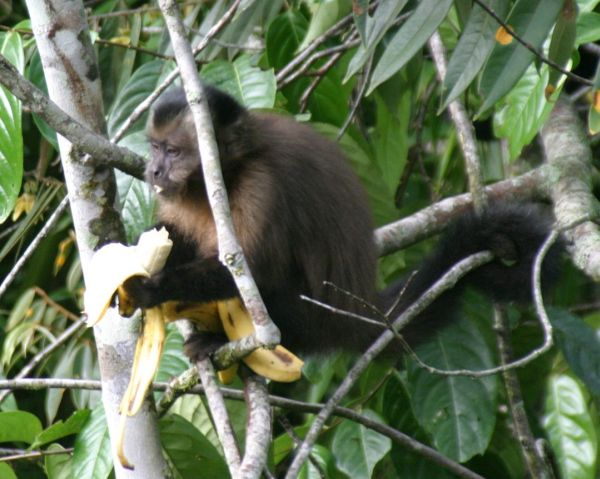
- Juvenile

Scientific classification
- Kingdom: Animalia
- Phylum: Chordata
- Class: Mammalia
- Order: Primates
- Family: Cebidae
- Genus: Sapajus
- Species: S. apella
- Subspecies: S. a. macrocephalus

Trinomial name
- Sapajus apella macrocephalus (Spix, 1823)
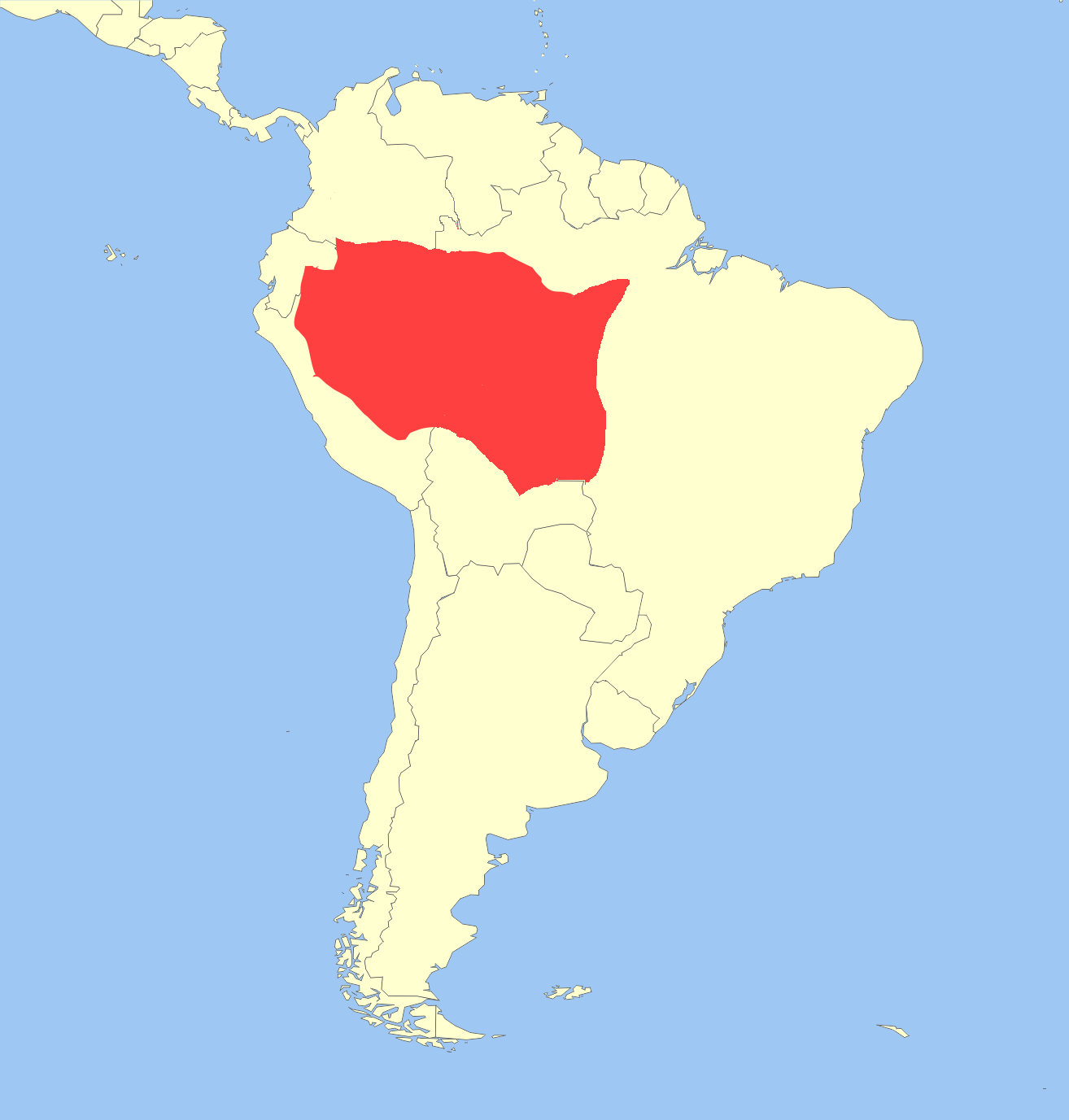

Synonyms
- Sapajus macrocephalus

= Large-headed capuchin =

Subspecies of New World monkey

The large-headed capuchin (Sapajus apella macrocephalus) is a subspecies of the tufted capuchin monkey from South America. It is found in Bolivia, Brazil, Colombia, Ecuador and Peru. It was formerly thought to be its own species (S. macrocephalus), but studies have found it to be a subspecies of the tufted capuchin.
