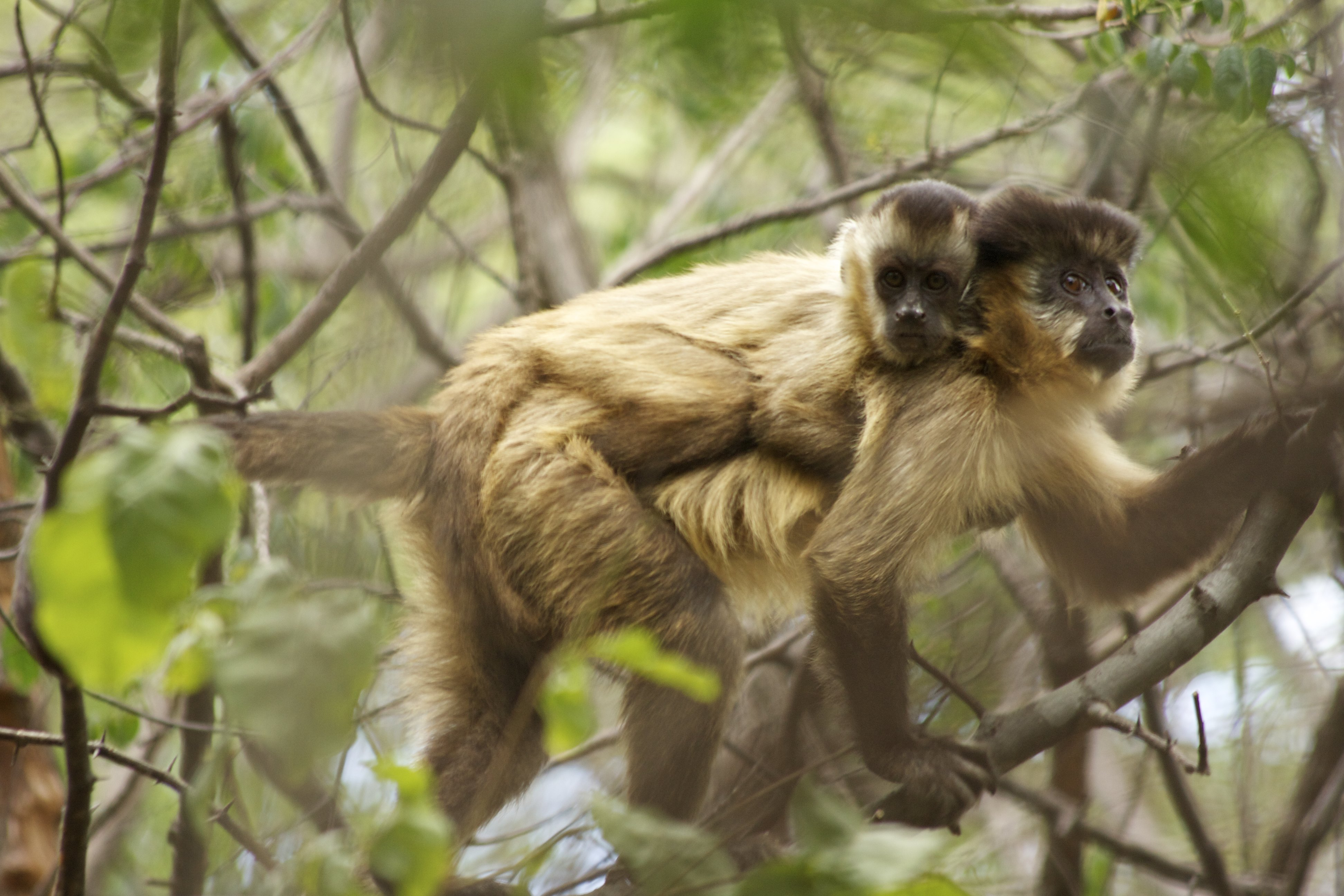
- Adult female and juvenile

Conservation status
- Near Threatened (IUCN 3.1)

Scientific classification
- Kingdom: Animalia
- Phylum: Chordata
- Class: Mammalia
- Infraclass: Placentalia
- Order: Primates
- Family: Cebidae
- Genus: Sapajus
- Species: S. libidinosus

Binomial name
- Sapajus libidinosus (Spix, 1823)
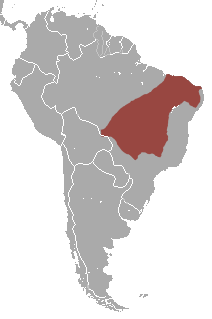
- Black-striped capuchin range map

Synonyms
- Cebus libidinosus

= Black-striped capuchin =

Species of New World monkey

The black-striped capuchin (Sapajus libidinosus), also known as the bearded capuchin, is a New World monkey in the family Cebidae. They are native to northern and central Brazil. These capuchins mostly live in dry forests, and savannah landscapes between the Rio Araguaia and the Rio Grande. Known for its tool use, the black-striped capuchin has been shown to use tools in a wide variety of situations, ranging from using rocks for nut cracking to using sticks for digging. They were, until recently, considered a subspecies of the tufted capuchin, but because of more research and insights, they are considered their own species by many. They often live in highly social groups ranging from 6-20 individuals. Females are philopatric, show coalition, and linear dominance hierarchy. Females reach sexual maturity around 5 years of age and give birth about every 24 months to a single infant.

== Taxonomy ==
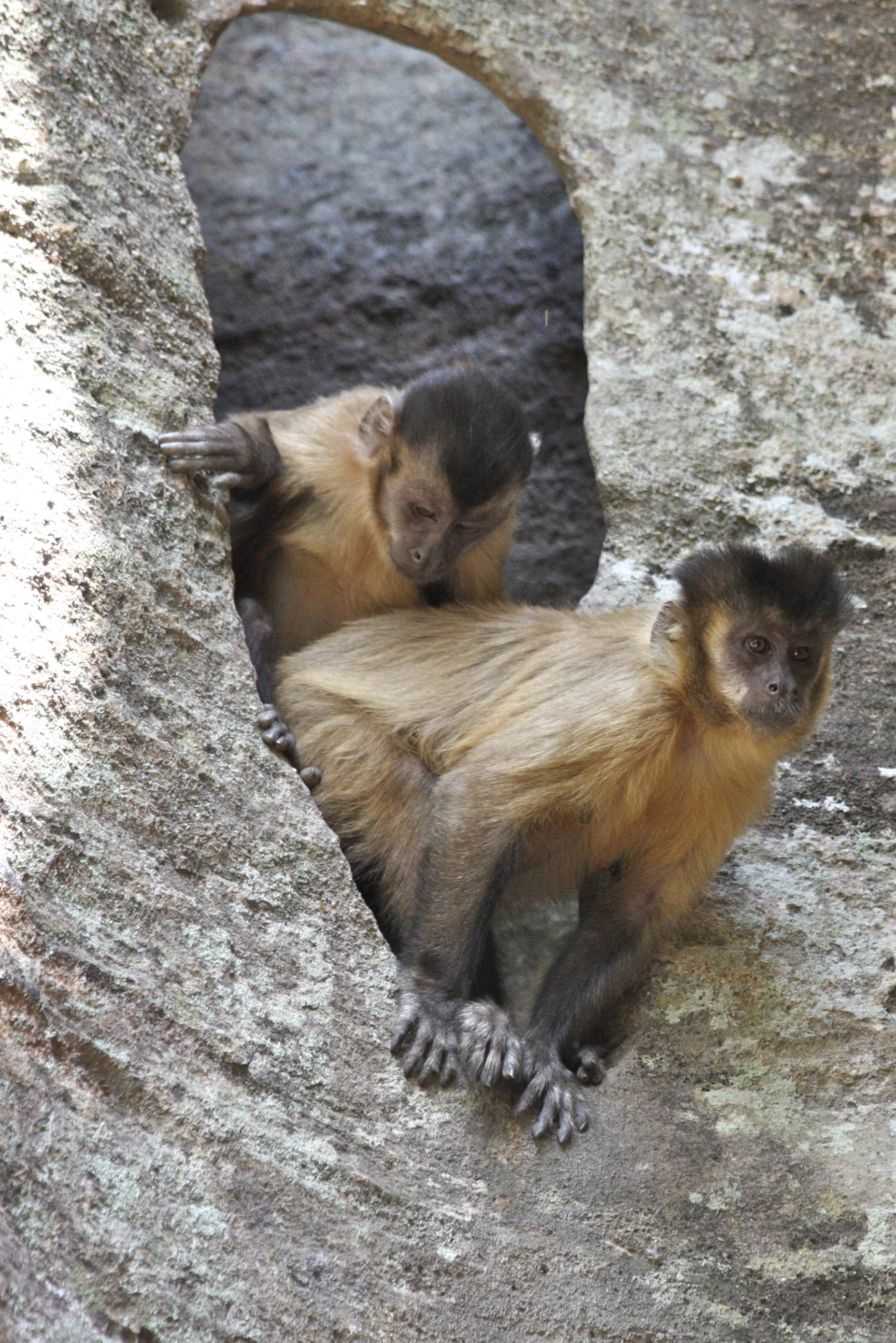
Adult Female & Juvenile At Serra de Capivara National Park, Piaui, Brazil.

The black-striped capuchin is a New World monkey and a member of the Cebidae family, which contains both capuchins and squirrel monkeys. Until the past few decades, the black-striped capuchin was considered a subspecies of the tufted capuchin but has slowly become accepted as a separate species over time. Even within the black-striped capuchin species, we see more taxonomical debate, as the southern population is sometimes considered a species of its own as well, called Azaras's capuchin.

== Reproduction ==
When a female black-striped capuchin decides she is ready to mate, she will follow a male and attempt to get his attention in various ways including throwing rocks and sticks. Males will react first with disinterest and aggression, this is followed by a behavior dubbed "touch and go". Females will touch a male, and then flee before the male can inflict aggression. After some time, males react with interest and the pair can mate.

Females have offspring on average once every two years to a single infant. This infant will be initially carried on the mothers belly, but will transition to her back. They forage independently at two years of age, and are weaned slowly. In Rondônia, it associates with the Bare-eared Squirrel Monkey (Saimiri ustus), and further south with the Black-capped Squirrel Monkey (Saimiri Boliviensis). It is also found with the White-nosed Saki (Chiropotes albinasus).

== Description ==
The black-striped capuchin has only a few physical features that distinguishes it from other tufted capuchins. Similarly, to other tufted capuchins it has a thick and strong tail. It has fur colored light to dark brown on its body, with darker black fur on its tail, arms, legs, and head. It gets the name "bearded capuchin" because it tends to have a darker face, but lighter hair around the mouth and lower face. As it reaches sexual maturity, it gets dark spots on its head as well as sideburns on its face. Yet the features that most distinguish it include orange fur on its neck as well as the yellow tinted fur on its dorsal side.

Males and females often have a similar height of around 37 cm (15 in) but show strong sexual dimorphism in their weights, with males around 3.5 kg (7.7 lb) and females around 2.1 kg (4.6 lb). The bearded capuchin can live up to 25 years in the wild, but much longer when in captivity.

== Behavior ==
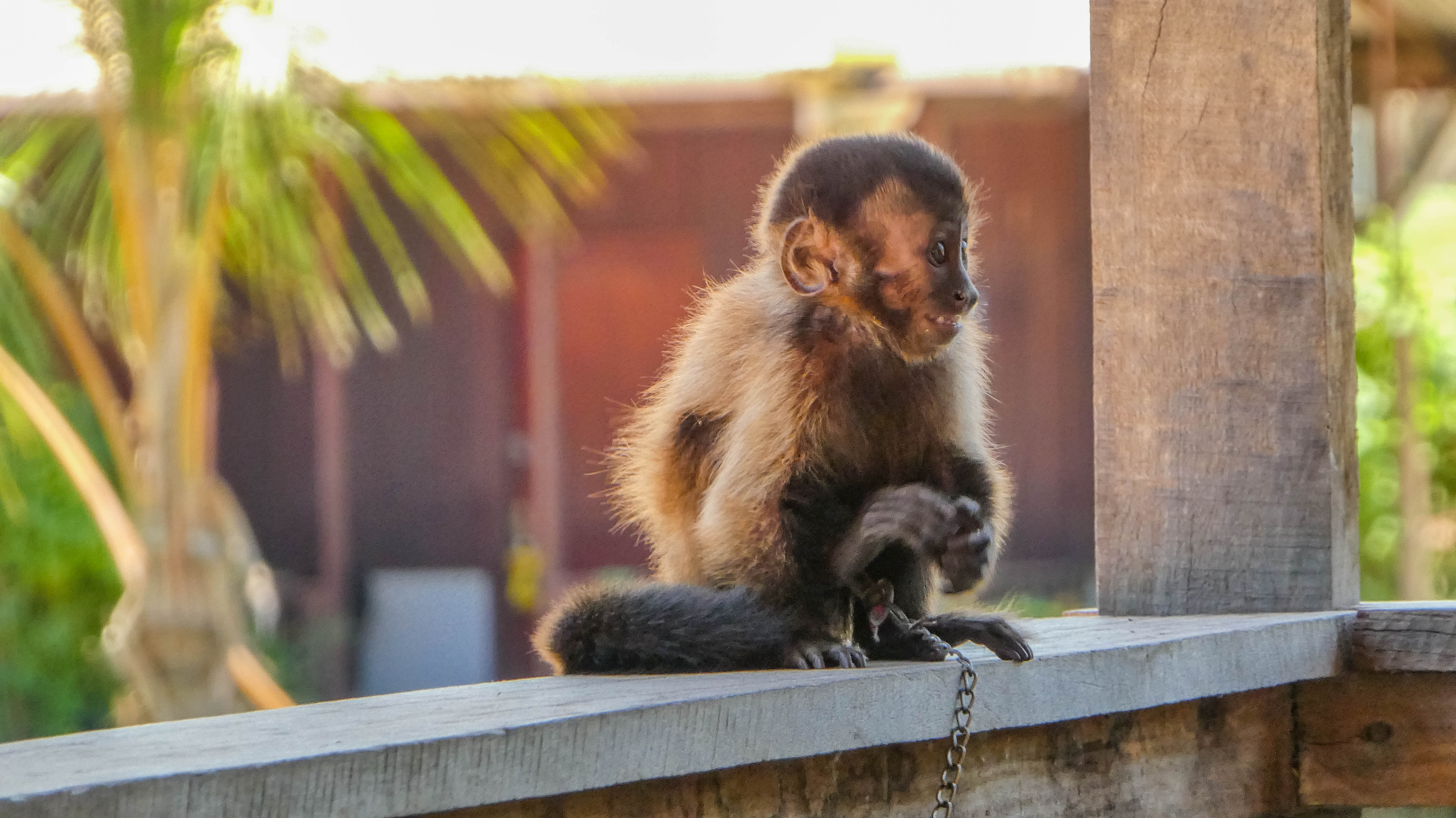
Young pet monkey in Brownsweg, Suriname

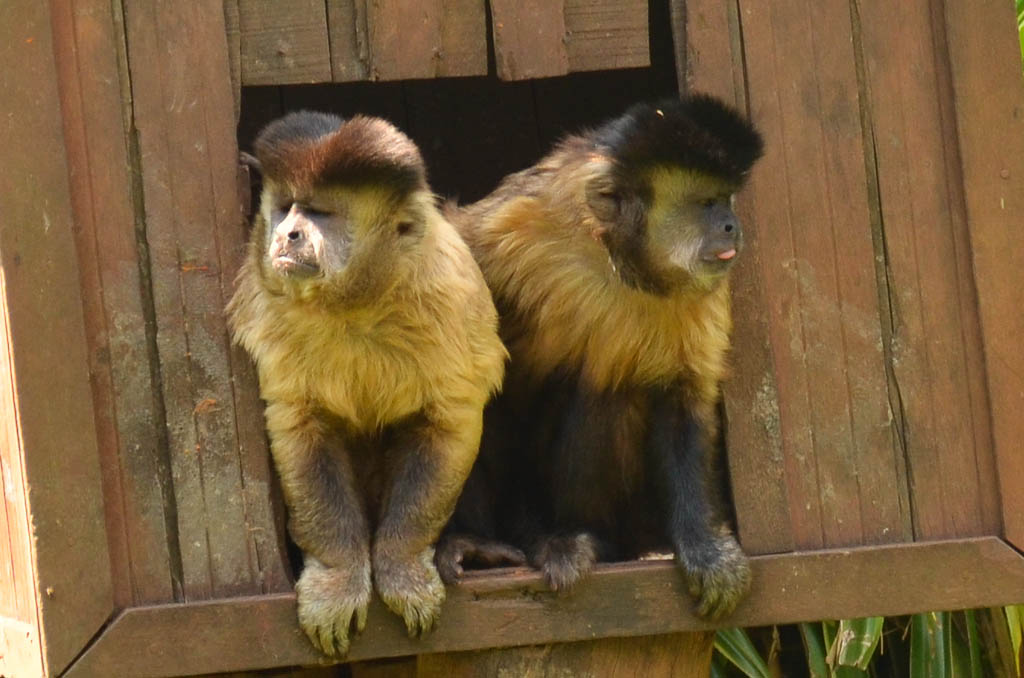
In Paulínia Zoo

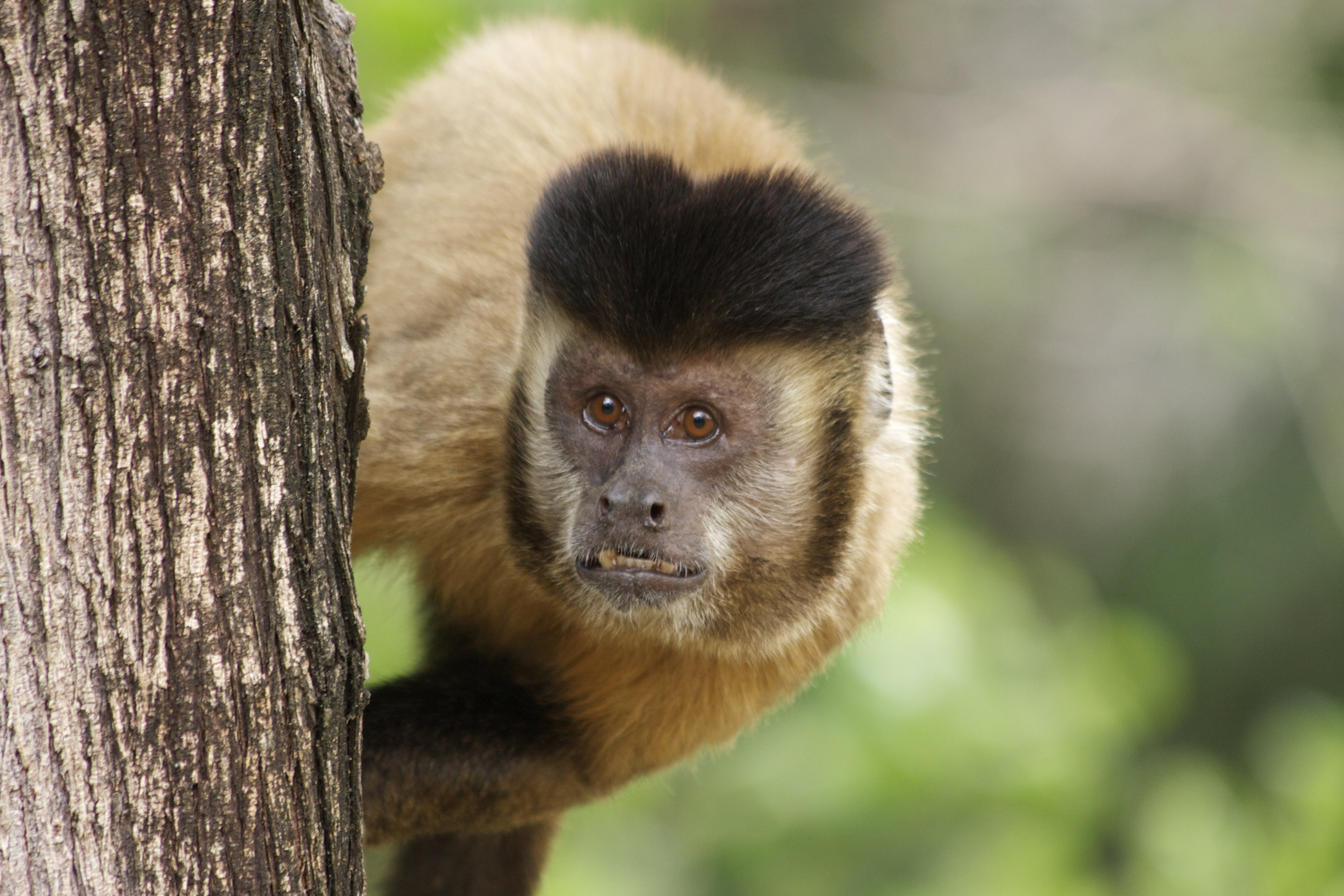
In Parque Nacional Serra da Capivara, PI, Brazil

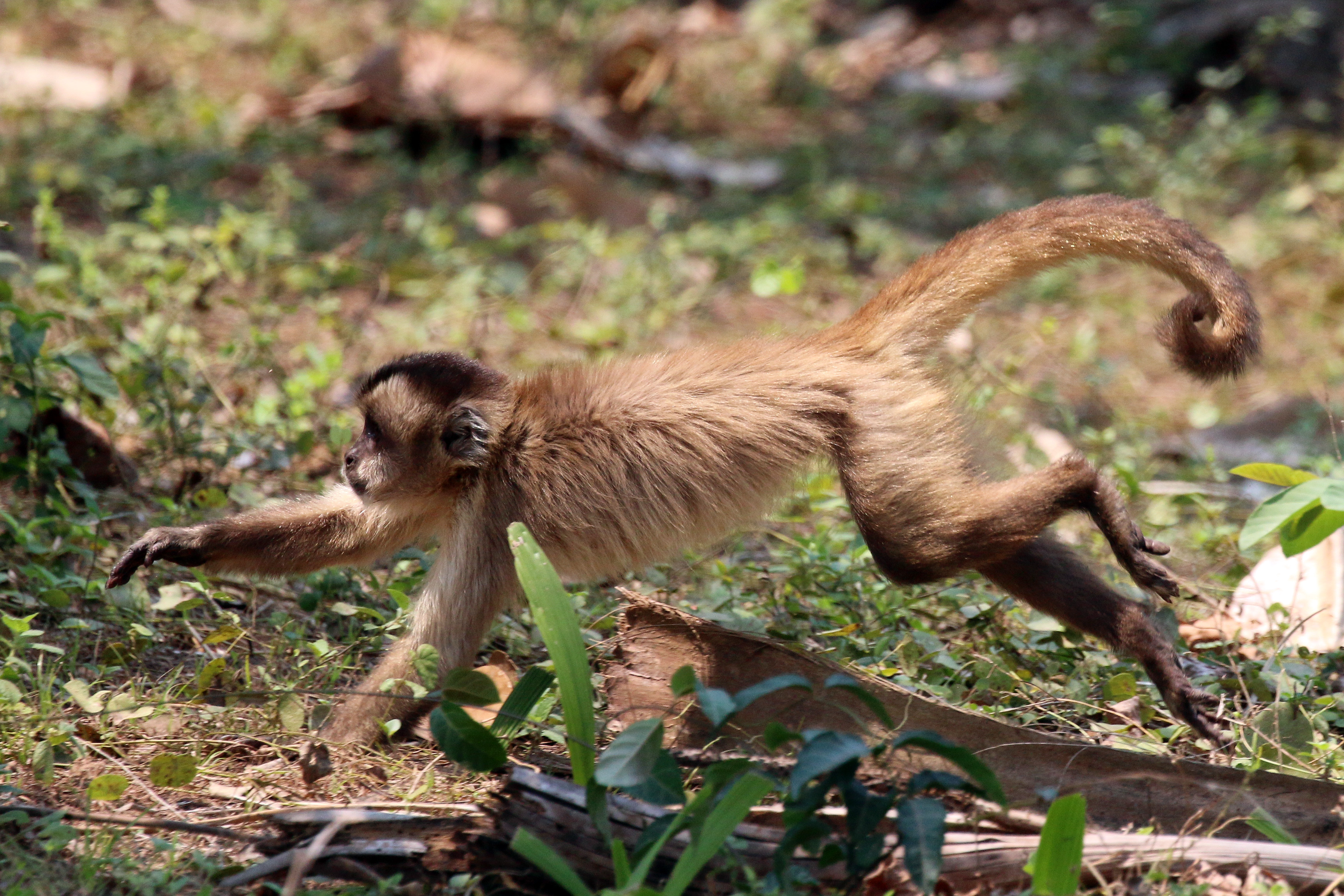
Running in the Pantanal, Brazil

The black-striped capuchin is best known for its use of tools. Their use of tools can be found in many aspects of their life and they were the first non-ape primate to have been documented using tools. They have been known to take nuts, place them on a stone anvil, and use another stone to crack them open.

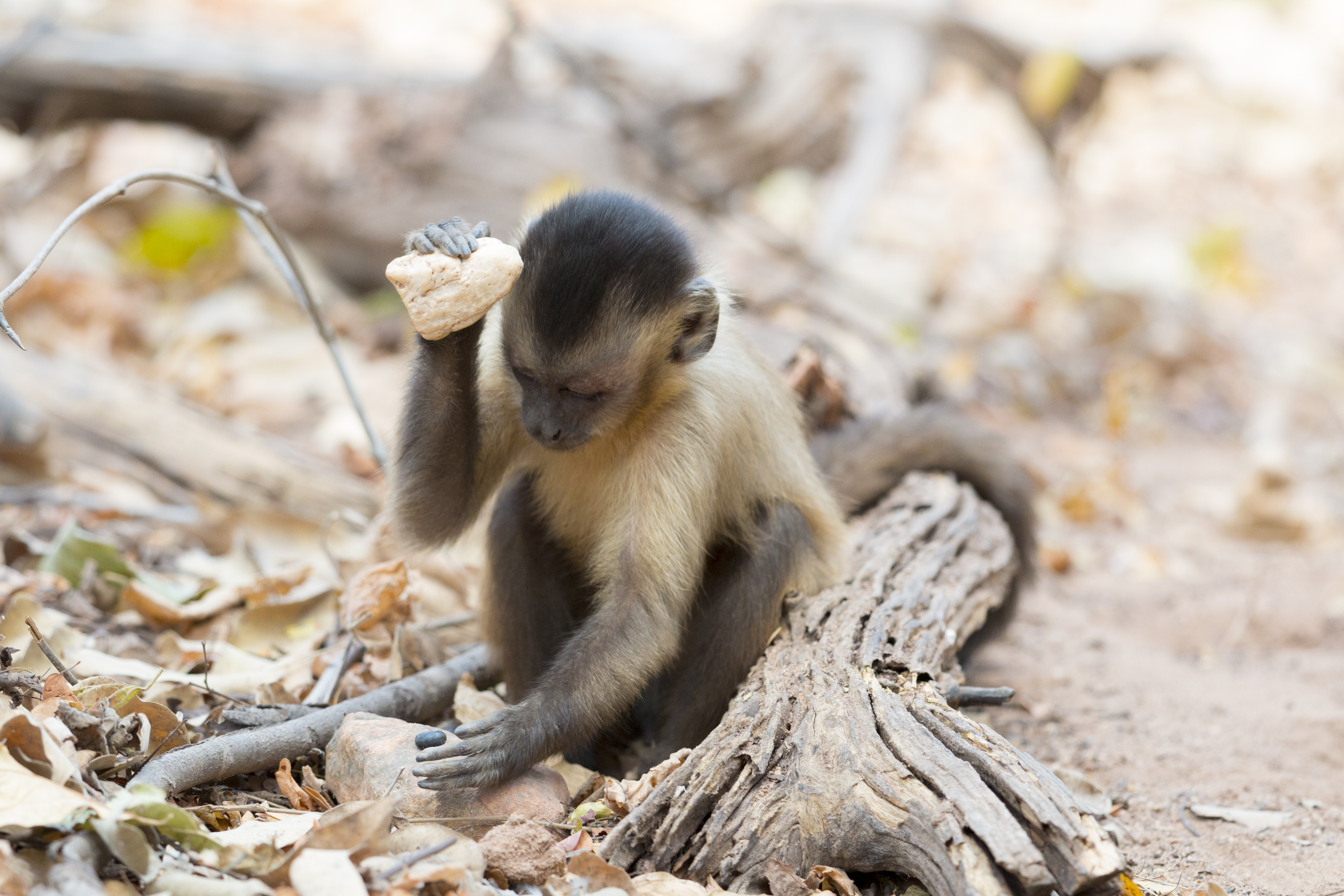
A juvenile using a stone to crack seeds

Aside from that, they have also been seen using tools to dig in the ground. Using tools to dig, they can find foods like roots, tubers, as well as scare prey out of hiding spots. Sticks also seem to be used to probe as well as dip for honey in the wild. Stones play an interesting role in reproduction, as females will throw them at males for attention. The monkeys also have found ways to use tools as a form of intimidation. It has been shown that they also use stones to make loud noises in order to intimidate potential predators.

Males have been seen to use sticks and tools more often than females. When studied, it was clear that females use tools at the same rate as males for the first 10 months, but after that, due to environmental surroundings, they use sticks less and less compared to males.

This use of tools is a well-defined trait in black-striped capuchins and has been traced back over three thousand years. This is so well defined that the forearm muscles in black-striped capuchins are well defined for complex tool use.

In their natural environment, black-striped capuchins are diurnal and spend much of their day travelling in search of food, especially since they live in drier areas. This leads them to spend more time travelling terrestrially, primarily quadrupedally and rarely walking bipedally to use tools.

== Diet ==
The diet consists of a wide range of foods. Fruits, nuts, insects, small vertebrates, flowers, and leaves. From this variety they especially eat fruits.

== Distribution ==
The black-striped capuchin can be found in northern and central Brazil. Specifically, in the Cerrados, Caatingas, and Pantanal of Brazil.
