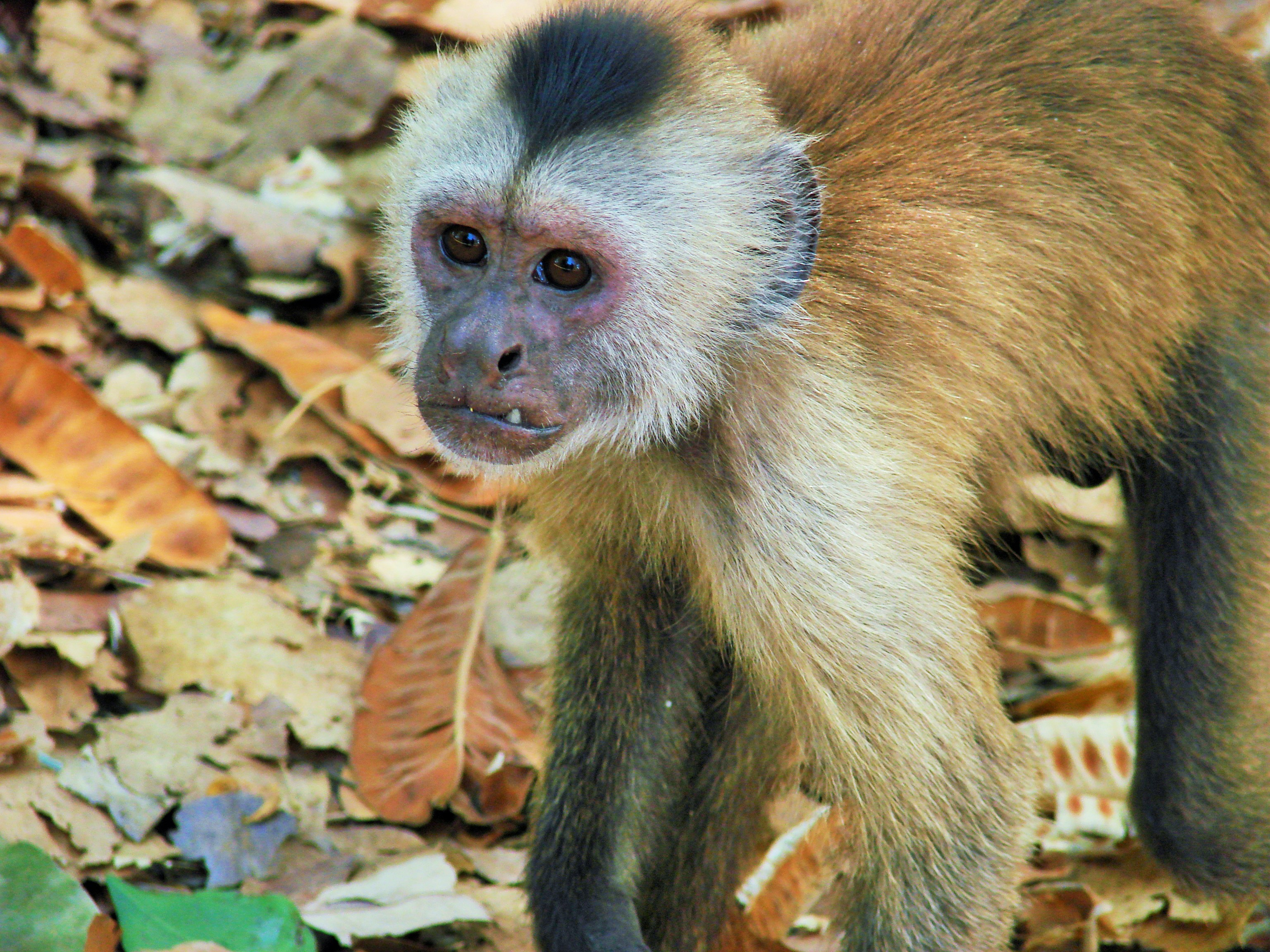

Conservation status
- Endangered (IUCN 3.1)

Scientific classification
- Kingdom: Animalia
- Phylum: Chordata
- Class: Mammalia
- Infraclass: Placentalia
- Order: Primates
- Family: Cebidae
- Genus: Cebus
- Species: C. brunneus

Binomial name
- Cebus brunneus (Allen, 1914)

= Brown weeper capuchin =

Species of New World monkey

The brown weeper capuchin (Cebus brunneus) or Venezuelan brown capuchin is a species of gracile capuchin monkey endemic to Venezuela, although some sources also consider it to occur on Trinidad.

== Taxonomy ==
This taxon had previously been considered to be both Cebus albifrons trinitanus and C. olivaceus, and in 1981 had been interpreted doubtfully distinct and likely conspecific with C. capucinus by some taxonomists. Boubli, Mittermeier and Rylands considered the taxon to be called C. olivaceus ssp. brunneus when they wrote the IUCN Red List assessment in 2008, classifying the subspecies within the Guianan weeper capuchin.

In 2012, Boubli et al., found divergences in mitochondrial DNA of C. brunneus to be significant enough to recognise it as a separate species, and also synonymized the Trinidad white-fronted capuchin (C. trinitatis) with it based on the mitochondrial genes of the single sampled specimen. However, subsequent morphological inspection of the C. brunneus specimens used for the study found them to be distinct from the actual type specimen of C. brunneus. Although the American Society of Mammalogists still recognizes the Trinidad capuchins as conspecific with C. brunneus, the ITIS recognizes them as a subspecies of Humboldt's white-fronted capuchin (C. albifrons).

== Description ==
The brown weeper capuchin has brown, thick fur with a dark wedge on the forehead and lighter face, cheeks and chin. Its head and body are about 42 centimetres (17 in) with a 44 cm (17 in) tail.

The different species known as white-fronted capuchins are extremely difficult to tell apart, and also appear to intergrade with each other where different taxa meet, as well as other Cebus taxa recognised as distinct. C. brunneus may be conspecific with white-faced capuchins, which often cannot reliably be distinguished from it physically.

== Distribution and habitat ==
It lives in various types of forest in the Cordillera de la Costa in northern Venezuela, in dry semi-deciduous forests and gallery forests in the Western Venezuelan Llanos, as well as in Trinidad (under the assumption that the Trinidad white-fronted capuchin is synonymous).

== Tool use ==
Trinidad white-fronted capuchins have been observed using leaves as cups to drink water from tree cavities. The leaves used were modified before by changing the shape of the leaf. The leaves are discarded after one use, meaning that a different leaf is used for repeat visits. These observations suggest that, like the common chimpanzee, wild capuchins demonstrate tool manufacture and use in foraging-related contexts.
