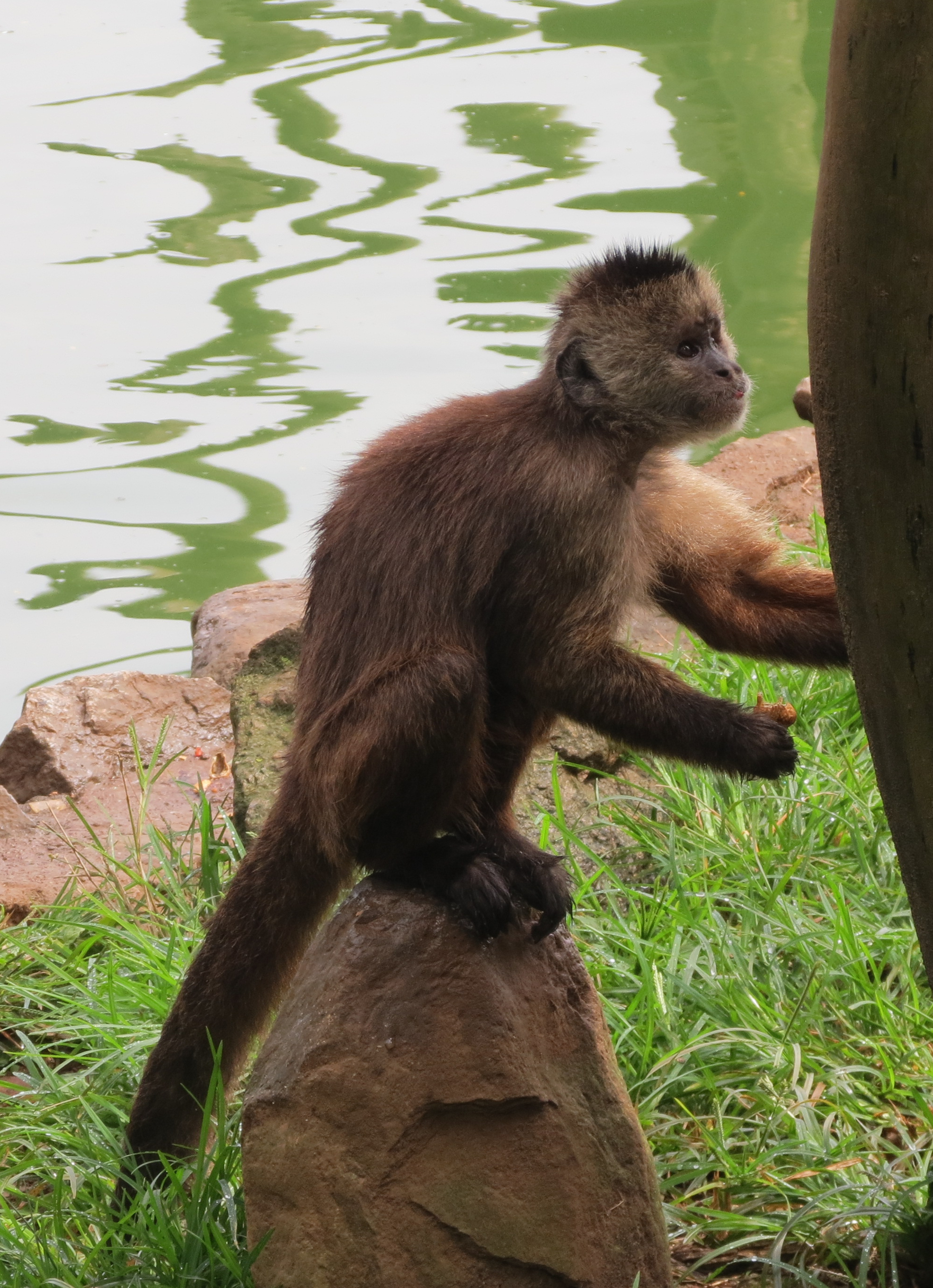
- At the São Paulo Zoo

Conservation status
- Least Concern (IUCN 3.1)

Scientific classification
- Kingdom: Animalia
- Phylum: Chordata
- Class: Mammalia
- Infraclass: Placentalia
- Order: Primates
- Family: Cebidae
- Genus: Cebus
- Species: C. olivaceus

Binomial name
- Cebus olivaceus Schomburgk, 1848
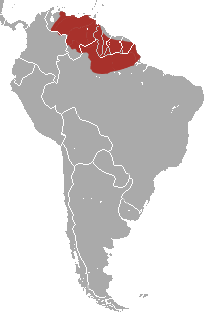
- Geographic range

Synonyms
- Cebus annellatus Gray, 1865; Cebus apiculatus Elliot, 1907; Cebus castaneus I. Geoffroy Saint-Hilaire, 1851; Cebus nigrivittatus Wagner, 1848; Cebus capucinus leporinus Pusch, 1941

= Wedge-capped capuchin =

Species of New World monkey

The wedge-capped capuchin or Guianan weeper capuchin (Cebus olivaceus) is a capuchin monkey from South America. It is found in northern Brazil, Guyana and Venezuela. Cebus olivaceus is known to dwell in tall, primary forest and travel over long distances during the day.

These primates are medium-sized monkeys with distinctive "wedge cap" markings on their head and slightly longer limbs than other capuchins for jumping through the forest canopy. Similar to other capuchin monkeys, the diet of wedge-capped capuchin primarily consists of fruits, invertebrates, other plant parts, and on rare occasions small vertebrates. They have also been known to rub millipedes against their fur, especially in the rainy seasons, as a potential means of mosquito repellent.

Cebus olivaceus is a polygamous species that lives in groups of anywhere from 5-30 individuals with female-biased sex ratios. The group is organized according to a pre-determined hierarchal system of dominance for both males and females. Although biological lineage is less of a factor of dominance for males than it is for females, due to male migration between groups. Wedge-capped capuchin partake in several behavioral mechanisms to assert and maintain dominance within the group including: infanticide, when an infant is deliberately killed; grooming, used to facilitate social rapport; and alloparenting, which is when members of the group care for offspring that are not their own.

The wedge-capped capuchin is listed as Least Concern in the IUCN Red List.

== Taxonomy ==
The genus Cebus is divided into several different species. However, taxonomists argue over the specific divisions within the genus, which are uncertain and controversial. The chestnut capuchin (C. castaneus) of northeastern Brazil, southern Guyana, French Guiana, and Suriname, as well as the brown weeper capuchin (C. brunneus) of northern Venezuela, were both previously considered subspecies of the wedge-capped capuchin, together being referred to as the weeper capuchin. However, a 2012 study found grounds to separate them as distinct species from one another, although this taxonomy is still highly contentious. The American Society of Mammalogists, IUCN Red List, and ITIS all follow this taxonomy, although only tentatively.

== Description ==
=== Size and physical description ===
Adult wedge-capped capuchins weigh approximately 3 kg (6.6 lb), but weight varies moderately with sex. They receive their name from a black triangle of dark fur centered on their foreheads. Generally this species is light brown to brown with yellow and gray tinges on varying parts of their bodies. Their "wedge cap" starts between the eyes and extends backwards to cover the top of the head. Their faces are hairless and surrounded by light brown or blonde fur.

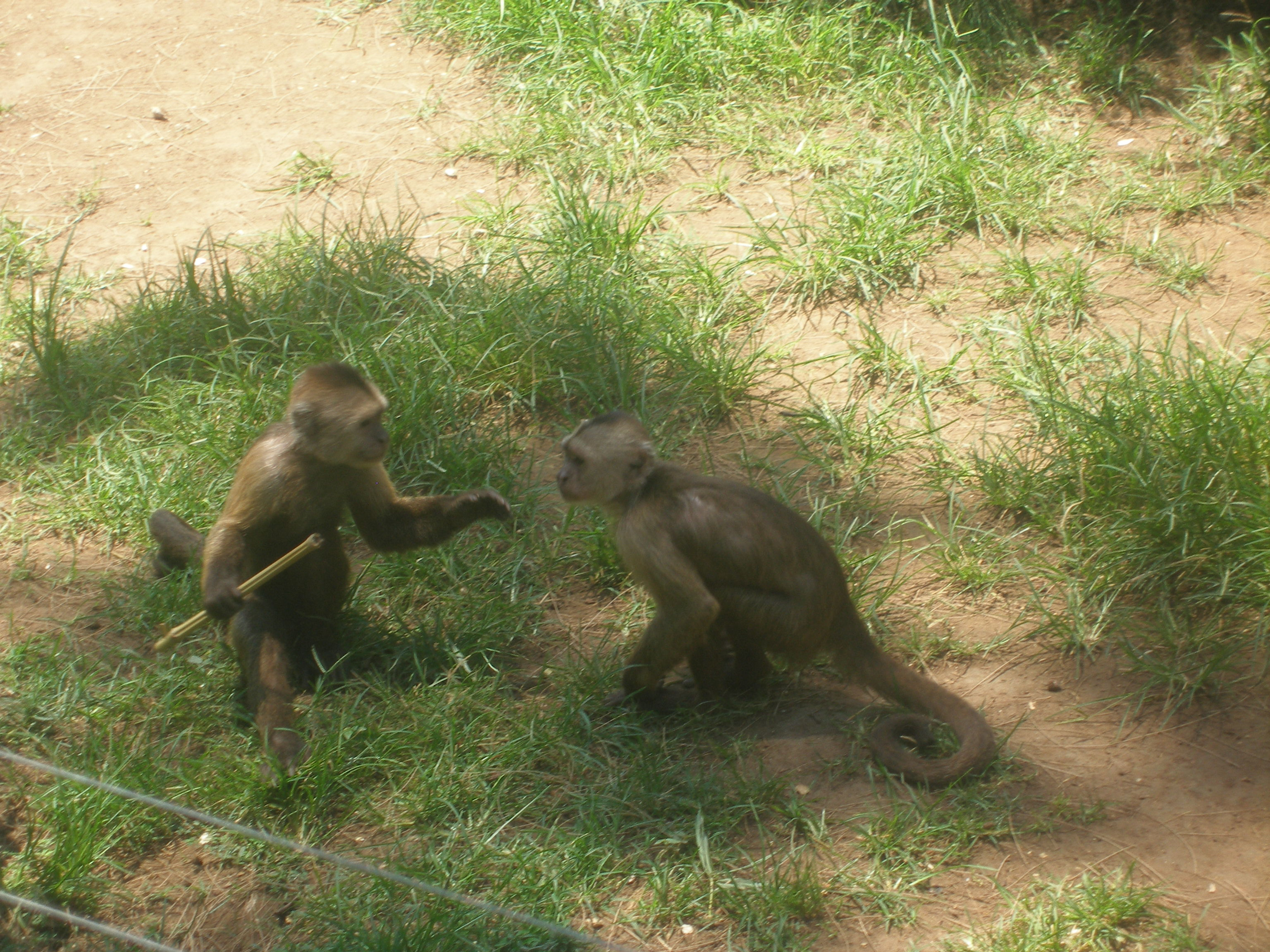
At the Ramat Gan Safari, Tel Aviv District, Israel.

Wedge-capped capuchins show similar levels of sexual dimorphism as other capuchin monkeys. On average, males weigh about 30% more than females. Additionally, males have relatively longer canines than females (even after overall body size is accounted for). Male maxillary and mandibular (upper and lower) canines of males are on average 70% and 40% larger than female canines respectively. This may be indicative of male competition for females.

=== Locomotion and morphology ===
Wedge-capped capuchins have been compared to tufted capuchins to discern the relationship between locomotion and skeletal proportions. Wedge-capped capuchins spent relatively more time running and jumping through the forest canopy while tufted capuchins spent more time walking and moving slowly. As such, wedge-capped capuchins have relatively longer limbs (particularly the hind limbs) than tufted capuchins.

== Phylogeny ==
Due to large physical variations in Cebus, taxonomists have frequently debated the exact classifications and details of the genus. However, most agree that the wedge-capped capuchin shares the genus with four others: C. apella, C. albifrons, C. capucinus, and C. kaapori. The wedge-capped capuchin has a diploid chromosome number of 52, though some others in the genus have 54 chromosomes. Nine human chromosomes correspond to those of the C. olivaceus. Phylogenetic analysis and constructions of cladograms have demonstrated that the wedge-capped capuchin is closely related to C. apella.

== Habitat and range ==
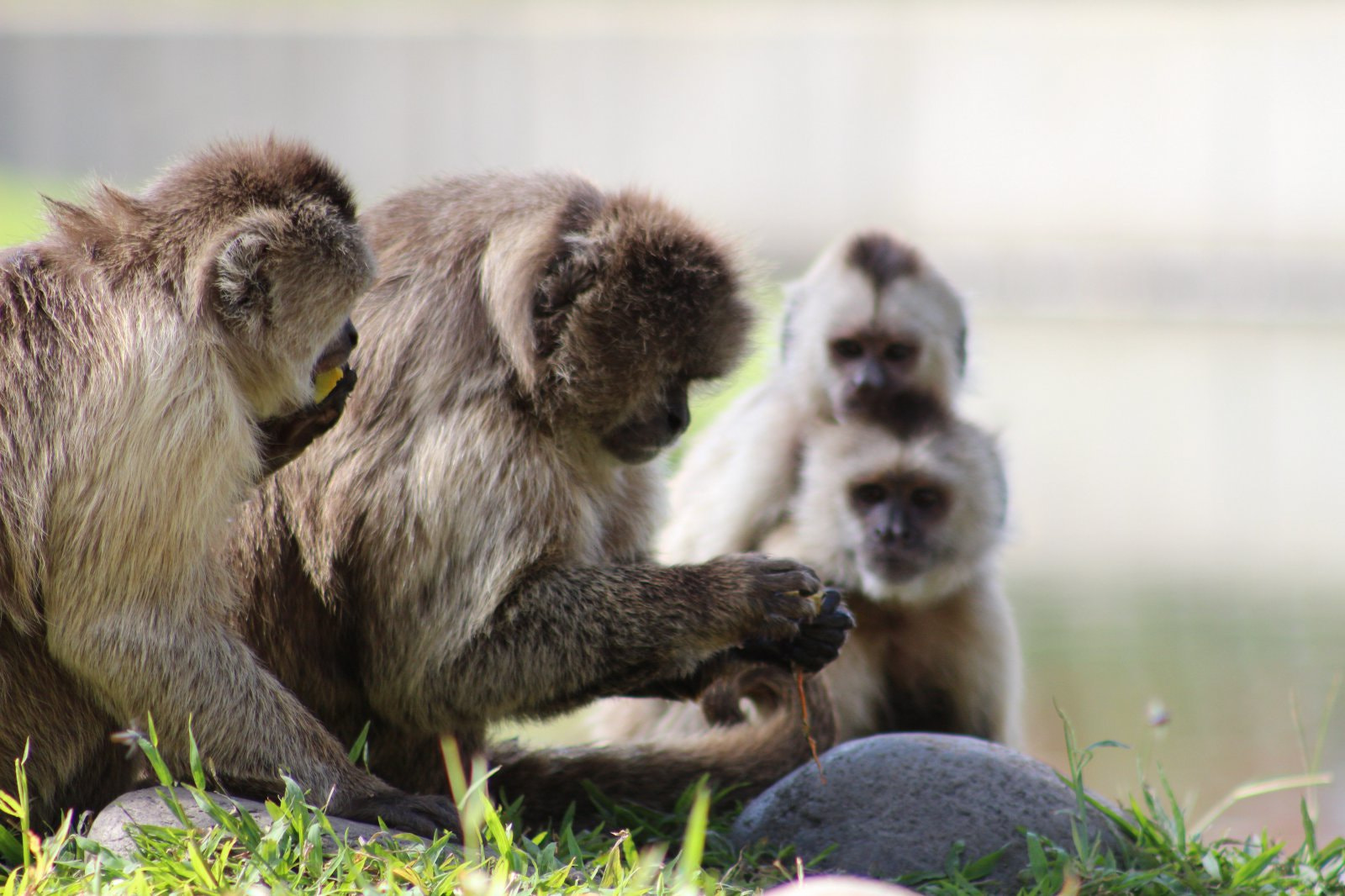
Weeper Capuchins In Caracas, Venezuela

Wedge-capped capuchins prefer undisturbed primary forests in which they can move through the canopy (locomotion and limb morphology). They occupy the rainforests of northern Brazil and Venezuela, as well as the drier forests along riverbeds in Guyana. These habitats vary in terms of forest height, composition, and continuity. When wedge-capped capuchins have the option between dense high-canopy primary forests and more fragmented, lower forests, they generally inhabit the primary forests. They are found north of the Orinoco River, south of the Sierra de Perijá and Venezuelan Coastal Range, and east to the Essequibo River in western Guyana.

== Diet ==
Wedge-capped capuchins are omnivorous and eat both animal and plant foods. Foraging behavior varies seasonally, as well as with age and sex. In general, these monkeys spend approximately equal amounts of time exploiting animal and plant resources. The exception to this are infants that spend far more time foraging for plants foods than animals. Most of the plant food consumed is ripe fruit, the majority of which are figs, but also palm nuts, seeds, berries, flowering buds, shoots, barks and gums. Their animal prey is almost exclusively invertebrates. Their prey consists of snails, arachnids, wasps, caterpillars, grasshoppers, ants, birds eggs, other small mammals and many insects that inhabit palm crowns. Some coastal populations may also include oysters, crabs, and other marine life in their diet.

While males and females spend about the same amount of time foraging for insects, they exploit different types of resources. Males spend more time searching for insects on the surface of branches, while females search for most of their insects atop palm trees. There is little variation in plant material consumed between males and females. Also, adults and sub-adults eat more animal material than juveniles and infants.

=== Food washing ===
Food washing has been observed in non-human primates including macaques and capuchins. The primates will sometimes wash their sandy fruits and foods prior to eating them. This act has been described as an example of protoculture. Wedge-capped capuchins were shown to wash sandy food in four spontaneous occasions in both captive and wild populations. Urbani found that food washing was a response to certain circumstantial problems and not through imitation or learning, as argued in studies of other species.

== Behavior ==
Wedge-capped capuchins live in groups ranging from as few as 5 individuals to more than 30 individuals. The groups generally consist of one reproductively active adult male, several adult females and their offspring, and, in some cases, non-reproductive adult males. Juveniles generally make up about 50% of a groups population. The population structure is heavily skewed toward females. There are approximately 2 females to every male at birth. This ratio increases to more than 4 adult females for every adult male. This is the result of both female-biased birth ratios and male migration behavior.

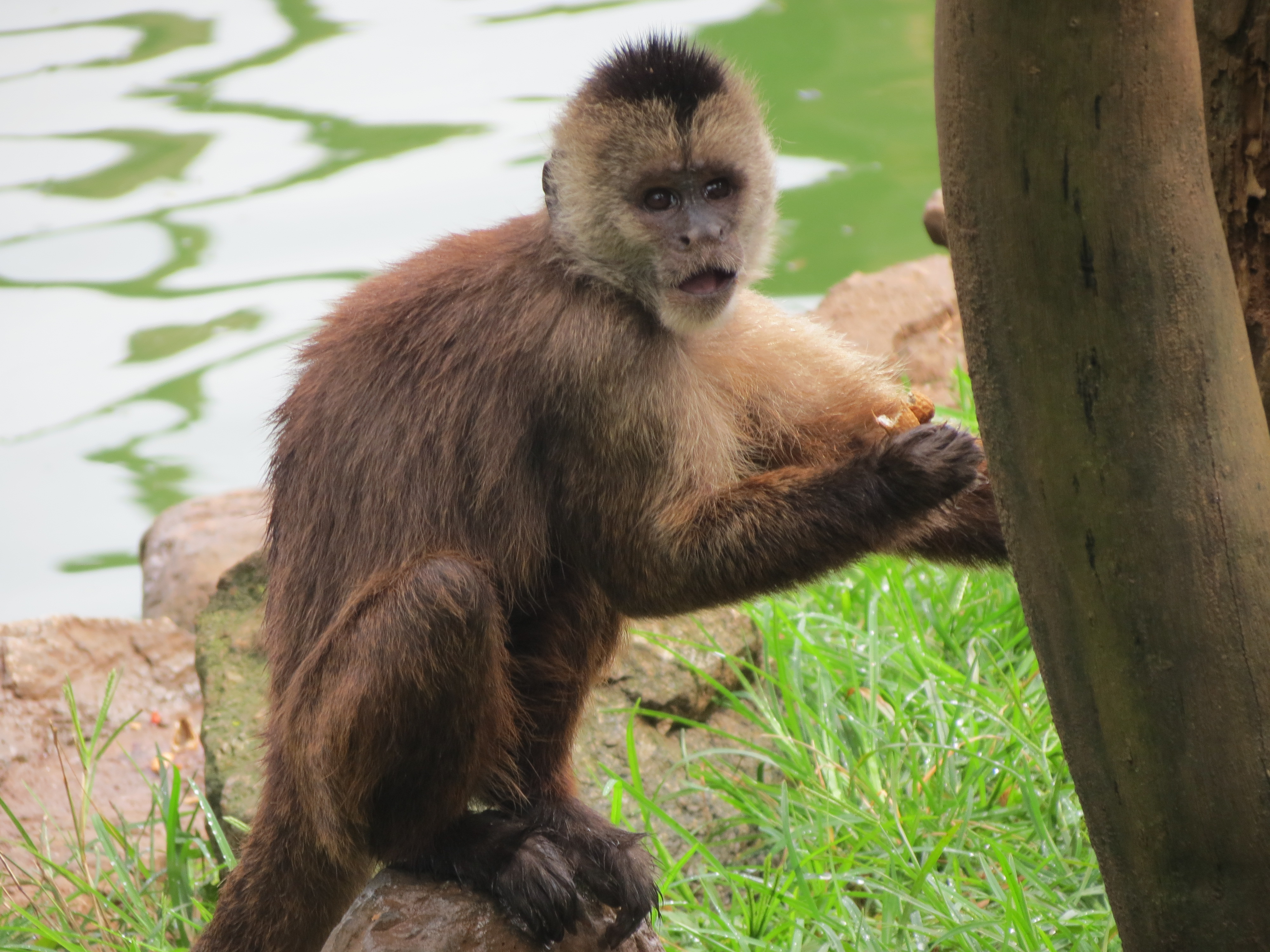
A wedge-capped capuchin in São Paulo Zoo.

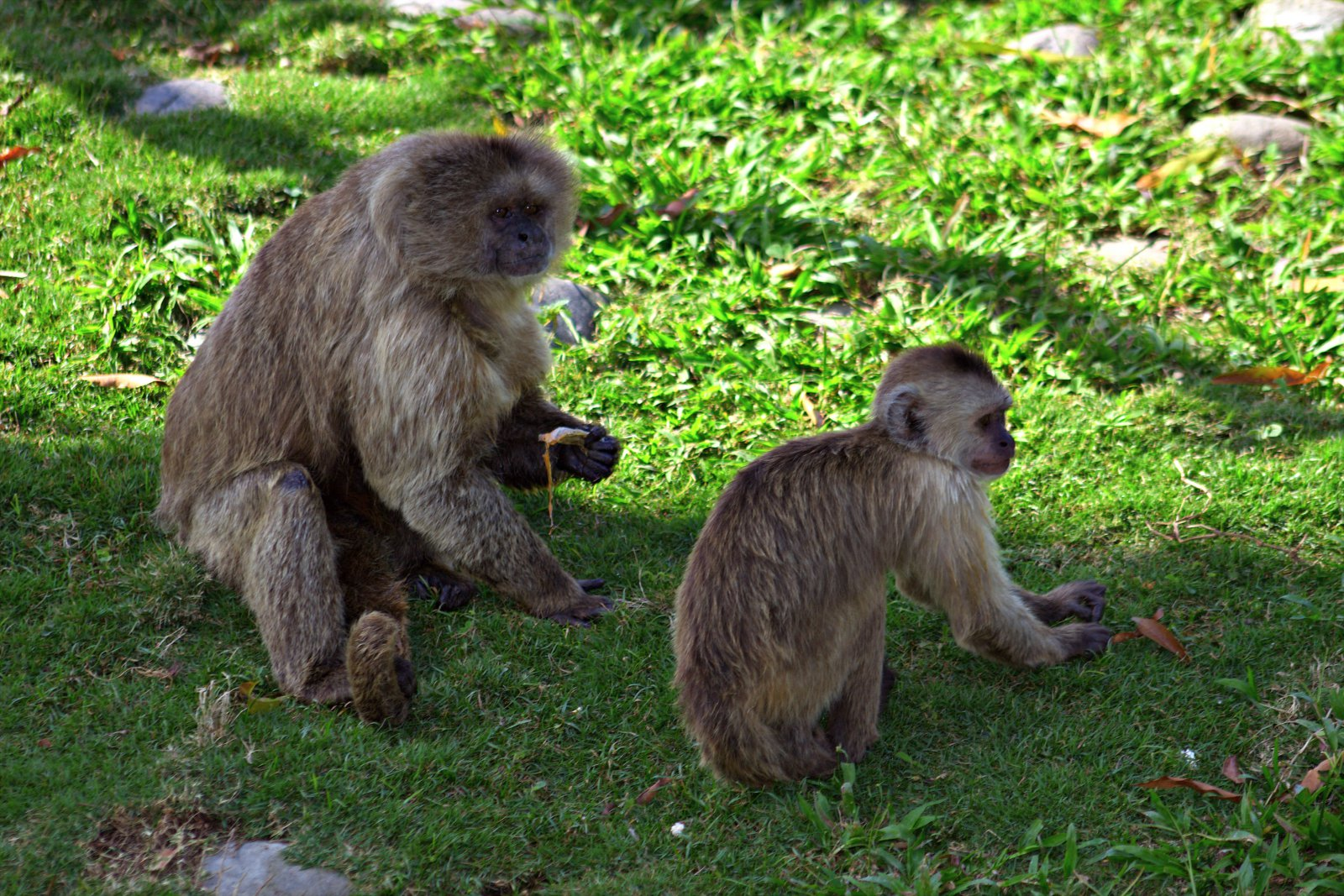
2 Wedge-capped capuchins in parque del este, caracas, Venezuela.

Birthrate in wedge-capped capuchins varies with age. Younger and middle-aged females (6 to 26 years old) give birth as often as once every two years. Older females (older than 26 years) may only give birth once every three or four years. Both male and female wedge-capped capuchins live as long as 36 years.

In wedge-capped capuchins, males emigrate from their natal groups while females generally remain in the same group for the majority of their lives. Males generally leave their natal group between 3 and 6 years of age. Young males spend little time alone after leaving their natal groups and quickly integrate into a new group. Males prefer to join groups with a high ratio of females to adult males, as this maximizes their probability for future mating success. Immigrating males generally meet little opposition when joining a new group. Older females may migrate to new groups on rare occasions.

=== Infanticide ===
Infanticide, or the deliberate killing of an infant, in any non-human primate is of considerable interest to ecologists because it can affect the particular primate's reproductive success and ultimately lead to great demographic changes within the primate's troop. Infanticide has been observed in C. olivaceus.

Genetically, it may pay for a male wedge-capped capuchin to kill an unrelated newborn, so that he can then mate with the mother sooner than if the baby was still alive. This allows the male to propagate his genes faster through the troop. However, in Valderrama's research, the infanticidal male gained reproductive success from the killing in only one of the three cases studied. High-ranking females' infants were targeted in all three cases. The variability surrounding the infanticide among the three cases studied is characteristic surrounding infanticide among any other non-human primates.

=== Dominance hierarchy ===
Both male and female wedge-capped capuchins have a dominance hierarchy. Female status is often established based on matrilines, with dominant mothers tending to have dominant daughters. Male dominance is not as easily passed from one generation to the next due to male migration.

This dominance hierarchy is particularly helpful in explaining female-initiated agonistic behavior. Females higher in the hierarchy tend to be more aggressive toward both females and males that are lower on their respective dominance hierarchies. Aggressive behavior includes lunging, vocalization, and chasing. Sometimes many females chase males together. Male aggression was not correlated with position in the dominance hierarchy. Male aggression toward females is generally limited to vocalizations, lunging, and chasing. On one occasion, however, an adult male was observed to attack and kill a young adult female from the same group. This level of aggression is not the norm, usually being practiced in the animal kingdom as a method of takeover.

=== Grooming ===
Grooming behavior plays an important role in the group dynamics of wedge-capped capuchins. Grooming may be a way for both sub-adult males and females to integrate themselves into the adult social structure. This has been particularly well-documented in female-female interactions. Sub-adult females rarely groom each other, but rather focus their attention on grooming older females. These young females, who stay in their natal groups, must develop relationships with adult females to assimilate into the adult female social structure. In these instances, young females often seek out grooming opportunities with adult females. The adult females who are the recipients of this behavior are generally less enthusiastic about the interaction than their younger counterparts. This may indicate that adult females gain little benefit from these grooming interactions compared with sub-adult females. Sub-adult females may support their older companions in aggressive interactions. Young females that fail to establish relationships with older females become peripheral to the group and lose access to resources.

Grooming behavior among adult females has a different pattern. Contrary to the normal pattern in primates, females often groom individuals who are lower in rank than they are. This may be largely due to the presence of two different grooming strategies among adult female wedge-capped capuchins. One of these strategies is referred to as appeasement. Subordinate females, when approached by dominant females, will lie down and solicit grooming. This has been interpreted as a way to avoid aggressive behavior from the dominant female. Interactions where a dominant female approaches a subordinate one often end in aggressive behavior, and soliciting grooming is a way to diffuse that aggression. This form of grooming is usually not reciprocated by the subordinate female.

The other form of grooming behavior among adult females is affiliative. In contrast to grooming as appeasement, affiliative grooming is dependent on reciprocation. These interactions usually occur between individuals that hold high or intermediate positions in the dominance hierarchy. This form of grooming helps establish alliances between females that may provide both social and material advantages.

=== Alloparenting ===
Allomaternal care, where an individual other than an infant's mother helps care for it, is common in wedge-capped capuchins. There are several behaviors associated with allomaternal care in these monkeys, including nursing and carrying the infant. For the first three months after birth, infants are cared for exclusively by their mothers. However, allomaternal care dramatically increases during the next three months of development to the point where infants generally receive less care from their mothers than from other females. Siblings provide far more care for infants than non-related individuals. Additionally, high-ranking females interact more often with the infants of low-ranking females than vice versa. Allomaternal care is provided most often by juveniles and young adults. Adult females participate far less in alloparental care. This is common among many primate groups and indicates that young females may gain valuable experience in raising infants that will help them in the future.

Allomaternal nursing (wet nursing) is common in wedge-capped capuchins but very rare among other primates. Even more interesting is that this nursing behavior in wedge-capped capuchins is not correlated with relatedness. This behavior may be an example of reciprocity, where the favor of one female nursing another's infant is eventually returned.

Parasitic nursing has also been observed in wedge-capped capuchins. In these instances, juvenile and young adult females, who are usually higher in the dominance hierarchy, nurse from older females of lower rank. In contrast to allomaternal behavior, parasitic nursing does not appear to give any benefits to the monkey providing the milk.

=== Interaction with other species ===
Wedge-capped capuchins sometimes rub themselves with millipedes they find while foraging. The monkeys rub the millipede against their fur, sometimes for as long as two minutes at a time. They also occasionally put the millipede in their mouths, remove them, and continue to rub them over their bodies. These capuchins often share these millipedes. The purpose of this strange behavior is difficult to determine. One theory is that the millipede, when threatened, releases noxious chemicals as a defense mechanism. These chemicals may act as insect repellants against mosquitos. This behavior is most common during the rainy season, when mosquitos are most prevalent.

== Predation ==
Wedge-capped capuchins have been observed to give alarm calls if they observe a potential predator. Such predators include jaguars, ocelots, tayras, boa constrictors, caimans, and collared peccaries. In addition, alarm calls have been observed when the capuchin sees one of several birds, such as hook-billed kites, black vultures, green ibises, rufous-vented chachalacas, harpy eagles, or ornate hawk-eagles. Due to these predators, the wedge-capped capuchin has taken to living in groups; as group size increases, vigilance per animal decreases, though it has not yet been demonstrated that capuchins in larger groups are any less vulnerable than those in smaller groups.

=== Threats and conservation status ===
Wedge-capped capuchins are ranked as an animal of least concern on the IUCN Red List of Threatened Species. The wedge-capped capuchin is least concern because it is common and has a widespread range. Its population is considered stable, with no evidence of widespread decline. Habitat loss is the main threat to the species; there is minimal evidence of hunting.
