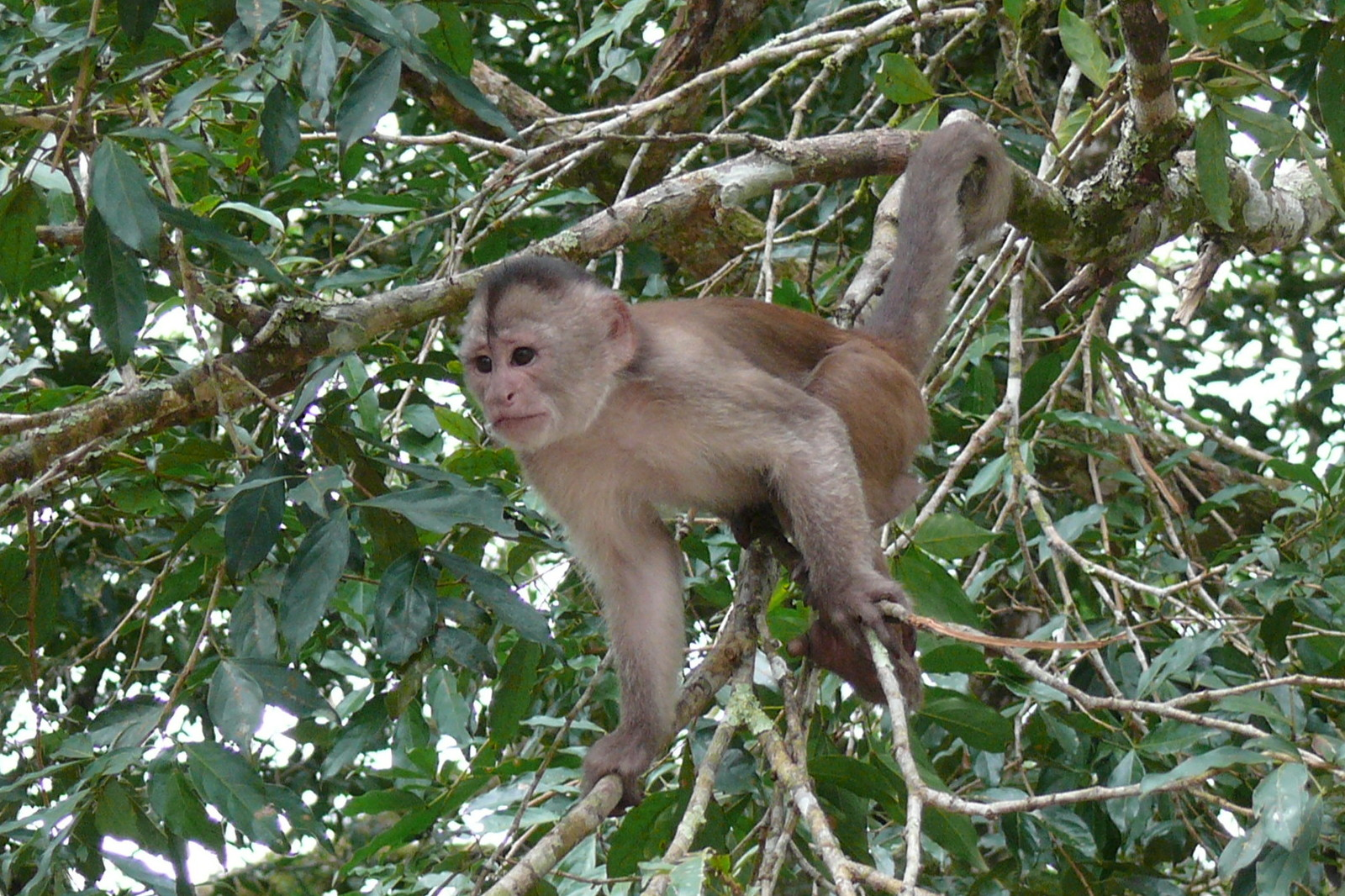

Conservation status
- Near Threatened (IUCN 3.1)

Scientific classification
- Kingdom: Animalia
- Phylum: Chordata
- Class: Mammalia
- Infraclass: Placentalia
- Order: Primates
- Family: Cebidae
- Genus: Cebus
- Species: C. yuracus

Binomial name
- Cebus yuracus (Hershkovitz, 1949)

= Marañón white-fronted capuchin =

Species of New World monkey

The Marañón white-fronted capuchin (Cebus yuracus) also or known as Peruvian white-fronted capuchin or Andean white-fronted capuchin is a species of gracile capuchin monkey from the upper Amazon Basin. It had been regarded as synonymous with the shock-headed capuchin (C. cuscinus), which was then considered a subspecies of Humboldt's white-fronted capuchin, but it was classified as a separate species by Mittermeier and Rylands based on genetic studies by Boubli.

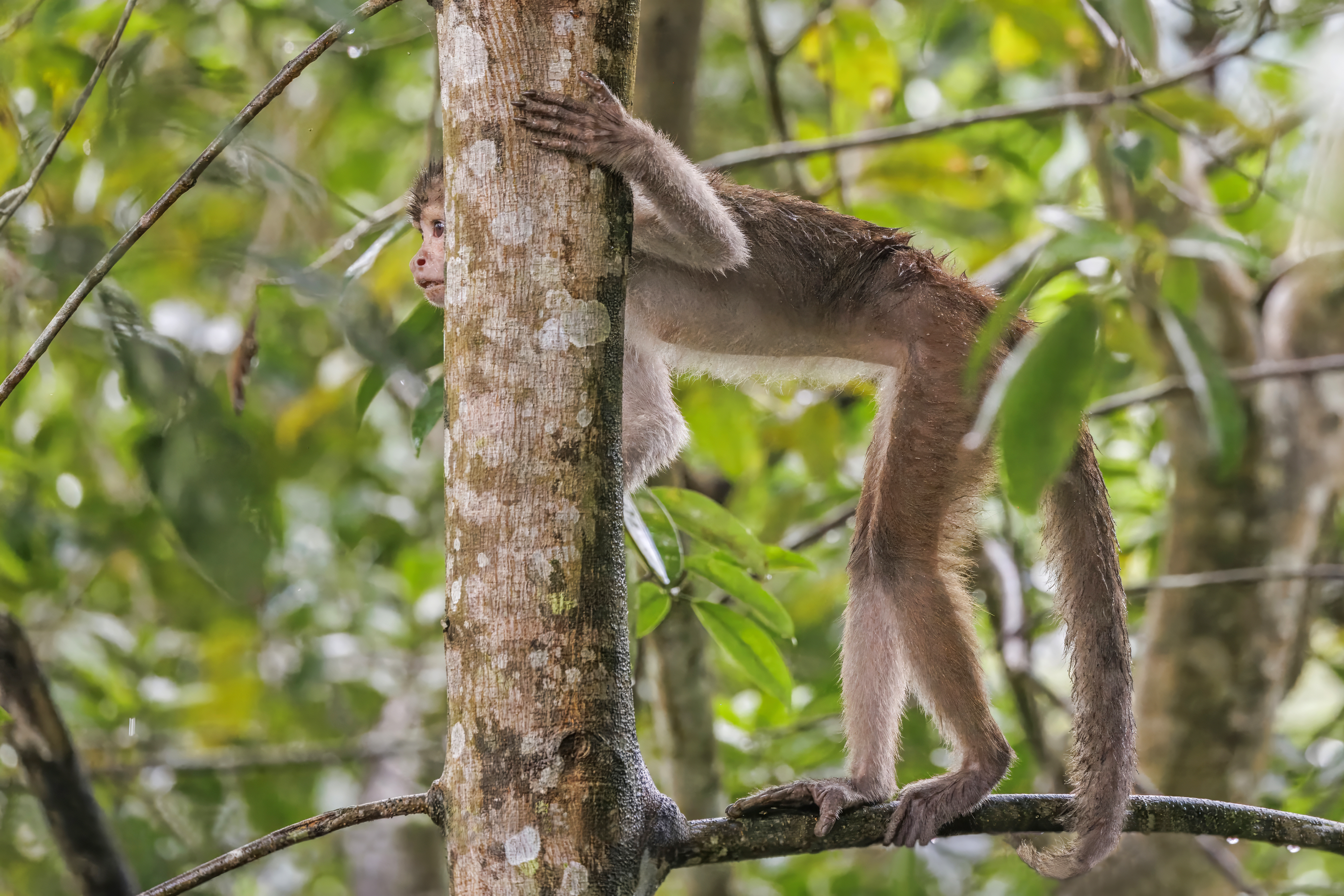
Near Rio Napo, Sucumbios, Ecuador

The Marañón white-fronted capuchin lives in wet forests of the upper Amazon basin in southern Colombia, eastern Ecuador, northeastern Peru and likely eastern Brazil. Males have a head and body length of about 43 cm (17 in) with a tail length of about 47 cm (19 in). Females have a head and body length about 37 cm (15 in) with a tail length of about 45 cm (18 in).

Marañón white-fronted capuchins sometimes formed mixed groups with the Ecuadorian squirrel monkey.
