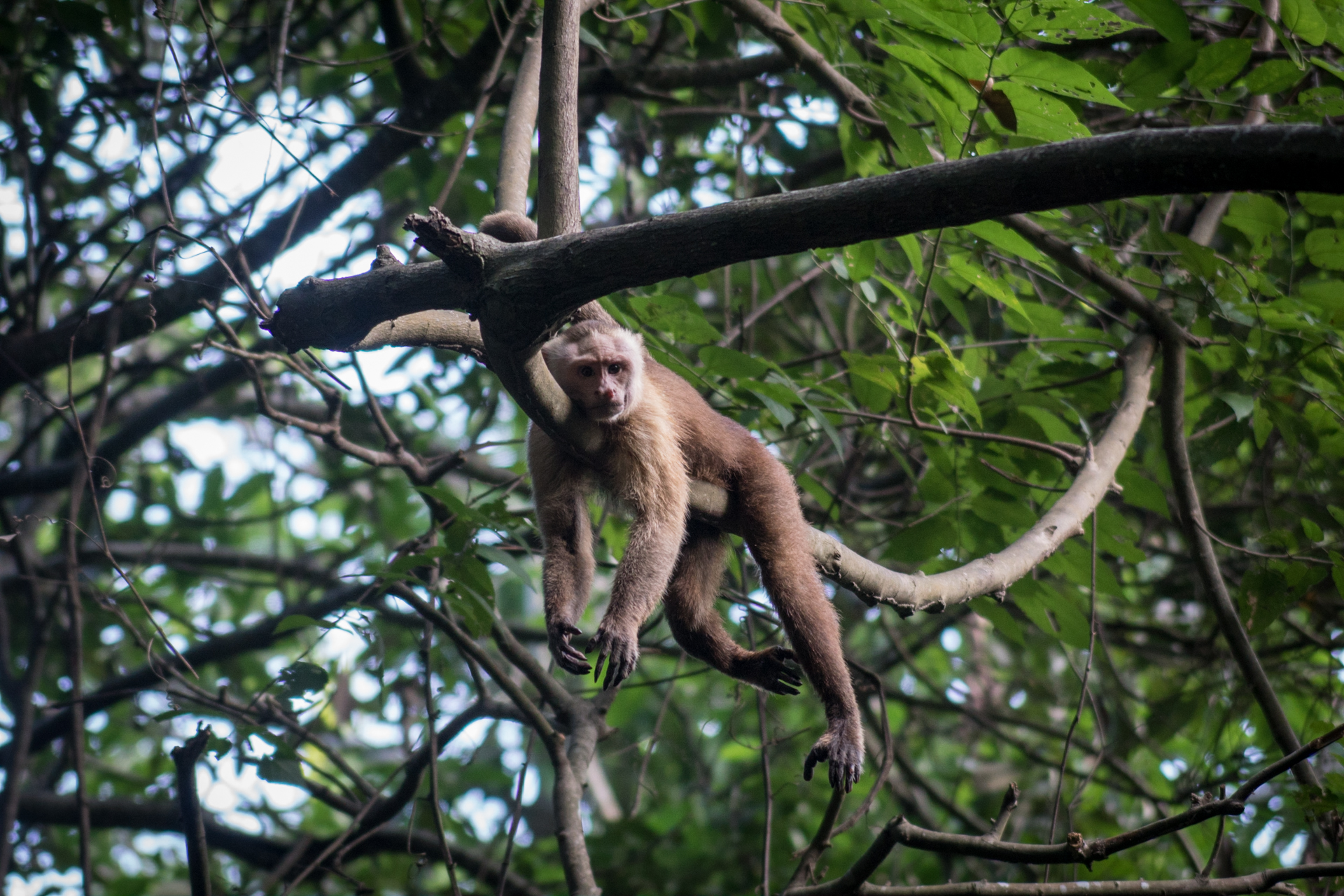

Conservation status
- Endangered (IUCN 3.1)

Scientific classification
- Kingdom: Animalia
- Phylum: Chordata
- Class: Mammalia
- Infraclass: Placentalia
- Order: Primates
- Family: Cebidae
- Genus: Cebus
- Species: C. malitiosus

Binomial name
- Cebus malitiosus (Elliot, 1909)

= Santa Marta white-fronted capuchin =

Species of New World monkey

The Santa Marta white-fronted capuchin (Cebus malitiosus) is a species of gracile capuchin monkey from Colombia. It was formerly considered a subspecies of the Cebus albifrons or a synonym of the Colombian white-faced capuchin (C. capucinus), but Mittermeier and Rylands elevated it to a species in 2013, following previous work by Rylands, Hershkovitz, Cooper and Hernandez-Camacho. The IUCN follows this taxonomy.

The Santa Marta white-fronted capuchin range is restricted to forests near the northwest base of the Sierra Nevada de Santa Marta in northern Colombia. Males have a head and body about 45.7 cm (18.0 in) long and a tail about 43.3 cm (17.0 in) long.
