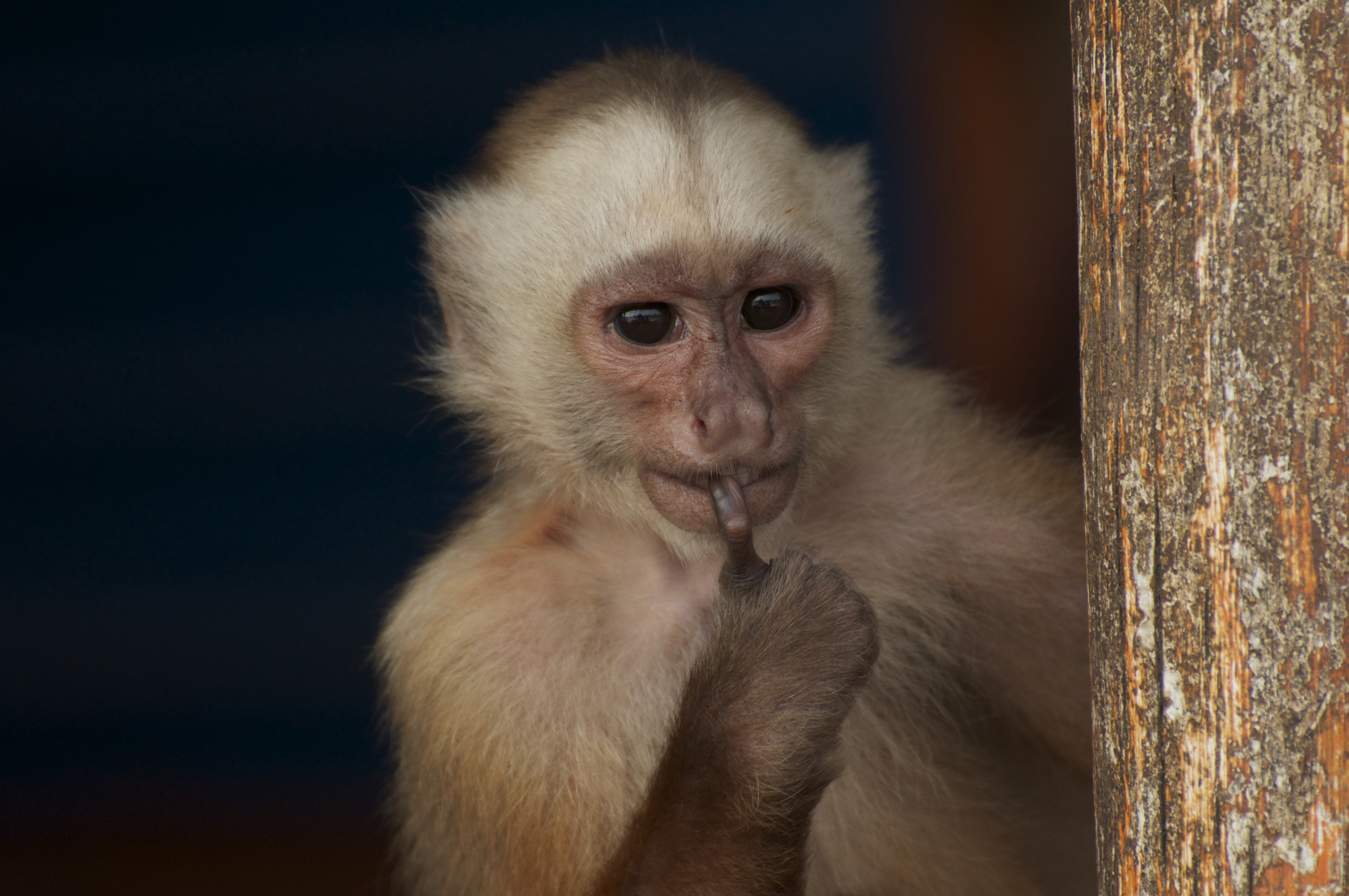

Conservation status
- Vulnerable (IUCN 3.1)

Scientific classification
- Kingdom: Animalia
- Phylum: Chordata
- Class: Mammalia
- Infraclass: Placentalia
- Order: Primates
- Family: Cebidae
- Genus: Cebus
- Species: C. leucocephalus

Binomial name
- Cebus leucocephalus (Gray, 1866)

= Sierra de Perijá white-fronted capuchin =

Species of New World monkey

The Sierra de Perijá white-fronted capuchin (Cebus leucocephalus) is a species of gracile capuchin monkey from Colombia and Venezuela. It had formerly been regarded as a subspecies of the Humboldt's white-fronted capuchin but was reclassified by Mittermeier and Rylands as a separate species in 2013, based on genetic studies by Jean Boubli.

The range of the Sierra de Perijá white-fronted capuchin is restricted to the forests in a portion of northern Colombia and northwest Venezuela. Males have a head and body that ranges between 37 and 40.7 cm (14.6 and 16.0 in) with a tail length of between 39.2 and 49.9 mm (1.54 and 1.96 in).
