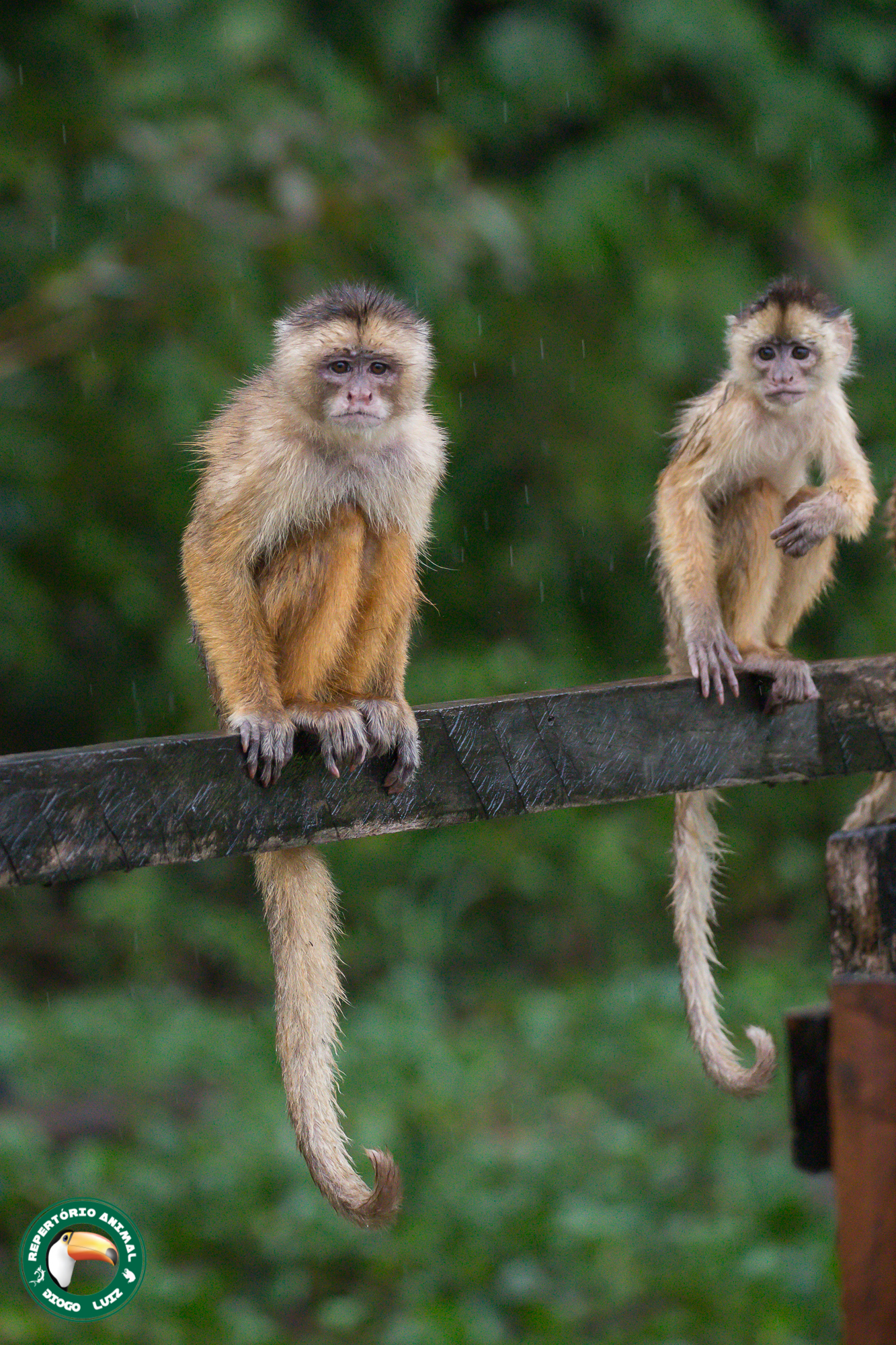

Conservation status
- Vulnerable (IUCN 3.1)

Scientific classification
- Kingdom: Animalia
- Phylum: Chordata
- Class: Mammalia
- Infraclass: Placentalia
- Order: Primates
- Family: Cebidae
- Genus: Cebus
- Species: C. unicolor

Binomial name
- Cebus unicolor (Spix, 1823)

= Spix's white-fronted capuchin =

Species of New World monkey

Spix's white-fronted capuchin (Cebus unicolor) is a species of gracile capuchin monkey. It had previously been classified as a subspecies of the Humboldt's white-fronted capuchin (C. albifrons). Following genetic studies by Boubli, et al, Mittermeier and Ryland elevated it to a full species.

Spix's white-fronted capuchin has a wide range within the upper Amazon Basin in Brazil and Peru. It also occurs in northern Bolivia. It has a head and body length between 36.5 and 37.5 cm (14.4 and 14.8 in) and a tail length of between 42 and 46 cm (17 and 18 in).
