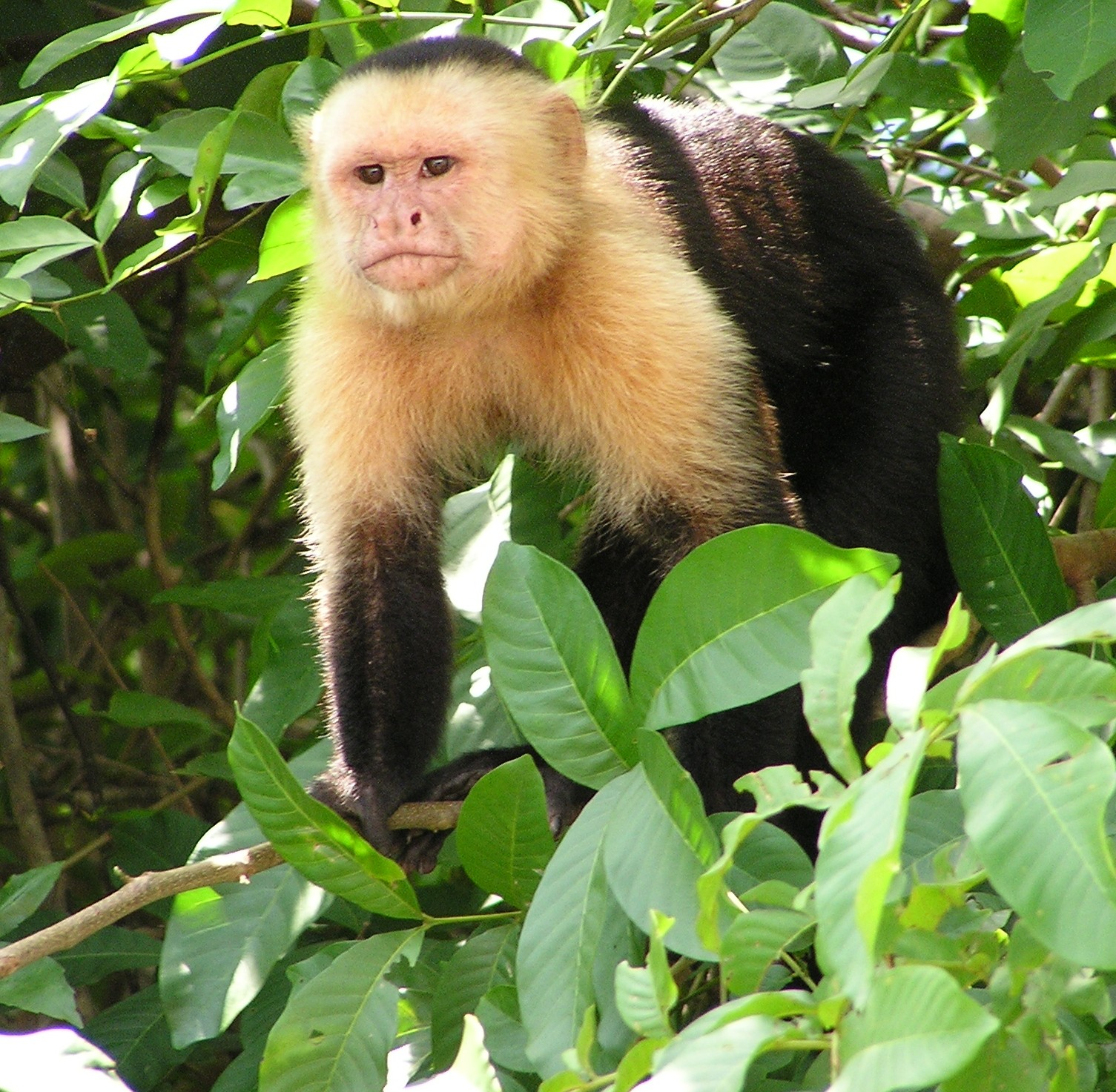
- Panamanian white-headed capuchin (Cebus imitator)

Scientific classification
- Kingdom: Animalia
- Phylum: Chordata
- Class: Mammalia
- Order: Primates
- Family: Cebidae
- Subfamily: Cebinae
- Genus: Cebus; Brisson, 1762

Type species
- Simia capucina Linnaeus, 1758

Species
- Cebus aequatorialis Cebus albifrons Cebus brunneus Cebus capucinus Cebus castaneus Cebus cesarae Cebus cuscinus Cebus imitator Cebus kaapori Cebus leucocephalus Cebus malitiosus Cebus olivaceus Cebus trinitatis Cebus unicolor Cebus versicolor Cebus yuracus

= Gracile capuchin monkey =

Genus of mammals New World monkeys

Gracile capuchin monkeys are capuchin monkeys in the genus Cebus. At one time all capuchin monkeys were included within the genus Cebus. In 2011, Jessica Lynch Alfaro et al. proposed splitting the genus between the robust capuchin monkeys, such as the tufted capuchin, and the gracile capuchins. The gracile capuchins retain the genus name Cebus, while the robust species have been transferred to Sapajus.

== Taxonomy ==
Following Groves (2005), taxa within the genus Cebus include:

- White-fronted capuchin, Cebus albifrons
  - Ecuadorian capuchin, Cebus albifrons aequatorialis
  - Humboldt's white-fronted capuchin, Cebus albifrons albifrons
  - Shock-headed capuchin, Cebus albifrons cuscinus
  - Trinidad white-fronted capuchin, Cebus albifrons trinitatis
  - Spix's white-fronted capuchin, Cebus albifrons unicolor
  - Varied capuchin, Cebus albifrons versicolor
- White-headed capuchin or white-faced capuchin, Cebus capucinus
- Kaapori capuchin, Cebus kaapori
- Wedge-capped capuchin, Cebus olivaceus

Subsequent revisions have split some of these into additional species:

- Colombian white-faced capuchin or Colombian white-headed capuchin, Cebus capucinus
- Panamanian white-faced capuchin or Panamanian white-headed capuchin, Cebus imitator
- Marañón white-fronted capuchin, Cebus yuracus
- Shock-headed capuchin, Cebus cuscinus
- Spix's white-fronted capuchin, Cebus unicolor
- Humboldt's white-fronted capuchin, Cebus albifrons
- Guianan weeper capuchin, Cebus olivaceus
- Chestnut capuchin, Cebus castaneus
- Ka'apor capuchin, Cebus kaapori
- Trinidad white-fronted capuchin, Cebus trinitatis
- Venezuelan brown capuchin, Cebus brunneus
- Sierra de Perijá white-fronted capuchin, Cebus leucocephalus
- Río Cesar white-fronted capuchin, Cebus cesarae
- Varied white-fronted capuchin, Cebus versicolor
- Santa Marta white-fronted capuchin, Cebus malitiosus
- Ecuadorian white-fronted capuchin, Cebus aequatorialis

The placement of the Trinidad white-fronted capuchin is controversial; the American Society of Mammalogists classifies it as conspecific with C. brunneus based on a 2012 study later found to be flawed, while the IUCN Red List classifies it as a distinct species (Cebus triniatis) due to debate over the aforementioned study, and the ITIS classifies it as a subspecies of C. albifrons, also due to debate over the aforementioned study.

=== Taxonomic history ===
Philip Hershkovitz and William Charles Osman Hill published taxonomies of the capuchin monkeys in 1949 and 1960, respectively. These taxonomies established four species of capuchin monkey in the genus Cebus. One of those species, Cebus apella, is a robust capuchin and is now included in the genus Sapajus. The other three Cebus species included in that taxonomy were the gracile capuchin species Cebus albifrons, Cebus nigrivittatus and the type species Cebus capucinus. Cebus nigrivittatus was subsequently renamed Cebus olivaceus. Cebus kaapori had been considered a subspecies of C. olivaceus but Groves (2001 and 2005) and Silva (2001) regarded it as a separate species.

== Evolutionary history ==
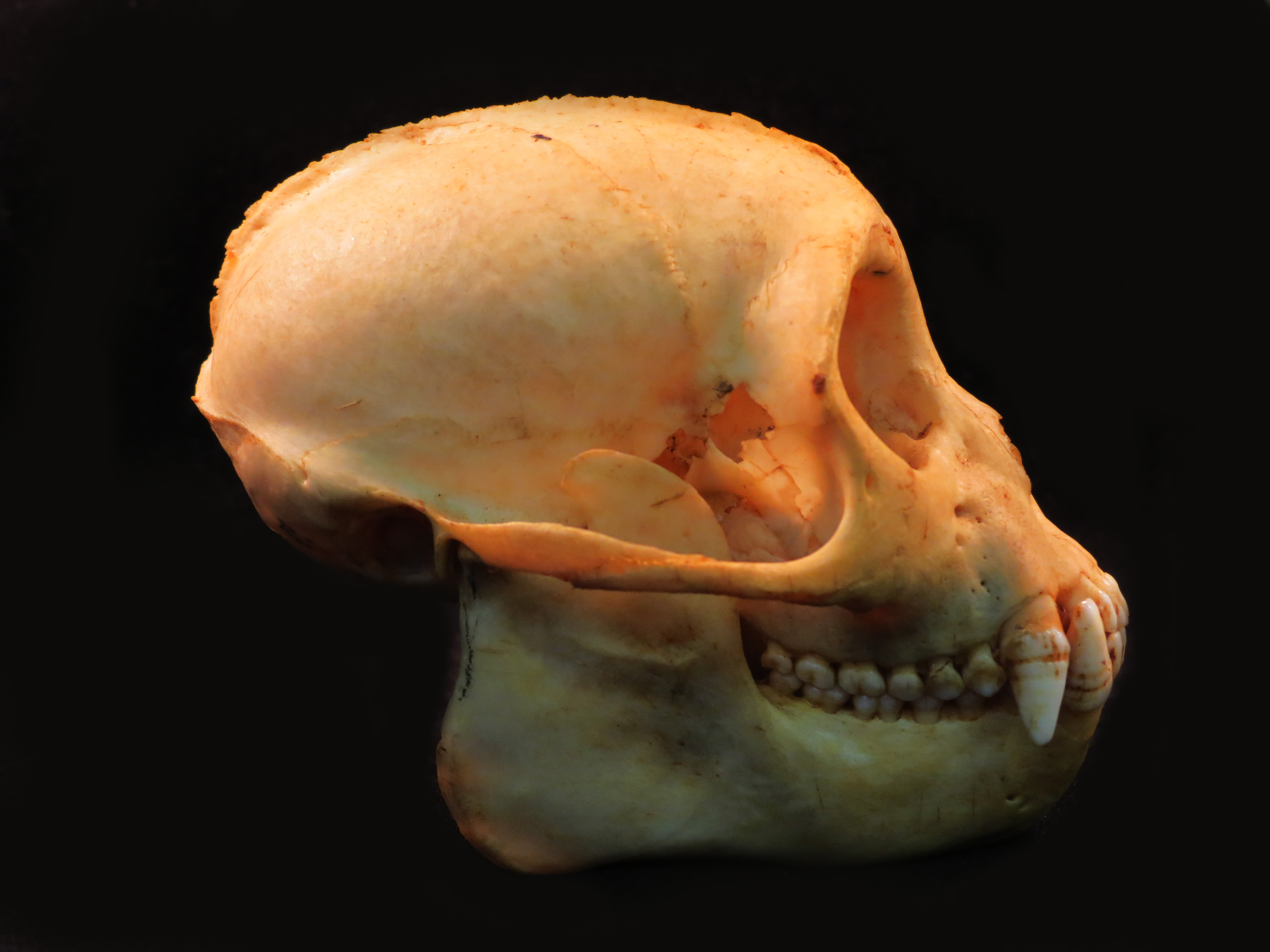

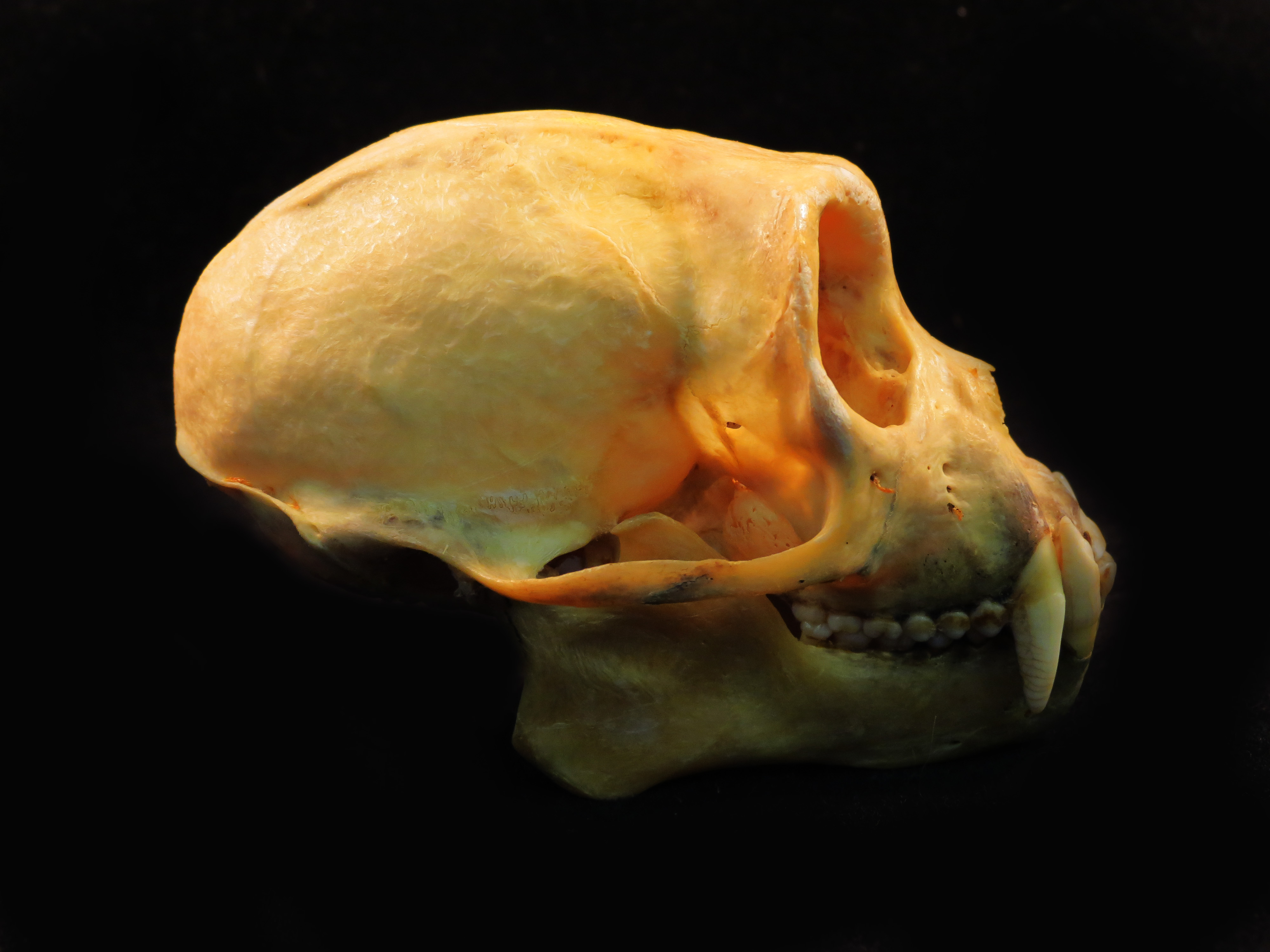
Top: Sapajus nigritus skull, a robust capuchin monkey. Bottom: Cebus olivaceus, a gracile capuchin monkey.

The gracile capuchins, like all capuchins, are members of the family Cebidae, which also includes the squirrel monkeys. The evolution of the squirrel monkeys and capuchin monkeys is believed to have diverged about 13 million years ago. According to genetic studies led by Lynch Alfaro in 2011, the gracile and robust capuchins diverged approximately 6.2 million years ago. Lynch Alfaro suspects that the divergence was triggered by the creation of the Amazon River, which separated the monkeys in the Amazon north of the Amazon River, which evolved into the gracile capuchins, from those in the Atlantic Forest south of the river, which evolved into the robust capuchins.

== Morphology ==
Gracile capuchins have longer limbs relative to their body size compared with robust capuchins. Gracile capuchins also have rounder skulls and other differences in skull morphology. Gracile capuchins lack certain adaptations for opening hard nuts which robust capuchins have. These include differences in the teeth and jaws, and the lack of a sagittal crest. Exterior differences include the fact that, although some females have tufts on their head (Humboldt's white-fronted capuchin and Guianan weeper capuchin), no male gracile capuchin has tufts, while all robust capuchins have tufts. Also, no gracile capuchins have beards.

== Distribution ==
Gracile capuchin monkeys have a wide range over Central America and north and north-west South America. The Panamanian white-headed capuchin is the most northern species, occurring in Central America from Honduras to Panama. The Colombian white-headed capuchin also has a northern distribution in Colombia and Ecuador west of the Andes. The white-fronted capuchin is found over large portions of Colombia, Peru and western Brazil, as well as into southern Venezuela and northern Bolivia. The weeper capuchin is found over much of Venezuela and over The Guianas, as well as part of northern Brazil. The Kaapori capuchin has a range that is disjoint from the other gracile capuchins, living in northern Brazil within the states of Pará and Maranhão. The only species to inhabit the Caribbean islands is the Trinidad white-fronted capuchin.

== Behaviour ==
=== Tool use ===
Some gracile capuchins are known to use tools. These include white-headed capuchins rubbing secretions from leaves over their bodies, using leaves as gloves when rubbing fruit or caterpillar secretions and using tools as a probe. White-fronted capuchins have been observed using leaves as a cup to drink water.

=== Mating systems ===
==== Male weaponry ====
Intrasexual selection, or male-male competition, occurs when males invoke contests in order to gain the opportunity to reproduce with a female and maximize their reproductive success. Often males are adorned with weaponry, which can be used in order to increase their chances of winning contests for possible mates. In the genus Cebus, there is a large amount of dimorphism in canine size between males and females. Canines are hypothesized to be larger in males because canine dimorphism is generally correlated to male-male competition. In the wedge-capped capuchin there is a larger amount of canine dimorphism compared to the white-faced capuchin and the white-fronted capuchin. The difference in canine dimorphism between these species can be correlated to the differences in social structure of these three groups. The alpha male of the wedge-capped capuchin tends to monopolize mating, therefore engaging in more male-male competition, while in the white-faced capuchin and in the white-fronted capuchin the alpha male does not monopolize mating and allows subordinate males to mate with females. While not much is known about the Kaapori capuchin, due to its low population size, it is likely it would possess more canine dimorphism, like the wedge-capped capuchin, because of its similar social structure with a monopolizing alpha male and peripheral subordinate males.

==== Direct and indirect female benefits ====
If a female is presented an opportunity to copulate with a male she will evaluate both the costs and benefits of that male. Females can obtain direct benefits from males she mates with, where the female gains an instant benefit from the male to herself. Direct benefits that would apply to females of the genus Cebus would include; vigilance from males, protection from predators and conspecifics, and increased resources. Females can also benefit indirectly from males, in the form of phenotypic and genotypic benefits to her offspring as well as male protection of those offspring. Alpha males are more fit, and therefore more likely, to provide direct and indirect benefits to the female compared to other subordinate males. In the white-faced capuchin the alpha male fathers 70-90% of the offspring produced by females in his group. It is hypothesized that females are mating with alpha males while they are ovulating and then mating with subordinate males after they are no longer conceptive. Some female primates, like in the white-fronted capuchin, will mate with subordinate males while they are no longer conceptive in order to decrease the amount of resource competition and increase the amount of male protection for her offspring.

=== Parental care ===
Capuchin infants are born in an altricial state, which means they need a lot of parental care in order to survive. The majority of parental care in the genus Cebus is provided by the mother, but in the case of the wedge-capped capuchin, parental care is also provided by other conspecific females; this type of care is referred to as allomaternal care. In the wedge-capped capuchin, the mother will provide the infant care for the first three months, however for the next three months the infant relies on the care of other females. In agreement with kin selection theory, kin of the mother are more likely to provide care to the infant compared to other females in the group; siblings were four times as likely to provide infant care compared to other group females. Male parental care is rare in the genus Cebus, only in the white-headed capuchin is there some interaction between males and offspring. In white-headed capuchins males will often investigate, or at least tolerate, their offspring. Alpha males are also more likely to interact with their offspring than subordinate males.

== Conservation status ==
All gracile capuchin species except the Kaapori capuchin are rated as least concern by the International Union for Conservation of Nature. The Kaapori capuchin is rated as critically endangered.
