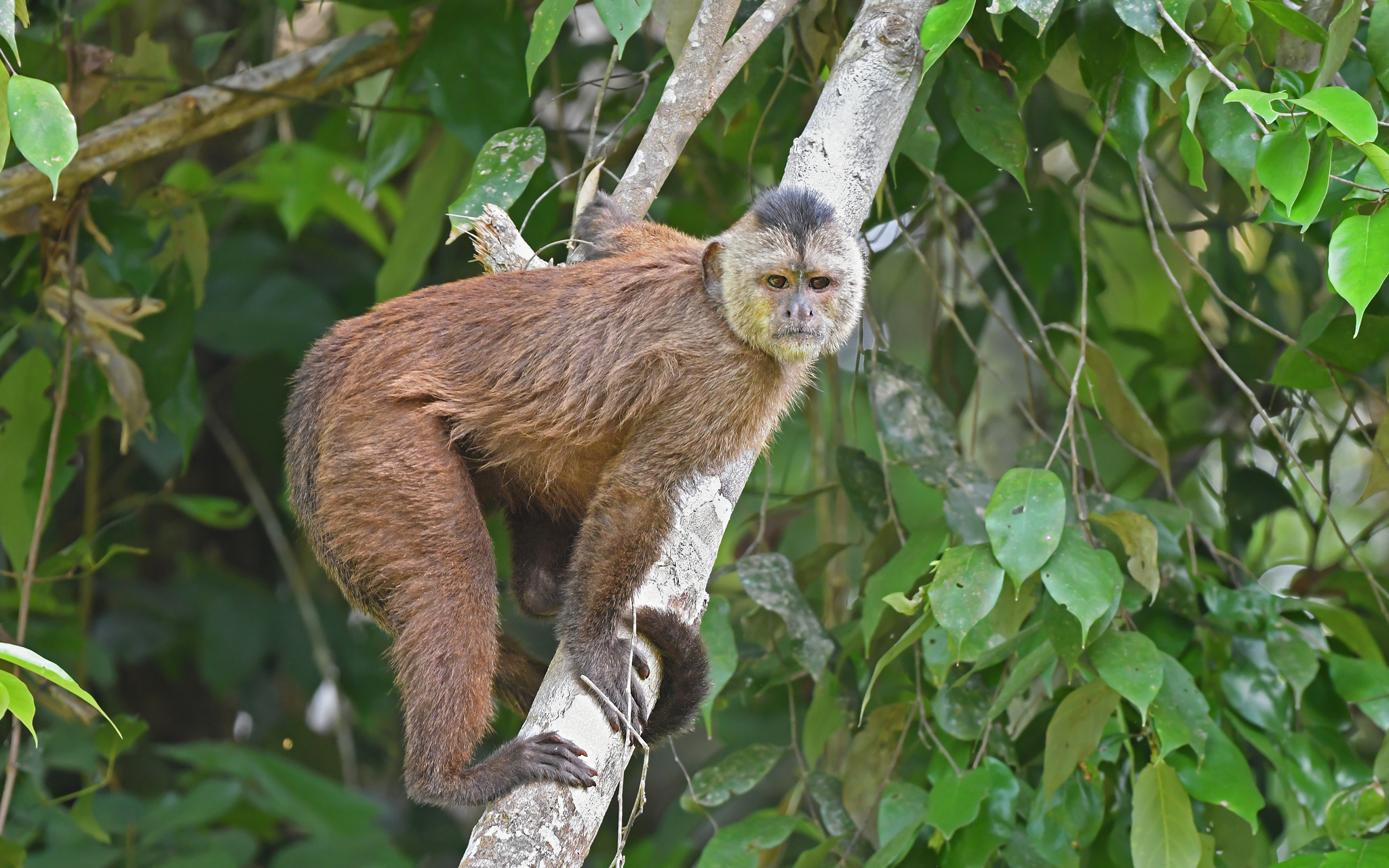

Conservation status
- Critically Endangered (IUCN 3.1)

Scientific classification
- Kingdom: Animalia
- Phylum: Chordata
- Class: Mammalia
- Infraclass: Placentalia
- Order: Primates
- Family: Cebidae
- Genus: Cebus
- Species: C. kaapori

Binomial name
- Cebus kaapori Queiroz, 1992
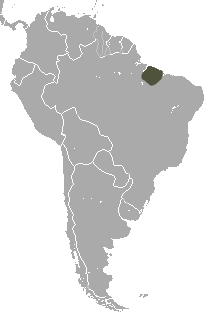
- Geographic range in eastern Brazil

= Kaapori capuchin =

Species of New World monkey

The Kaapori capuchin (Cebus kaapori), also known as the Ka'apor capuchin, is a species of frugivorous, gracile capuchin endemic to the Brazilian Amazon. Their geographical home range is relatively small and is within the most densely populated region of the Amazon. With the strong human presence nearby,C. kaapori has had to deal with very large amounts of disturbances to their habitat and is one of the most endangered of the neotropical primates.

== Taxonomy ==
First described by Helder Queiroz in 1992, C. kaapori was considered a subspecies for a long time. At the time of his discovery, Queiroz noted its similarities with the members of the C. olivaceus species. After analyzing their genetic makeup, researchers Harada and Ferrari argued that the Ka'apor capuchins should be considered a subspecies of the latter. However, due to various morphological and molecular evidence, the species is currently deemed a valid species in its own right.

== Physical characteristics ==
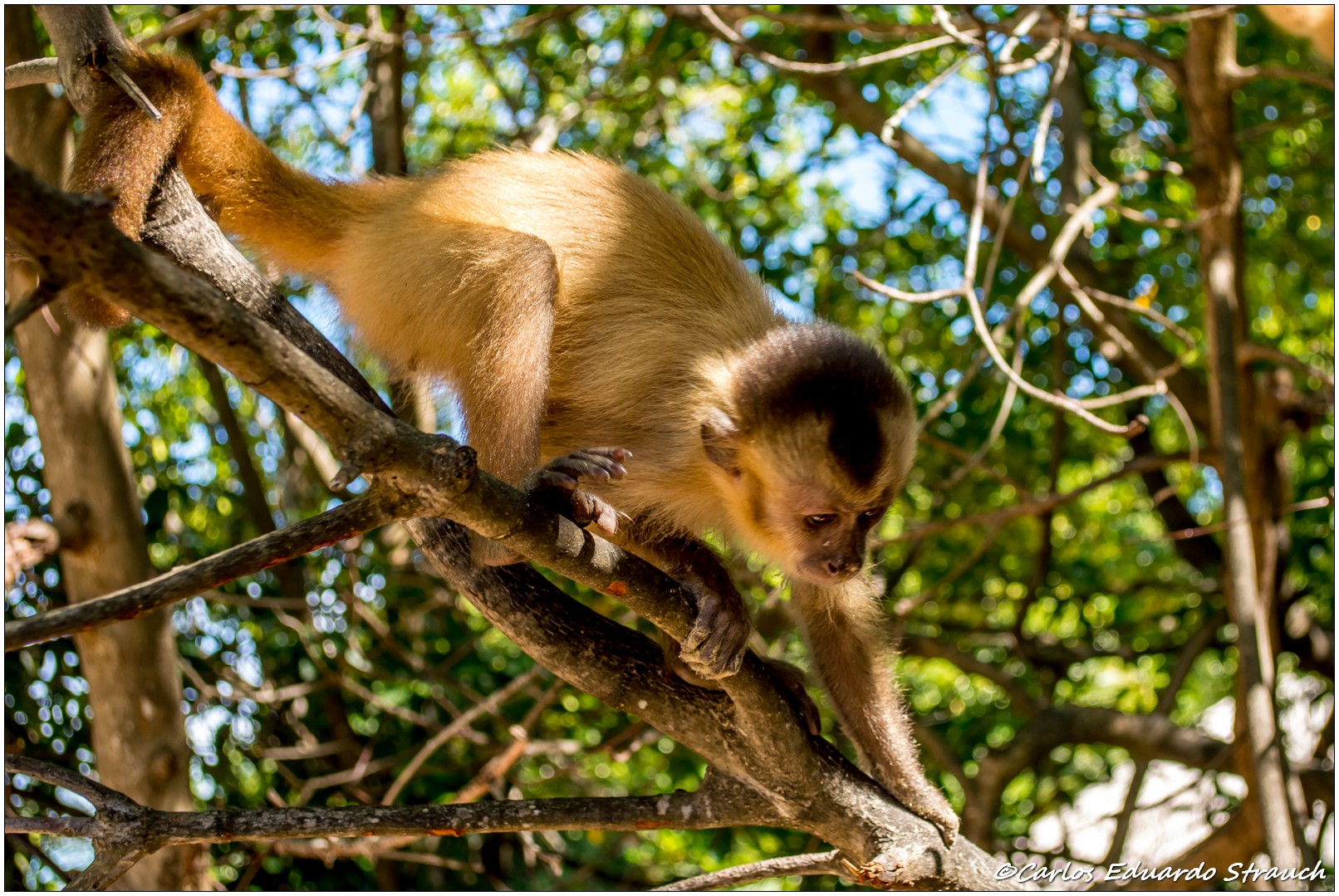
Kaapori capuchin in Maranhão

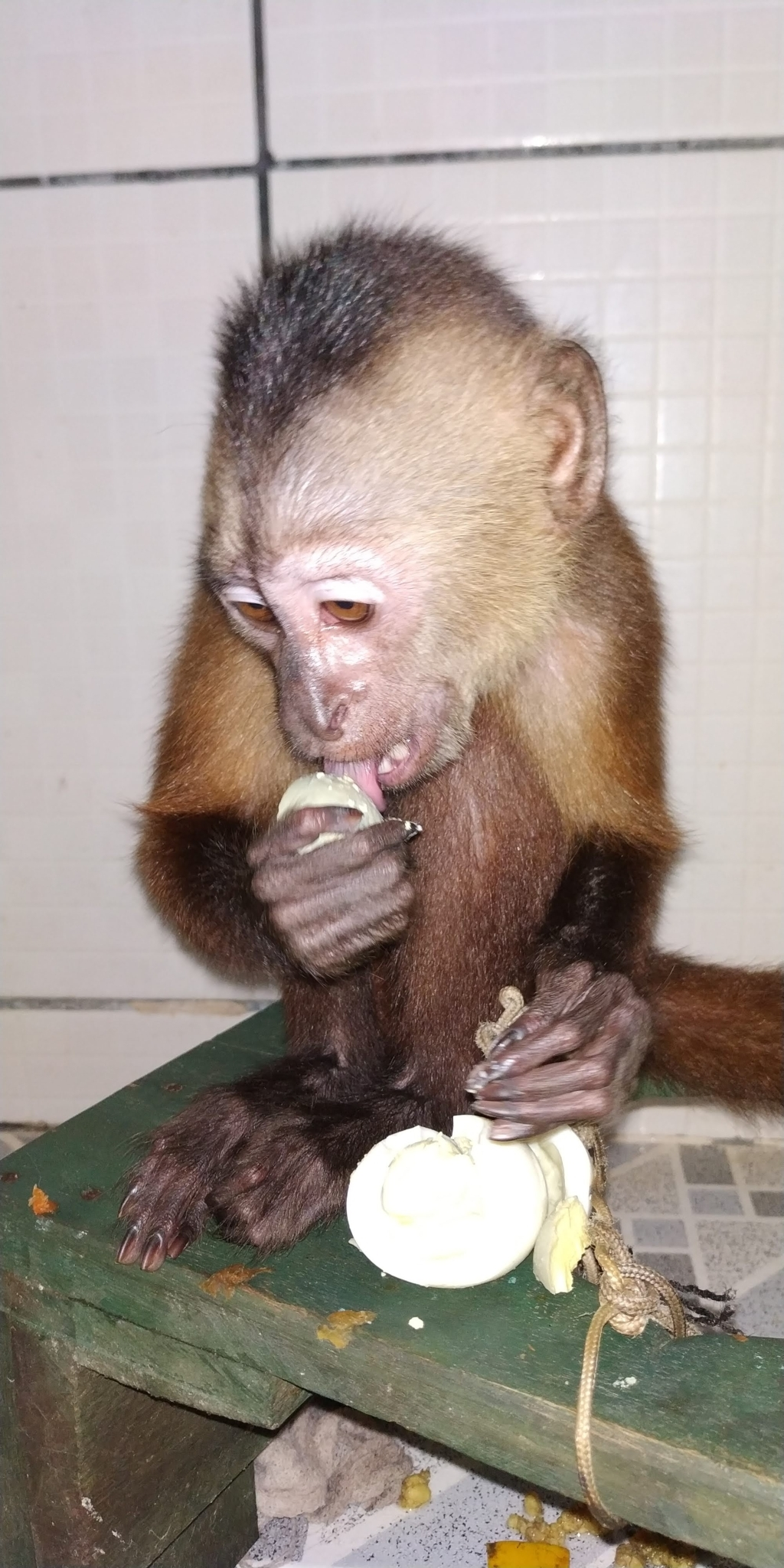
Kaapori capuchin in captivity

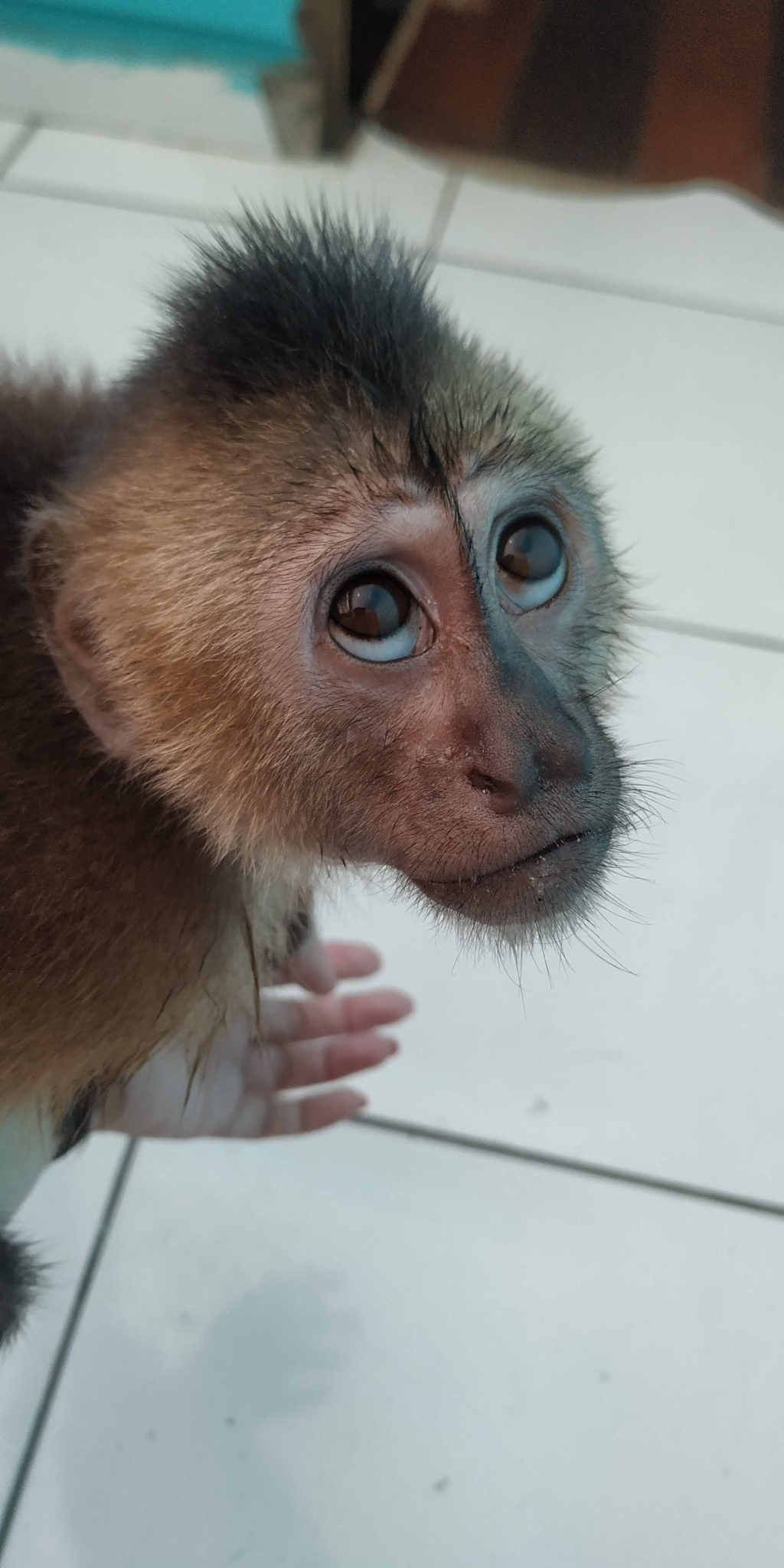
Captive Kaapori Capuchin

Part of the genus of gracile capuchin monkeys, the ka'apor capuchin tend to have longer limbs in comparison to their body size as opposed to members of the Sapajus genus. On average, the adult male Ka'apor capuchin weighs approximately 3 kg (6.6 lb). They also have rounder skulls as well as differences in their teeth and jaws which renders them incapable of opening hard nuts like their robust counterparts. Another notable trait is that no male gracile capuchin have tufts on their head, whereas all Sapajus do.

== Habitat and distribution ==
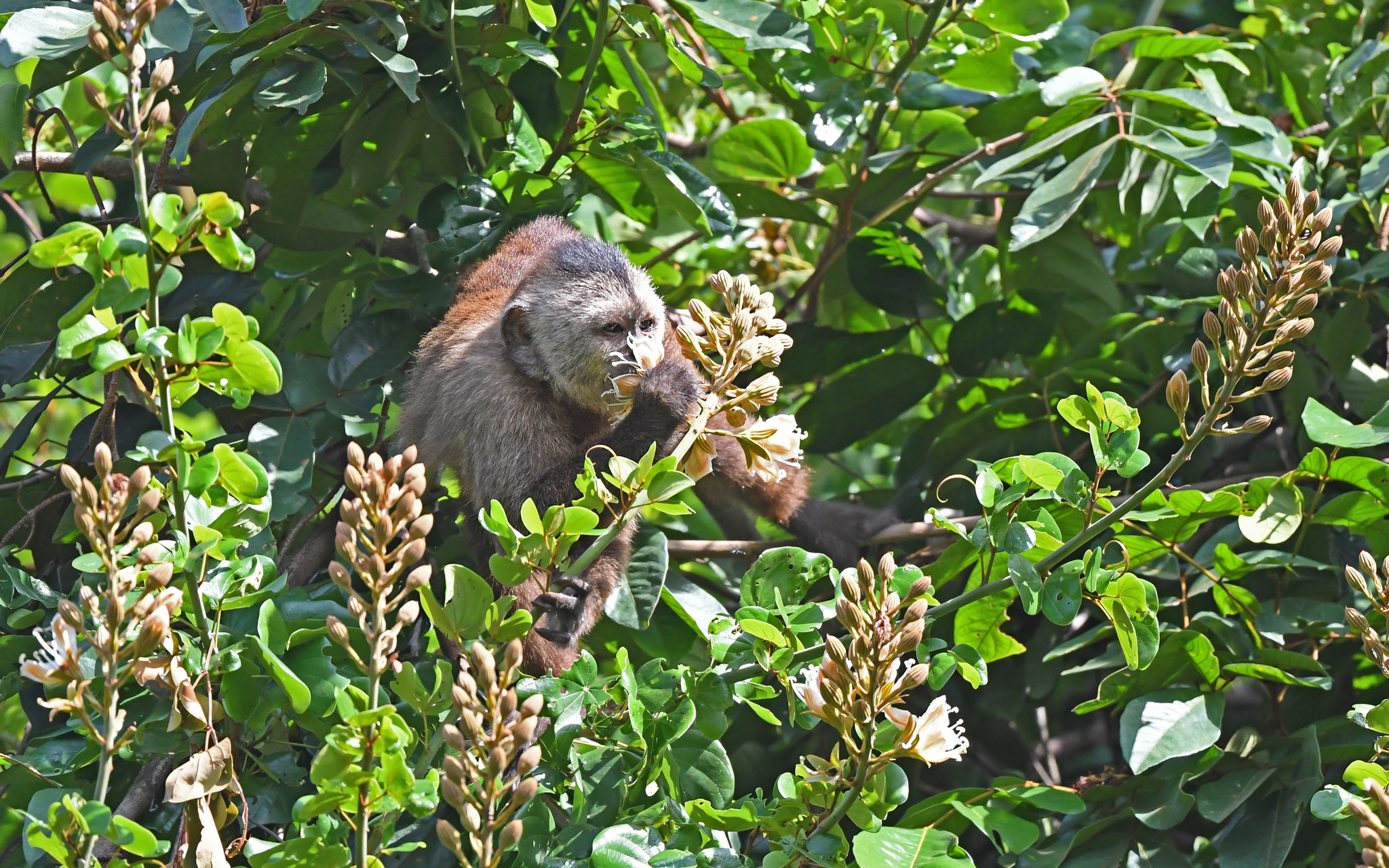
Ka'apor Capuchin In The Wild At Brazil

The Ka'apor capuchin has been described as having one of the smallest geographical ranges of any other Cebus species in the Amazon. They can be found in the eastern border of the Brazilian Amazon along the Atlantic coast; more specifically in the states of Pará and Maranhão. The region is known as for having the highest population density in all of the Amazon. Due to the large human population living in the same area, the species tend to live in isolated patches of tall, lowland terra firme forest. Included in their range, are two protected stretches of land: the Gurupi Biological Reserve and the Lago de Turucuí Environmental Protection Area. Studies of the Ka'apor capuchin populations in these areas have had very varying results but the consensus seems to be that the species is quite rare, even within their known range. In one study, researchers following a group of C. kaapori observed that their average daily travel was of approximately 2,175 m and utilized most quadrants of their home range every month.

== Behavior ==
=== Diet ===
Like most capuchins, the Kaapori capuchin is diurnal, arboreal and omnivorous. While they are omnivores, C. kaapori seem to rely heavily on fruit for nutrition. One study of the species in the wild concluded that almost 75% of their diet was composed of fruit matter such as fruit pulp or the aril of immature fruit. Other sources of nutrition which came up often in the study were arthropods (12.6%) and seeds (10.2%). From their research, the scientists concluded that the Ka'apor capuchins' diet resembles most closely that of the Sapajus genera than their fellow Cebus species. When foraging for insects, the capuchins can be observed practicing various techniques such as extracting their prey from leaves by breaking them manually, breaking branches with their teeth and hands in order to reach the ants inside and smashing snails against trees in order to crack their shells open.

=== Social structures and mating ===
The species is generally found living in small groups of less than 10 individuals, sometimes even alongside bearded sakis or robust capuchins. While there is very little known about the species' mating practices, one thing known is that the birth season is from June to July. The Kaapori capuchin is polygamous, and females usually give birth to one infant per birth, with twins being rare. Births usually occur every 2 years, but they may occur closer together if a baby dies, with a gestation period of 150 – 180 days.

== Threats ==
The species is among the most threatened primates in the Amazon. As of 2017, the population of C. kaapori has decreased by over 80% and is categorized as Critically Endangered by the IUCN Red List. There are many reasons as to why the species is so at risk. Some researchers believe that the species is naturally rare, and that they seem to be very sensitive to even a slight disturbance in their habitat. This being said, their habitat has been more than slightly disturbed; with the strong human presence nearby comes great deforestation and environmental disturbances. Over 70% of the area's forest has been removed; one of the main reasons being for agricultural purposes such as soy plantations and pasture. In 1978, the largest hydroelectric dam in all of Brazil, was built inside the species' home range. This project had devastating repercussions on their habitat; flooding over 2,000 km^{2} and creating thousands of islands of between 1 and 1,000 hectares in size where land once was. As one could expect, this caused heavy degradation to the surrounding forest, leaving the remaining forest fragmented. As for many other species in the Amazon, the Ka'apor capuchin has also been a victim of hunting and poaching. One major concern for conservation of the species is the fact that so little standardized research has been done on the topic thus, in order to be able to protect them adequately we need to understand them more thoroughly.
