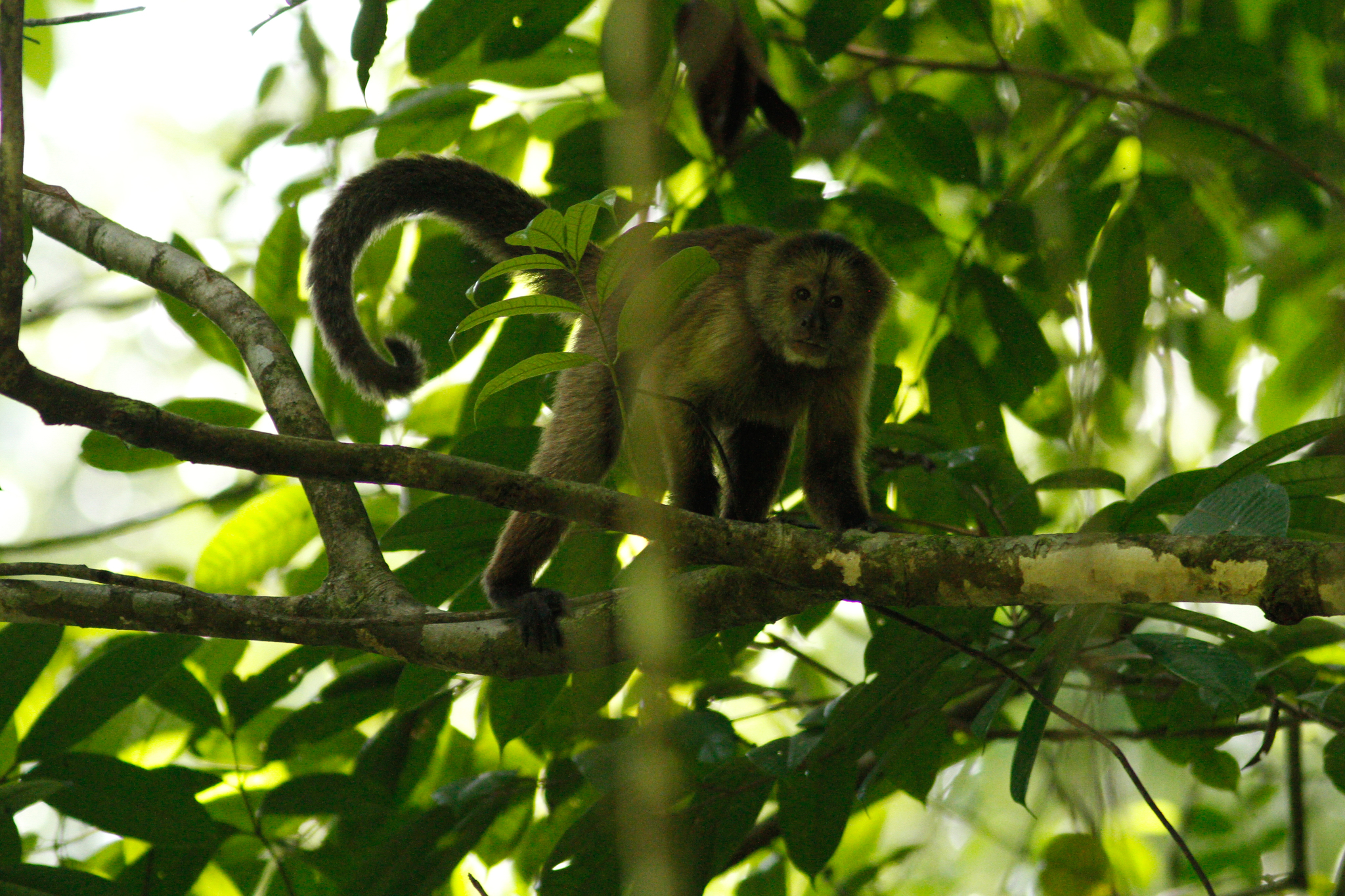
- In French Guiana

Conservation status
- Least Concern (IUCN 3.1)

Scientific classification
- Kingdom: Animalia
- Phylum: Chordata
- Class: Mammalia
- Infraclass: Placentalia
- Order: Primates
- Family: Cebidae
- Genus: Cebus
- Species: C. castaneus

Binomial name
- Cebus castaneus I. Geoffroy, 1851

= Chestnut capuchin =

Species of capuchin monkey

The chestnut capuchin or chestnut weeper capuchin (Cebus castaneus) is a species of capuchin monkey from northeastern Brazil, southern Guyana, Suriname, and French Guiana.

== Taxonomy ==
It was described in 1851 as a subspecies of the wedge-capped capuchin (C. olivaceus). However, a 2012 study found grounds to at least tentatively recognize it as a distinct species. The American Society of Mammalogists, IUCN Red List, and ITIS all follow this classification.

== Distribution ==
It is found in northeastern Brazil, southern Guyana, and most of Suriname and French Guiana. It inhabits the uplands of the Guiana Shield north of the Amazon River, east of the Rio Negro, limited on both sides by the Branco River, and from here ranges north, east of the Orinoco and Ventuari rivers, to Guyana. Its range still remains poorly known.
