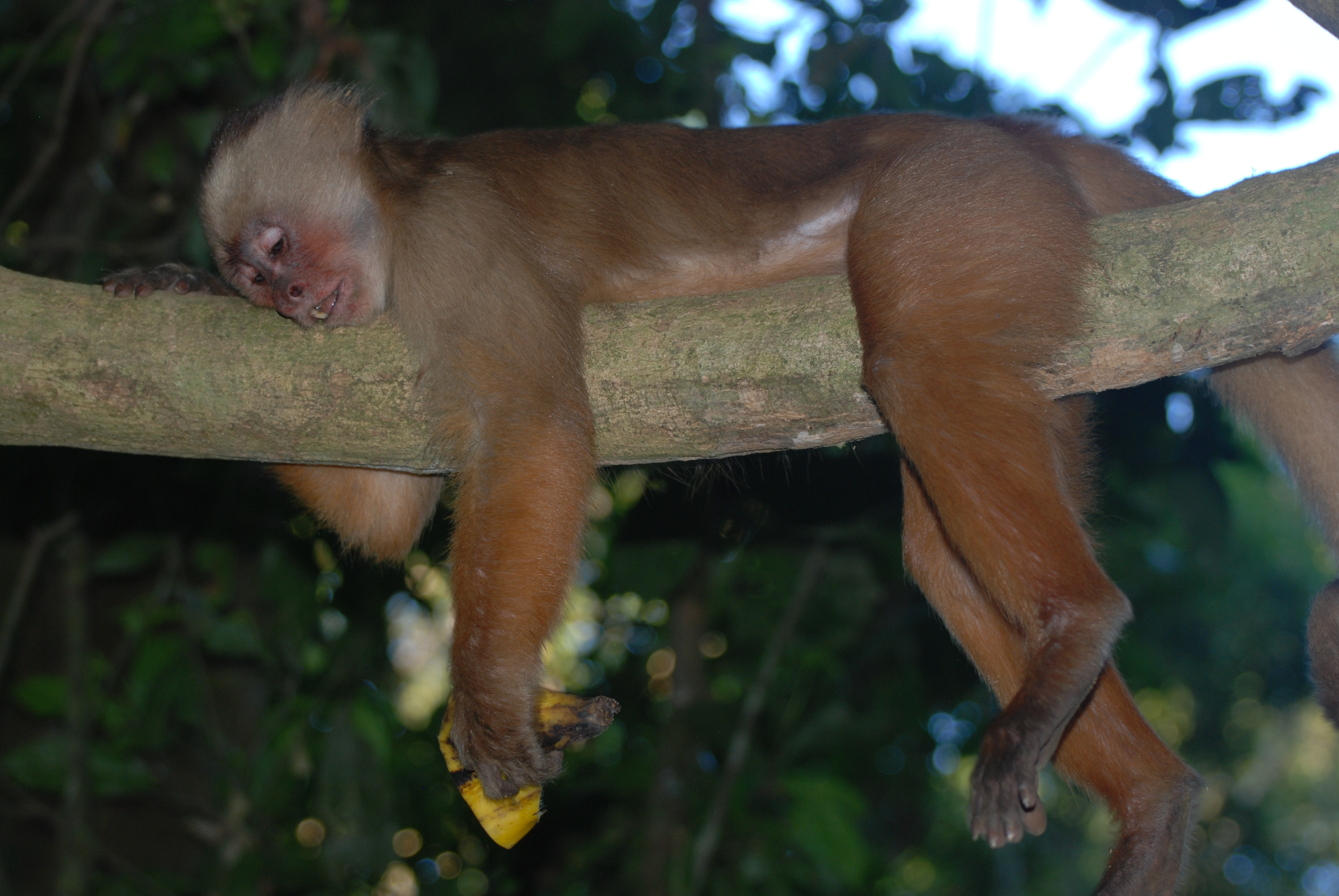

Conservation status
- Near Threatened (IUCN 3.1)

Scientific classification
- Kingdom: Animalia
- Phylum: Chordata
- Class: Mammalia
- Infraclass: Placentalia
- Order: Primates
- Family: Cebidae
- Genus: Cebus
- Species: C. cuscinus

Binomial name
- Cebus cuscinus (Thomas, 1901)

= Shock-headed capuchin =

Species of New World monkey

The shock-headed capuchin (Cebus cuscinus) is a species of gracile capuchin monkey from Bolivia and Peru. It was previously classified as a subspecies of the Humboldt's white-fronted capuchin (C. albifrons), but in 2013 Mittermeier and Rylands elevated it to a separate species, following genetic studies by Boubli et al. in 2012 and Lynch Alfaro et al. in 2010.

The shock-headed capuchin lives in lowland and seasonally inundated forests of the upper Amazon Basin, as well as montane forests of the western Andes Mountains up to elevations of 1,800 m (5,900 ft). Males have a head and body length of about 40 cm (16 in) with a tail length of about 44 cm (17 in). Females have a head and body length between 39 and 46 cm (15 and 18 in) with a tail length between 39 and 47.5 cm (15.4 and 18.7 in).
