= White-faced capuchin =

Common name for several monkey species

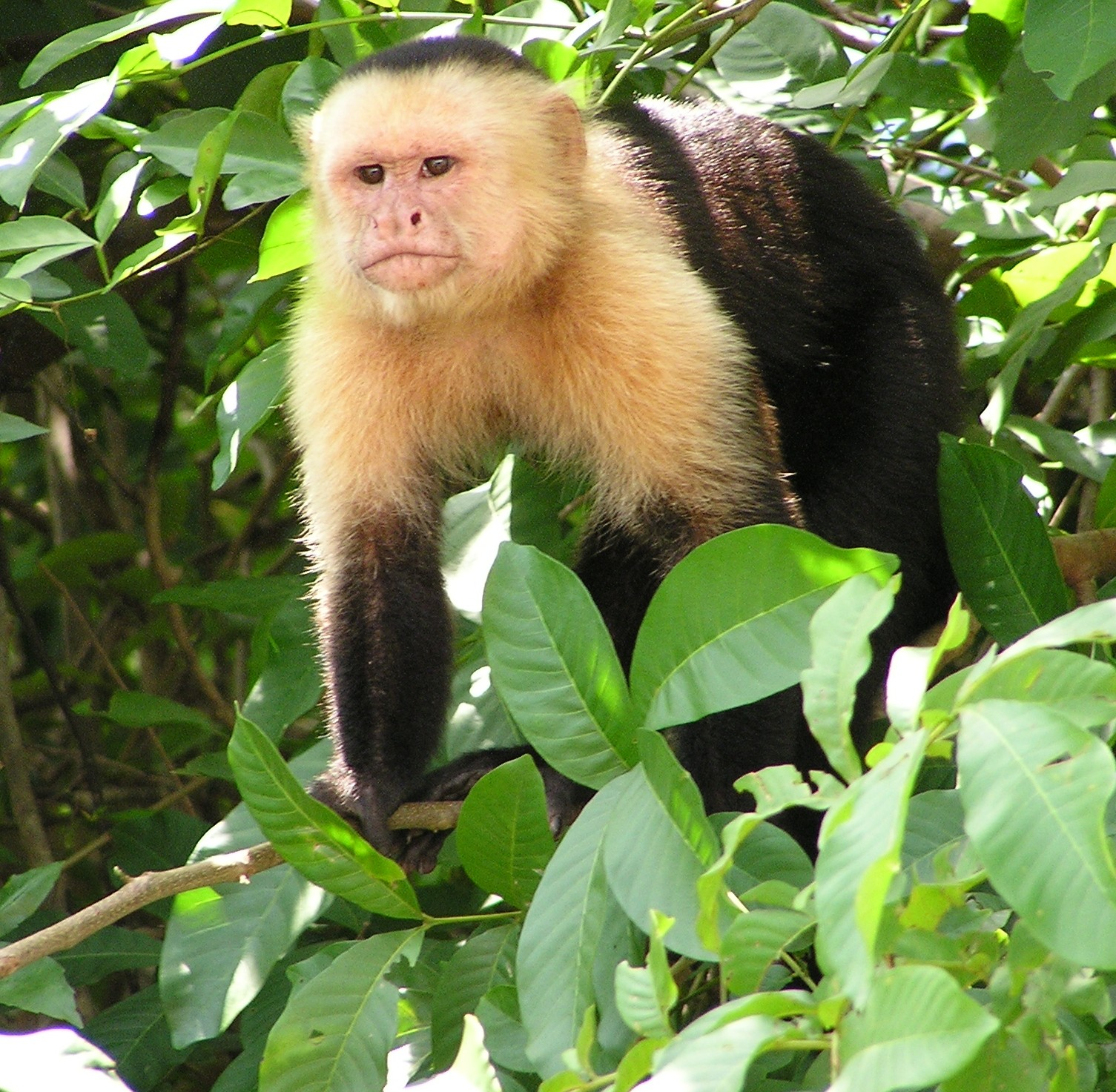

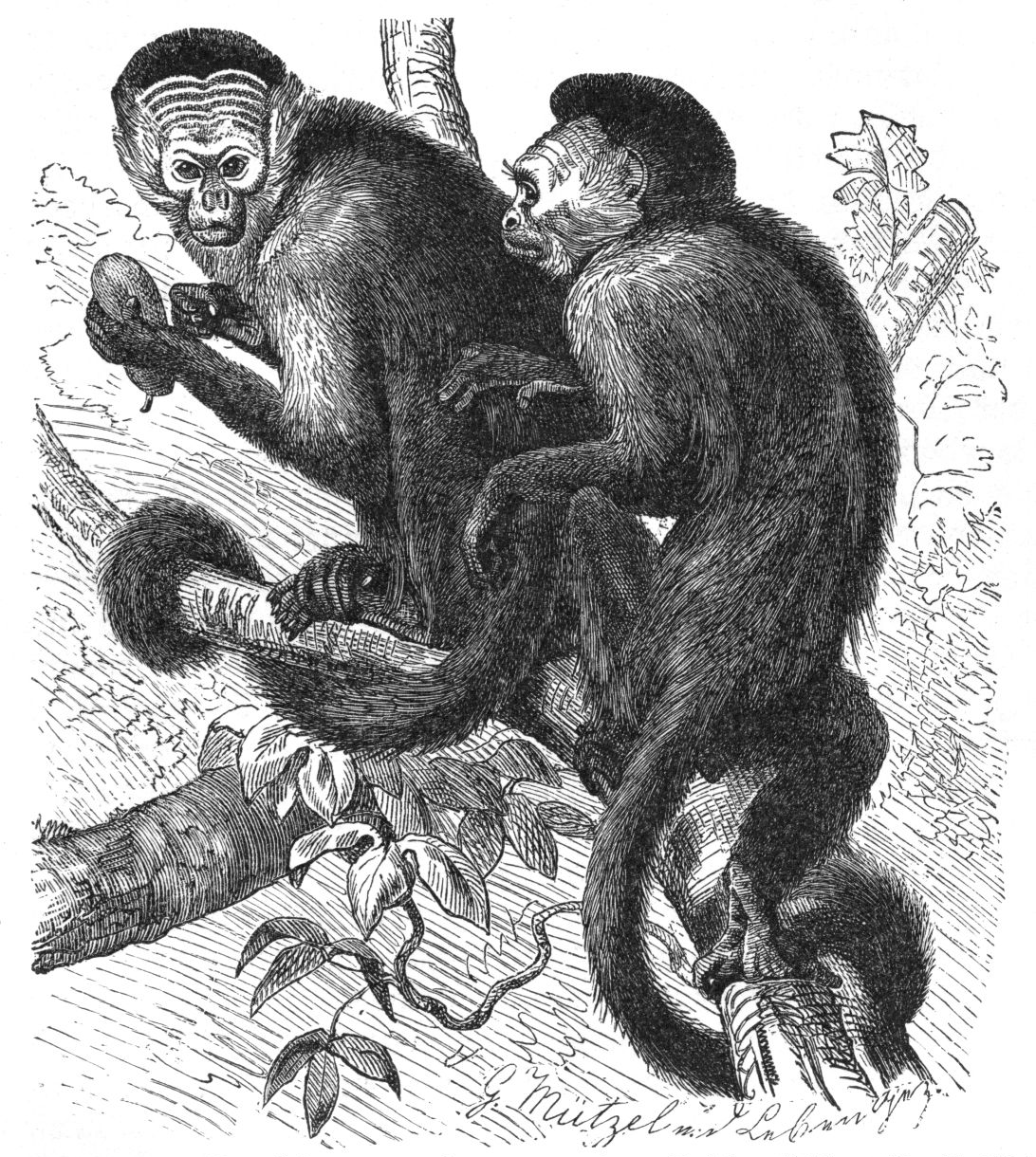
Kapuzineraffe, Cebus capucinus Erxl. 1/6 natürlicher Größe. (zu S. 659.)" Translation (partly): "White-faced capuchin, Cebus capucinus Erxl. 1/6 natural size. (zu page 659.)" Size: 3.6 x 4.1 in^{2} (9.2 x 10.3 cm^{2}) Originator: Gustav Mützel (1839–1893). Source: Brehms Tierleben, Small Edition 1927.

White-faced capuchin, or white headed capuchin, can refer to either of two species of gracile capuchin monkey:

- Cebus imitator, the Panamanian white-faced capuchin, also known as the Panamanian white-headed capuchin or Central American white-faced capuchin
- Cebus capucinus, the Colombian white-faced capuchin, also known as the Colombian white-headed capuchin

There are 2 subspecies of Colombian white-headed capuchin:

- C. c. capucinus
- C. c. curtus (Gorgona white-headed capuchin)

C. imitator has a range in Central America, in Honduras, Nicaragua, Costa Rica and Panama. The range of C. capucinus is primarily in South America, in western Colombia and northwest Ecuador, although its range extends into the easternmost portion of Panama. C. c. curtus has a range restricted to Gorgona Island, while C. c. capucinus covers the remainder of the C. capucinus range.

The two species differ slightly in appearance. Both are smallish monkeys which have black bodies, tails and limbs, with white faces, throats, chests and shoulders. But females of C. imitator have brownish or grayish elongated frontal tufts which are lacking in C. capucinus.

C. imitator had been regarded as a subspecies of C. capucinus until genetic studies in the 2010s revealed that the two species separated as much as 2 million years ago. Although the Colombian white-headed capuchin retained the scientific name C. capucinus from prior to the species being split, almost all previous research on white-faced capuchins under the name C. capucinus had actually been on the Central American species C. imitator as there have not been any field studies on the South American species.
