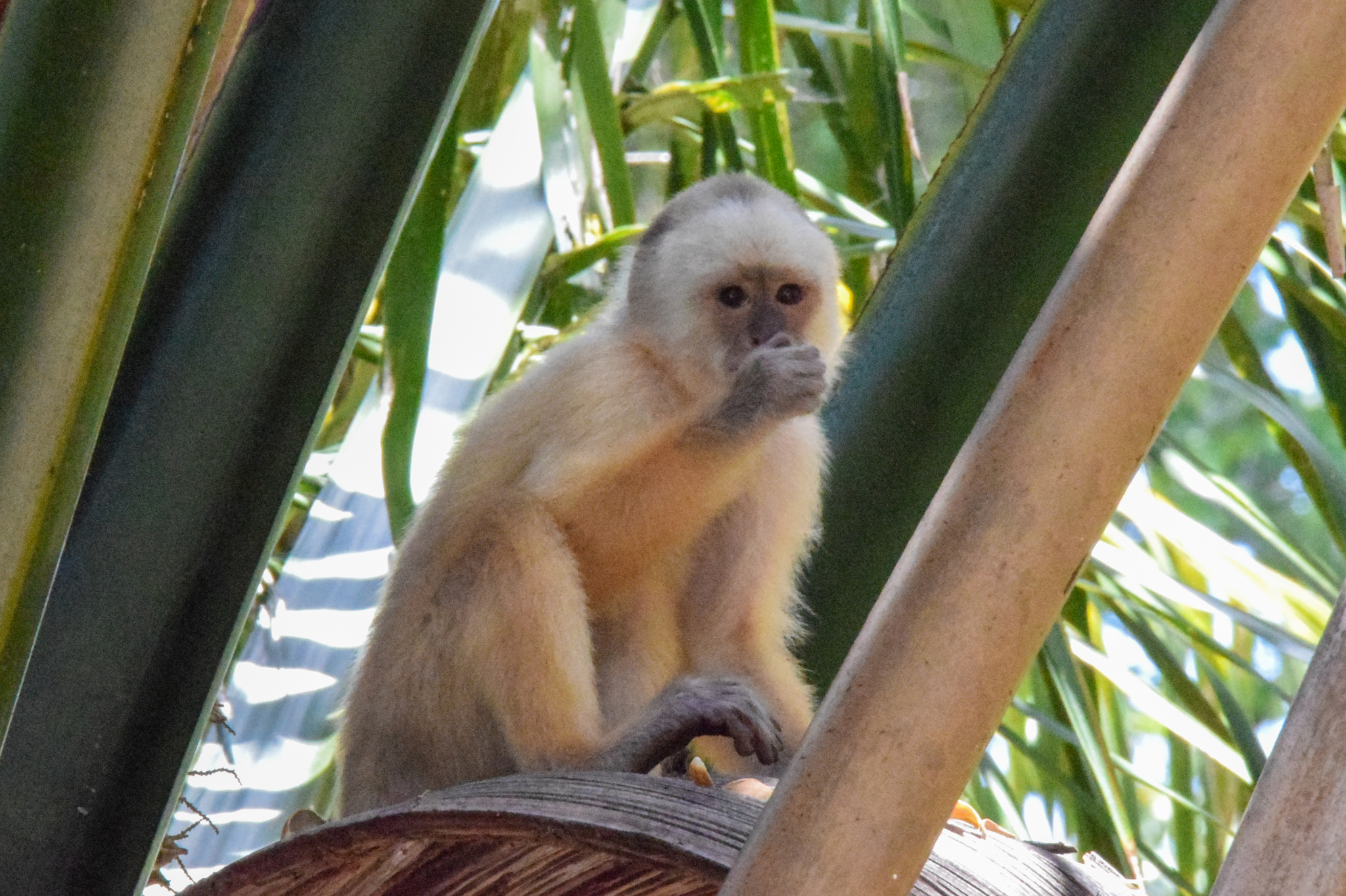

Conservation status
- Critically Endangered (IUCN 3.1)

Scientific classification
- Kingdom: Animalia
- Phylum: Chordata
- Class: Mammalia
- Order: Primates
- Family: Cebidae
- Genus: Cebus
- Species: C. albifrons
- Subspecies: C. a. trinitatis

Trinomial name
- Cebus albifrons trinitatis (Pusch, 1942)

= Trinidad white-fronted capuchin =

Subspecies of New World monkey

The Trinidad white-fronted capuchin is a subspecies (Cebus albifrons trinitatis) or species (Cebus trinitatis) of gracile capuchin monkey. It is found on the island of Trinidad.

== Taxonomy ==
Boubli et al. found in a 2012 study that the capuchins on Trinidad had derived from within C. olivaceus brunneus (or more specifically, the mitochondrial genes of the single Trinidad specimen they sampled derived from brunneus). However, the morphological distinctiveness of Trinidad populations has led to doubts over its taxonomic position. Further complicating this taxonomy is the fact that subsequent morphological inspection of the C. brunneus specimens used for the study found them to be distinct from the actual type specimen of C. brunneus. Due to this controversy, taxonomic authorities take differing views on the Trinidad capuchins; the IUCN Red List classifies them as a distinct, critically endangered species (C. trinitatis), the American Society of Mammalogists recognizes them as conspecific with C. brunneus, and the ITIS considers them a subspecies of the Humboldt's white-fronted capuchin (C. a. trinitatis). Furthermore, the ITIS listing for C. a. trinitatis notes:

Anthony Rylands (email dated 8 March, 2021) indicates that Cebus albifrons trinitatis Pusch, 1942 should no longer be considered a junior synonym of C. brunneus Allen, 1914, due to reconsideration of the specimens used in Boubli et al. (2012). New work on the genus is pending which will address this.

== Habitat and distribution ==
The Trinidad white-fronted capuchin is found on the island of Trinidad. It prefers primary forest but is also found in various types of secondary forest. It tends to prefer moister and less disturbed forest than other capuchin species.

The Trinidad white-fronted capuchin is classified as critically endangered by the International Union for Conservation of Nature, having a population of only 50 mature individuals.
