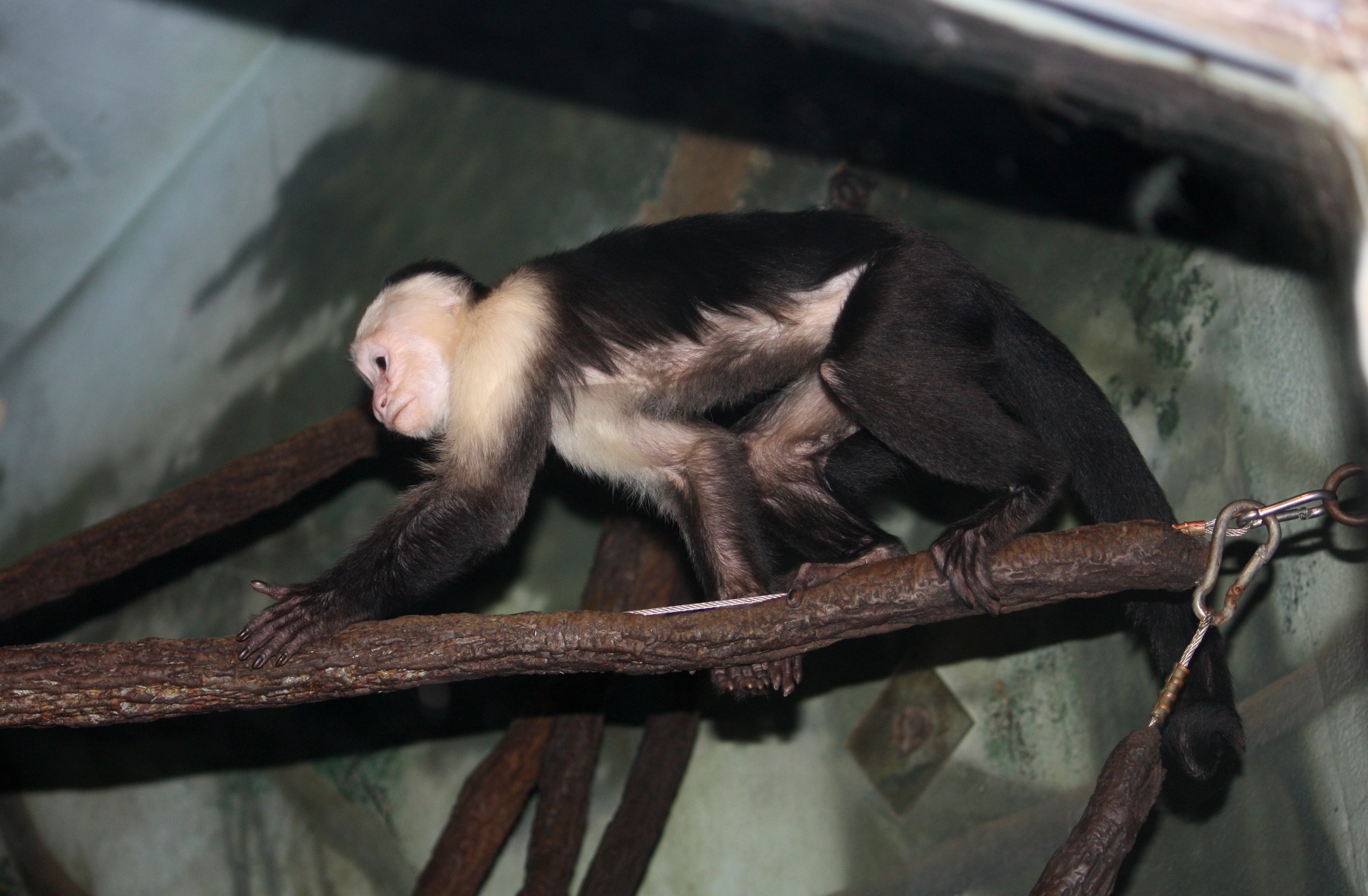

Conservation status
- Vulnerable (IUCN 3.1)

Scientific classification
- Kingdom: Animalia
- Phylum: Chordata
- Class: Mammalia
- Infraclass: Placentalia
- Order: Primates
- Family: Cebidae
- Genus: Cebus
- Species: C. capucinus

Binomial name
- Cebus capucinus (Linnaeus, 1758)
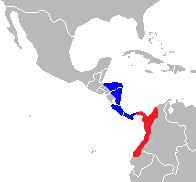
- Distributions of Cebus capucinus (red) and Cebus imitator (blue). C. capucinus is found in eastern Panama as well as South America.

= Colombian white-faced capuchin =

Species of New World monkey

The Colombian white-faced capuchin (Cebus capucinus), also known as the Colombian white-headed capuchin or Colombian white-throated capuchin, is a medium-sized New World monkey of the family Cebidae, subfamily Cebinae. It is native to the extreme eastern portion of Panama and the extreme north-western portion of South America in western Colombia and northwestern Ecuador.

The Colombian white-faced capuchin was one of the many species originally described by Carl Linnaeus in his landmark 1758 10th edition of Systema Naturae. It is a member of the family Cebidae, the family of New World monkeys containing capuchin monkeys and squirrel monkeys. It is the type species for the genus Cebus, the genus that includes all the capuchin monkeys.

The white-faced capuchin is, with tufted capuchins, the most well-studied capuchin species.

== Taxonomy ==
Until the 21st century, the Panamanian white-faced capuchin, Cebus imitator, was considered conspecific with the Colombian white-faced capuchin, as the subspecies C. capucinus imitator. Some primatologists continue to consider the Panamanian and Colombian white-faced capuchins as a single species. In 2012 a study by Boubli, et al demonstrated that C. imitator and C. capucinus split up to 2 million years ago.

Two subspecies of Colombian white-faced capuchin are recognized:

- C. c. capucinus, from mainland South America and Panama
- C. c. curtus, from the Pacific island of Gorgona, sometimes referred to as the Gorgona white-faced capuchin.

== Description ==
Like other monkeys in the genus Cebus, the Colombian white-faced capuchin is named after the order of Capuchin friars because the cowls of these friars closely resemble the monkey's head coloration. The coloration is black on the body, tail, legs and the top of the head, with white chest, throat, face, shoulders and upper arms. The head and body length is between 33 and 45 cm (13 and 18 in) with a tail length of between 35 and 55 cm (14 and 22 in). Males weigh between 3 and 4 kg (6.6 and 8.8 lb), while females are about 27% smaller, weighing between 1.5 and 3 kg (3.3 and 6.6 lb). C. c. curtus has a shorter tail.

== Distribution ==
The white-faced capuchin is found in the extreme north-western strip between the Pacific Ocean and the Andes Mountains in Colombia and northwestern Ecuador.

== Conservation ==
C. c. capucinus has been listed as vulnerable from a conservation standpoint by the IUCN, while C. c. curtus has been listed as vulnerable.

== Predation ==
Predators of Colombian white-faced capuchins include boa constrictors, tree boas (Corallus), lanceheads (such as Bothrops asper), caimans (Caiman), jaguars, ocelots and harpy eagles.
