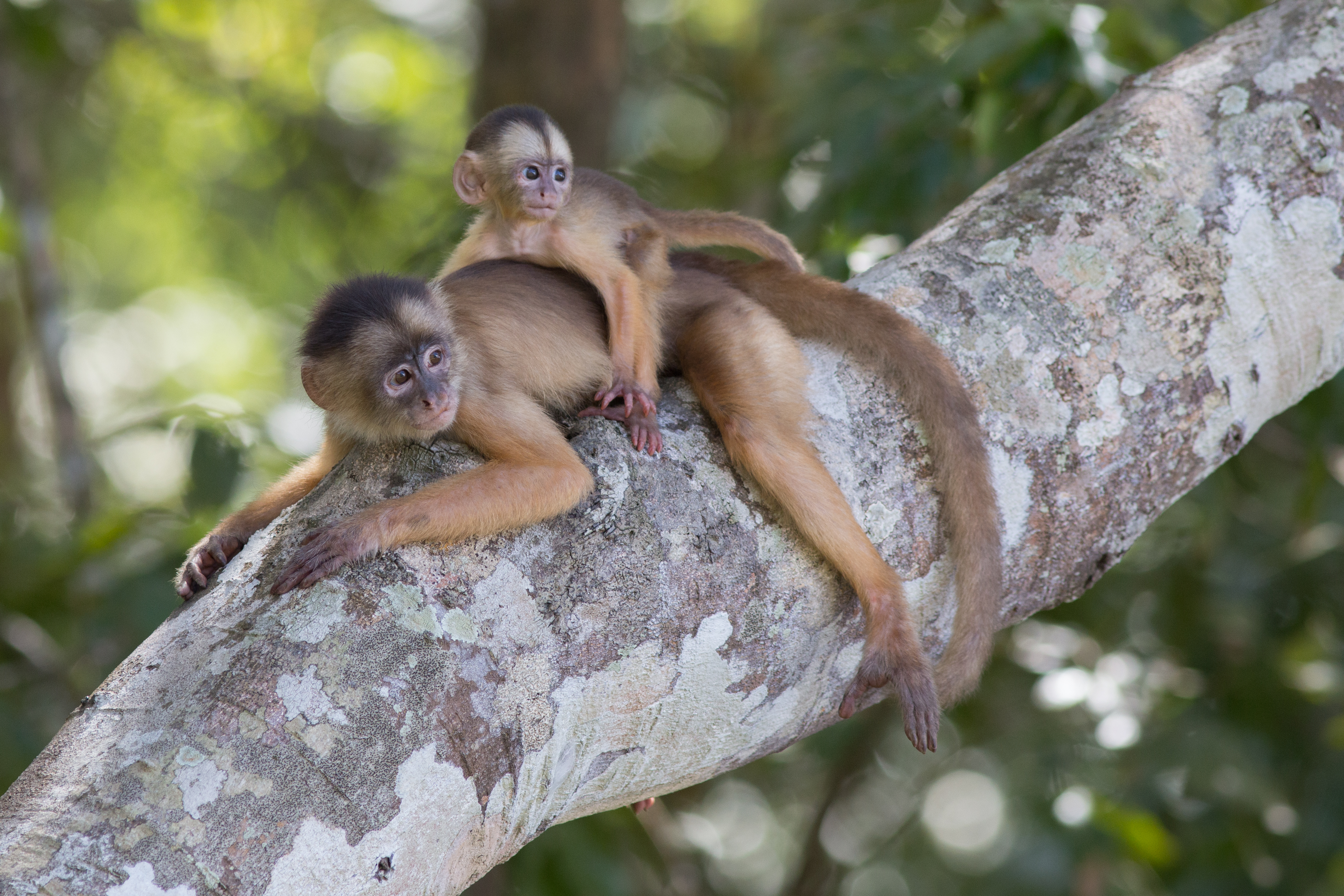

Conservation status
- Least Concern (IUCN 3.1)

Scientific classification
- Kingdom: Animalia
- Phylum: Chordata
- Class: Mammalia
- Order: Primates
- Suborder: Haplorhini
- Family: Cebidae
- Genus: Cebus
- Species: C. albifrons

Binomial name
- Cebus albifrons (Humboldt, 1812)

Subspecies
- C. a. albifrons (Humboldt, 1812); ?C. a. trinitatis Pusch, 1942
- Humboldt's White-Fronted Capuchin (Cebus Albifrons) Range

= Humboldt's white-fronted capuchin =

Species of New World monkey

Humboldt's white-fronted capuchin (Cebus albifrons) is a species of gracile capuchin monkey. It is found in Colombia, Venezuela, Brazil, and potentially the island of Trinidad.

== Taxonomy ==
The species name Cebus albifrons was formerly considered to also include several types of white-fronted capuchin monkey which are now regarded as separate species based on genetic studies by Boubli and Lynch Alfaro.

=== Trinidad white-fronted capuchin ===
Boubli et al. found in a 2012 study that the capuchins on Trinidad, previously classified as C. albifrons trinitatis, had derived from within C. olivaceus brunneus (or more specifically, the mitochondrial genes of the single Trinidad specimen they sampled derived from brunneus). However, the physical differences amongst Trinidad populations have cast doubt on this categorization. Further complicating this taxonomy is the fact that subsequent morphological inspection of the C. brunneus specimens used for the study found them to be distinct from the actual type specimen of C. brunneus. Due to this controversy, taxonomic authorities take differing views on the Trinidad capuchins; the IUCN Red List classifies them as a distinct, critically endangered species (C. trinitatis), the American Society of Mammalogists recognizes them as conspecific with C. brunneus, and the ITIS considers them a subspecies of the white-fronted capuchin (C. a. trinitatis).

== Habitat and distribution ==
Humboldt's white-fronted capuchin is found in eastern Colombia, southern Venezuela, northern Brazil, and potentially Trinidad. It prefers primary forest but is also found in various types of secondary forest. It tends to prefer moister and less disturbed forest than other capuchin species.

The species has been classified as "least concern" from a conservation standpoint by the International Union for Conservation of Nature. However, the Trinidad subspecies is classified as Critically Endangered, having a population of only 50 mature individuals.

== Description ==
The head and body length of Humboldt's white-fronted capuchins is about 37.5 cm (14.8 in). Tail length for males is about 42.5 cm (16.7 in) and it is between 41 and 46 cm (16 and 18 in) for females. Males weigh about 2.40 kg (5.3 lb) and females weigh about 2.23 kg (4.9 lb). They have grayish brown fur on the back with darker limbs and yellowish brown hands and feet. The front is cream colored. Their face is pink and they have a dark brown wedge-shaped cap which is clearly separated from the lighter forehead.

== Ecology ==
The diet is varied, including fruits (such as palm nuts and figs), insects, insect larvae, other invertebrates, reptiles such as lizards, birds, bird eggs, small mammals, flowers, nectar, honey, leaves, nuts, palms, stems, seeds and tree frogs. Individuals in Jaú National Park in Brazil have been observed eating Podocnemis turtle eggs by raiding nests on the Igapó floor when the Igapó is not flooded. Humboldt's white-fronted capuchin has been known to rub or bang food items against hard surfaces. It sometimes associates with squirrel monkeys, tufted capuchins, brown woolly monkeys and Venezuelan red howler monkeys. Both the Humboldt's squirrel monkey and the Ecuadorian squirrel monkey live within the range of Humboldt's white-fronted capuchin. Predators include the black-and-white hawk-eagle, the ornate hawk-eagle, the tayra and the harpy eagle.

Humboldt's white-fronted capuchin has a maximum lifespan of about 44 years. It lives in multi-male groups and males form dominance hierarchies. Males participate in caring for and protecting infants. Infants are born at any time of year after a gestation period of between 162 and 180 days.

Thomas Defler studied Humboldt's white-fronted capuchins in El Tuparro National Natural Park. Adult males were tolerant of each other in the group, but were very aggressive towards males of other groups. Defler observed intergroup aggressive behavior, which resulted in one group fleeing towards the central parts of their territory. All members of the group were conscious of and responded to the alpha male's actions. The alpha male protected the rest of the group in the presence of any danger. Other members of the group also sought physical contact with the alpha male when threatening other group members.

Defler observed Humboldt's white-fronted capuchin in the presence of both three-striped night monkeys and Venezuelan red howlers. He observed no direct interaction between the capuchins and night monkeys, other than the night monkeys watching when capuchins passed their nests, although he observed that there was some competition between the two for the fruit of certain Ficus and Plumeriensis trees – the night monkeys would eat the fruit at night and the capuchins would eat fruit from the same tree during the day. In interactions with the red howlers, sometimes the howlers moved away from the capuchins but other times they would eat together in the same tree.
