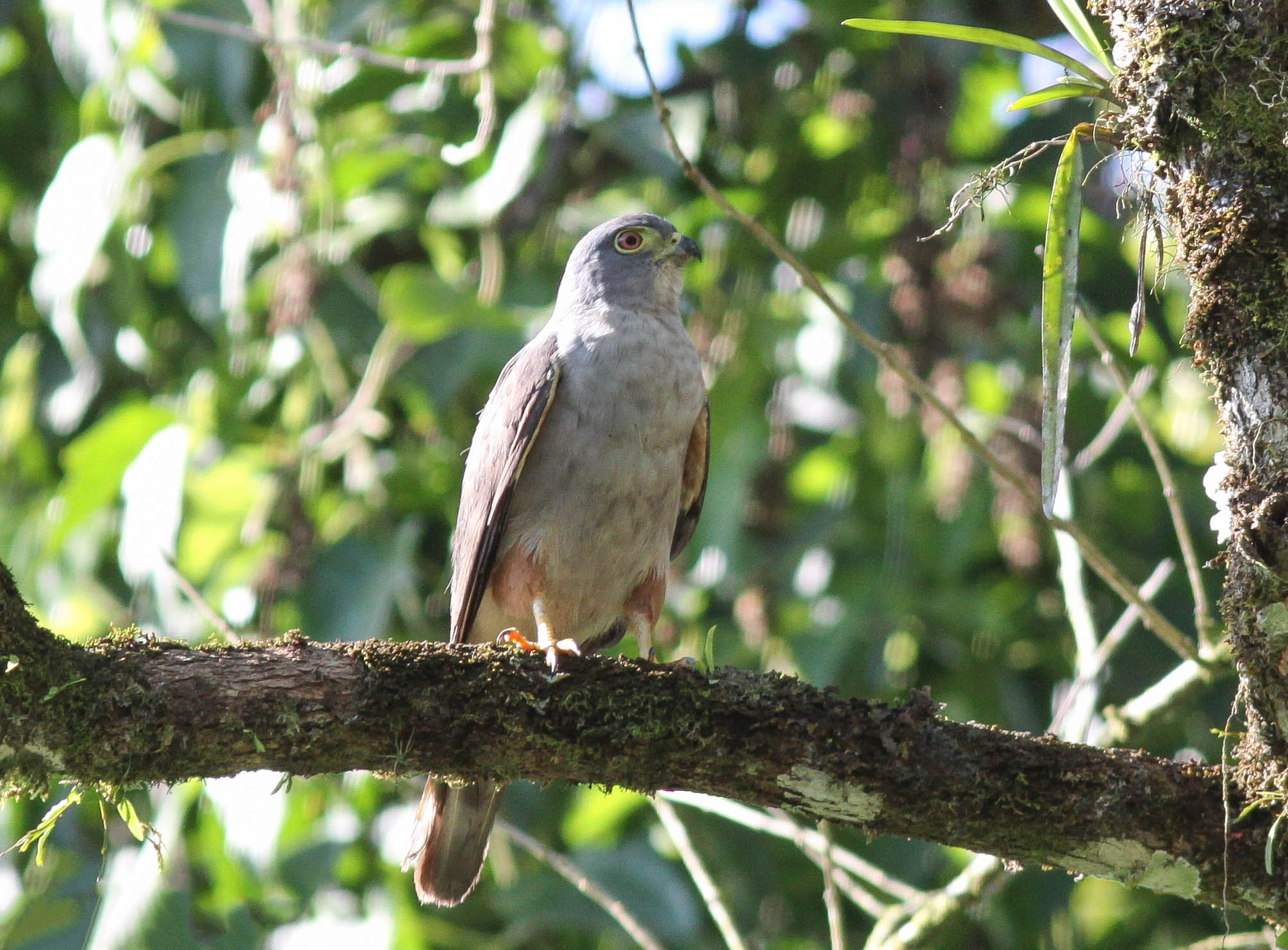
- Rufous-thighed kite (Harpagus diodon)

Scientific classification
- Kingdom: Animalia
- Phylum: Chordata
- Class: Aves
- Order: Accipitriformes
- Family: Accipitridae
- Subfamily: Harpaginae; Bonaparte, 1854

= Harpaginae =

Subfamily of birds

Harpaginae is a subfamily of the bird of prey family Accipitridae. The species are found in Central and South America.

The subfamily was introduced (as Harpageae) by the French naturalist Charles Lucien Bonaparte in 1854 with Harpagus Vigors, 1824 as the type genus.

The genera Microspizias and Harpagus have in the past been placed in a subfamily Milvinae but molecular phylogenetic studies have shown that such a grouping is polyphyletic for Buteoninae.

== Species ==
The subfamily contains four species in two genera:

- Microspizias
  - Tiny hawk (Microspizias superciliosus)
  - Semicollared hawk (Microspizias collaris)
- Harpagus
  - Double-toothed kite (Harpagus bidentatus)
  - Rufous-thighed kite (Harpagus diodon)
