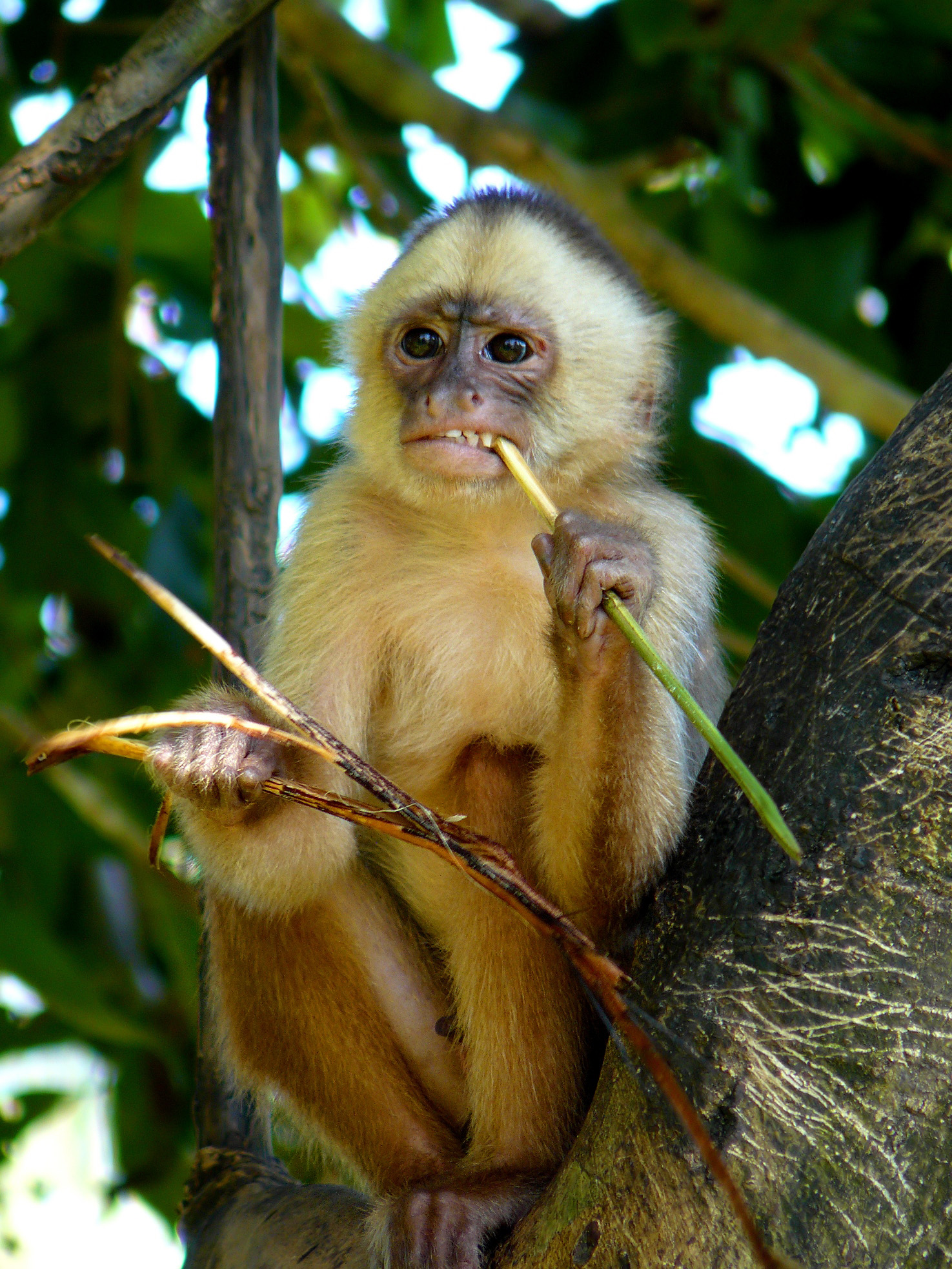

Scientific classification
- Kingdom: Animalia
- Phylum: Chordata
- Class: Mammalia
- Order: Primates
- Suborder: Haplorhini
- Family: Cebidae
- Subfamily: Cebinae
- Genus: Cebus

Groups included
- Cebus aequatorialis; Cebus albifrons; Cebus cesarae; Cebus cuscinus; Cebus leucocephalus; Cebus malitiosus; Cebus trinitatis; Cebus unicolor; Cebus versicolor; Cebus yuracus
- Geographic range of the various white-fronted capuchin species in South America

Cladistically included but traditionally excluded taxa
- Cebus brunneus; Cebus capucinus; Cebus imitator; Cebus kaapori; Cebus olivaceus

= White-fronted capuchin =

Common name for several monkey species

White-fronted capuchin can refer to any of a number of species of gracile capuchin monkey which used to be considered as the single species Cebus albifrons. White-fronted capuchins are found in seven different countries in South America: Bolivia, Brazil, Colombia, Venezuela, Ecuador, Peru, and Trinidad and Tobago.

White-fronted capuchins are medium-sized monkeys with a light brown back and a creamy white underside. Like other capuchin monkeys, they are omnivorous, feeding primarily on fruits, invertebrates, other plant parts and sometimes small vertebrates. They are predated upon primarily by raptors and probably small cats, especially the margay, though snakes have been known to attack them. They are polygamous primates and live in fairly large groups of 15 to 35 individuals. Reproductive females give birth to a single young at biennial intervals. They maintain home ranges of 1.2 to 1.5 km^{2} (0.46 to 0.58 sq mi) and have complex vocal repertoires. They are among the few primates to have been observed crafting and utilising tools in the wild.

White-fronted capuchins are common and widespread, although their population may be declining. The decline is believed to be caused by human-induced habitat loss and degradation, and hunting. In 2008 the International Union for Conservation of Nature (IUCN) classified the Ecuadorian white-fronted capuchin (C. equatorialis) and the Trinidad white-fronted capuchin (formerly regarded as C. albifrons trinitatis) as "critically endangered," and the varied white-fronted capuchin (Cebus versicolor) in Colombia as "endangered." The total population of the Trinidad subspecies was 61 at the last census.

== Taxonomy ==
Even when the white-fronted capuchins were all considered to belong to a single species, there were problems with its name, description and type locality. The holotype does not exist; the original description by Alexander von Humboldt in 1812 describes an animal that is much darker (grayish) than those that exist close to the type locality, and the description includes a dark tail tip, a character that is completely unknown in any population of the species. Additionally, the animal which von Humboldt examined was a tame animal in Maipures, where the species is not found. The closest population is about three kilometers to the north, on the other side of the Tuparro River.

Defler and Hernandez established a phenotype from the population that was called Cebus albifrons albifrons by Hernández C. and Cooper. Another problem has been that the taxon C. a. unicolor described by Spix (1823) and further defined by Hershkovitz was indistinguishable from C. a. albinos; the two are synonymous.

=== Taxonomic classification ===
Hershkovitz (1949) originally named 13 subspecies, while Hernández-Camacho and Cooper (1976) described eight subspecies for Colombia. Colin Groves assessed the species in 2001, further reducing the number. One notable subspecies outside of Colombia is the critically endangered Trinidad white-fronted capuchin. The following subspecies were recognised by assessors working for the IUCN as of 2015.

- Ecuadorian white-fronted capuchin, Cebus albifrons aequatorialis, found in western Ecuador and Peru (critically endangered).
- White-fronted capuchin, Cebus albifrons albifrons, found in Bolivia, Brazil, Colombia, Peru and Venezuela.
- Río Cesar white-fronted capuchin, Cebus albifrons cesarae, found in Colombia.
- Shock-headed capuchin, Cebus albifrons cuscinus, found in Bolivia, Brazil, Ecuador and Peru.
- Santa Marta white-fronted capuchin, Cebus albifrons malitiosus, found along the northern flanks of the Sierra Nevada de Santa Marta in Colombia.
- Trinidad white-fronted capuchin, Cebus albifrons trinitatis, 61 individuals estimated on the island of Trinidad in 2008 (critically endangered).
- Varied white-fronted capuchin, Cebus albifrons versicolor, found in Colombia (endangered).

The IUCN list differs from that by Groves (2005) in that Groves excluded C. a. cesarae and C. a. malitiosus but included C. a. unicolor as a subspecies. In the Handbook of the Mammals of the World (2013) Mittermeier and Rylands limit C. albifrons to gracile capuchins found in the upper Amazon basin in southern Venezuela, southern and eastern Colombia and northwest Brazil, based largely on the work of Jean Boubli, Thomas Defler and Jorge Hernández-Camacho. In particular, the following forms that had previously been considered subspecies or populations of C. albifrons have been reclassified as separate species:

- Humboldt's white-fronted capuchin, Cebus albifrons
- Marañón white-fronted capuchin, Cebus yuracus
- Shock-headed capuchin, Cebus cuscinus
- Spix's white-fronted capuchin, Cebus unicolor
- Sierra de Perijá white-fronted capuchin, Cebus leucocephalus
- Río Cesar white-fronted capuchin, Cebus cesarae
- Varied white-fronted capuchin, Cebus versicolor
- Santa Marta white-fronted capuchin, Cebus malitiosus
- Ecuadorian white-fronted capuchin, Cebus aequatorialis

Mittermeier and Rylands consider the Trinidad white-fronted capuchin to be synonymous with the brown weeper capuchin (C. brunneus), but other authors including the IUCN regard it as a separate species, C. trinitatis.

The difficulties in identifying separate subspecies and species have been pronounced. Hernández-Camacho and Cooper reported some specimens of capuchin from the Barranquilla animal market had supposedly come from the middle valley of the San Jorge River. It is difficult to determine whether these are white-faced capuchins (Cebus capucinus) or white-fronted capuchins. Intermediate characteristics include a dark crown that is high and removed from the forehead. The white parts on the face are more distinctively bald and the outside parts of the arms and legs are more clear; this suggests they are white-headed capuchin. Some specimens of C. versicolor seen in the market at Magangué‚ and probably captured in the lower Cauca River, show similar tendencies to the above, except that there is no increase in the dark pigmentation. Based on these observations and on various "intermediate" specimens from northern Colombia, it is possible that an investigation of the contact zone between the white-headed capuchin and white-fronted capuchin ultimately could show that these forms are conspecific, or that some species of white-fronted capuchin are actually more closely related to white-faced capuchins than they are to other white-fronted capuchins. Another critical zone for this analysis is an area in northeast Ecuador where C. aecuatoriales and white-faced capuchins are found, although neither sympatric distributions or intergradation have as yet been determined.

== Description ==
Male white-fronted capuchins usually weigh an average of 3.4 kg (7.5 lb) and the females an average of 2.9 kg (6.4 lb), although a male on Mirití-Paraná in Colombia weighed 5.5 kg (12 lb). This primate is usually maroon-white or palomino and creamy white. It has short fingers and an opposable thumb. Like other capuchins its premolars are large, and it has square-shaped molar with a thick enamel to help with cracking nuts. Below are descriptions of the known species for Colombia.

- Humboldt's white-fronted capuchin, Cebus albifrons, is found in eastern Vichada, close to the type locality, and was defined by von Humboldt using a tame animal maintained by humans (and a pig) in the village of Maipures. The original description of von Humboldt described an ashy gray animal with a black tail tip, characteristics that are not typical of any known population of white-fronted capuchin. The C. albifrons located three kilometers to the north of Maipures are very light colored animals with yellowish or reddish tones, very similar to the population of Arauca.
- Spix' white-fronted capuchin, Cebus unicolor is also very light colored with yellowish tones and was once thought to be a likely synonym of C. albifrons. One population of very pallid coloration is found in Arauca, the northern part of Boyacá and the eastern part of Norte de Santander and probably represents C. a. albifrons.
- The Río Cesar white-fronted capuchin, Cebus cesarae is very light in color and quite well-defined as a subspecies. "The cap is cinnamon or snuff-brown; median dorsal region, forearm and forelag with orangeous and contrasted with sides of back and trunk; hairs of belly and chest ochracous-orange to pale ochraceous-buff and silvery; contrasting pale area of front extending over variable amounts of upper surface of shoulder and inner side of upper arm" (Hershkovitz, 1949).
- The Santa Marta white-fronted capuchin, Cebus malitiosus, is characterized by a color that is rather dark brown over almost the entire body with yellowish shoulders. "Pale area of front less extensive, upperparts and limbs paler than in hypoleucus. Cap prout's brown, median dorsal region cinnamon brown, forearm and foreleg not markedly contrasting in color with back and sides of body; hairs of belly and chest ochraceous-tawny to cinnamon-brown and silvery; contrasting pale area of front extending well over upper surface of shoulder and inner side of upper arm" (Hershkovitz, 1949).
- The varied white-fronted capuchin, Cebus versicolor, is a complex which includes dark populations and lighter populations. It includes the former subspecies C. a. pleei. and was once thought to also include the Sierra de Perijá white-fronted capuchin, C. leucocephalus. Herskovitz's description of C. a. pleei is of a very reddish animal, particularly in its limbs while his description of C. a. versicolor is a lighter red. He described C. a. leucocephalus as a dark brown animal with reddish tonalities in the hind legs. Nevertheless, Hernández-Camacho and Cooper discussed evidence that the three subspecies (C. a. leucocephalus, C. a. pleei and C. a. versicolor) could be subsumed into one subspecies (C. a. versicolor), since the variations seem to be found in a very well-defined zone and even in the same groups, close to Barrancabermeja on the eastern bank of the middle Magdalena River in the Department of Santander. This suggested to them that the dark phase (C. a. leucocephalus) and the light phase (C. a. pleei) are extremes of an intermediate (C. a. versicolor). Boubli's research suggested that C. a. pleei may be synonymous with C. versicolor but was more likely synonymous with C. cesarae, which he found to be closely related to C. versicolor. Boubli found C. a. leucocephalus to be a separate species.
- The shock-headed capuchin, Cebus cuscinus, is found south of the Guamués River and colored a light brown.

== Geographic range and habitat ==
White-fronted capuchins are found in a variety of forest types. In Vichada it exploits a more xeric habitat in terms of drainage, compared with the tufted capuchin, which tends to be found in forests that are more mesophytic. It is also found in flooded forests. The white-fronted capuchin survives well in forests growing over white sand and in forests of "high caatinga" growing in the rocks and gravel at the foot of mesas.

In Colombia, white-fronted capuchins are found from the northern slopes of the Sierra de Santa Marta to the south, in the valley of the Magdalena River to an as yet undefined point in the Department of Tolima and in the valley of the lower Cauca River, to the eastern parts of central Antioquia and the southern parts of Sucre to the west. In Guajira the species is found to Riohacha, and an isolated population is apparently found in the Serranía de Macuira, though this needs confirmation. They are also found along the slopes of the Serranía de Perijá and the Cordillera Oriental. To the east of the Cordillera they are found in Norte de Santander, western Arauca, in eastern Vichada between the Meta and Tuparro rivers, and then south of the Vichada River; although east of the Ariari River, not including the Ariari itself. It is not known whether they are found in the rather extensive forests of the upper Manacasías River in Meta. South of the Guayabero and Guaviare River, white-fronted capuchins are found throughout the Amazon. The species is known to an altitude of 1,500–2,000 m (0.93–1.24 mi) in the Department of Tolima.

Outside of Colombia, white-fronted capuchins are found from the Andes throughout eastern Ecuador, Peru and northern Bolivia to the Tapajós river in Brazil, south of the Amazon River. North of the Amazon River they are found in the southern parts of the Venezuelan Federal State of Amazonas and in northern Brazil between Colombia and the Branco River. There are isolated populations of the Ecuadorian white-fronted capuchin (C. aequatorialis) in the Pacific Equatorial Forest, with at least three troops present in the premontane cloud forest and moist transitional forest of the Jama-Coaque Reserve (Reserva Jama-Coaque) along the coastal equatorial mountain range in the province of Manabi, Ecuador.

Humboldt's white-fronted capuchin, Cebus albifrons, is very common in the eastern half of El Tuparro National Park, Colombia. It is less common in Amacayacu National Park. Cebus a. yuracus is known south of the Putumayo River. Cebus versicolor is widespread on the middle-Magdalena River and is observable in preserved woodlots of protected fincas. Cebus malitiosus is easy to observe in Tayrona National Park, east of Santa Marta. Cebus a. cesarae can be located in the Serranía del Perijá east of Valledupar, Cesar also in Colombia.

== Behavior and ecology ==
White-fronted capuchins have been studied in Colombia by Defler, in two different sites in Peru by Soini and Terborgh, in Trinidad by Phillips and in Ecuador by Matthews.

In eastern Vichada, Colombia, white-fronted capuchins are found in large groups of around 35 individuals, while to the south in closed forest (perhaps as a result of competition with the tufted capuchin) they have an average group size of 8–15 individuals. A group in Vichada used a home range of about 1.2 km^{2} (0.46 sq mi), while Terborgh found a home range of more than 1.50 km^{2} (0.58 sq mi) and Matthews calculated 240 hectares (590 acres). Near the type locality in gallery forest and islands of forest in Vichada, they have an ecological density of around 30 individuals/km^{2}. In forests with closed-canopy in Colombia and in southern Vichada, many areas have very low densities. Around the lower Apaporis River, for example, densities are less than one individual/km^{2} and the size of the groups is around 15 individuals. Low densities in many parts of the Colombian Amazon make it difficult to detect the presence of the species in many parts.

Terborgh found an average of 1,800 metres (1.1 mi) for the day range of a group, and calculated the following time budget of the study group in Manú National Park, Peru: 18% rest, 21% travel, 22% feeding on plant material and 39% feeding on insects; total feeding 61%. Matthews however, registered 54% foraging, 25% moving and 21% feeding and socializing. They are primarily quadrupedal, although they utilize a great variety of gallops, jumps, falls and climbing. During certain times of the year they are extremely terrestrial, especially when there is a scarcity of available fruits and the troop must search for arthropods in the dry leaves of the forest floor. In some parts of the Llanos Orientales they are found walking over the grassy savanna between forests, leaving well-beaten trails. In Vichada it uses preferential trees for sleeping at heights of 25–30 metres (82–98 ft). The palm Attalea regia is often used for sleeping in this zone.

=== Diet ===
All species of capuchin tend to have a rather similar diet in broad terms; they are omnivores, eating fruits and small invertebrates, small vertebrates and birds' eggs, which they forage at all levels of the forest, frequently descending to the forest floor. In northern Colombia during the dry season when there are few fruits to be found, white-fronted capuchins spend more than half their time on the ground, searching for and capturing small prey. They are extremely good at manipulating objects, and spend a great deal of time examining dry leaves from which they collect invertebrates (for example small beetles and ants' eggs) from rolled up leaves. They hunt frogs and drink the water which accumulates in the spaces between the bracteoles of the common plant Phenakospermum guianense, where the frogs hide. Hunting amphibians seems to be a cultural phenomenon which the members of each group learn. P. guianense is commonly present in large, dense stands in some types of forest.

In Manú National Park the animal material in the diet includes frogs, lizards, small mammals and birds' eggs as well as many invertebrates, including orthopterans, lepidopterans and hymenopterans (especially ants and wasp larvae). In the Pacaya–Samiria National Reservation, they have been observed eating tent caterpillars. Terborgh identified 73 species of plants from 33 families consumed by this primate. The Moraceae was the most important family by a wide margin, counting the number of species (17) eaten, equivalent to 23.3% of all plant species consumed. Importance values for plant families consumed by the white-fronted capuchin in one study are as follows: Moraceae (17, 23.3%); Leguminosae (5, 6.8%); Araceae (4, 5.5%); Bombacaceae (4, 5.5%); Palmae (4, 5.5%).

Defler collected 40 species of plants from 23 families eaten by white-fronted capuchins in Vichada according to species consumed per family: Arecaceae (7); Moraceae (6); Chrysobalanaceae (3); Leguminosae (3); Passifloraceae (2); Bromeliaceae (2); Burseraceae (2); Bombacaceae (1); Celastraceae (1); Connaraceae (1); Euphorbiaceae (1); Lecythidaceae (1); Maranthaceae (1); Melastomataceae (1); Anacardiaceae (1); Myrtaceae (1); Annonaceae (1); Musaceae (1); Apocynaceae (1); Orchidaceae (1); Araceae (1); Rubiaceae (1); Bignoriaceae (1).

In terms of importance value, palms are highly valued by all species of capuchin. In El Tuparro National Park in Colombia, the palm Attalea regiae was a key species for white-fronted capuchins, the nuts being a principal food. In Manú National Park in Peru the palms Astrocaryum and Attalea were the most important palm genera, but perhaps not at the same level as Attalea in El Tuparro. Also, at Manú various species of Ficus were very important to white-fronted capuchins; this emphasis on Ficus was not observed in the El Tuparro study, although this study did not include an entire year. Nevertheless, research on other species suggests the importance of palms as "key species" and the lack of importance of Ficus in such habitats as gallery forests in the llanos of Colombia and Venezuela, contrasts with their high importance in more fertile habitats like Manú.

White-fronted capuchins take advantage of almost any water source, drinking water from tree holes when available, but also drinking from brooks and springs when necessary. During the driest season in Vichada the group studied by Defler went to the ground every day to a water seep from under a huge boulder, which was the only water source available in their home range.

=== Reproduction ===
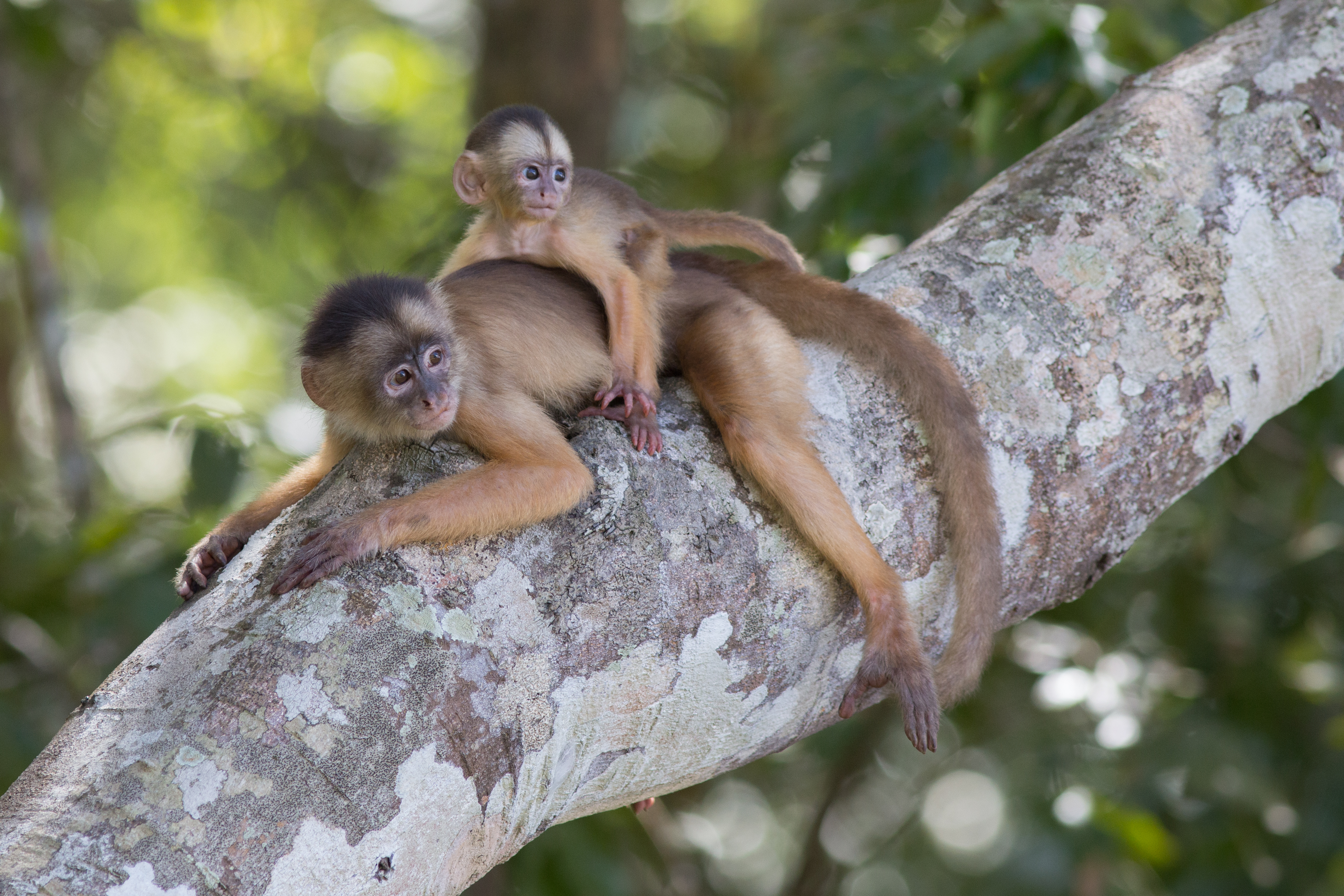
Humboldt's white-fronted capuchin and baby

White-fronted capuchins are polygamous. The male mounts the female, holding her legs with his hind feet, and copulates with her for a few minutes. Although the time of gestation is unknown, it is probably around 160 days like the tufted capuchin. Usually one infant is born. Observations of a newborn in El Tuparro National Park showed the process by which the newborn discovered the appropriate position for riding on the mother. Newborns ride oriented sideways over the mothers' shoulders, but during the first days the baby holds on to any part of the mother such as the base of the tail, the tail, the legs, and the arms before discovering and learning that the position over the shoulders is best and most secure. After several weeks the baby makes the change from the sideways position over the shoulders to riding on her back.

All the members of the troop are interested in the newborn, and they take advantage of any opportunity to examine and look at its genitals if the mother permits it. With time the baby begins to climb up on other members of the troop, including the adult males who are interested in protecting the little one. Playing behavior is principally with a companion, and all members of the troop from the alpha male, the mother and all young members of the group solicit play with the young one.

=== Social structure ===
Adult males are notably tolerant of each other in the group, but they are very aggressive towards males of other groups. Defler observed intergroup aggressive behavior among Humboldt's white-fronted capuchins in El Tuparro, which resulted in one group fleeing towards the central parts of their territory. Alpha males seem to exercise a "control position" at the center of the group, since all members are extremely conscious and alert to his location, and they all observe his reactions. If the alpha reacts with intense fear or panic or if he pays close attention to something, all members of the troop react similarly. The presence of adult males seems to lend psychological support to the smaller adult females. Defler noticed that more timid females often became quite aggressive towards him when a male appeared on the scene, although the females often needed to press up against the flank of the male for reassurance.

=== Communication ===
Vocalizations are variable, and some are listed as follows: (1) ua – a soft bark given repeatedly and used by all members of the group when danger is perceived; (2) ya – excited animals around the alpha, towards alpha and towards perceived danger; (3) eh-eh – threat towards potential danger, but especially adult females; accompanied with open mouth showing teeth (OMT); (4) squeaky hinge – threat given especially by young animals; (5) squeal – conflict within the group during a fight; (6) whistle – conflict in the group of a young animal; (7) ahr – a lost animal; others answer this call, apparently to direct it back to the group; (8) uh!uh!uh! – a common vocalization during feeding which may allow contact to be maintained and show general contentment; (9) uch!uch! – an animal trying to keep up with the group; (10) warble – young animals establishing contact or coming close to an adult; (11) purr – close and pacific contact; (12) chirriar – pacific interaction of young ones during play.

Perhaps the most important display is the behavior of breaking branches, which all members of the group carry out. Even infants break small branches (or twigs), letting them fall to the soil, but the most spectacular is the alpha male who chooses large, dry branches which he hits with his hands and feet in spectacular jumps, so that they fall. Usually such branches make a tremendous sound as they fall through the other branches, and the members of the group become very excited and chatter loudly. This behavior is quite commonly discharged towards an observer when the animals have lost their fear.

=== Tool use ===
Trinidad white-fronted capuchins have been observed using leaves as cups to drink water from tree cavities. The leaves used were modified before by changing the shape of the leaf. The leaves are discarded after one use, meaning that a different leaf is used for repeat visits. These observations suggest that, like the common chimpanzee, wild capuchins demonstrate tool manufacture and use in foraging-related contexts.

=== Interspecific interactions and predators ===
White-fronted capuchins frequently travel with squirrel monkeys and also sometimes travel with the tufted capuchin and Venezuelan red howler. The double-toothed kite often accompanies these monkeys, exactly as it does other species of primates. White-fronted capuchins feel threatened by avian predators, and they are very vigilant around any large bird of prey. In Vichada, Colombia, tayra, Boa constrictor and the ornate hawk-eagle have been seen trying to capture white-fronted capuchins. After detecting the tayra and Boa constrictor the members of the troop showed little fear and caution, even though these animals threatened the monkeys. The most common behavior after detecting a potential ground predator is "ya-ya" vocalization and branch breaking over the head of the potential predator, similar to the display of the brown woolly monkey. In contrast, after being frightened by a male ornate hawk-eagle the monkeys screamed intensely only once, then hid quietly, some descending to the ground to sneak away.

== Conservation status ==
White-fronted capuchins are adaptable and have a wide distribution. Nevertheless, some species are under considerable pressure. The Ecuadorian white-fronted capuchin is listed as "critically endangered" by the IUCN, and the varied white-fronted capuchin and Santa Marta white-fronted capuchin are listed as "endangered." The IUCN does not have enough data to evaluate the Río Cesar white-fronted capuchin. Also, the shock-headed capuchin, C. cuscinus, is found only is a small part of the SW Colombian Amazon and probably should be classified as "vulnerable" for the country. We need to census the various subspecies and to clarify the taxonomy in order to evaluate properly the situation within the country. White-fronted capuchins are found within 10–15 National Parks and are probably not excessively hunted. Also, they survive well in secondary vegetation close to human beings
