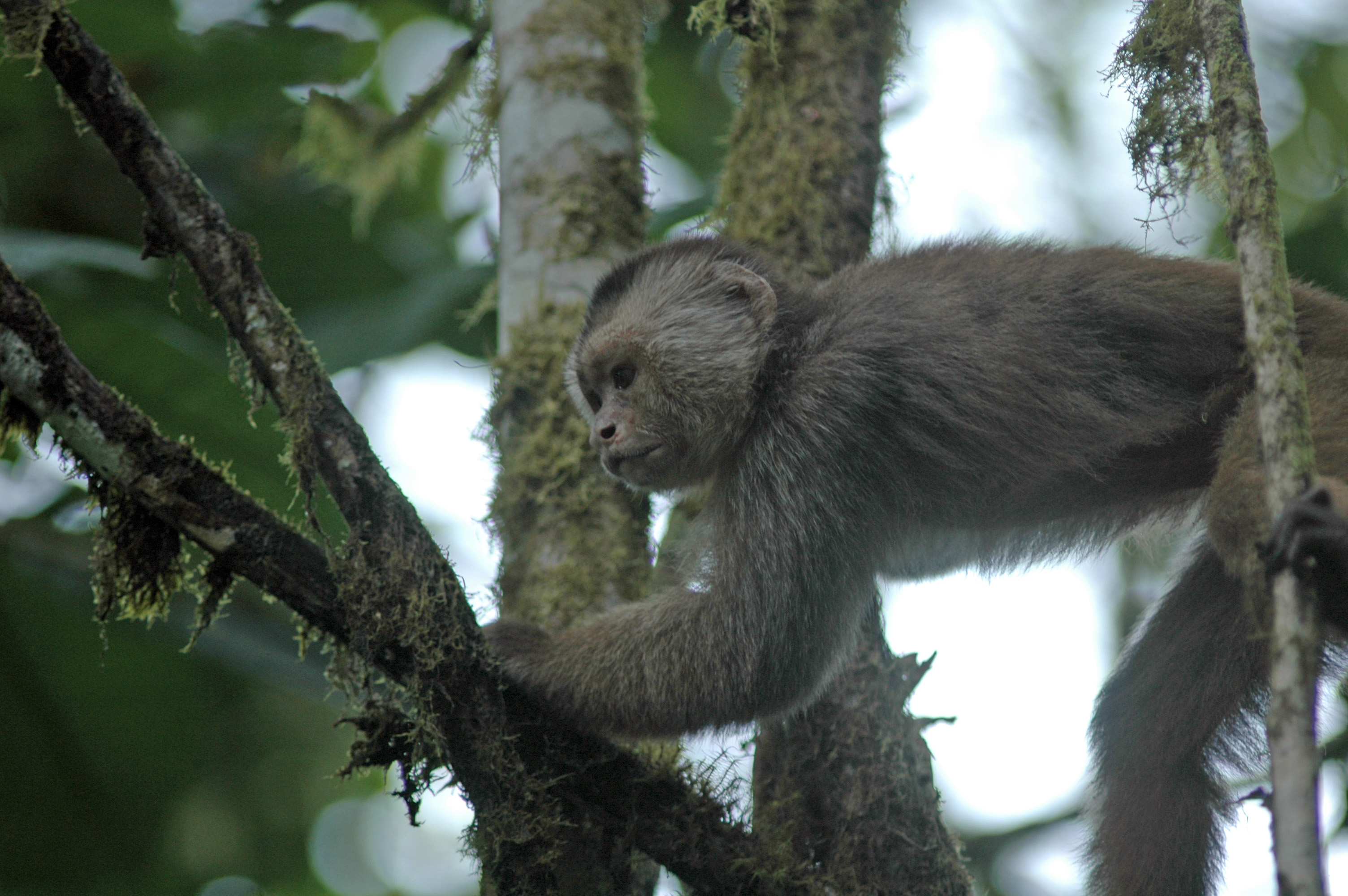

Conservation status
- Critically Endangered (IUCN 3.1)

Scientific classification
- Kingdom: Animalia
- Phylum: Chordata
- Class: Mammalia
- Order: Primates
- Family: Cebidae
- Genus: Cebus
- Species: C. aequatorialis

Binomial name
- Cebus aequatorialis J. A. Allen, 1914

= Ecuadorian capuchin =

Species of New World monkey

The Ecuadorian capuchin (Cebus aequatorialis), or Ecuadorian white-fronted capuchin is a species of gracile capuchin monkey of the family Cebidae. It was formerly classified as a subspecies of the white-fronted capuchin (C. albifrons). Mittermeier and Rylands elevated it to a separate species in 2013. The primary physical distinction between C. albifrons and C. aequatorialis is their coloration. Due to low density and distribution researchers have not been able to make a confident molecular genetic assessment of the C. aequatorialis population, but assign it species status based on geographical isolation, morphological characteristics, and the phylogenetic species concept. The location range of the Ecuadorian Capuchin is from Western lowland Ecuador to North West Peru. The conservation status of the Ecuadorian Capuchin was originally near threatened but was revised in 2008 by the IUCN to critically endangered due to the population's rapid decline. Anthropogenic factors such as habitat fragmentation from rapid deforestation, creation of agricultural lands, and persecution from farmers are to blame for the species' critically endangered status.

== Behavior ==
=== Group structure ===
Ecuadorian Capuchins mainly live in multi-male, multi-female social groups. Social groups tend to hold around 13 individuals, with a range of 5–20. In an observational study, Campos and Jack found that female capuchins outnumbered the males and that there is a high immature to adult female proportion.

=== New behavior ===
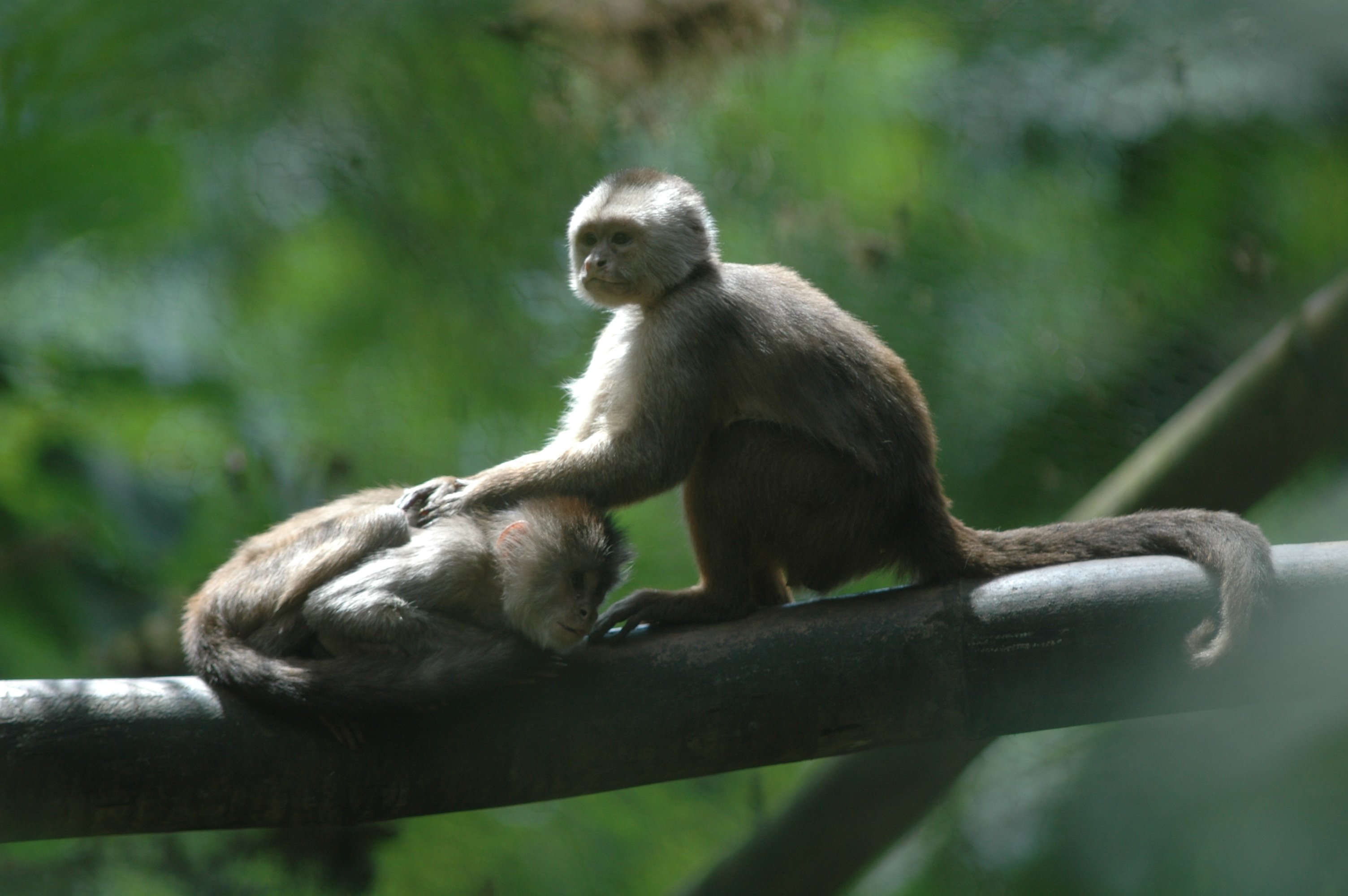
Cebus albifrons aequatorialis

New behaviour has been recorded for the Ecuadorian Capuchin, Guerrero-Casado et al. state that this species was found in a new location of Ecuador within low tree cover which is unusual behaviour, as this species prefers high tree cover. From this study, results showed that during fall/winter when trees lost their leaves and when fruits have fallen, it forces the Ecuadorian Capuchin to come down to forage on the ground. Another reason for this new behaviour can originate from a decrease in food sources from up in trees or due to habitat fragmentation. Habitat fragmentation and environmental factors are forcing the Ecuadorian capuchin to change its behaviours as a coping mechanism to survive.

== Diet ==
The Ecuadorian Capuchin has a varied diet, it includes insects, fruits, and other invertebrate species. In addition, they are known to eat the "base of epiphytic bromeliad leaves because they are tender" (p. 181). However, the most important foods to the Ecuadorian capuchin diet are mainly composed of fruits and invertebrates.

== Habitat and distribution ==
Ecuador on the globe (Ecuador centered)

Suitable habitat for the Ecuadorian Capuchin is determined to be a high percentage of tree cover (most important factor and maximized when over 25%), land cover (as deciduous, evergreen broad leaved, or forested cropland mosaic), mild temperature seasonality, low annual precipitation, and low human population density. According to Tleimat, the Ecuadorian Capuchin requires about 500ha to use their energy expenditure. The dispersal of the Ecuadorian capuchin has been restricted due to deforestation and habitat fragmentation, as a result the distribution range used to be from western Ecuador to northwestern Peru. As a result of Hurtado et al.'s study they state the Ecuadorian capuchin has a low encounter rate with low density through their distribution, and this should make them a high priority for conservation. Through the combination of the IUCN's map and the study of Campos and Jack, the Ecuadorian capuchin has lost over 90% of its habitat. The Ecuadorian Capuchin habitat faces various threats from habitat fragmentation, deforestation, and anthropogenic factors (farmers burning bushes, grazing, and illegal mining/logging).

=== Habitat fragmentation ===
Habitat fragmentation is a severe issue for primates as it restricts movement, there is a higher energy expenditure for the primate to find food, and leads to inbreeding or a decrease in gene flow. Over 98% of the primary forest of western Ecuador is lost and the rest is broken into fragments that are at risk for further removal. In the case of the Ecuadorian capuchin, this species thrives off large tropical dry forests and because of fragmentation it becomes harder to forage for food, as well as there is less room for energy expenditure. In response to habitat fragmentation, a corridor (Three Forest Conservation Corridor) was put in to mitigate the disconnection between patches. A study by Tleimat showed that the Ecuadorian capuchin is utilizing the corridor to connect it to other fragmented forests, so similar conservation techniques can help sustain them.

=== Conservation ===
The forests of Ecuador and Peru are already facing rapid deforestation with only 4% of the forest left. The study conducted by Campos and Jack revealed four important areas that should highly be conserved for the survival of the Ecuadorian capuchin. The Areas identified as the most suitable habitat are the Chongon-Colonche hills near the coast of south-central Ecuador and west of Guayaquil, the northern coast of the Manabí province in Ecuador, the foothills of the Andes Mountains in southern Ecuador, and the Tumbes and Piura regions of northern Peru. Campos and Jack's study revealed that there is 5208km2 of suitable habitat that should be conserved for the wellbeing of the Ecuadorian capuchin and other species, further conservation should focus on the Ecuadorian and Tumbes-Piura tropical dry forests. The area deemed the most important to conserve for the Ecuadorian capuchin is located along the Chongón-Colonche range of coastal mountains in the Guayas and Manabí provinces of Ecuador, this area is chosen due to having a greater extent of continuous and/or undisturbed forest, and the success rate of conservation is favourable as it already has some kind of protection already.

== Relationship with humans ==
There has been a long history of capuchin and human relationships as humans kept them in captivity, like zoos, because of their highly amicable social behaviours and manipulative skills. In addition to captivity, the Ecuadorian capuchin is highly targeted for animal trafficking which contributes to an immediate stop to its gene flow. A negative relationship between humans and the Ecuadorian capuchin is the threat from farmers as the capuchin forages their crops, the common crops that they forage are corn, bananas, plantain and cacao.

=== Parasites ===
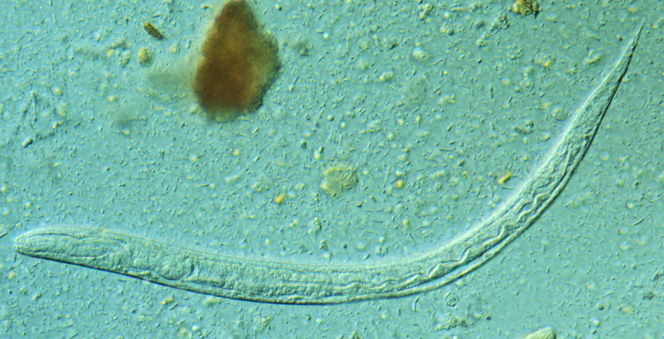
Strongyloides stercoralis larva

Martin et al. studied captive and free-ranging groups of capuchins in the Western Amazon, Ecuador to determine how they are affected by gastrointestinal parasites. The results indicated that 6 parasites were detected across 26 animals where Strongyloides were the most prevalent parasite. According to their study, both groups were in contact with humans who provided food to the primates which forced the primates to spend more time on the ground. This species is an arboreal primate but spends 70% of its time on the ground, making parasite transmission easier since the ground increases the possibility of parasite transmission when larvae come into contact with the skin. Other contributing factors to higher parasite transmission were associated with monkeys drinking from a creek that was contaminated with human feces which came from a nearby village. This study and other studies have demonstrated human interaction with this species increase the possibility of parasite transmission.
