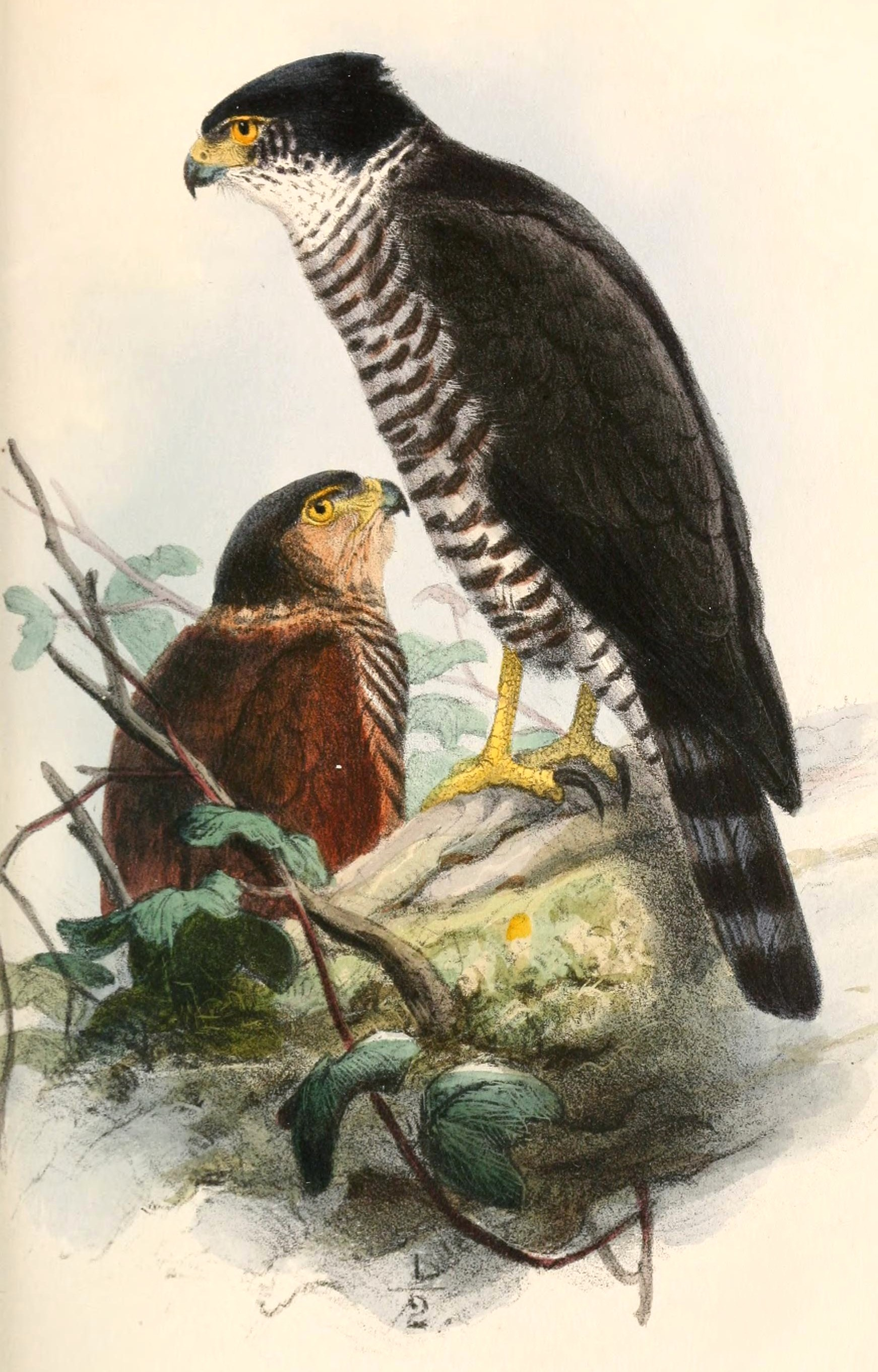

Conservation status
- Least Concern (IUCN 3.1)

Scientific classification
- Kingdom: Animalia
- Phylum: Chordata
- Class: Aves
- Order: Accipitriformes
- Family: Accipitridae
- Genus: Microspizias
- Species: M. collaris

Binomial name
- Microspizias collaris (Sclater, PL, 1860)

Synonyms
- Accipiter collaris Sclater, 1860; Hieraspiza collaris

= Semicollared hawk =

Species of bird

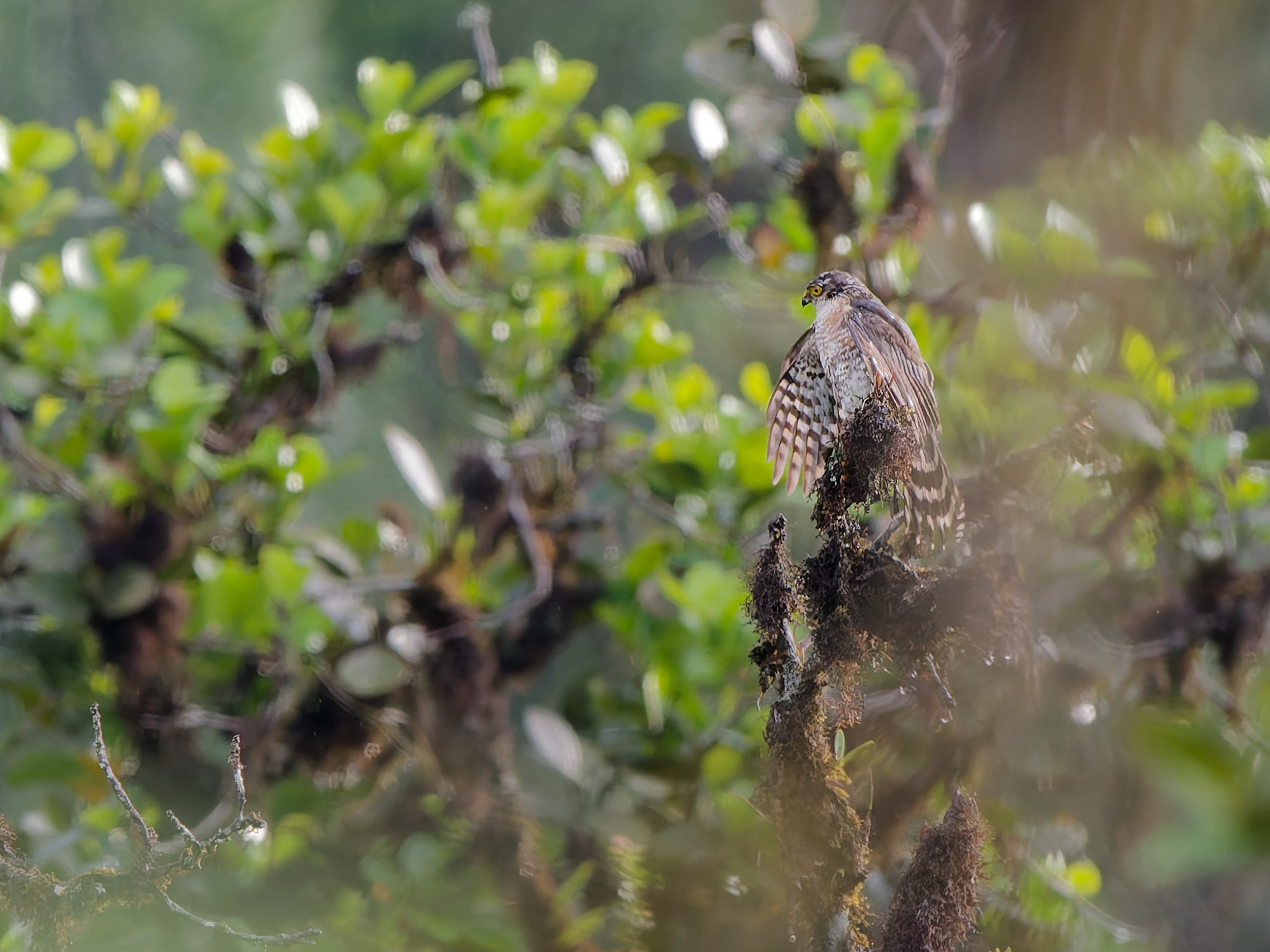
Semicollared hawk perched in the rain

The semicollared hawk (Microspizias collaris) is a rare bird of prey species in the family Accipitridae. It is found in Colombia, Ecuador, Peru, and Venezuela. Its natural habitat is subtropical or tropical moist montane forests. It is potentially being affected by habitat loss.

== Taxonomy ==
Formerly placed in the genus Accipiter, it is the sister species of the tiny hawk (M. superciliosus). The latter was thought to be the only species in Accipiter yet studied which has a large procoracoid foramen. The collaris-superciliosus superspecies also differs from the typical sparrowhawks in other respects of its anatomy and as regards DNA sequence. Consequently, the old genus Hieraspiza may be more appropriate for them. In 2021, a phylogenetic study found it and the semicollared hawk to form a distinct group from the rest of Accipiter, that is sister to Kaupifalco. For this reason, both were reclassified into the new genus Microspizias.

It was formerly thought that the Accipiter collaris formed a superspecies with "A." superciliosus, but it was recently shown that A. superciliosus might not belong in the Accipiter genus. This called into question the traits of defining features of the Accipiter genus, putting Accipiter collaris and other species previously thought to be in the Accipiter genus in an unknown position.

Its current genus name, "Accipiter", is Latin for "hawk", its species name, "collaris", is Latin for "collar", or "neckband"

== Description ==
This is a small, rare hawk that lives in forests in mid elevations. It has black upperparts and a white band on the back of its neck. Its underparts are white, and it can have blotches on its sides. Young semi-collared hawks are more brownish. It usually stays in the forest and preys on smaller birds, occasionally soaring.

When calling to others, semicollared hawks create a high-pitched, almost whistle-like, sound. In addition, some semicollared hawks have been heard singing songs that consist of the repetition of a mid-pitch vvt-vvt sound. These songs also contain a series of four quick high-pitched calls that successively get higher.

== Distribution and habitat ==
This species is known to be non-migratory.

=== Colombia ===
The semicollared hawk is seen (although rarely) in the 600-1800m range in wet and humid forests, but seen more often in the Pacific slope in Antioquia, Valle, and Cauca, in the central Andes in Tolima and Cauca, in the eastern Andes in Norte de Santander, Santa Marta Mountains, and on the eastern slope of the eastern Andes in western Meta.

=== Ecuador ===
They are highly unlikely to live within the subtropical areas on the slopes of the Andes. Recorded from around 1,500 to 2,200 m, the semicollared hawk is only situated in western Napo and Zamora-Chinchipe on the eastern slope and Pichincha on the western slope. One has been spotted in Otanga, in northwestern Ecuador, at 1,900 m. This is neighboring the Mindo-Tandayapa area, where most other records of semi collared hawks have occurred.

=== Venezuela ===
Between 1,300 and 1,800 m in the humid montane forests in the Andes of Táchira, northwest Barinas, and Mérida, there have only been two claims of spotting this species. The semicollared hawk is extremely scarce in this region.

== Behavior ==
=== Diet ===
There is very little information on the feeding behavior of the semi-collared hawk, but In northern Colombia, a male was found with passerine feathers in its stomach. Another semicollared hawk was found chasing Dusky Bush Tanagers at Otanga in the western slopes of the Andes in northwestern Ecuador. These suggest that this species mainly, or only, feeds on birds.

=== Breeding ===
The generation length (average age before parenthood) of this species is 5.1 years.

== Predation and threats ==
Primarily due to agricultural expansion, forestry has declined. While this does not seem to currently affect the population, it may present a threat in the future.
