= Caraipa utilis =

Conservation status
- Vulnerable (IUCN 2.3)

Scientific classification
- Kingdom: Plantae
- Clade: Tracheophytes
- Clade: Angiosperms
- Clade: Eudicots
- Clade: Rosids
- Order: Malpighiales
- Family: Calophyllaceae
- Genus: Caraipa
- Species: C. utilis

Binomial name
- Caraipa utilis R.Vásquez

Species of plant

Caraipa utilis is a species of flowering plant in the Calophyllaceae family. It is found only in Peru.
