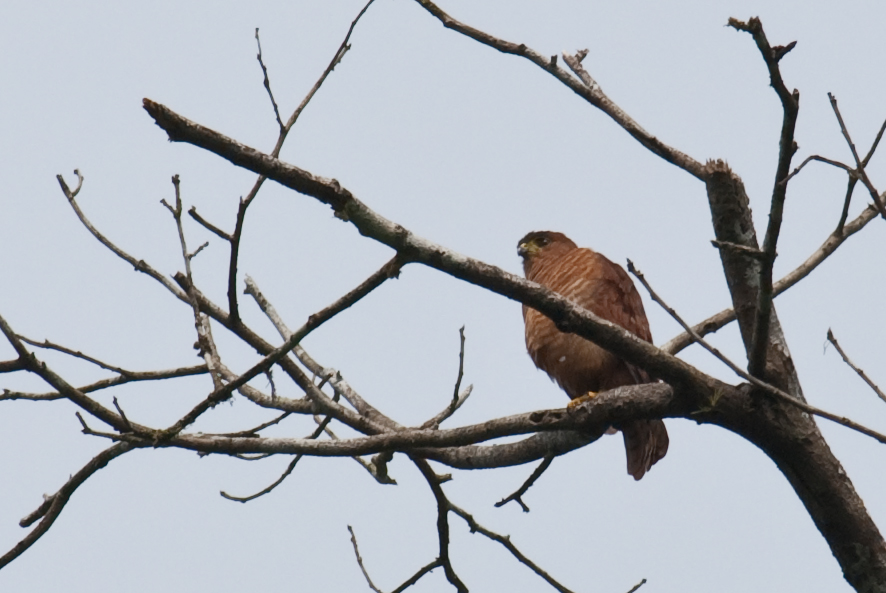

Conservation status
- Least Concern (IUCN 3.1)

Scientific classification
- Kingdom: Animalia
- Phylum: Chordata
- Class: Aves
- Order: Accipitriformes
- Family: Accipitridae
- Genus: Microspizias
- Species: M. superciliosus

Binomial name
- Microspizias superciliosus (Linnaeus, 1766)

Subspecies
- M. s. fontainieri - Bonaparte, 1853; M. s. superciliosus - (Linnaeus, 1766)

Synonyms
- Falco superciliosus Linnaeus, 1766; Accipiter superciliosus Falco tinus Latham, 1790; Nisus tinus (Latham, 1790); Hieraspiza tinus Kaup, 1847; Hieraspiza superciliosa (Linnaeus, 1766) [proposed by Olsen, 2006; see text]

Audio

= Tiny hawk =

Species of bird

The tiny hawk (Microspizias superciliosus) is a small diurnal bird of prey found primarily around humid forests of the Neotropics. It is primarily a bird-eater, and is known to prey on hummingbirds.

== Taxonomy ==
The tiny hawk was formally described by the Swedish naturalist Carl Linnaeus in 1766 in the twelfth edition of his Systema Naturae under the binomial name Falco superciliosus. Linnaeus specified the locality as Suriname. The specific epithet superciliosus is Latin meaning "eye-browed".

There are two subspecies separated by the northern Andes. The two differ most significantly in relative tail length; differences in size and color are small, and can be hard to distinguish.

- Microspizias superciliosus fontanieri (Bonaparte, 1853) – is found from Nicaragua south to western Ecuador. It is somewhat smaller and darker than the nominate M. s. superciliosus, with a shorter tail and sharper, blacker barring below.
- Microspizias superciliosus superciliosus (Linnaeus, 1766) – is found east of the Andes in South America. Slightly larger than fontanieri, it is paler and has diffuse, grayish barring on the underparts.

The tiny hawk and its sister species, the upland-dwelling semicollared hawk (M. collaris), form a superspecies.

When classified in Accipiter, tiny hawk was the only species with a large procoracoid foramen. It also differs from the typical sparrowhawks in other respects of its anatomy and in its DNA sequence. Consequently, its old name Hieraspiza superciliosa may be more appropriate. In 2021, a phylogenetic study found it and the semicollared hawk to form a distinct group from the rest of Accipiter, that is sister to Kaupifalco. For this reason, both were reclassified into the new genus Microspizias.

== Description ==
The tiny hawk is aptly named; males measure 20 cm (7.9 in), about the size of a starling, though females are slightly larger at 26.5 cm (10.5 in). It is one of the smallest true raptors in the world and is one of the smallest Accipiter species, though the little sparrowhawk of Africa is of similar or even smaller size. The birds range in weight from 75 to 120 g (2.6 to 4.2 oz) As with most raptors, there is considerable sexual dimorphism in size, with females measuring up to 25% longer and as much as 60% heavier than males.

The adult male tiny hawk is dark slaty gray above, with a mottled gray face, a paler gray supercilium, and a blackish crown and nape. The white underparts are covered with fine gray barring, except on the unmarked throat. The longish tail is dark with three paler gray bands. Adult females are similar, but browner above with buffier underparts and browner barring below. The cere and legs of all ages are yellow, and the bill, which is relatively heavy, is gray. Adults have red or red-brown irises, while those of immatures often are yellowish. Unlike most accipiters, the tiny hawk's tail is quite short; it is squared or notched at the tip. Its wings are medium-length, with pointed tips, and its legs and toes are long.

Immature birds come in two color morphs: the brown and the rufous. Brown morph birds are dark sooty-brown above, finely barred with black, and white below, heavily barred with cinnamon. Rufous morph immatures are more chestnut above, and barred with rufous (rather than cinnamon) on the underparts. They also have duskier heads and brighter rufous tails than do brown morph birds.

The call of the tiny hawk is a shrill, high-pitched, somewhat quavery series of 20–30 notes of uneven pitch. After an initial few accelerating notes, the call settles into a steady rhythm, variously transcribed as caucau-ca-ca-ca, keer-keer-keer or kree-ree-ree-ree.

== Distribution and habitat ==
Tiny hawks are patchily distributed from eastern Nicaragua down to western Ecuador, northern Bolivia, northern Argentina, Paraguay and southern Brazil. They frequent humid and wet lowland forests (including second growth) and forested foothills from sea level to about 1800 meters (5900 ft), though most records come from elevations below 1000 m (3300 ft). The species is believed to be fairly sedentary.

== Behavior ==
On clear mornings (and occasionally in late afternoons), the tiny hawk will sometimes sun itself on a high open branch. Occasionally, pairs will sun together. Otherwise, this is a secretive species and easily overlooked. It generally hunts from a perch, located anywhere from the undergrowth to the canopy, though most often in the middle story. When hunting in low growth, it often flashes from one perch to another in rapid succession. It is a fast flier; instead of the typical flap-flap-glide cadence of the accipiters, it makes a few quick flaps and then briefly closes its wings before flapping again. Tiny hawks occasionally soar above the forest canopy.

=== Food and feeding ===
Like all accipiters, the tiny hawk feeds primarily on birds. It hunts hummingbirds and small passerines, typically darting out from a place of concealment to snatch them as they pass by, but also ambushing them when the smaller birds are perched. There is some evidence that it learns the regular perches of some hummingbirds and hunts for them there. However, the species cannot be considered a specialist predator of hummingbirds. Some individuals also hunt rodents and bats.

=== Breeding ===
Little is known about tiny hawk breeding biology. Breeding season may vary by location, February through June from Panama to Colombia and October to January in the southern part of the range. The birds are known to build stick nests, at least sometimes in the canopy of tall trees. In Venezuela, there is a record of a pair nesting in an old black-collared hawk nest. Females lay one to three bluish-white eggs, faintly streaked and spotted with brown. Incubation and fledging periods are not known.

== Sources ==
- Ferguson-Lees, James; Christie, David A. (1999). Raptors of the World. London: Christopher Helm. ISBN 0-7136-8026-1.
- Hilty, Steven L. (2003), Birds of Venezuela, London: Christopher Helm, ISBN 0-7136-6418-5
- Olson, Storrs L. (2006). "Reflections on the systematics of Accipiter and the genus for Falco superciliosus Linnaeus" (PDF). Bulletin of the British Ornithologists' Club. 126 (1): 69–70. Archived from the original (PDF) on 2013-10-29. For further information on the procoracoid foramen in the birds of prey, see also Olson (1987) "Variation in the procoracoid foramen in the Accipitridae" Riv. Ital. Orn. 57(3-4):161-164. "The typical and presumably primitive condition in the Accipitridae is to have the procoracoid process with a distinct foramen for the supracoracoideus nerve piercing the bone."
