= Río Cesar white-fronted capuchin =

Conservation status
- Endangered (IUCN 3.1)

Scientific classification
- Kingdom: Animalia
- Phylum: Chordata
- Class: Mammalia
- Infraclass: Placentalia
- Order: Primates
- Family: Cebidae
- Genus: Cebus
- Species: C. cesarae

Binomial name
- Cebus cesarae (Hershkovitz, 1949)
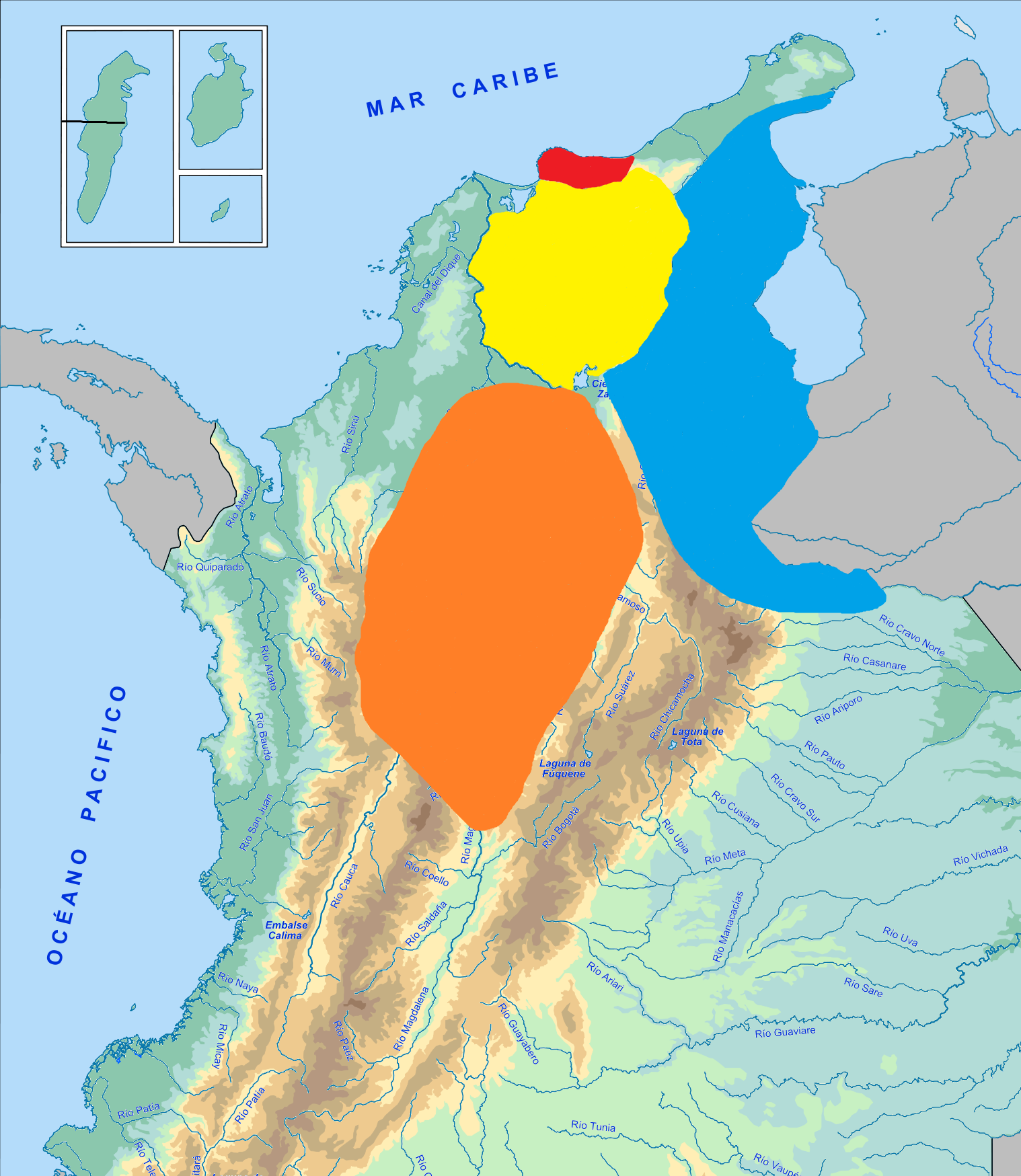
- Range Map Shows In Yellow

Species of New World monkey

The Río Cesar white-fronted capuchin (Cebus cesarae) is a species of gracile capuchin monkey from the Río Cesar Valley in northern Colombia. It had previously been considered a subspecies of the white-fronted capuchin (C. albifrons). Genetic analysis by Jean Boubli in 2012 revealed that the Río Cesar white-fronted capuchin is actually more closely related to the Colombian white-faced capuchin (C. capucinus) than it is to C. albifrons. Some authors regard it to be a subspecies of the varied white-fronted capuchin (C. versicolor cesarae).

The Río Cesar white-fronted capuchin lives in dry semi-deciduous forest, gallery forest and mangroves. Its fur is light colored. Males have a head and body length between 30.8 and 40.7 cm (12.1 and 16.0 in) with a tail length of between 41.9 and 49.5 cm (16.5 and 19.5 in). Females have a head and body length between 35.3 and 38.5 cm (13.9 and 15.2 in) with a tail length of between 46.1 and 50 cm (18.1 and 19.7 in).
