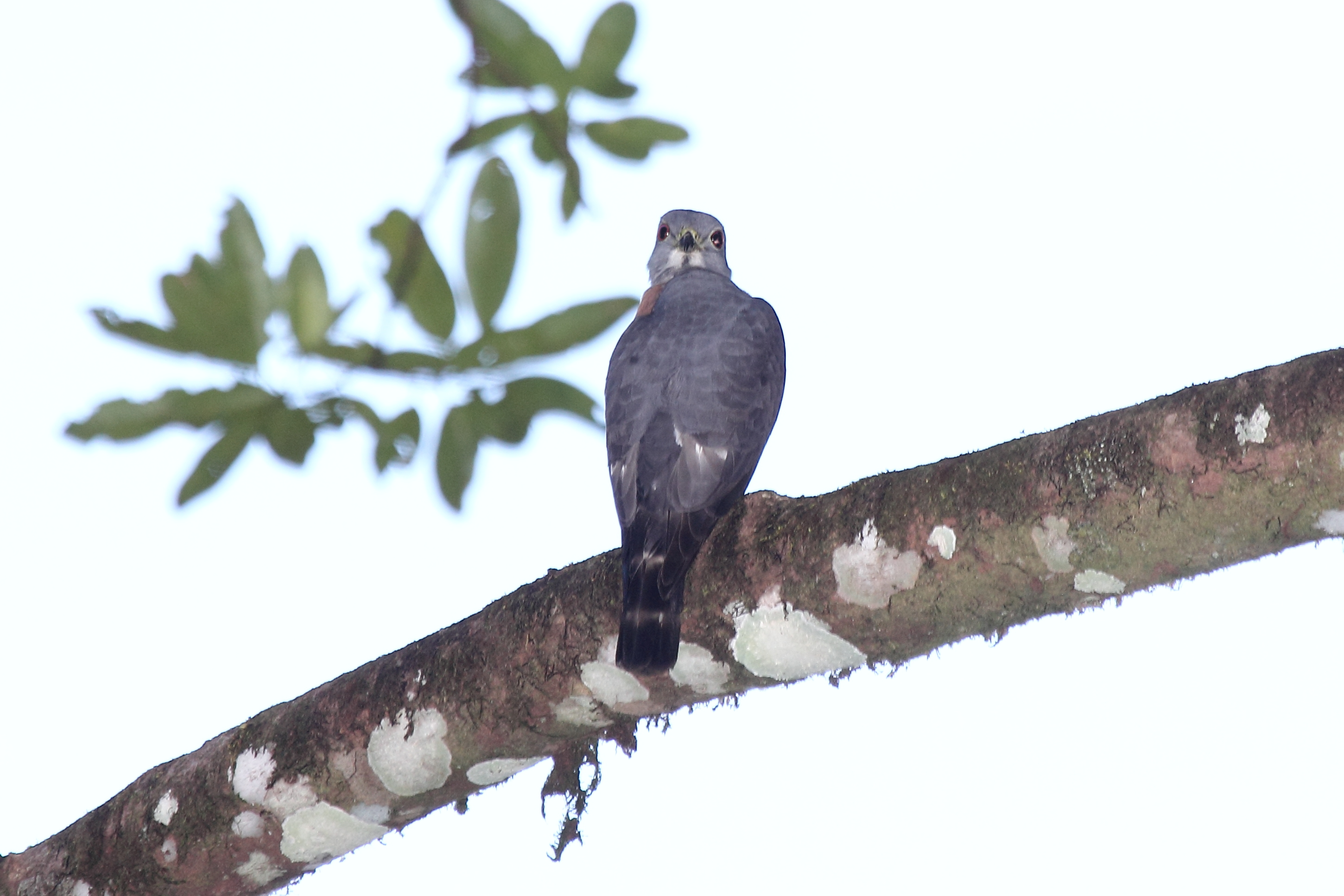
- Double-toothed kite (Harpagus bidentatus)

Scientific classification
- Kingdom: Animalia
- Phylum: Chordata
- Class: Aves
- Order: Accipitriformes
- Family: Accipitridae
- Subfamily: Harpaginae
- Genus: Harpagus; Vigors, 1824

Type species
- Falco bidentatus Latham, 1790

Species
- H. bidentatus H. diodon

= Harpagus (bird) =

Genus of birds

Harpagus is a genus of birds of prey in the family Accipitridae. It comprises:

Genus Harpagus – Vigors, 1824 – two species
Common name	Scientific name and subspecies	Range	Size and ecology	IUCN status and estimated population
Double-toothed kite	Harpagus bidentatus (Latham, 1790) Two subspecies: H. b. fasciatus – Lawrence, 1869; H. b. bidentatus – (Latham, 1790)	Belize, Bolivia, Brazil, Colombia, Costa Rica, Ecuador, El Salvador, French Guiana, Guatemala, Guyana, Honduras, Mexico, Nicaragua, Panama, Peru, Suriname, Trinidad and Tobago, and Venezuela	Size: Habitat: Diet:	LC
Rufous-thighed kite	Harpagus diodon (Temminck, 1823)	Brazil, Paraguay and eastern Bolivia; winters north to the Amazon basin and the Guyana Shield	Size: Habitat: Diet:	LC

Both live in tropical American forest. They are small, rather accipiter-like kites, 30 to 35 cm long and compact, with long tails and oval wings ("pinched in" near the base of the trailing edge) which they characteristically curve downward when soaring or gliding. Both have dark tails with pale bars, as well as a white throat with a dark stripe down the middle. Another shared feature is a blunt bill with two notches on each side of the upper mandible. This "double tooth" gave rise not only to the common name of one species but to the specific epithets bidentatus and diodon. Both like rather high perches in trees and sometimes soar above the forest.

Harpagus was the Greek name of a Median general.
