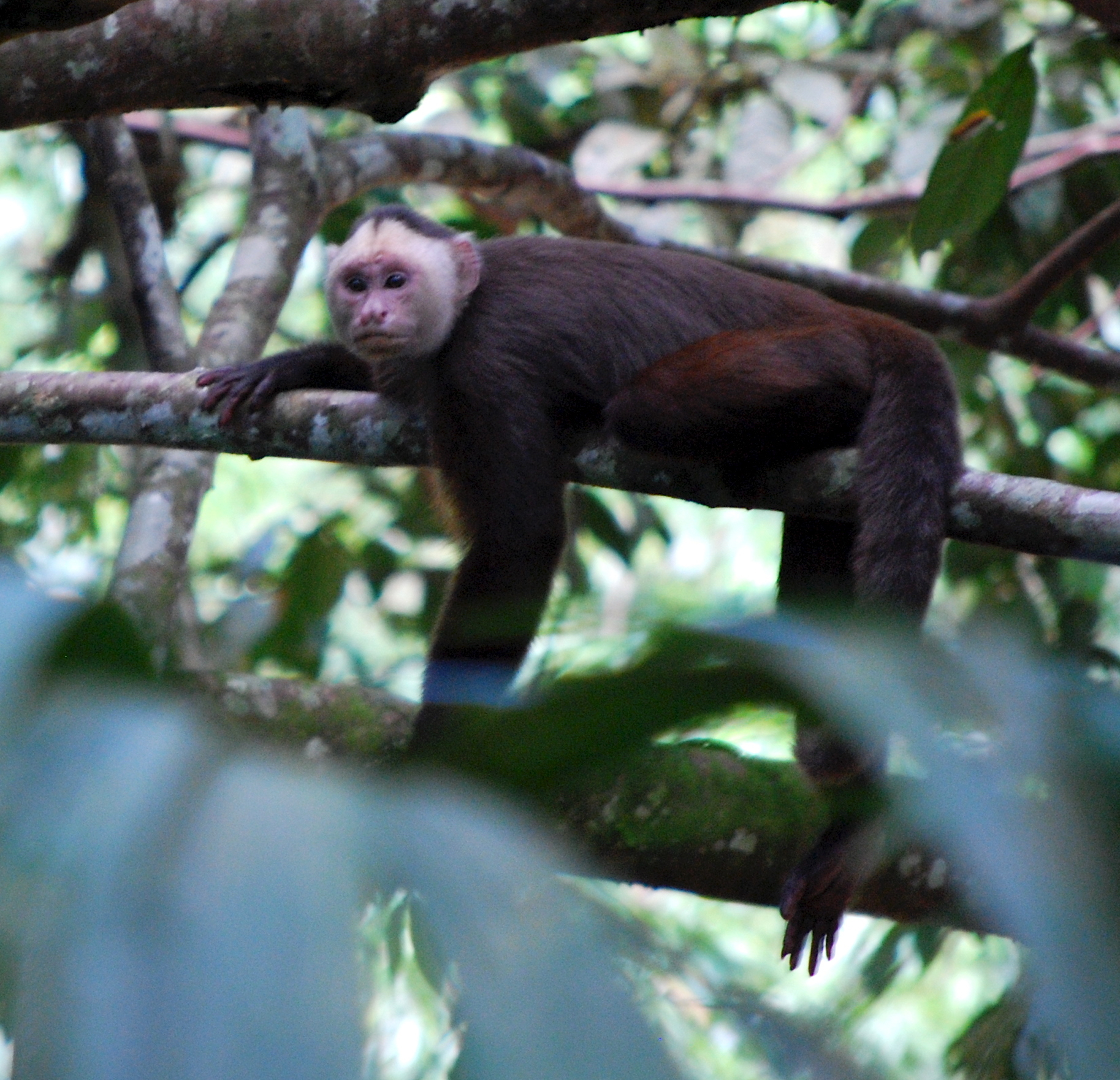

Conservation status
- Endangered (IUCN 3.1)

Scientific classification
- Kingdom: Animalia
- Phylum: Chordata
- Class: Mammalia
- Infraclass: Placentalia
- Order: Primates
- Family: Cebidae
- Genus: Cebus
- Species: C. versicolor

Binomial name
- Cebus versicolor (Pucheran, 1845)

= Varied white-fronted capuchin =

Species of New World monkey

The varied white-fronted capuchin (Cebus versicolor) is a species of gracile capuchin monkey from Colombia. It had been classified as a subspecies of the white-fronted capuchin (C. albifrons) Genetic analysis by Jean Boubli in 2012 revealed it to be a separate species. Some authors regard the Río Cesar white-fronted capuchin to be a subspecies of the varied white-fronted capuchin.

The varied white-fronted capuchin lives in lowland moist forest and in palm swamps in the Río Magdalena Valley of northern Colombia. It has reddish fur on its back, forearms and the front of its legs, contrasting with lighter fur overall. It has a dark brown crown on its head contrasting with light fur on the temples, forehead, chin, throat and on the sides of its face and neck. It has a head and body length between 45 and 50.5 cm (17.7 and 19.9 in) with a tail length of between 42 and 45.5 mm (1.65 and 1.79 in).
