= El Tuparro National Natural Park =

Parque Nacional Natural El Tuparro
- El Tuparro National Natural Park
- IUCN category II (national park)
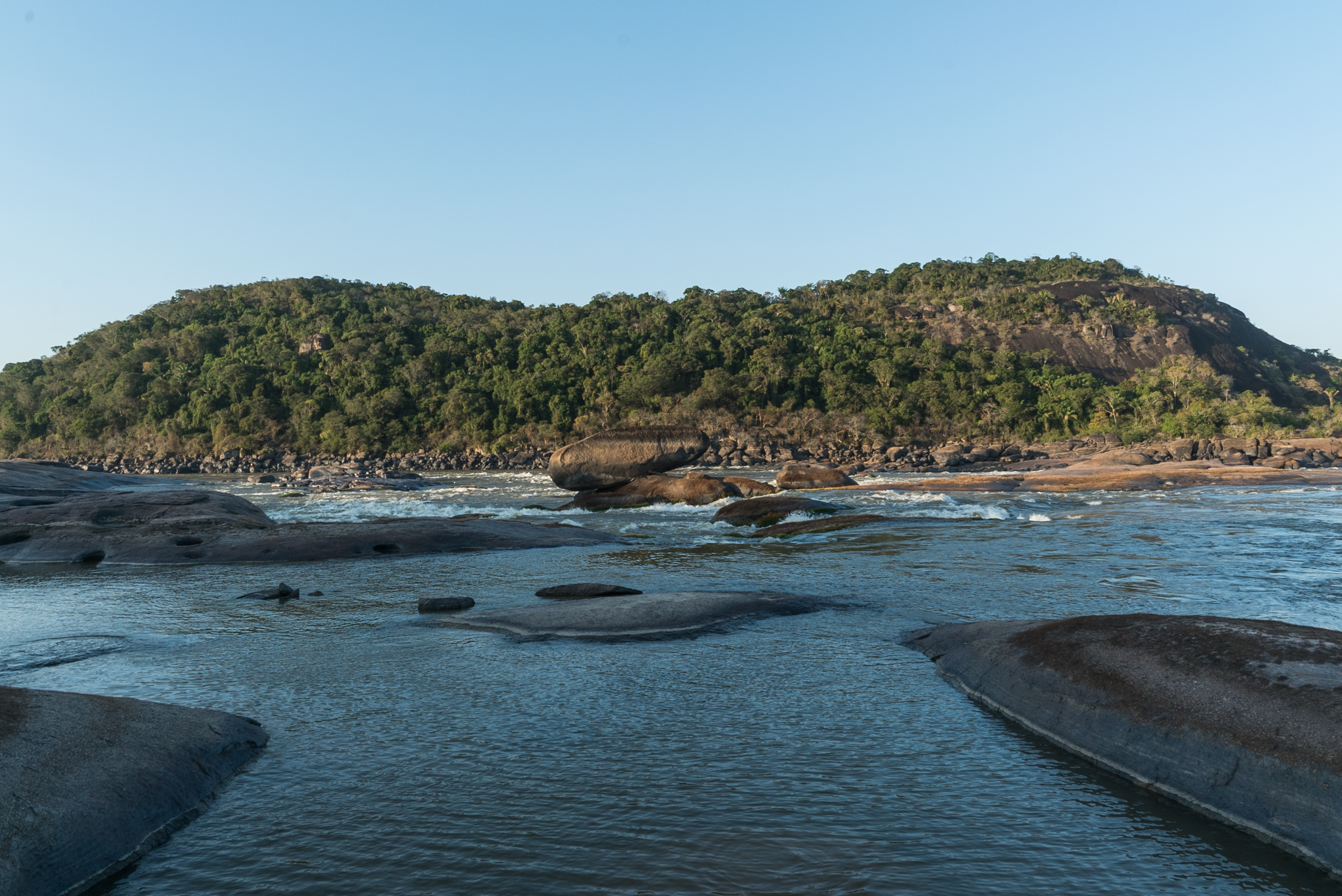
- The Maipures Rapids in El Tuparro

- Location within Colombia
- Nearest city: Puerto Carreño, Colombia
- Coordinates: 5°17′N 68°4′W
- Area: 5,480 km^{2} (2,120 sq mi)
- Established: 1970
- Governing body: SINAP

El Tuparro National Natural Park (Spanish: Parque Nacional Natural El Tuparro) is a national park located in the Vichada Department in the Orinoquía Region of Colombia. It is the only protected area in the Eastern Plains (Llanos Orientales) under Colombia's Natural Parks System.

One of its main attractions is the mighty stream Raudal de Maypures (Maipures Rapids), called the "Eighth Wonder of the World" by German explorer Alexander von Humboldt in the 19th century.

== Geography ==
The flat area is bounded by the Orinoco River to the east, the Tomo River to the north and the Tuparro River to the south. It was created in 1970 and covers an area of 548,000 hectares. In addition to the park's two broad types of natural ecosystems, flooded and non-flooded savannas, it also has five types of riparian forests.

Average yearly rainfall is 2477 mm in the western region and 2939 mm in the eastern. Average temperature is 27 °C. Savannas cover 75% of the area, and gallery forests covering the rest. Predominating plants include the Moriche Palm and the tree Caraipa llanorum. The dominant vegetation on the non-flooded savannas is grass.

The park is home to 74 species of mammals, 320 birds (many of them marine), 17 reptiles, 26 fish and five primate species. Amphibians are significantly diverse due to the variety of ecosystems in the area. Notable birds include guans, curassows, screamers, eagles and ducks. Mammals found on the savanna include white-tailed deer, giant armadillo, small savanna armadillo, and tapir. Peccaries, pumas, jaguars inhabit the woodlands.
