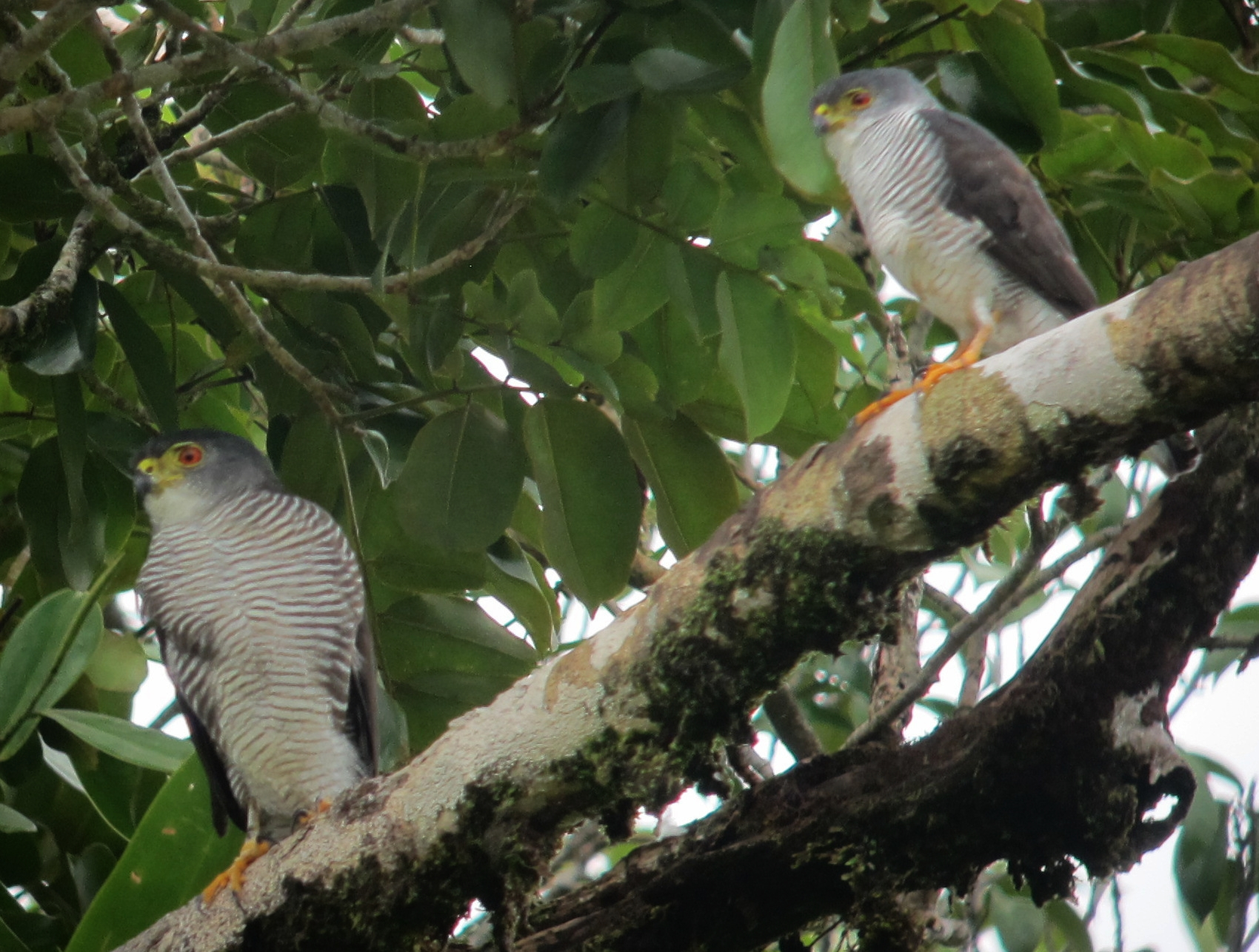
- Tiny hawk (M. superciliosus)

Scientific classification
- Kingdom: Animalia
- Phylum: Chordata
- Class: Aves
- Order: Accipitriformes
- Family: Accipitridae
- Subfamily: Harpaginae
- Genus: Microspizias; Sangster, Kirwan, Fuchs, Dickinson, Elliott, A & Gregory, S, 2021

Species
- Microspizias superciliosus; Microspizias collaris

= Microspizias =

Genus of birds

Microspizias is a genus of bird of prey in the family Accipitridae. It contains the following species:

- Tiny hawk (Microspizias superciliosus)
- Semicollared hawk (Microspizias collaris)

Both species were formerly classified in the genus Accipiter, but a 2021 report, based on earlier research which found them to be strongly phylogenetically distinct, described a new genus (Microspizias) for them. This was also followed by the International Ornithological Congress and the American Ornithological Society.

== Etymology ==
Microspizias derives from the Greek word micros ("small") and spizias ("hawk"), literally translating to "small hawk".

== Taxonomy ==
Phylogenetic evidence indicates that Microspizias is the sister genus to the lizard buzzard (Kaupifalco monogrammicus) of Africa and falls outside the Accipitrinae subfamily, hence why both species were moved out of Accipiter. It belongs to the subfamily Harpaginae.
