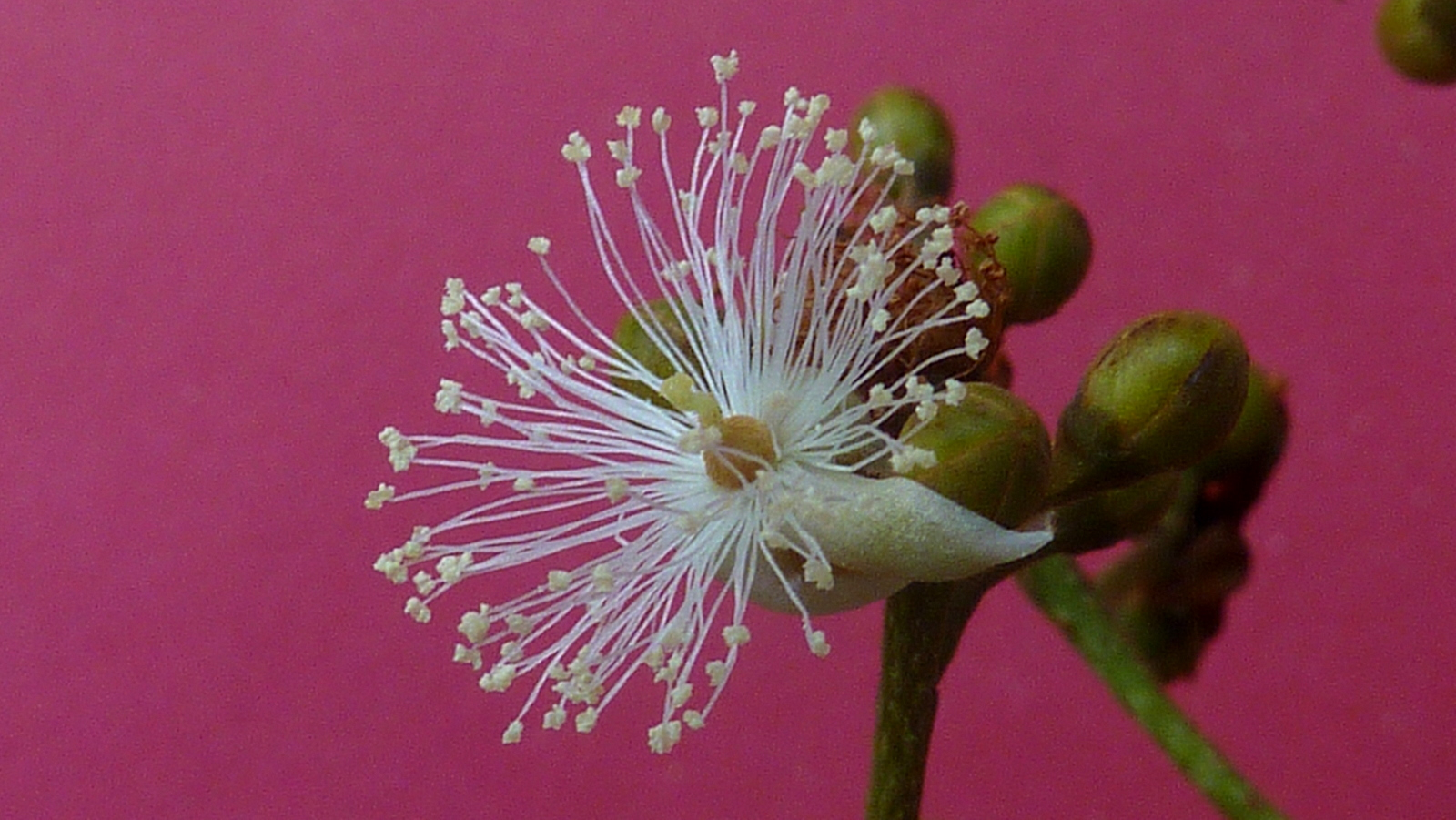
- Caraipa densifolia

Scientific classification
- Kingdom: Plantae
- Clade: Embryophytes
- Clade: Tracheophytes
- Clade: Spermatophytes
- Clade: Angiosperms
- Clade: Eudicots
- Clade: Rosids
- Order: Malpighiales
- Family: Calophyllaceae
- Genus: Caraipa; Aubl.

Species, see text
- 42; see text

= Caraipa =

Genus of flowering plants

Caraipa is a genus of flowering plants in the family Calophyllaceae. It includes 42 species native to tropical South America.

== Species ==
42 species are accepted.

- Caraipa acutata F.N.Cabral
- Caraipa ampla Ducke
- Caraipa andina Aymard & L.M.Campb.
- Caraipa antioquensis F.N.Cabral
- Caraipa aracaensis Kubitzki
- Caraipa balbinensis F.N.Cabral
- Caraipa caespitosa F.N.Cabral
- Caraipa cordifolia F.N.Cabral
- Caraipa costata Spruce ex Benth.
- Caraipa davilae F.N.Cabral
- Caraipa densifolia Mart.
- Caraipa duckeana Kubitzki
- Caraipa foveolata Huber
- Caraipa glabra F.N.Cabral
- Caraipa grandifolia Mart.
- Caraipa heterocarpa Ducke
- Caraipa iracemensis F.N.Cabral
- Caraipa jaramilloi R.Vásquez
- Caraipa kubitzkii F.N.Cabral
- Caraipa llanorum Cuatrec.
- Caraipa longipedicellata Steyerm.
- Caraipa longisepala Kubitzki
- Caraipa macrocarpa F.N.Cabral
- Caraipa minor Huber
- Caraipa multinervia Kubitzki
- Caraipa myrcioides Ducke
- Caraipa nigrolineata F.N.Cabral
- Caraipa odorata Ducke
- Caraipa parvielliptica Cuatrec.
- Caraipa parvifolia Aubl.
- Caraipa pilosa J.R.Grande & F.N.Cabral
- Caraipa psilocarpa Kubitzki
- Caraipa punctulata Ducke
- Caraipa racemosa Cambess.
- Caraipa richardiana Cambess.
- Caraipa rodriguesii Paula
- Caraipa savannarum Kubitzki
- Caraipa tereticaulis Tul.
- Caraipa tumescens F.N.Cabral
- Caraipa utilis R.Vásquez
- Caraipa valioi Paula
- Caraipa yutajensis F.N.Cabral
