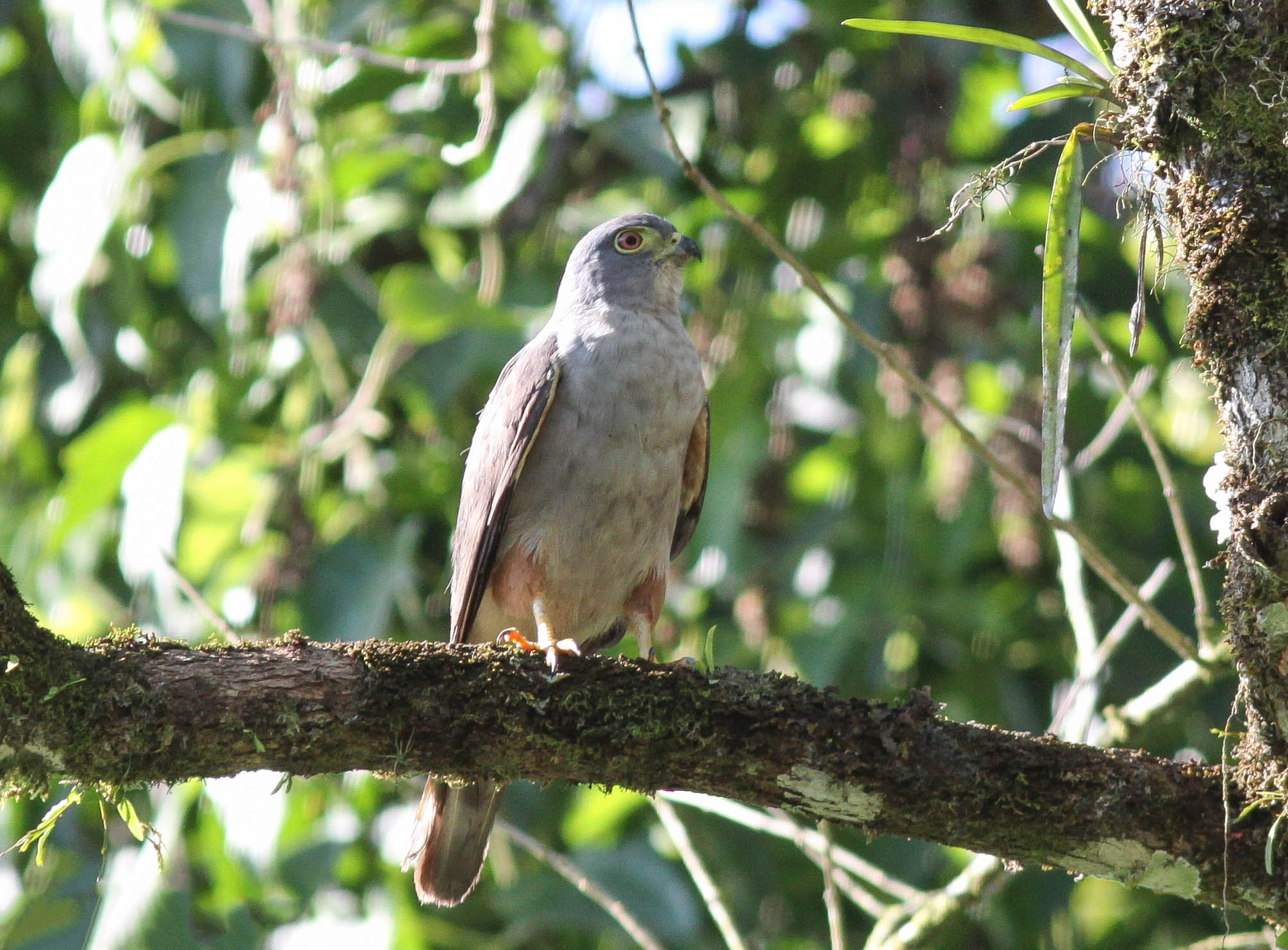

Conservation status
- Least Concern (IUCN 3.1)

Scientific classification
- Kingdom: Animalia
- Phylum: Chordata
- Class: Aves
- Order: Accipitriformes
- Family: Accipitridae
- Genus: Harpagus
- Species: H. diodon

Binomial name
- Harpagus diodon (Temminck, 1823)
- Nonbreeding Passage Breeding

= Rufous-thighed kite =

Species of bird

The rufous-thighed kite (Harpagus diodon) is a species of bird of prey in subfamily Accipitrinae, the "true" hawks, of family Accipitridae. It is found regularly in Argentina, Bolivia, Brazil, Guyana, Paraguay, and Suriname and as a vagrant in Colombia, French Guiana, and Venezuela.

== Taxonomy and systematics ==
Despite its English name, the rufous-thighed kite is not closely related to most other kites but to the "true" hawks. It shares its genus with the double-toothed kite (H. bidentatus) and is monotypic.

== Description ==
The rufous-thighed kite is 29 to 35 cm (11 to 14 in) long with a wingspan of 60 to 70 cm (24 to 28 in). The sexes are almost alike though the female is slightly larger than the male. Chestnut thighs give the species its English name. Adults have a slate gray head and upperparts. Their tail is slate gray with three paler gray bars and white tips to the feathers. Their throat is whitish with a dark streak down its center. Their breast is gray that becomes white at the undertail coverts. Their eye is red or orange, their cere lemon yellow, and their legs yellow to orange. Immature birds have dark brown upperparts with streaks on the side of the head; they are whitish below with some darker streaking on the breast and belly and barring on the flanks.

== Distribution and habitat ==
The rufous-thighed kite breeds in southern Brazil, northern Argentina, and Paraguay. In the non-breeding season it is regularly found further north in Amazonian Brazil, Bolivia, Guyana, and Suriname. The South American Classification Committee of the American Ornithological Society (SACC) has documented records of vagrancy to French Guiana and Venezuela but has not evaluated a report from Colombia. The SACC also classes the species as hypothetical in Ecuador on the basis of an undocumented sight record.

The rufous-thighed kite primarily inhabits lowland rainforest. It favors primary forest but can be found in secondary forest that has aged enough to have a closed canopy. It has been found in both dense and more open forests and even once in a forest patch within the city of São Paulo, Brazil.

== Behavior ==
=== Migration ===
The rufous-thighed kite is an austral migrant, moving north from its southerly breeding areas into Amazonia. It has been observed migrating in loose flocks of up to 30 individuals. The knowledge of its migration continues to expand.

=== Feeding ===
The rufous-thighed kite hunts within the forest, usually in the middle to upper layers of the canopy. It hunts from a perch and usually seizes its prey from branches rather than in mid-air. Its diet appears to be mostly insects such as cicadas and orthoptera with lesser numbers of small lizards, birds, amphibians, and mammals. It has been observed following army ant swarms and at least once a troop of monkeys to capture prey flushed by them.

=== Breeding ===
The rufous-thighed kite's breeding season is October to February, the austral late spring and summer. Its nest is a platform of small sticks placed in a tree fork or on a horizontal branch. The clutch size is one or two eggs. The incubation period is not known; fledging occurs about four weeks after hatch.

=== Vocalization ===
A fledgling and a parent on the nest gave "high-pitched 'chee' and disyllabic 'chee-weet' begging calls" when the other parent approached with prey. "Adults also give a three-note vocalization."

== Status ==
The IUCN has assessed the rufous-thighed kite as being of Least Concern. It has a very large range, but its population size is not known and believed to be decreasing. No immediate threats have been identified. It is a breeding endemic in the Atlantic Forest, a biome that has been almost completed destroyed. "Improved knowledge of its breeding range and biology suggests that this species may now be of conservation concern."
