= Chongon Colonche Range =

Mountain range in Ecuador

The Chongon Colonche Range (Spanish: Cordillera Chongón Colonche) or Colonche Range is a mountain range on the central Pacific coast of Ecuador. It stretches from Manabí Province in the northwest, curving southeast towards Guayaquil. The range peaks at over 800 metres above sea level and together with the Mache Chindul Range is the only major mountain range in Ecuador west of the Andes.

Much of the range is clad in indigenous tropical wet forest, although large areas have been cleared for agriculture. The remaining forest has high levels of biodiversity, and a protected area in the southeast is classified as an "Important Bird Area" by BirdLife International.
