= Tuparro River =

Location
- Country: Colombia

Tuparro River is a river of Colombia found in Vichada Department. It gives its name to El Tuparro National Natural Park. Tuparro is part of the Orinoco River basin.

== See also ==
- List of rivers of Colombia
