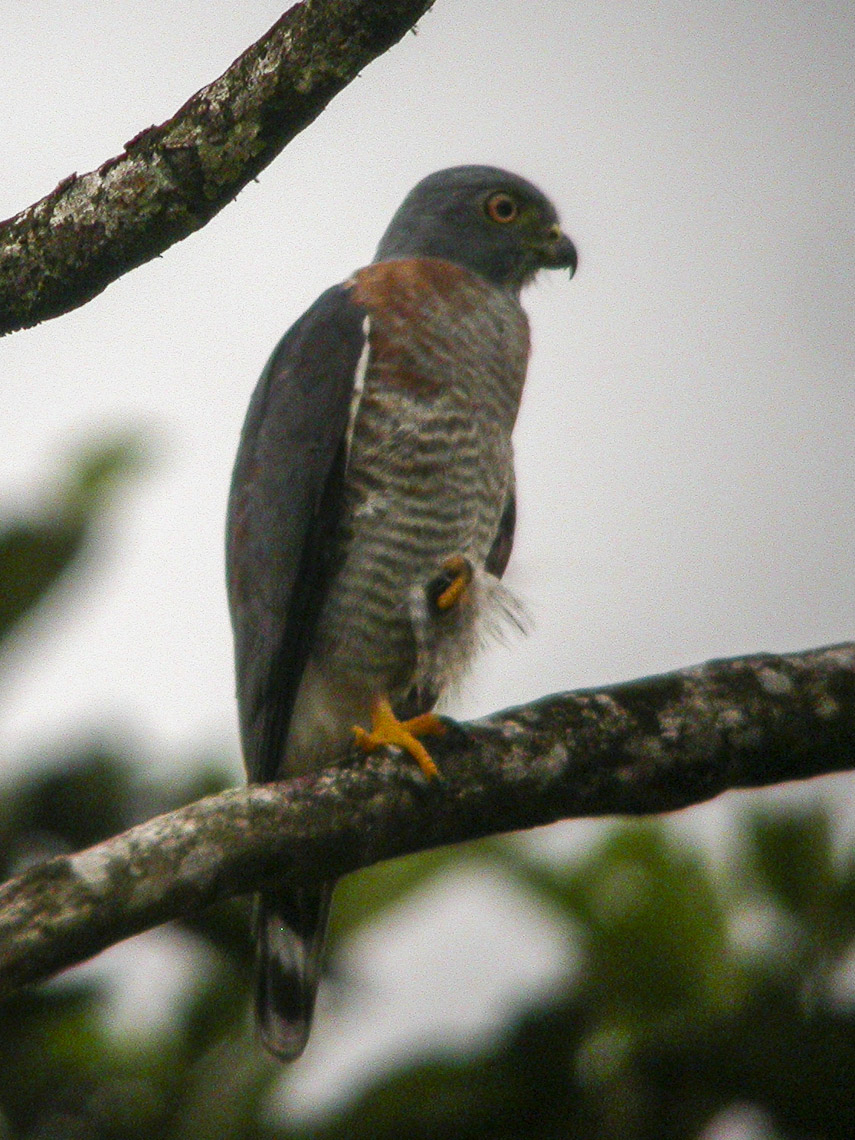

Conservation status
- Least Concern (IUCN 3.1)

Scientific classification
- Kingdom: Animalia
- Phylum: Chordata
- Class: Aves
- Order: Accipitriformes
- Family: Accipitridae
- Genus: Harpagus
- Species: H. bidentatus

Binomial name
- Harpagus bidentatus (Latham, 1790)

Subspecies
- H. b. fasciatus – Lawrence, 1869; H. b. bidentatus – (Latham, 1790)

= Double-toothed kite =

Species of bird

The double-toothed kite (Harpagus bidentatus) is a species of bird of prey in subfamily Accipitrinae, the "true" hawks, of family Accipitridae. It is found from central Mexico through Central America into much of northern and eastern South America.

== Taxonomy and systematics ==
Despite its English name, the double-toothed kite is not closely related to most other kites but to the "true" hawks. It shares its genus with the rufous-thighed kite (H. didion). It has two subspecies, the nominate H. b. bidentatus and H. b. fasciatus.

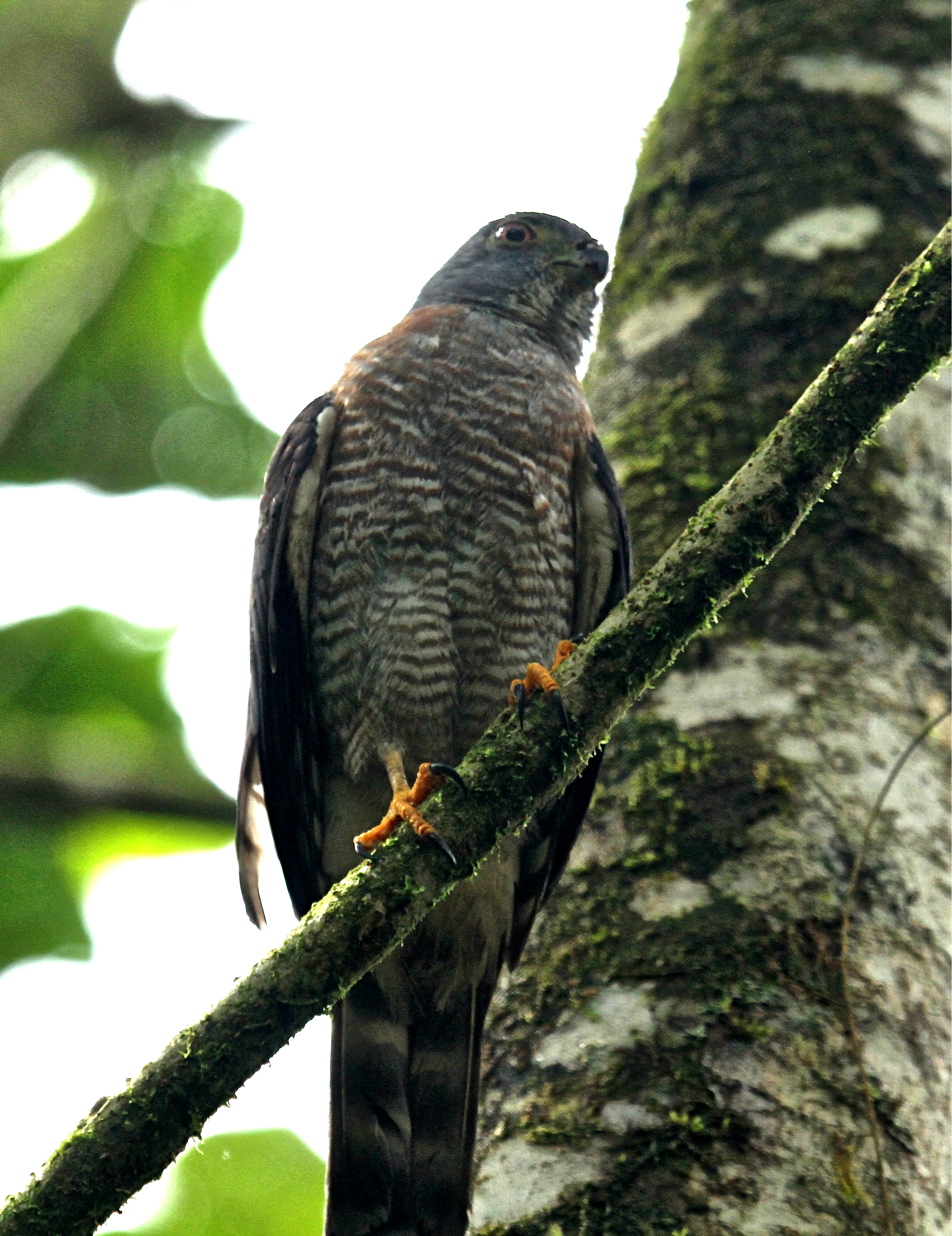
H. b. fasciatus
Silanche Reserve, western Ecuador

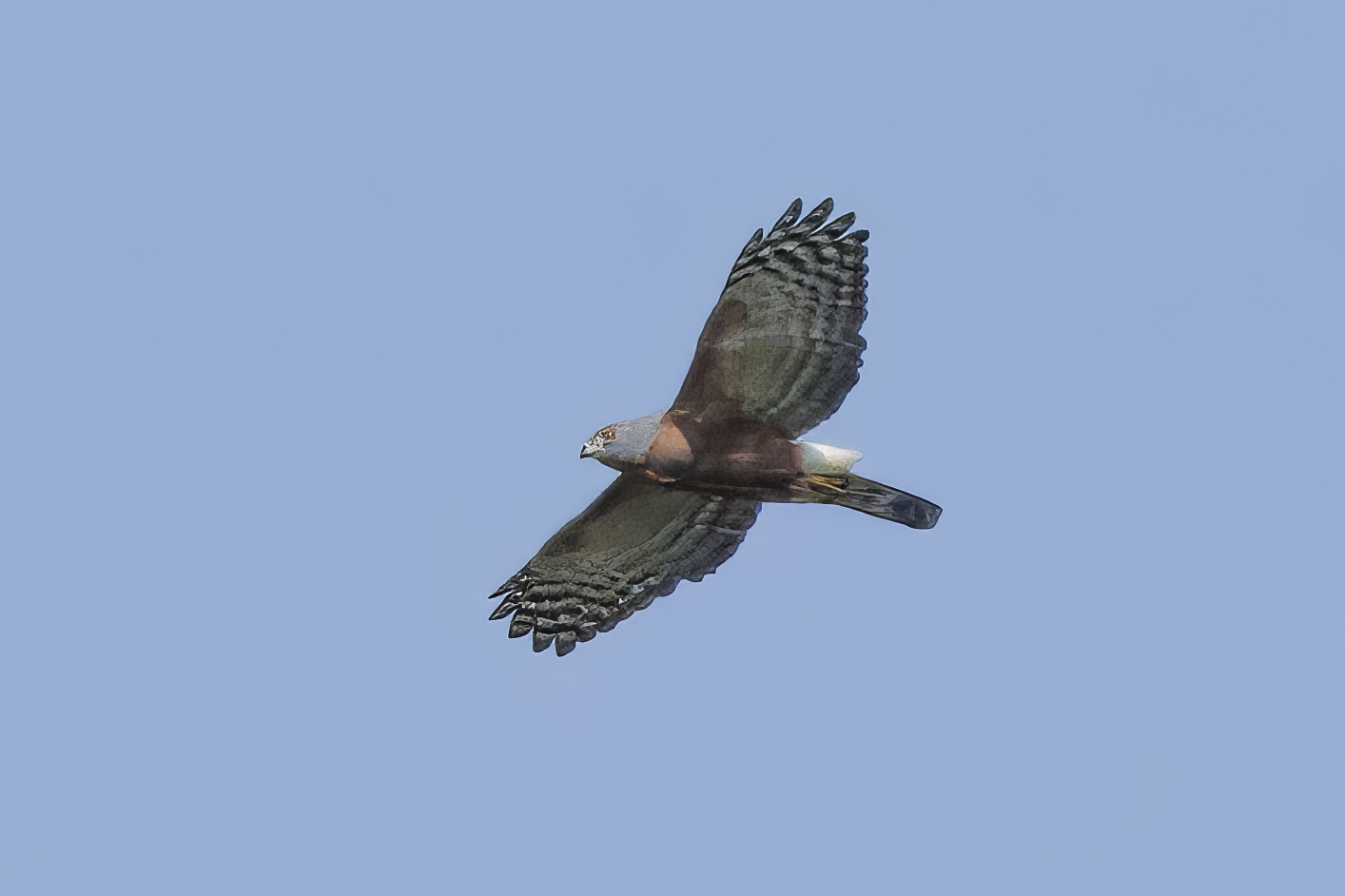
H. b. bidentatus
Sucumbios, eastern Ecuador

== Description ==
The double-toothed kite is 29 to 35 cm (11 to 14 in) long with a wingspan of 60 to 72 cm (24 to 28 in). Males weigh about 160 to 200 g (5.6 to 7.1 oz) and females about 190 to 230 g (6.7 to 8.1 oz). The species gets its English name from the tooth-like notches on the edge of its maxilla. Males and females have similar plumage though the females' colors are richer. Adults of both subspecies have a dark gray head with a white throat that has a dark stripe down its center. Their upperparts are a somewhat lighter gray and their tail blackish with three grayish bands and a gray tip. Their eyes are red, their cere greenish yellow, and their legs and feet yellow. The nominate subspecies has a rufous breast, a rufous belly with gray and whitish barring that sometimes extends into the lower breast, and white undertail coverts. Adults of subspecies H. b. fasciatus have similar underparts to the nominate but the rufous is paler and less extensive and the barring heavier and more extensive. Immatures of both subspecies have deep brown upperparts and whitish to buff underparts with bold vertical brown streaks.

== Distribution and habitat ==
The nominate subspecies of double-toothed kite has the more southerly range of the two. It is found on Trinidad and from eastern Colombia east through Venezuela and the Guianas and south and east into Amazonian Ecuador, Peru, Bolivia, and Brazil. A separate population is found in southeastern Brazil. Subspecies H. b. fasciatus is found from Jalisco and southern Veracruz in Mexico through the Caribbean slopes of Guatemala, Belize, and Honduras and both slopes of Nicaragua, Costa Rica, and Panama into western Colombia and western Ecuador. One individual has been documented as a vagrant in Texas.

The double-toothed kite primarily inhabits the interior of mature subtropical and tropical forest. It occurs less frequently at forest edges and clearings, young secondary forest, scrubby woodland, and disturbed forest. In elevation it ranges from sea level to at least 1,200 m (3,900 ft) in Costa Rica, about 1,200 m (3,900 ft) in Colombia, and 2,100 m (6,900 ft) in Ecuador.

== Behavior ==
=== Movement ===
The double-toothed kite is essentially sedentary, though at least one has wandered as far as Texas.

=== Feeding ===
The double-toothed kite primarily hunts from a perch in the forest interior. It dives to take prey; in one study about 2/3 of the captures were directly from vegetation, most of the rest in flight, and a small percentage from the ground. Its prey includes insects (such as butterflies, cicadas, grasshoppers, katydids, crickets, beetles, wasps, caterpillars, and cockroaches) and small vertebrates (mostly anoles and geckos but also iguanas, bats, birds, rodents, and snakes). Insects dominate in numbers but vertebrates in biomass. It regularly follows close behind troops of monkeys to catch prey flushed by them.

=== Breeding ===
The double-toothed kite's breeding season varies widely over its very large range but appears to generally be in the local spring and early summer. The species makes courtship display flights above the canopy; males also feed females during courtship and incubation. Females make a saucer nest of small twigs in a tree fork as high as 33 m (110 ft) above the ground, sometimes with help from the male. Nests are often at the edge of the forest. The typical clutch size is two eggs, which the female almost exclusively incubates. The incubation period is 42 to 45 days and fledging usually occurs 27 to 31 days after hatch. Young are independent by about two months after fledging.

=== Vocalization ===
The double-toothed kite makes high-pitched calls "'tsip-tsip-tsip-tsip-wheeeeeoooip', extended 'wheeeeoooo' or 'cheeeeee-it'" in nest defence or other agonistic encounters. Pairs make contact calls described as "whistled 'see-weeeeep' or 'chee-weet'". Young beg with a "chee-weet" call.

== Status ==
The IUCN has assessed the double-toothed kite as being of Least Concern. It has an extremely large range and an estimated population of at least a half million mature individuals. No immediate threats have been identified. It is "[r]elatively common in appropriate habitat" but "will not persist in areas of extensive deforestation."
