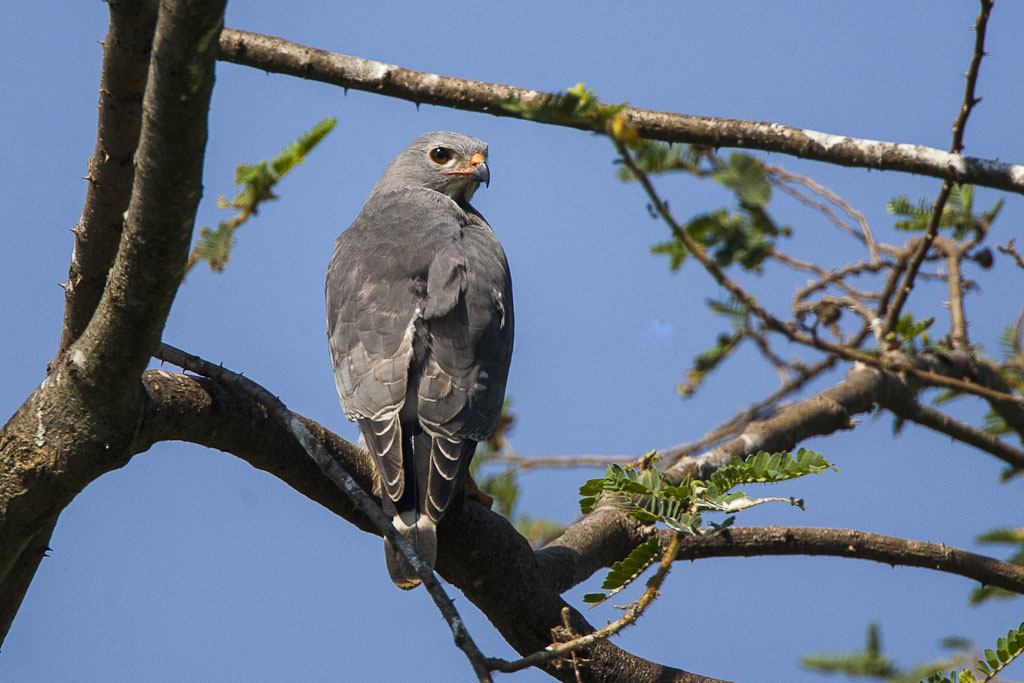

Conservation status
- Least Concern (IUCN 3.1)

Scientific classification
- Kingdom: Animalia
- Phylum: Chordata
- Class: Aves
- Order: Accipitriformes
- Family: Accipitridae
- Subfamily: Accipitrinae
- Genus: Kaupifalco; Bonaparte, 1854
- Species: K. monogrammicus

Binomial name
- Kaupifalco monogrammicus (Temminck, 1824)

Subspecies
- Kaupifalco monogrammicus monogrammicus - (Temminck, 1824); Kaupifalco monogrammicus meridionalis - (Hartlaub, 1860)

Audio
- Calls recorded in Kitale, Kenya

= Lizard buzzard =

Species of bird

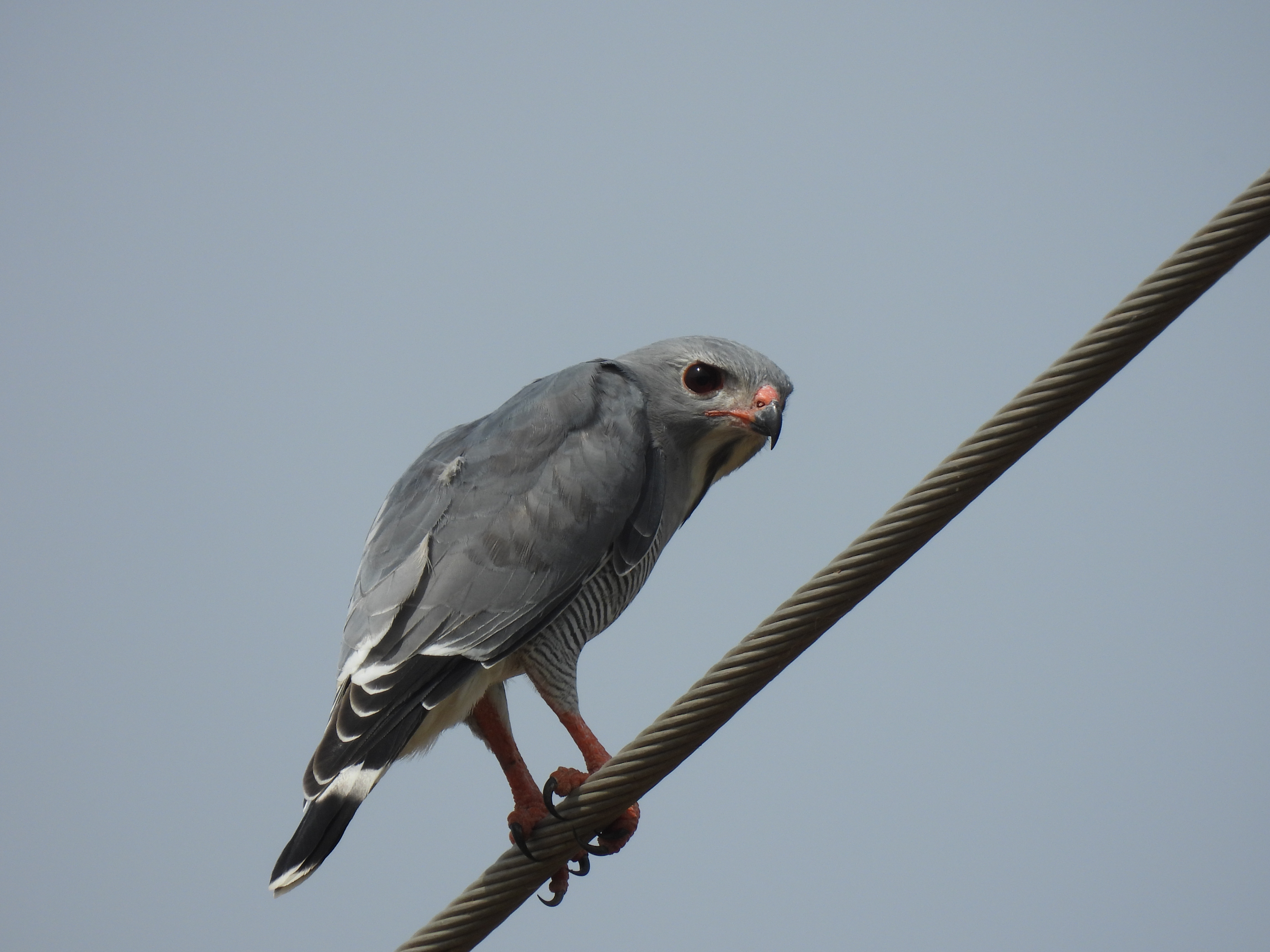
Kaupifalco monogrammicus in The Gambia, December 2021

The lizard buzzard (Kaupifalco monogrammicus), or lizard hawk, is a bird of prey in the family Accipitridae. It is the only species placed in the genus Kaupifalco. It is native to Sub-Saharan Africa. Despite its name, it may be more closely related to the Accipiter hawks than the Buteo buzzards.

== Taxonomy ==
Molecular phylogenetic studies have revealed that the lizard buzzard is not closely related to Buteo buzzards but rather to Accipiter hawks. This extends to morphological associations, e.g. the lizard buzzard has pointed and fairly short wings. Despite the lizard buzzard inhabiting Africa, phylogenetic evidence indicates that its closest relatives are the two Microspizias hawks of Central and South America.

== Description ==
The lizard buzzard is a smallish stocky raptor with a total body length of 35–37 cm and a wingspan of about 79 cm. Males weigh 246 g, females 304 g on average. The upperparts, head and breast are grey. There is a vertical black line on the white throat, which distinguishes this species from all other raptors. The belly is white with fine dark barring. The underwings are white with dark tips. The tail is black with a white tip and a single white band. The eyes are dark reddish brown to black. The cere and legs are red to orange red. Sexes are similar. The flight pattern is undulating like a thrush. The juvenile lizard buzzard resembles the adult; the only variations are slight brown tinge to the wings with an orange yellow cere and legs.

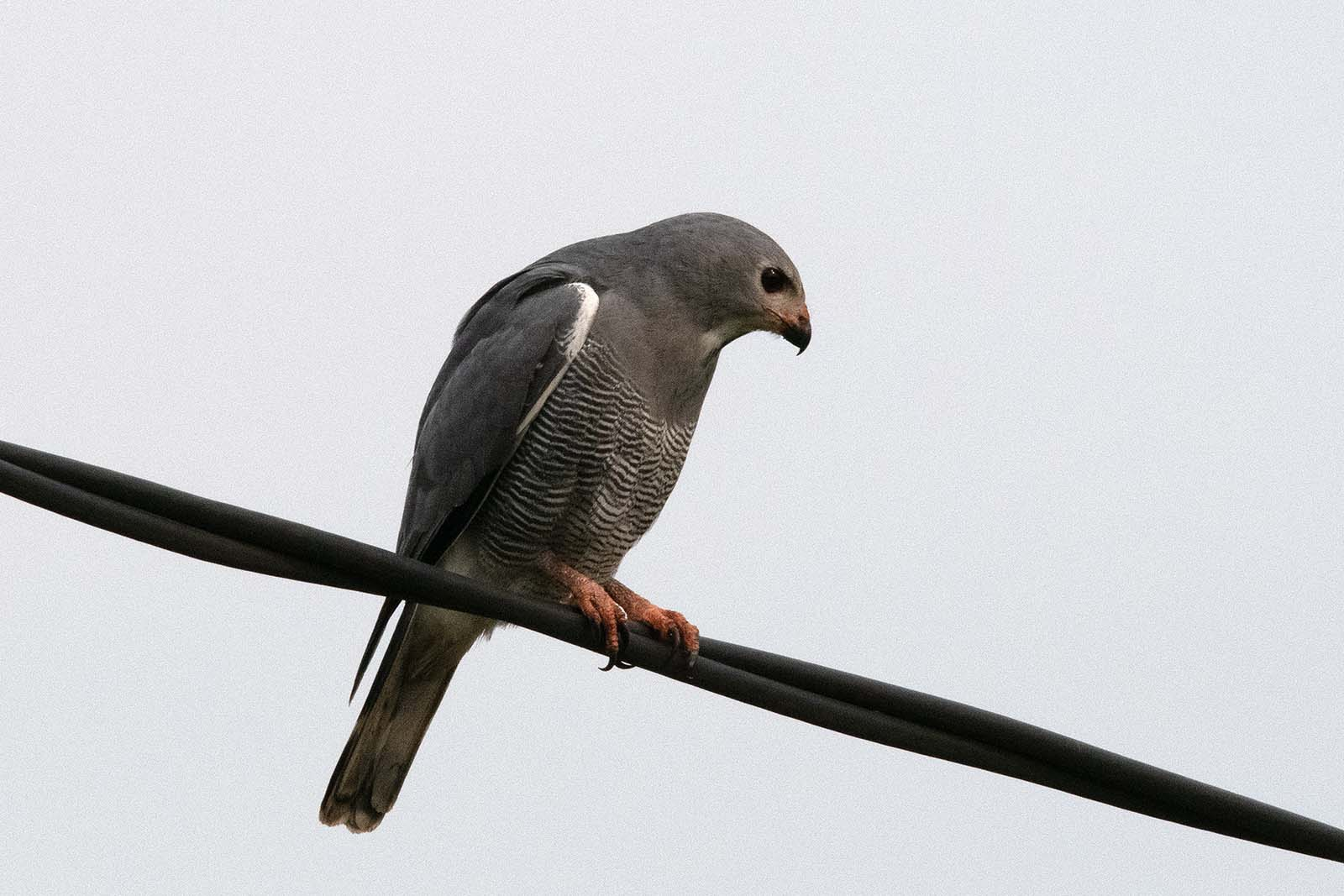
K. monogrammicus in Uganda

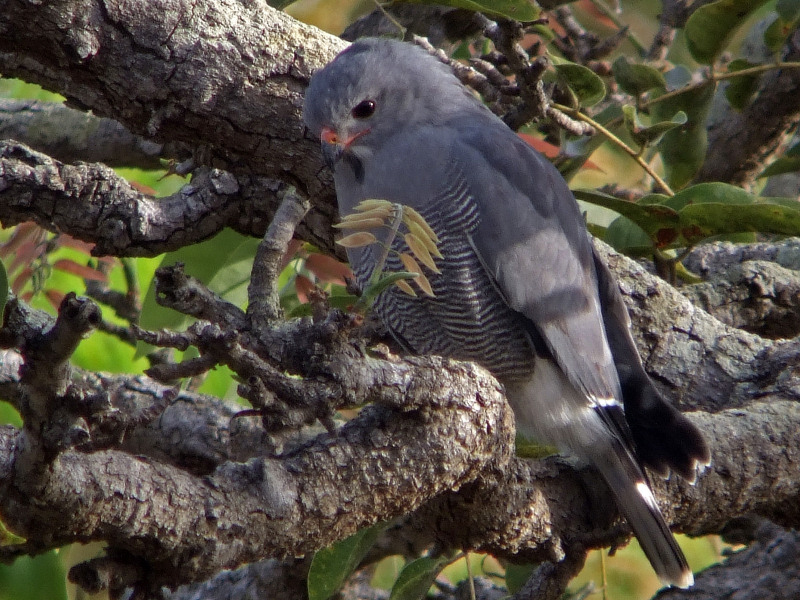
K. monogrammicus in Saloum Delta National Park in Senegal

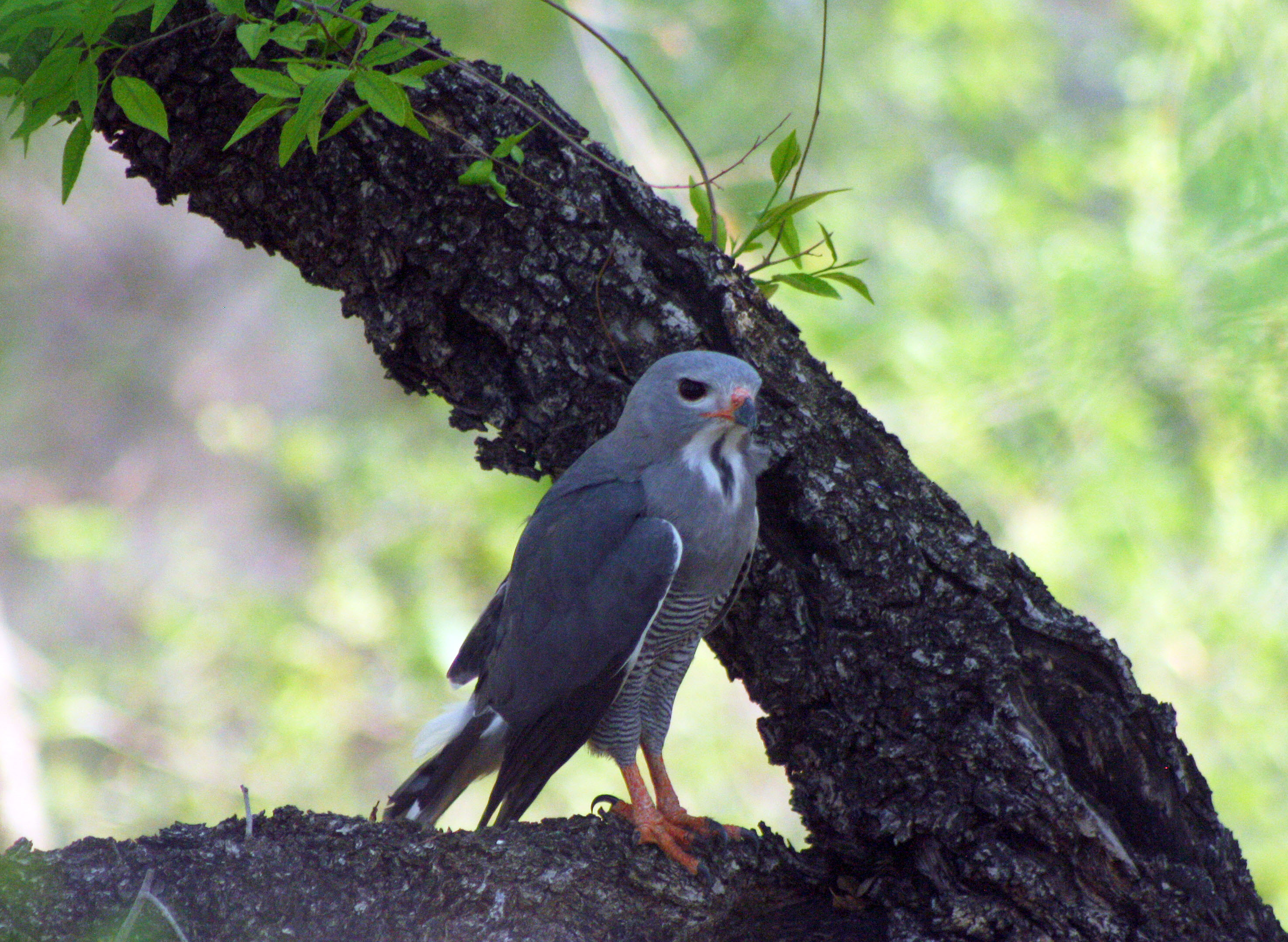

== Distribution and habitat ==
The lizard buzzard occurs in Sub-Saharan Africa from Eritrea to north eastern South Africa. It remains common in West Africa, Zimbabwe, Mozambique and north eastern areas of Namibia, Botswana and South Africa. Its preferred habitat is moist dense savannah woodland especially miombo woodland, forest edges and wooded margins of rivers. It is also found, especially in winter, in arid thornbush in savannah areas of East and Central Africa.

== Ecology ==
Lizard buzzards are solitary and silent raptors, except for early in breeding season (September and October) when they produce a clear, distinct and melodious whistle klu-klu-klu. They remain locally resident and are dominant over intruders. There is very limited soaring flight, which only occurs during courtship displays or on rare non-breeding occasions in the late morning.

Lizard buzzards hunt from perches, 6–10 m in height, and catch prey by swooping or gliding onto prey in the grass. They have a low attack rate, passively searching for prey which is energetically inexpensive but time-consuming. They rarely catch prey in flight. They have shorter pointed wings (ratio of wing length to body height 0.76) resulting in a more rapid flight in forests which suggests an adaptation to prey capture in dense vegetation. Their diet consists of invertebrates, reptiles and mammals. By number most common prey are grasshoppers and termites, while by biomass rodents are the most frequent. Reptiles favoured are lizards especially Mabuya and Agama lizards, frogs and snakes.

=== Breeding ===
Breeding occurs during the months of September to November. Lizard buzzards are monogamous and form pair bonds that are protected or permanent. Both sexes are involved in nest building which is small and compact, composed of sticks and found in the sub canopy of trees both indigenous and alien, often near the main trunk of the tree. The stick nest is lined with dry grass, green leaves or lichen.

Like some other raptors, lizard buzzards are alternative nest users. Although they prefer to build nests in the subcanopy, when they occupy an existing nest this can occur in the canopy above. Lizard buzzards will also compete with Shikras for available nests, since these have a similar size, habitat preference and distribution.

The clutch size is 1–3 white eggs which are incubated by the female and take 32–34 days before hatching. During this time the male feeds the female and both feed the chicks for the next 40 days. Full independence of the chicks occurs at about 90 days.

== Conservation ==
The range of lizard buzzards is extremely large and does not approach the threshold for vulnerable under range distribution. The population trend appears to be stable and does not approach thresholds for vulnerable. The population size is extremely large and for these reasons is evaluated as least concern. However, in Africa particularly West and Southern Africa there have been recorded dramatic declines in some raptors. The reasons for raptor decline in Africa are rapid human population growth driving overexploitation of the land causing biodiversity loss and a decreased species richness. The raptor population declines in West Africa have been linked to loss of woodland and nest sites, increased pesticide use, intensive cultivation especially cotton and disturbance of nests. In Southern Africa raptor decline has been linked to use of poisons, powerline electrocutions, habitat destruction and raptor drowning in farm reservoirs. Despite high human population and activity in Africa, not all raptor species have declined sharply. Some raptors, especially opportunistic generalists and migrants have increased. In West Africa the grasshopper buzzard, black kite and hooded vulture have increased in number and range. Similarly in the Western Cape of South Africa, the steppe buzzard, lesser kestrel and yellow-billed kite have increased range and number. Currently there is insufficient data on the Lizard Buzzard to determine its adaptation to human land usage. It is unclear how it has adapted to loss of Woodland its preferred habitat and nesting site. Its preferred prey insects, lizards and rodents remain common in most human altered landscapes which could account for its current survival.
