= Econ =

Econ usually refers to economics, a social science that analyzes the production, distribution, and consumption of goods and services.

Econ may also refer to:

- Committee on Economic and Monetary Affairs (ECON), a committee of the European Parliament
- Econ Engineering, a UK manufacturer of winter and road maintenance vehicle bodies
- Econ group (Greece), a Greek conglomerate

== See also ==
- Economics (disambiguation)
