= Historical materialism =

Marxist theory of history and society

Diagram illustrating the theory of historical materialism

Historical materialism is a theory of history and sociology in Marxist thought that posits that material and economic conditions are the primary drivers of societal structure and historical change. First articulated by Karl Marx and Friedrich Engels in the mid-19th century, the theory proposes that the mode of production of material life—the way a society produces and reproduces the means of human existence—determines or conditions its political, legal, and ideological "superstructure". Historical development is understood as a succession of modes of production, with transitions between them driven by contradictions that arise between the developing forces of production (technology, labour power) and the static relations of production (class structure, property ownership).

The materialist conception of history was developed by Marx as a critical response to German idealist philosophy, the ahistorical materialism of the Enlightenment, and the classical political economy of thinkers like Adam Smith and David Ricardo. In what is considered its definitive formulation, from his 1859 preface to A Contribution to the Critique of Political Economy, Marx summarized the theory's guiding principle: "It is not the consciousness of men that determines their existence, but their social existence that determines their consciousness." Marx and Engels first sketched the theory in The German Ideology (1845–46), conceptualizing history as a series of "progressive epochs"—the Asiatic, ancient, feudal, and modern bourgeois (capitalist) modes of production. Rather than a complete and established scientific theory, Marx and Engels presented these ideas as a set of methodological principles and hypotheses to serve as a "guiding thread" for historical and social research.

Following Marx's death, Engels expanded on these ideas in works such as Anti-Dühring (1878) and The Origin of the Family, Private Property and the State (1884). According to some scholars, Engels's later formulations shifted the theory's emphasis from a critical-philosophical method to a positivist and deterministic science, presenting historical materialism as a specific application of a universal "dialectical materialism" that governed both nature and society. This interpretation became a cornerstone of Marxism–Leninism and Soviet orthodoxy, although it diverged from Marx's own approach, which was primarily concerned with the analysis of societal development, particularly the rise of capitalism from within European feudalism.

As a framework for analysis, historical materialism treats class conflict as the central mechanism of historical change, with social revolutions occurring when the existing relations of production begin to fetter the development of productive forces. While the theory has been criticized for its purported economic determinism, and many of its core tenets have been subject to radical revision, its concepts have had a profound influence on sociology, historiography, and critical theory.

== Origins and development ==
Historical materialism was formulated by Karl Marx as a radical break with the prevailing philosophical and historical traditions of his time, synthesizing elements from German idealism, French socialist thought, and British political economy. His aim was to move beyond a purely empirical or a purely speculative account of history toward a "critical theory" that revealed the internal logic of societal development as a necessary, law-governed process.

In doing so, Marx built upon the work of earlier thinkers like William Petty, Adam Smith, and David Ricardo, whose labor theory of value contributed to the "economic anatomy of classes", and from the French historians of the Bourbon Restoration—such as Augustin Thierry, François Mignet, and François Guizot—who had identified class struggle as the motive force of historical revolutions. He also drew inspiration from French socialist thinkers like Henri de Saint-Simon, who saw history as a progression of social systems, each with its own internal logic and eventual obsolescence, and who emphasized the primacy of production and economic organization in shaping society.

The concept of history as a succession of "modes of subsistence" can be traced back to the Scottish Enlightenment. Thinkers such as Smith, Adam Ferguson, John Millar, and William Robertson developed a "four-stage theory" of history, which posited that society progressed through stages of hunting, pastoralism, agriculture, and commerce. This model explained the development of property, law, and government as a consequence of changes in how a society provided for its material existence. Marx's emphasis on the centrality of material production can thus be seen as the culmination of this tradition, rather than an entirely original contribution.

=== Hegelian and Feuerbachian roots ===
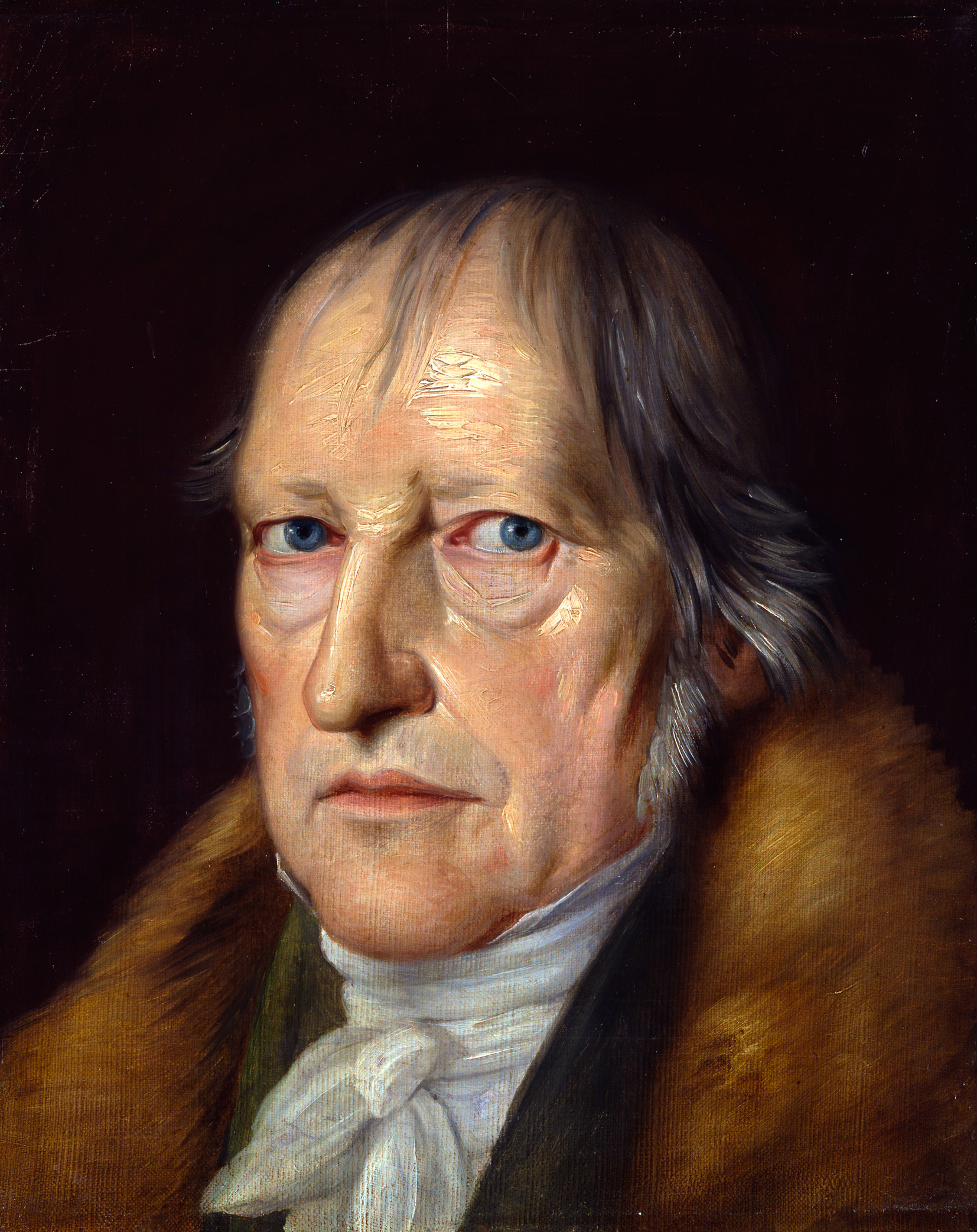
Georg Wilhelm Friedrich Hegel

Marx's theory of history was deeply shaped by his critical engagement with the philosophy of Georg Wilhelm Friedrich Hegel. While Marx rejected Hegel's idealism—the idea that history is the unfolding of a universal "Spirit" or "Idea"—he retained the Hegelian conviction that history is not a random collection of facts but a coherent, intelligible process with an internal logic. For Hegel, this process culminated in the "reconciliation of idea and reality" in the modern rational state; for Marx, it culminated in the revolutionary overthrow of that reality.

From Hegel, Marx adopted the dialectical method, but sought to apply it not to the movement of ideas but to the material, social world. He criticized Hegel for reifying abstract concepts and treating them as the real subjects of history, rather than starting from real, concrete human beings. Marx also took from Hegel the epistemological framework of the "philosophy of internal relations", the ontological view that any given entity is constituted by the sum of its internal relations to other entities that make up the whole. This relational conception posits that the "conditions of its existence are taken to be part of what it is", a view that stands in contrast to the common-sense atomistic or dualistic idea of things having "external" relations with one another. According to Marx, although he rejected Hegel's idealist theories, he never wavered from this relational conception.

Marx's "inversion" of Hegel was influenced by Ludwig Feuerbach, who argued that humans had projected their own essential attributes onto an external, abstract God, leading to religious alienation. Marx extended this critique to the social and economic sphere; however, he criticized Feuerbach's materialism as static and ahistorical, postulating an unchanging human essence that neglected the historical process and the practical, productive activity of human beings. Marx countered that human nature is not fixed but is continually transformed through practical social activity. In his Theses on Feuerbach (1845), Marx established his departure from all previous philosophy, asserting that "[t]he coincidence of the changing of circumstances and of human activity... can be conceived and rationally understood only as revolutionary practice." History, therefore, was the story of humanity's self-creation through labour.

=== Early formulations ===
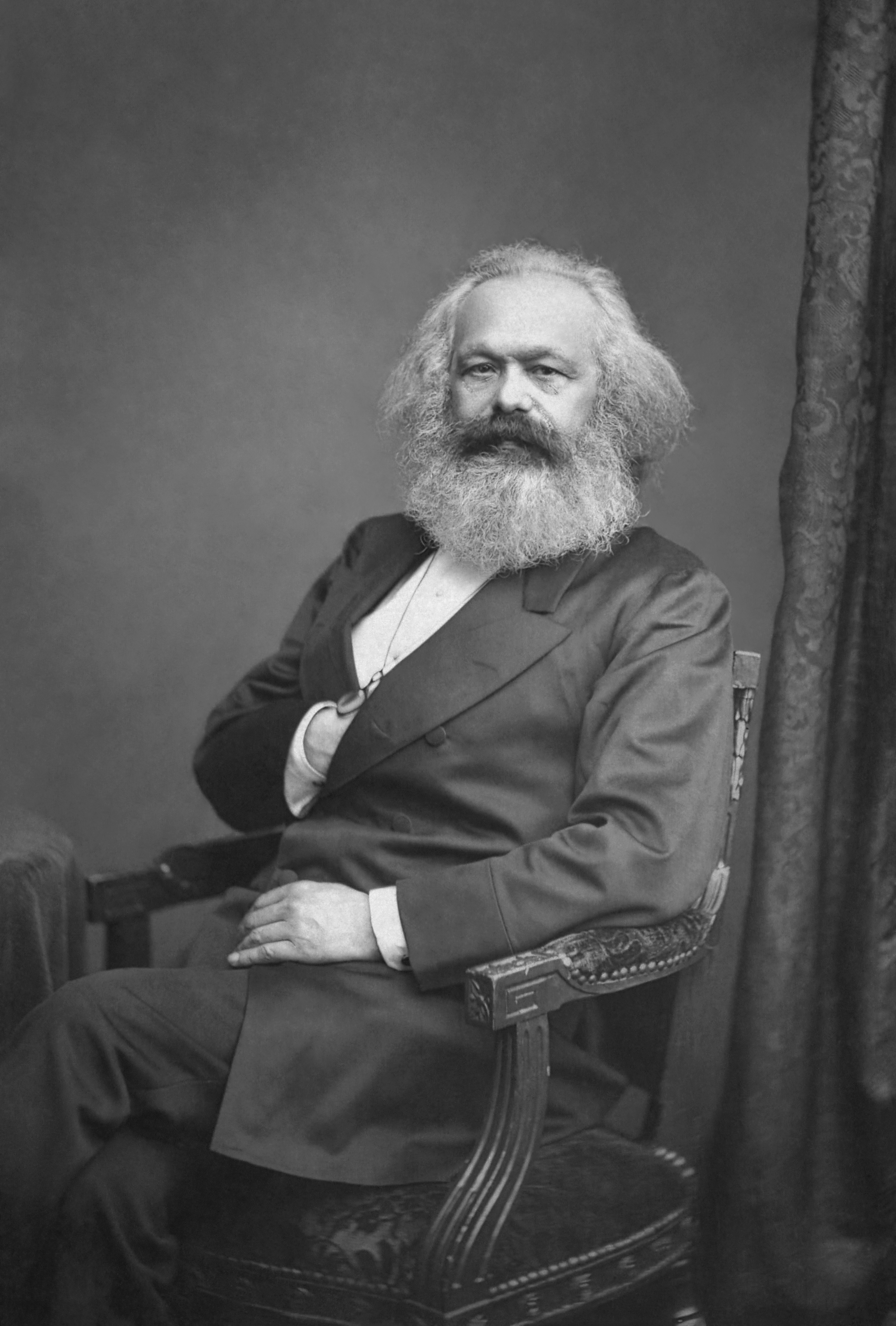
Karl Marx, who developed historical materialism as a framework for analyzing society and history

The first rudimentary sketch of historical materialism appears in The German Ideology, written by Marx and Friedrich Engels in 1845–46 but not published in their lifetimes. In it, they broke decisively with their Young Hegelian past and asserted that the starting point for any real understanding of history must be "the real process of production, starting out from the material production of life itself". The work contrasts the materialist approach with the idealism of German philosophy: "in contrast to German philosophy which descends from heaven to earth, here we ascend from earth to heaven." The starting point is not abstract ideas but real, historical individuals who "begin to distinguish themselves from animals as soon as they begin to produce their means of subsistence"—a step conditioned by their physical organization. The text outlines a sequence of historical stages, each characterized by a dominant form of property: tribal, ancient (communal and state property), and feudal.

A more developed version of the theory appeared in the extensive manuscripts Marx wrote in 1857–58, posthumously published as the Grundrisse. In these notes, Marx elaborated on the different "pre-capitalist formations", analyzing the internal dynamics of the "Asiatic", ancient, and Germanic (feudal) modes of production. This work laid the foundation for his mature economic studies by historicizing the categories of political economy and demonstrating that capitalism was a specific, transitory mode of production, not a natural and eternal condition.

The most famous and concise summary of the theory was provided by Marx in the preface to his 1859 book, A Contribution to the Critique of Political Economy. This text became the canonical statement of historical materialism, defining its core concepts and serving as the primary reference point for later Marxists. However, because it was written with an eye to bypassing Prussian censorship, it tends to downplay the active, revolutionary role of human agency. In it, Marx stated his "guiding principle":

In the social production of their life, men enter into definite relations that are indispensable and independent of their will, relations of production which correspond to a definite stage of development of their material productive forces. The sum total of these relations of production constitutes the economic structure of society, the real foundation, on which rises a legal and political superstructure and to which correspond definite forms of social consciousness... It is not the consciousness of men that determines their being, but, on the contrary, their social being that determines their consciousness.

The interpretation of this passage has been a source of considerable debate. Some scholars have read it as a statement of rigid economic determinism, a view described as the "fundamentalist" or "vulgar Marxist" interpretation. This reading suggests a one-way causal relationship where the economic base wholly determines the superstructure. Other scholars have argued for a non-reductive reading, pointing out that Marx's language allows for a more complex relationship. For instance, the original German bedingt is more plausibly translated as "conditions" rather than "determines", implying a partial and incomplete determination. Marx's wording, which also includes terms like "correspondence", leaves room for non-economic factors and reciprocal influence. Marx himself described these propositions not as a finished theory but as hypotheses that formed a "guiding thread" for his research. Engels, in a series of letters written after Marx's death, emphasized this point, complaining that "too many of the younger Germans simply make use of the phrase historical materialism (and everything can be turned into a phrase) only in order to get their own relatively scanty historical knowledge ... constructed into a neat system as quickly as possible."

== Key concepts ==
=== Productive forces and relations of production ===
The "material productive forces" (or "forces of production") include the means of production—instruments of labour (tools, machinery) and subjects of labour (raw materials)—and labour power, the human capacity to perform work. Human labour is defined by characteristics that make it exclusively human: unlike the instinctual work of animals, it involves a preconceived plan, the fabrication and use of tools, and articulate speech. According to the traditional interpretation of historical materialism, productive forces are "material" in that they are distinct from social relations. However, an alternative reading argues that for Marx, productive forces are not "things" but the collective powers of social labour. In this view, phenomena typically categorized as social relations or even superstructural elements—such as co-operation, division of labour, scientific knowledge, or forms of consciousness like a sense of liberty—can function as productive forces. To treat productive forces as purely material, separate from the social relations they embody, is to "fetishize" them, mistaking a specifically capitalist form of appearance for a universal reality.

The "relations of production" refer to the social relationships that people enter into to produce and exchange goods, which they become conscious of as property relations. Marx and Engels first outlined this distinction in The German Ideology, where the relations of production were termed "forms of intercourse"; the concept was more fully elaborated in Marx's The Poverty of Philosophy (1847). These relations are primarily determined by the form of ownership of the means of production and constitute the class structure of society as "economic relations of effective control; that is essentially exploitative relations between classes." Critiques of the traditional view argue that this definition is too narrow, particularly when applied to pre-capitalist societies. For Marx, the relations of production encompassed the totality of social relations required for a given mode of production; in feudalism, for instance, this included "direct relationship[s] of lordship and servitude", and in ancient societies, it included membership in the polis. In this broader sense, relations of production can include kinship, political, and ideological relations, not just property relations in the narrow "economic" sense.

According to Marx, history progresses through the development of the productive forces. At a certain stage, the existing relations of production, which once facilitated development, become "fetters" on the further development of the productive forces. This contradiction between the dynamic forces of production and the static relations of production creates a period of social crisis and revolution.

=== Base and superstructure ===
Diagram of one interpretation of the base and superstructure model

Marx conceptualized society as consisting of a material "base" and an ideological "superstructure". The base is the economic structure of society—the sum total of the relations of production. The superstructure comprises the legal and political institutions, as well as the religious, aesthetic, and philosophical forms of consciousness, that arise from this economic base.

The theory posits that the superstructure is ultimately determined by the nature of the economic base. As Marx wrote in the 1859 Preface, "With the change of the economic foundation the entire immense superstructure is more or less rapidly transformed." To avoid a mechanically deterministic interpretation of this relationship, Engels warned that the economic base is the "ultimately determining element in history", but that the various elements of the superstructure "also exercise their influence upon the course of the historical struggles and in many cases preponderate in determining their form". He stressed that there is an "interaction of all these elements" and that the superstructure enjoys a degree of "relative independence". The superstructure is not merely a passive reflection of the base; it is an "active force" that functions to "protect, fortify and develop its basis" and can, in turn, influence the course of economic development. The political state, for example, is seen as an instrument of the ruling class, designed to maintain the existing property relations.

Later interpretations have questioned the suitability of the base-superstructure metaphor as a literal description of any society. Marx himself cautioned against a simplistic reading of the metaphor in Capital, Volume III, stating that due to "innumerable different empirical circumstances", the same economic basis can show "infinite variations and gradations in appearance, which can be ascertained only by analysis of the empirically given conditions". Some scholars argue that Marx saw the relationship as one of 'organic totality', in which different social spheres—economic, political, legal, cultural—interpenetrate and mutually condition one another. They point out that Marx himself treated elements like science and law as interpenetrating both the base and superstructure, rather than being confined to the latter. For example, scientific knowledge is part of the cultural superstructure but also a direct productive force, while property law is a legal form but also an integral component of the relations of production. This view frames historical materialism not as a mechanical theory of one-way determination, but as a study of a society's hierarchical structure, in which the mode of production retains a primary but not exclusive determining role.

Other scholars argue that Marx never intended the metaphor as a theory of discrete, substantively defined "levels" of society. Instead, the superstructure is understood as the "ideal" or ideological forms of appearance (Erscheinungsformen) of the real relations that constitute the base. The apparent separation between the "economic" base and the "political" superstructure is itself an ideological form specific to capitalism, where impersonal market relations obscure the underlying class relations that the state and law help to constitute. In this view, the state is not an external "superstructure" but is "internal to capitalism's 'base' itself"—an essential, constitutive element of its class relations. The distinction between base and superstructure is an analytical one, not a distinction between separate sets of institutions; the "fusion" of economic and political power in pre-capitalist societies is a consequence of the reliance on extra-economic coercion for surplus extraction, and in no way contradicts the explanatory primacy of the forces and relations of production.

=== Modes of production and social formations ===
Historical materialism charts human history as a succession of "modes of production", each defined by its specific combination of productive forces and relations of production. In the 1859 Preface, Marx identified "the Asiatic, ancient, feudal, and modern bourgeois modes of production as progressive epochs in the economic formation of society". A distinction is often made between a mode of production as an abstract model and a social formation as a concrete historical society. A social formation typically involves a "specific overlapping of several 'pure' modes of production", with one being dominant.

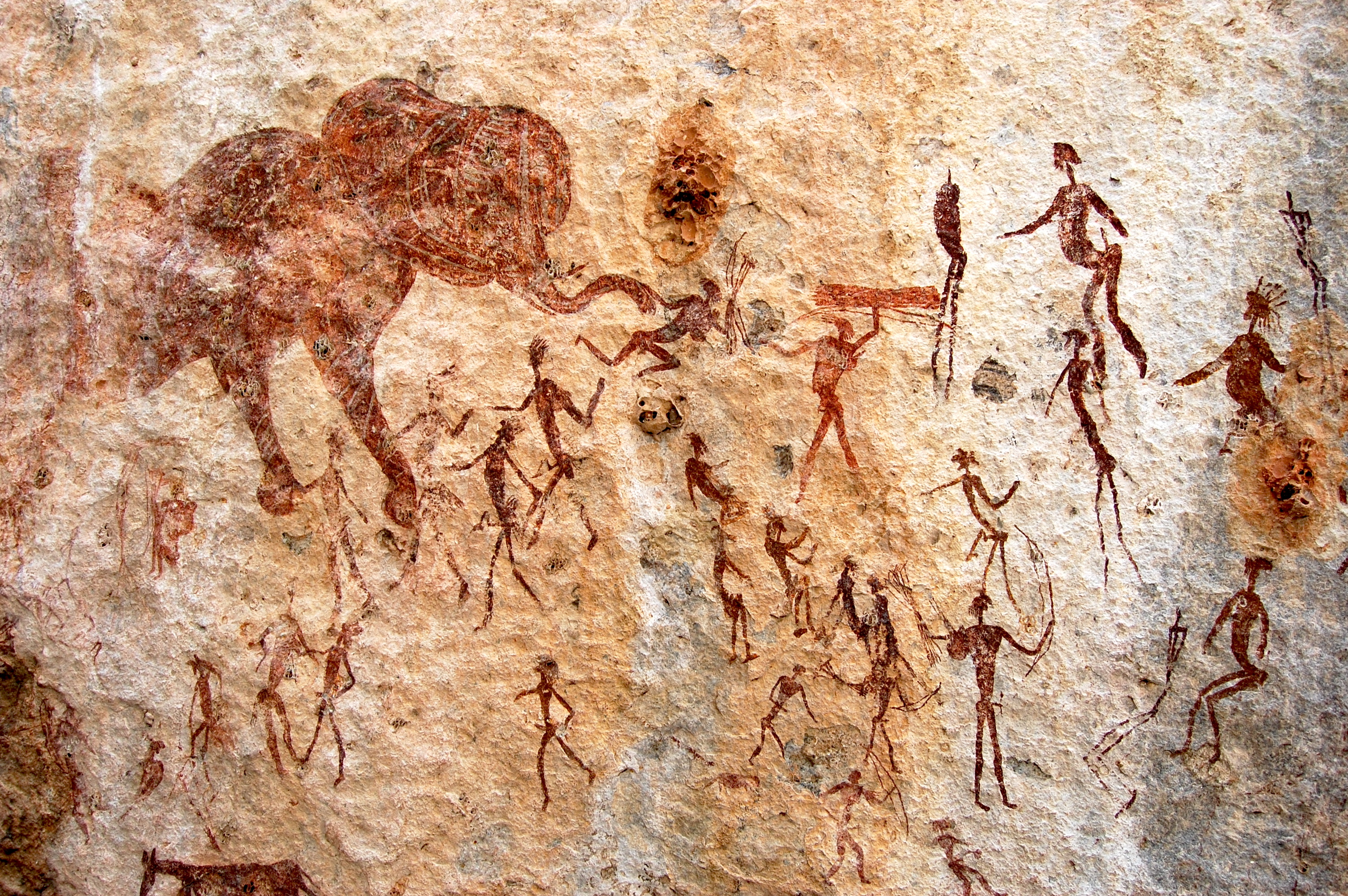
Prehistoric cave painting depicting hunting under primitive communism

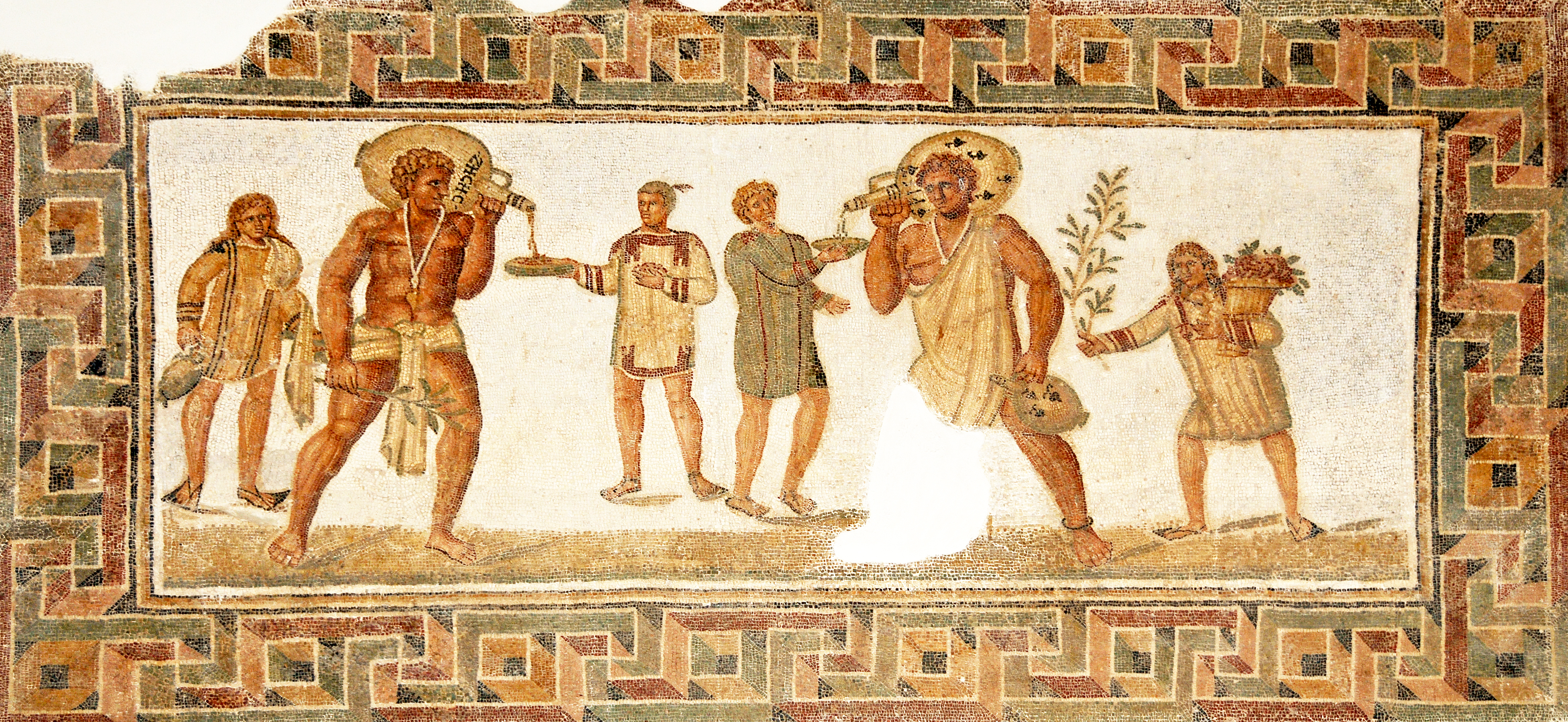
Roman mosaic depicting slavery under the ancient mode of production

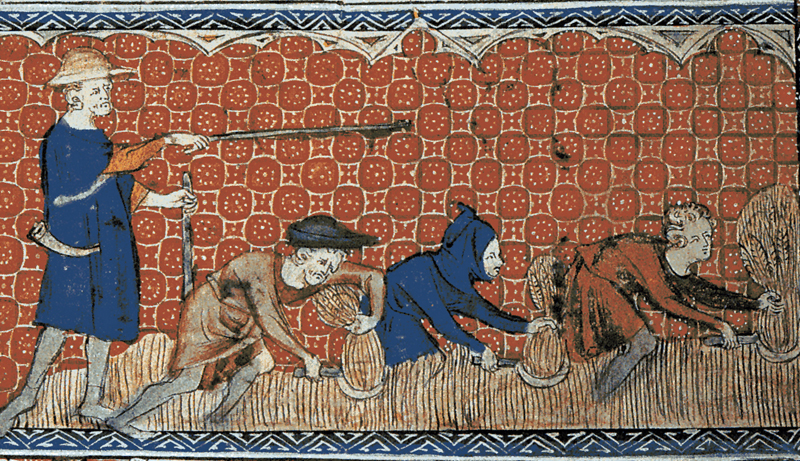
Medieval European art depicting serfdom under the feudal mode of production

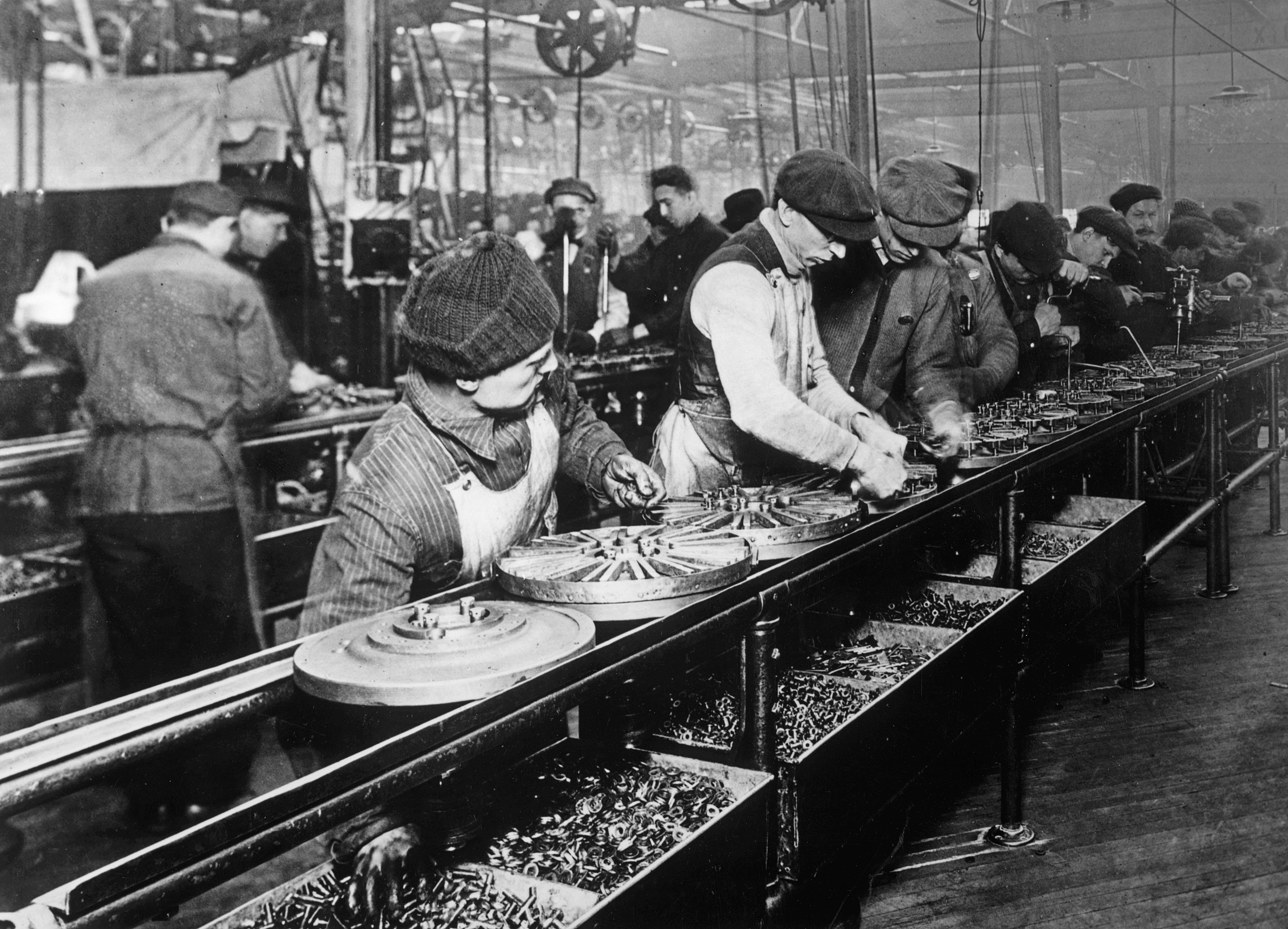
Workers on a factory assembly line under the capitalist mode of production

- Primitive communism, the earliest stage, was characterized by communal ownership and a hunter-gatherer economy. The transition from pre-class to class society occurred through two primary paths: the "Asiatic" path, which involved the rise of a bureaucratic elite to administer large-scale public works like irrigation, and the "ancient" path, which was based on the enslavement of prisoners of war and debtors.
- The Asiatic mode of production, which Marx studied in the context of India and China, was characterized by the absence of private property in land, with the state acting as the "supreme landlord". Society was composed of largely self-sufficient village communities that rendered surplus labour or tribute to the despotic state.
- Classical antiquity (the ancient mode of production) was based on the city-state, where citizens were landowners who held communal property (ager publicus) as a community and held power over a large population of slaves who performed the productive labour. This system contained its own "logic of decay," as military expansion, the growth of large estates (latifundia), and reliance on slave labour ultimately undermined the foundation of the small, independent, citizen-farmer.
- Feudalism in medieval Europe was based on a hierarchy of land ownership, with peasant serfs tied to the land and performing surplus labour for the landowning military aristocracy. Bourgeois society, according to Marx, began to develop in the "pores" of feudal society with the growth of medieval towns and artisan production.
- Capitalism (the modern bourgeois mode of production) arises from the dissolution of feudalism. It is defined by private ownership of the means of production and the existence of a class of free but propertyless wage-labourers (the proletariat), who must sell their labour power to the capitalist class (the bourgeoisie) in order to live.

Marx's list of modes of production was not intended to represent a unilinear path through history, as some peoples might "bypass whole formations". He protested against attempts to transform his "sketch of the origins of capitalism in Western Europe into a historical-philosophical theory of a universal movement necessarily imposed upon all people". His later research on the Russian peasant commune led him to believe that certain societies could bypass the capitalist stage and move directly to communal ownership under favorable international conditions, demonstrating his rejection of a rigid, deterministic historical schema.

=== Class struggle and revolution ===
The contradiction between the productive forces and the relations of production manifests itself as class struggle. According to the Marxist framework, this struggle is the primary "driving force" of historical development in class-divided societies. The highest manifestation of the class struggle is a social revolution, a period of intense conflict in which one mode of production is replaced by another. A revolution occurs when the existing ruling class, and the production relations it upholds, becomes an obstacle to the further development of the productive forces. The main feature of a social revolution is the transfer of state power from the old, obsolete ruling class to the new, rising one, which then uses this power to break up the old production relations and establish new ones. Within this framework, Marx saw capitalism as full of "intersecting and overlapping contradictions", which contain the potential for a communist society. These contradictions include those between use-value and exchange-value, capital and labour, and social production and private appropriation. For Marx, these systemic tensions contained the "evidence for socialism" within capitalism itself.

== Methodology ==
Diagram depicting Marx's method of empirical-analytical research and systematic-dialectical presentation, as used in Capital

As a research framework, historical materialism is distinguished by its methodology, which Marx and Engels developed through an analogy with the natural sciences, seeking to discover the laws of motion and development governing human society. This method involves a two-part process: a "method of inquiry" (analysis) and a "method of presentation" (synthesis). A central component is the "process of abstraction", which is the intellectual activity of breaking down the "real concrete" (the world as it presents itself) into mental units with which to think about it, and then reassembling them into the "thought concrete" (a reconstituted, understood whole in the mind). For Marx, however, such analytic abstractions are not universal but are themselves "a product of historic relations, and possess their full validity only for and within these relations." Marx's historical analysis also involved "studying history backward" by using the present as a vantage point to understand the past. As he famously put it, "The anatomy of the human being is a key to the anatomy of the ape."

=== Method of inquiry ===
The inquiry begins with the appropriation of factual and conceptual material. Faced with the "chaotic conception of the whole" of a given society, the researcher employs "the force of abstraction" to isolate the essential, recurrent features from the contingent and non-essential ones. This procedure, which Marx compared to that used by physicists, involves mentally "thinking away" specific, variable factors to reveal the underlying social laws. This method is a "critique", in that it involves excavating the "conditions of possibility" for the phenomenal forms that society takes, thereby revealing the historical origins and limits of the theoretical categories used to apprehend them. According to Bertell Ollman, Marx's method of abstraction operates in three modes:

1. "Abstraction of extension" sets the spatial and temporal boundaries of the subject matter. Marx abstracts his concepts broadly enough to include the processes of historical change and systemic interaction as part of what they are. For example, 'capital' is abstracted to include not only the means of production but also its own history (from primitive accumulation) and its likely future development (concentration, centralization, and the transition to socialism).
2. "Abstraction of level of generality" establishes the scale of focus, moving between the most specific (the unique individual or event) and the most general (the human condition as a whole). Marx's analysis primarily operates at the level of the capitalist mode of production, but also encompasses the levels of modern capitalism, class society in general, and the unique historical circumstances of a particular event. This allows him to isolate the specific dynamics of capitalism while also understanding their broader historical context.
3. "Abstraction of vantage point" sets the perspective from which a particular relation or process is viewed. The same relationship (e.g., between capital and labour) can be analyzed from the vantage point of capital, labour, or the system as a whole. Changing the vantage point is a crucial aspect of the dialectical method, allowing the researcher to grasp the different facets of a complex, interactive system.

This process of abstraction lays bare the "economic formation of society" and its most essential feature—the relation between the dominant classes, such as capitalist and worker—which is then reduced to a "standard type" for scientific analysis.

=== Method of presentation ===
The method of presentation reverses the process of inquiry. It begins with the simple, abstract categories derived from analysis and systematically reassembles them to "reproduce the concrete in the course of reasoning". This synthetic method of "successive approximation" moves from the most abstract level to progressively more concrete ones by reintroducing the factors that were initially abstracted away.

Marx's Capital provides the main example of this method. Volume I presents the capitalist mode of production in its "ideal average", a highly abstract model with only two classes (capitalists and workers) and no derivative forms of capital like merchant or interest-bearing capital. Volumes II and III reintroduce these "concrete forms" (circulation, profit, rent), moving step-by-step toward a more complete picture of capitalist society "as it appears on the surface". The method allows for the derivation of the "forms of appearance" (profit, rent, wages) from the underlying "essence" (value and surplus-value), and for the explanation of specific historical phenomena, including ideological relations and even the role of contingent "historic personalities". Once the underlying relations have been revealed, the final step is a historical account of how those relations were in fact constructed by "real, living individuals".

=== The dialectical method and historical transitions ===
To analyze the process of historical development—the transition from one social formation to another—historical materialism employs a dialectical method. According to this method, the researcher identifies "mutually exclusive relations" within a social system and discovers how these tensions are historically resolved through the emergence of new social relations.

The analysis in Capital of the transition from simple commodity production to capitalism serves as a key example. The attempt to explain capital (M–C–M', or money that begets more money) using the conceptual system of simple commodity exchange (C–M–C, where equivalents are exchanged) leads to a logical contradiction. This contradiction reflects a real historical problem that was resolved by the appearance of a new commodity, labour power, the consumption of which could create more value than it cost. The logical solution to the contradiction—the development of a new, more comprehensive conceptual system (theory of capitalism) that includes the old one (theory of simple commodity production) as a special case—is analogous to the process of generalization in mathematics and physics. In this way, the logical relationship between the two theories is held to "reflect" the real historical transition between the two social formations.

== Engels and dialectical materialism ==
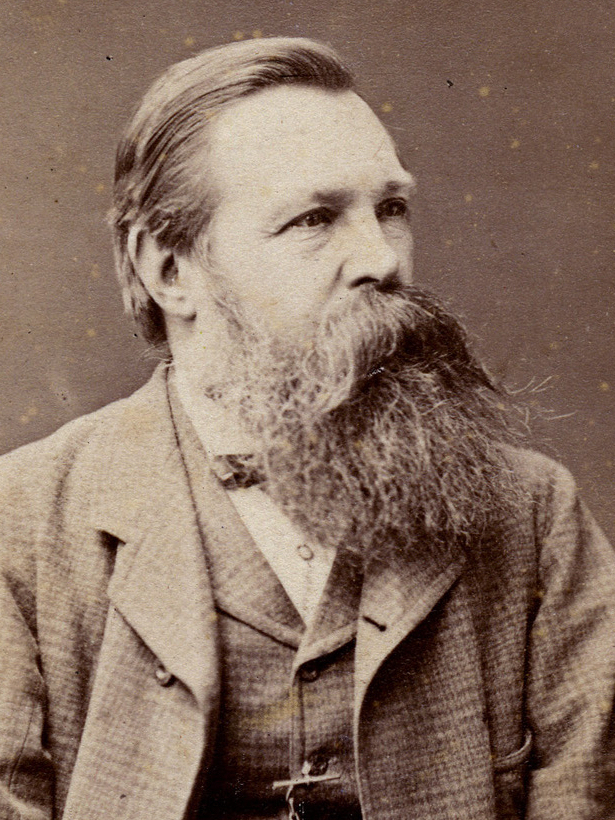
Friedrich Engels, in his later writings, systematized Marx's theory of history within a broader philosophical framework later termed dialectical materialism.

Friedrich Engels argued that, just as Charles Darwin had discovered the law of evolution in organic nature, Marx had discovered "the law of development of human history". He applied this materialist method to anthropology in works like "The Part Played by Labour in the Transition from Ape to Man" (1876) and The Origin of the Family, Private Property and the State (1884). In the former, he presented a materialist account of human origins, arguing that the evolution of an upright posture in early hominids freed their hands for labour. This adaptation led to tool use, which in turn acted as a stimulus for rapid brain expansion and the development of language. In the latter, Engels explained the historical rise of class society, the state, and women's oppression as consequences of the shift from hunter-gatherer to agricultural societies. The increased productivity of labour generated a social surplus, leading to the emergence of private property, class divisions, and a state apparatus to protect the interests of the new ruling class.

After Marx's death in 1883, Engels undertook the task of systematizing and popularizing their shared worldview. In works such as Anti-Dühring (1878), Dialectics of Nature, and Ludwig Feuerbach and the End of Classical German Philosophy (1888), Engels framed historical materialism as a specific application of a more comprehensive philosophical system, later termed dialectical materialism. Engels posited that the dialectic was not merely a method for analyzing history but a set of universal laws governing motion in nature, society, and thought. These laws—the transformation of quantity into quality, the interpenetration of opposites, and the negation of the negation—were held to be discoverable in and abstracted from the "real world". Philosophy, in this view, was "sublated" (both overcome and preserved) into a "world-outlook" that found its application within the positive sciences.

This move, according to the analysis of scholar George Lichtheim, represented a significant shift away from the "critical theory" of Marx's early years toward a positivist and evolutionary science. He argues that this interpretation, while intended to give Marxism a more "scientific" and authoritative basis in an age dominated by positivism, lost the original emphasis on conscious human activity ("praxis") and the philosophical critique of alienation. According to this view, Engels's "materialist evolutionism" presented history as a causally determined process in which socialism was the inevitable outcome of economic laws. Even in his more nuanced later letters, intended to counter deterministic misinterpretations, Engels used phrases like the economy being the "ultimately determining element", a formulation Marx himself did not employ, which suggested a residual commitment to a form of economic determinism. Other scholars, however, argue against the view of a sharp break between Marx and Engels, maintaining that the core methodological approaches of internal relations and abstraction were shared between them.

== Later developments ==
=== Second International ===
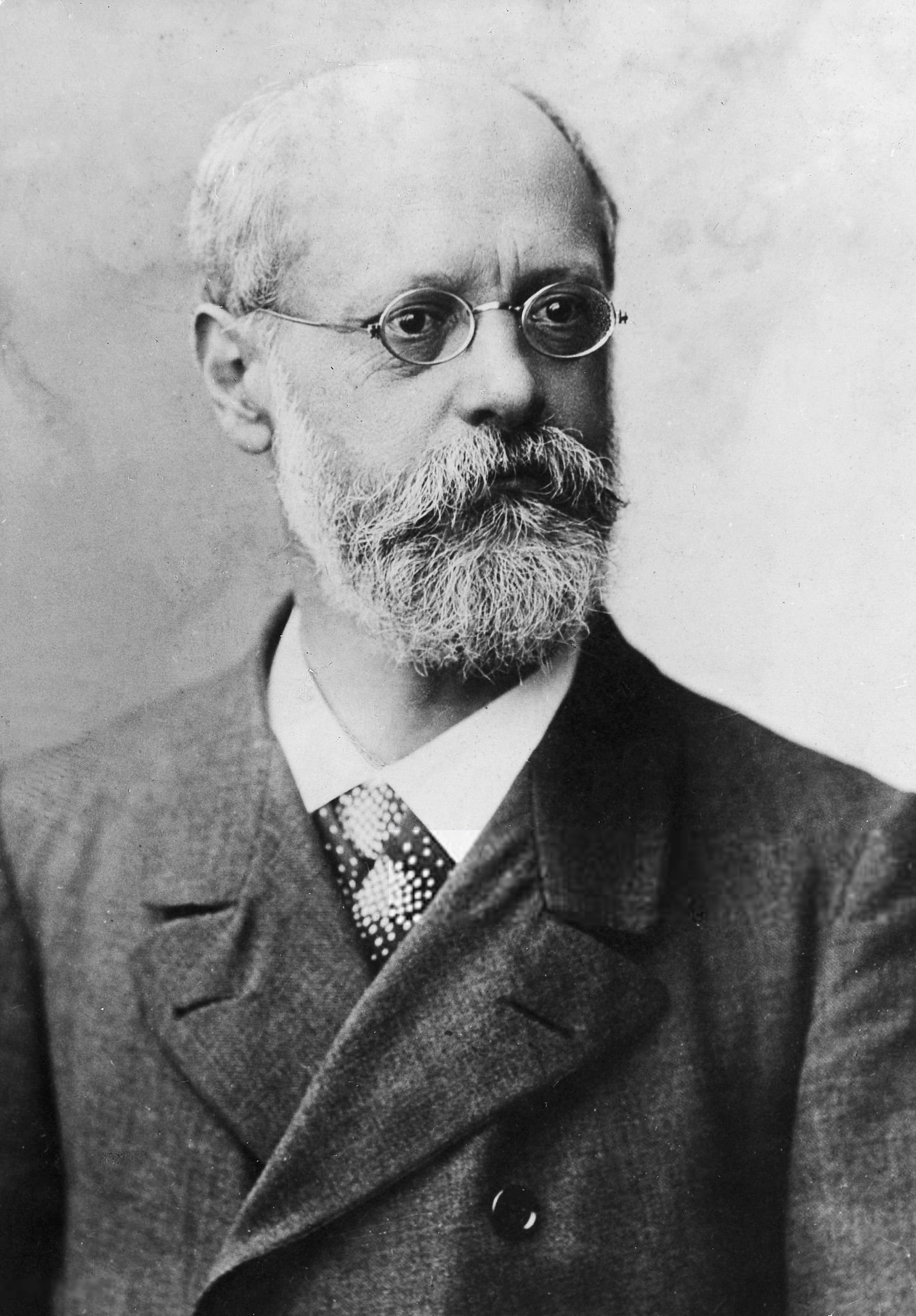
Karl Kautsky

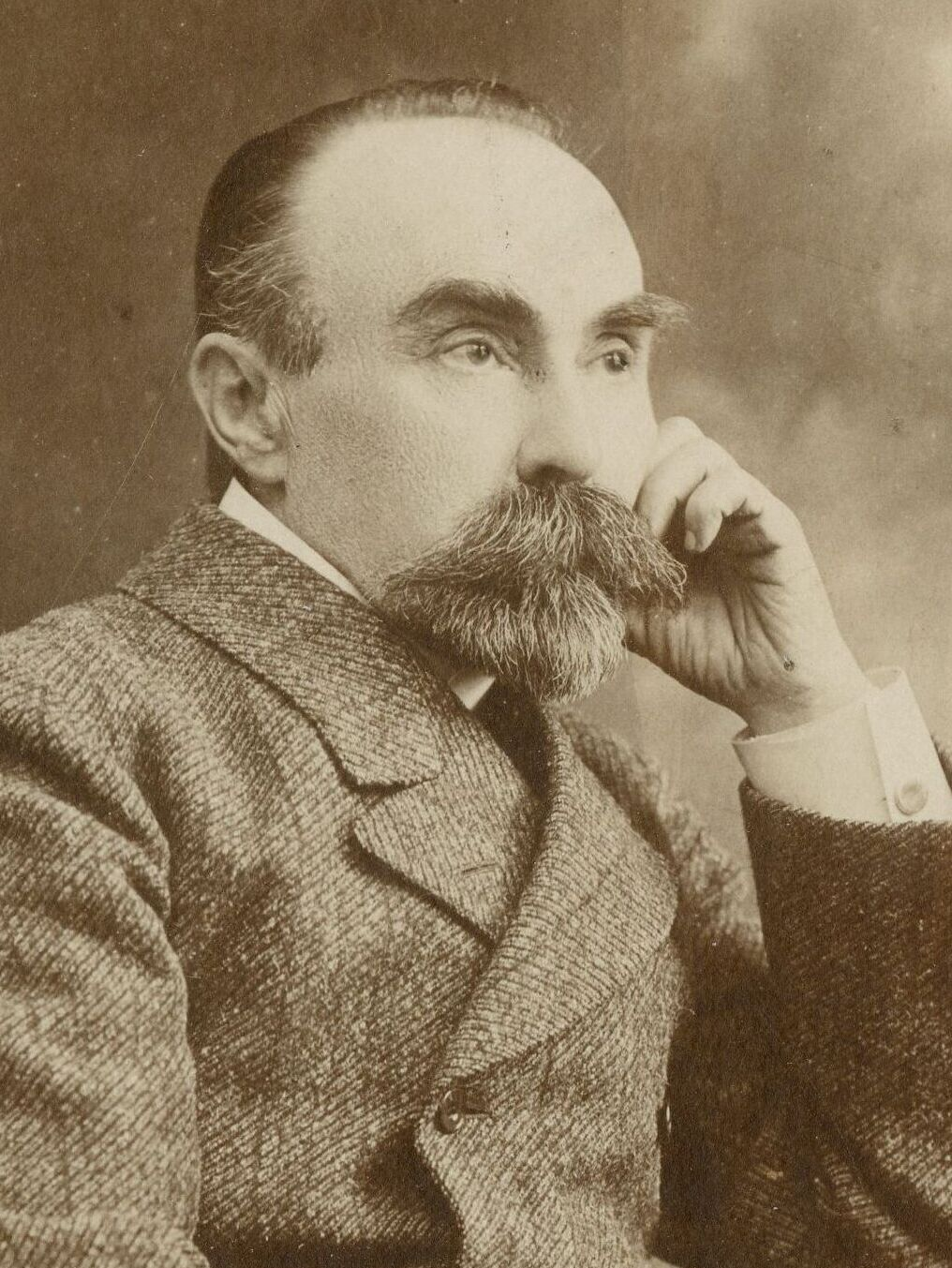
Georgi Plekhanov

The Second International (1889–1914) became the "undoubted custodian of Marxist 'orthodoxy'". The interpretation of historical materialism developed during this period has been heavily criticized as a form of "fatalistic" and "mechanically deterministic" social evolutionism. The "productive force determinist" reading of Marx became the dominant view. This was partly because of the influence of Marx's own aphorisms and the 1859 Preface, and partly because this "inevitabilist" interpretation suited the political practice of the Second International, which drew confidence from the persistent growth of the workers' movement. The dominant intellectual of the International, Karl Kautsky, was often seen as the primary proponent of a Darwinian-inspired, deterministic Marxism, arguing that just as species became extinct or adapted, so too was capitalism doomed to extinction. In his earlier work, however, Kautsky developed a more nuanced analysis that rejected unilinear models of history and stressed the causal significance of ideas.

Other leading theorists of the era, such as Georgi Plekhanov and Antonio Labriola, sought to develop more sophisticated versions of historical materialism. Plekhanov aimed to systematize the theory as a comprehensive worldview capable of replacing "rival bourgeois disciplines". He sought to counter the "factoral approach" of non-Marxist historians by arguing that humanity has a single, indivisible history, with social relations determined by the state of the productive forces. Labriola, in his Essays on the Materialist Conception of History (1896), challenged the compartmentalization of history into separate economic, political, and ideological spheres. He argued for an "organic conception of history" in which society is understood as a dynamic and hierarchically structured totality, not a simple collection of distinct parts. Plekhanov praised Labriola's "synthetic view of social life" as a powerful alternative to both crude economism and ahistorical pluralism.

=== Russian Revolution and the Comintern ===
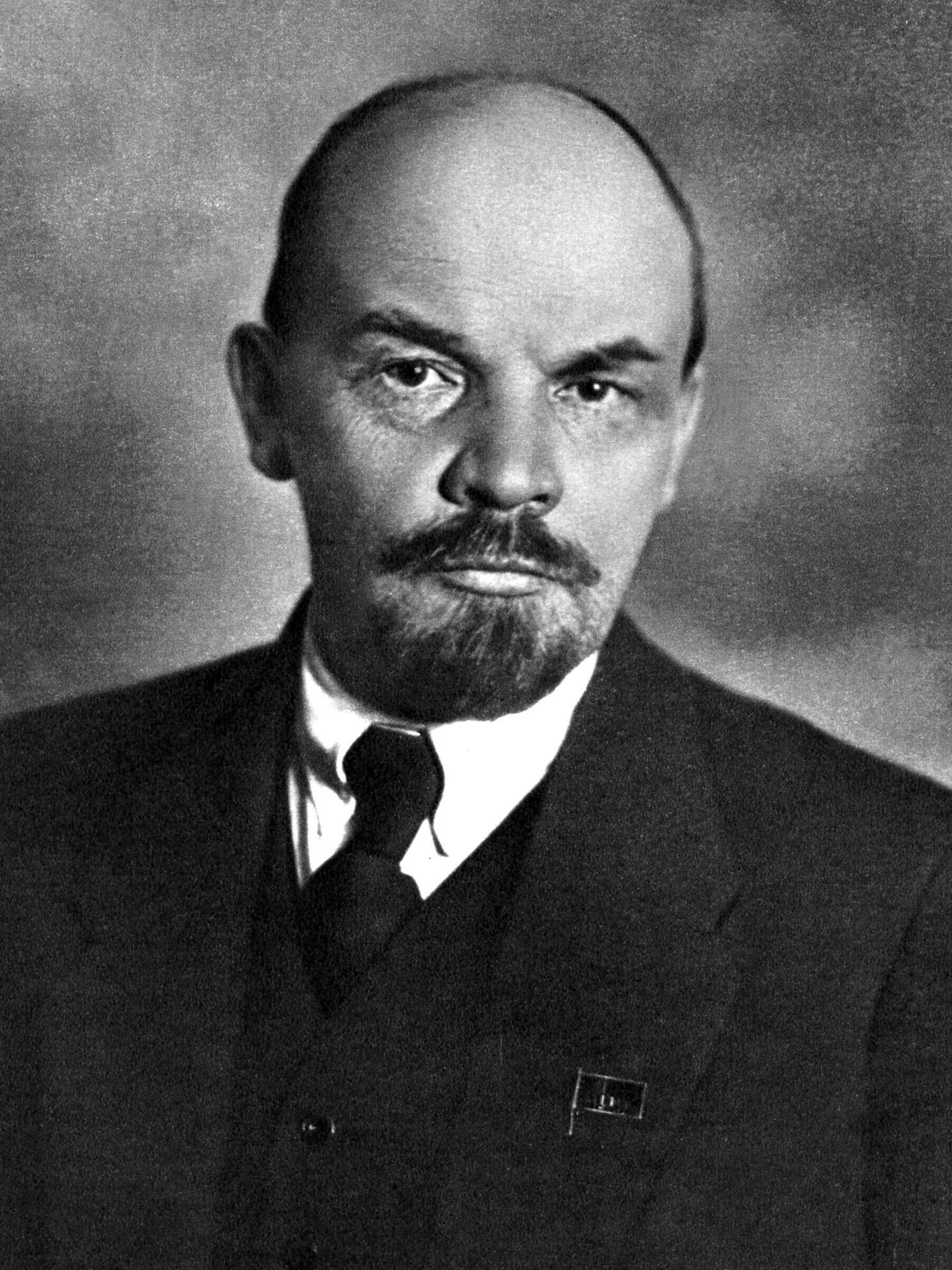
Vladimir Lenin

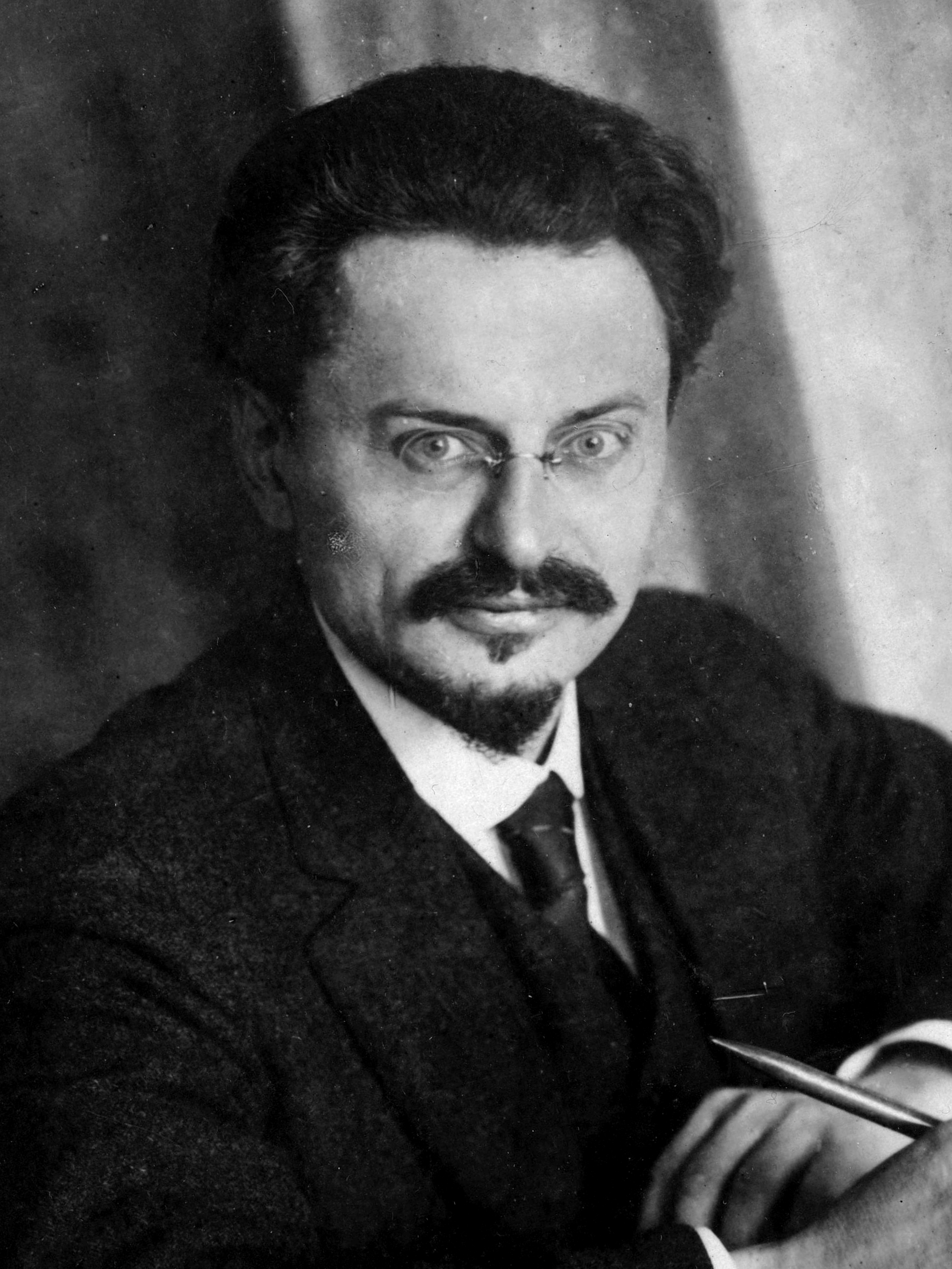
Leon Trotsky

The Russian Revolution of 1917 and the subsequent formation of the Communist International (Comintern) marked a new stage in the development of historical materialism, with the revolutionary context spurring new theoretical work. However, despite the political break with the "mechanistic" Marxism of the Second International, the leaders of the Comintern largely adhered to the same theoretical framework of productive force determinism. Vladimir Lenin, for example, summarized historical materialism with a long quotation from the 1859 Preface, arguing that Marx's greatness lay in showing how "out of one system of social life another and higher system develops", such as capitalism out of feudalism, "in consequence of the growth of the productive forces".

A significant development of this period was Leon Trotsky's theory of combined and uneven development. Building on the insights of earlier theorists, Trotsky argued that capitalism's global expansion did not create a uniform path of development. Instead, it generated "an amalgam of archaic with more contemporary forms", forcing backward countries to "make leaps" to catch up. This analysis underpinned his theory of permanent revolution, which contended that in a backward country like Russia, a workers' revolution could accomplish the tasks of a bourgeois revolution before "growing over" into a socialist one, provided it sparked a wider international revolution. Trotsky's The History of the Russian Revolution (1930) is considered a major achievement of Marxist historiography, combining a "total history" of the revolution's events with a deep analysis of its social and economic dynamics.

Philosophically, the post-revolutionary period saw a turn away from the determinism of the Second International. Western Marxist thinkers like Georg Lukács in History and Class Consciousness (1923) and Antonio Gramsci in his Prison Notebooks (1929–1935) reasserted the centrality of conscious human agency, arguing against fatalism that revolution was not an automatic process but the "product of the – free – action of the proletariat itself".

=== Stalinism and "people's history" ===
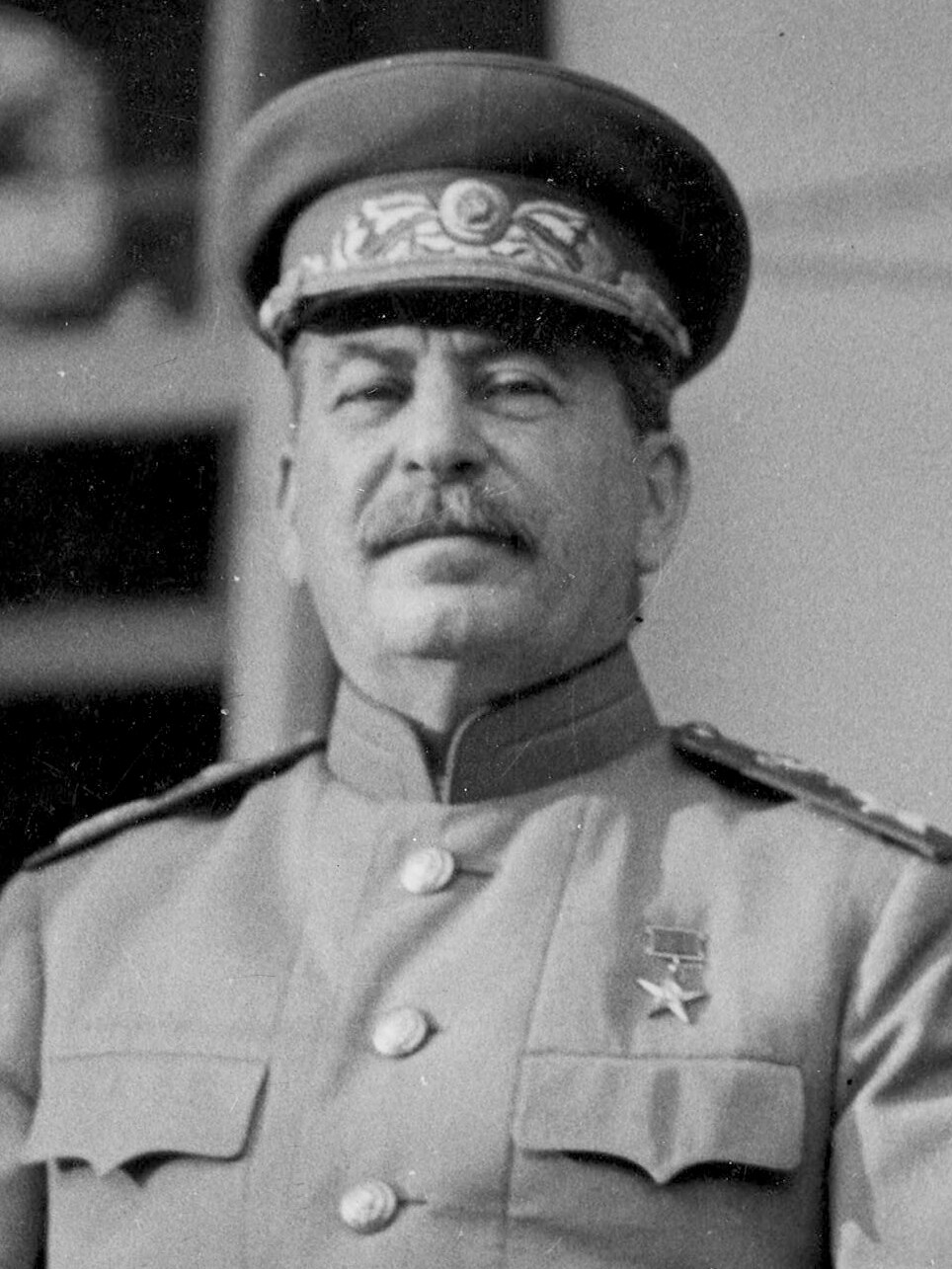
Joseph Stalin

Following the isolation of the Russian Revolution, a new interpretation of Marxism began to take shape in the 1920s under Joseph Stalin. This process codified historical materialism into a rigid, unilinear, and fatalistic schema, which held that all societies must mechanically pass through a fixed sequence of stages: primitive communism, slave, feudal, capitalist, and socialist. Concepts that suggested a more complex, multilinear view of history, such as Marx's Asiatic mode of production, were suppressed. Stalin's 1938 pamphlet Dialectical and Historical Materialism became the official, dogmatic text of this new schema.

Despite the dominance of this orthodoxy, creative Marxist historical work continued. In 1931, Soviet physicist Boris Hessen presented a path-breaking paper, "The Social and Economic Roots of Newton's Principia", which demythologized Isaac Newton by analyzing his work in the material and social context of 17th-century merchant capitalism. The Comintern's shift to a Popular Front strategy in 1935, which sought alliances with non-communist forces against fascism, also opened the door to a new kind of radical historiography. This "people's history", while often eliding class distinctions in favor of a populist narrative, laid the groundwork for the later achievements of the Communist Party Historians Group in Britain. The work of figures like Maurice Dobb, whose 1946 Studies in the Development of Capitalism was a foundational text, rejected crude economic reductionism and established a research paradigm that would be extended by historians such as Christopher Hill, Eric Hobsbawm, and E. P. Thompson.

=== Post-World War II debates ===
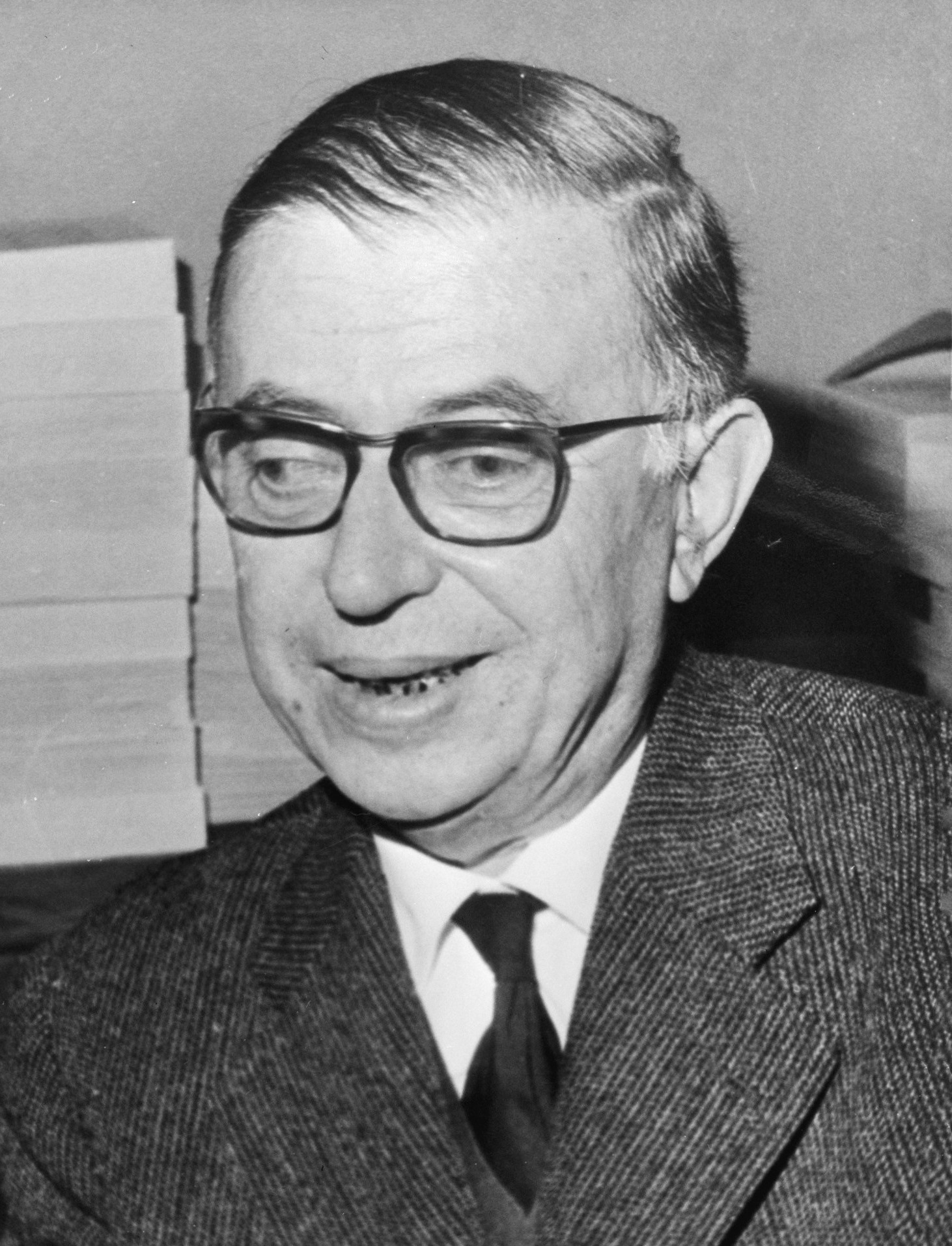
Jean-Paul Sartre

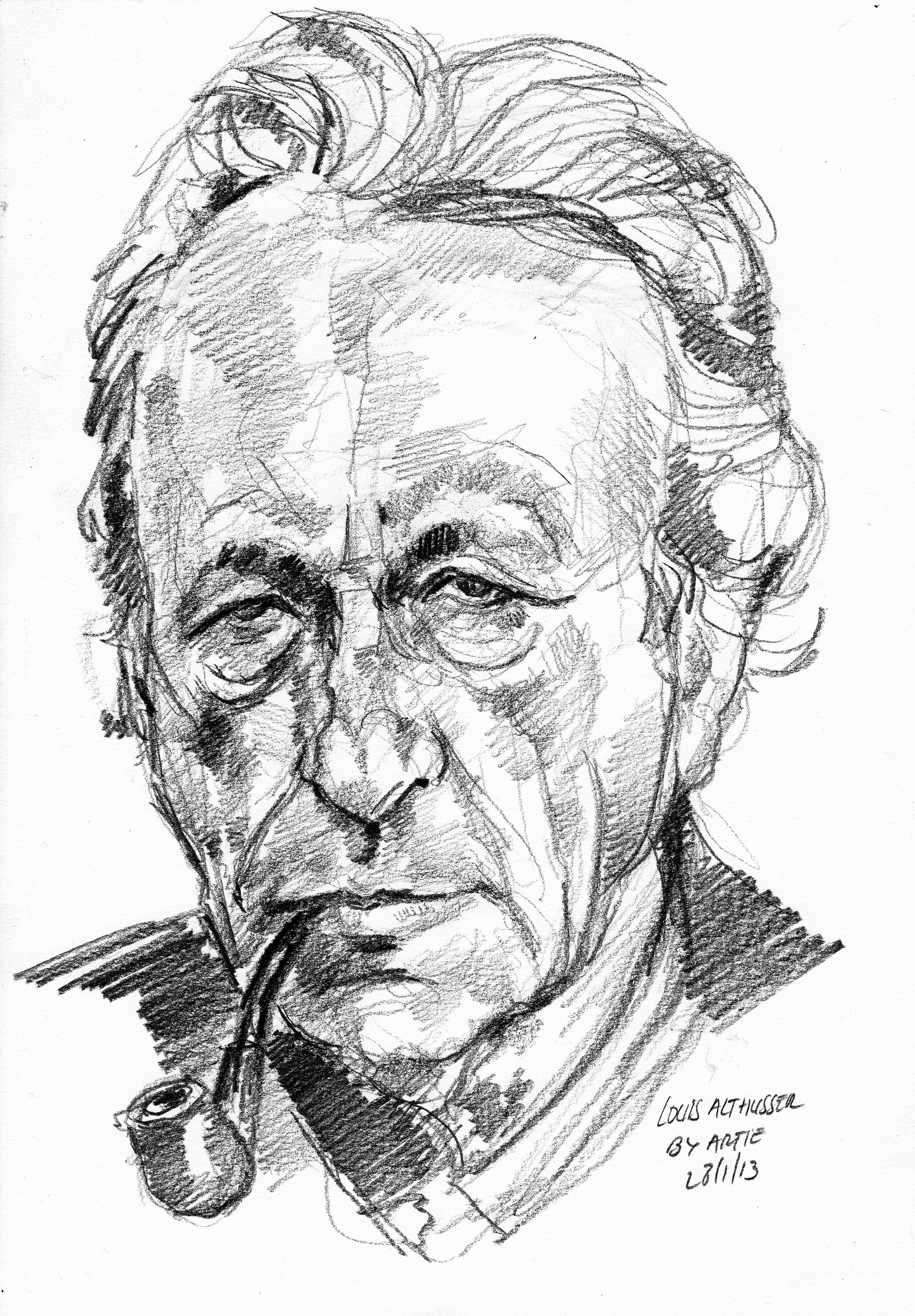
Louis Althusser

In the post-war period, the debate on historical materialism was polarized between two main camps: the humanistic existentialism of Jean-Paul Sartre and the structuralist Marxism of Louis Althusser. Sartre, in his Critique of Dialectical Reason (1960), sought to "reconquer man within Marxism" by placing the free, active human subject at the center of his analysis. He criticized the schematic historiography of Stalinism for its tendency to impose abstract, a priori models on history, thereby dissolving the real, concrete actions of individuals. Sartre's "progressive-regressive method" aimed to understand history as the product of individual "projects", but his reliance on transhistorical categories like "scarcity" and the "practico-inert"—social structures that appear as the alienated, unintended consequences of action—ultimately led to a pessimistic and fatalistic view in which history appears as an "inevitable" consequence of human alienation.

In contrast, Althusser, influenced by French structuralist thought, rejected the humanist emphasis on the subject and argued that history is a "process without a subject". For Althusser, the true subjects of history are the relations of production. He developed a concept of "structural causality" in which social formations are understood as complex totalities "overdetermined" by a plurality of contradictions, with the economy being the determinant "in the last instance". While Althusser's framework offered a powerful critique of crude economism and historicism, its rejection of human agency led to a form of "cosmic fatalism" that proved incapable of explaining the mass student and worker revolts of 1968. Althusser's thesis of an "epistemological break" between the "young" humanist Marx and the "mature" scientific Marx has been influential, but also heavily criticized. Scholars such as Melvin Rader and Derek Sayer argue for a fundamental continuity in Marx's thought, contending that Marx never abandoned his humanistic critique of alienation and abstraction. They see the later economic works as a continuation of the earlier philosophical concerns, but expressed in the language of economic analysis. The "inner dialectic" of human needs and powers, rooted in a concept of human nature, remains a crucial, though often implicit, element in Marx's theory of historical crisis.

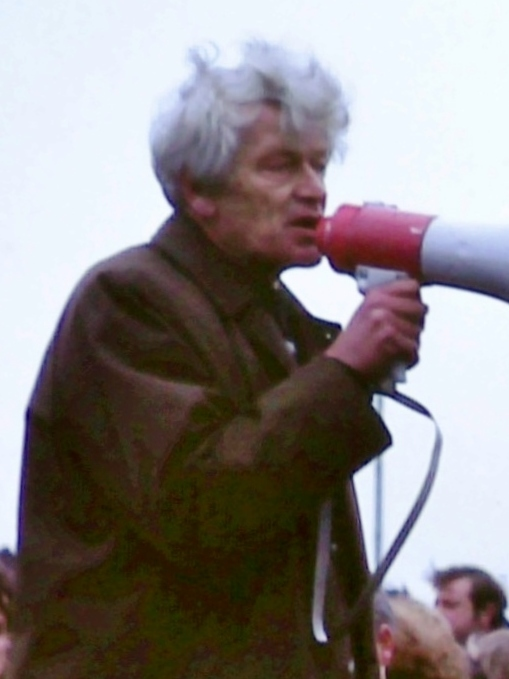
E. P. Thompson's The Making of the English Working Class (1963) was a landmark study that defined class as a historical relationship and process, shaped by human experience and agency.

The renewal of historical materialism in the Anglophone world was largely driven by the work of the Communist Party Historians Group, particularly E. P. Thompson. His monumental 1963 study, The Making of the English Working Class, reinserted human agency into the heart of Marxist history. Thompson defined class not as a static "structure" or "category", but as a historical relationship that "happens... in human relationships". He argued that class consciousness is "the way in which these experiences [of class] are handled in cultural terms", reasserting the active role of workers in making their own history. The subsequent debate between Thompson and Althusser (and their respective followers) polarized around the concepts of agency and structure, with Thompson championing a humanist, "voluntarist" Marxism and Althusser a structuralist, anti-humanist one. In his polemics, Thompson was sometimes criticized for a tendency to "sentimentalise human beings" while bracketing the objective conditions that shaped their struggles.

In the late 1970s and 1980s, a new synthesis began to emerge. The work of G. A. Cohen, in Karl Marx's Theory of History: A Defence (1978), provided a sophisticated but controversial restatement of productive-force determinism within the tradition of Analytical Marxism. Cohen defended what he called "orthodox historical materialism" by arguing for a functional explanation of the theory's "Primacy Thesis": relations of production exist because they are suited to developing the productive forces. This gave rise to "rational-choice Marxism," a branch of analytical Marxism led by thinkers such as Jon Elster and John Roemer, who sought to rebuild the theory on the foundations of methodological individualism and often rejected the labour theory of value in favor of neoclassical models. Elster criticized Cohen's functionalism as invalid, arguing that it lacked a specified causal "feedback mechanism," unlike natural selection in biology. Historian Robert Brenner challenged Cohen's transhistorical "Development Thesis," arguing that only specifically capitalist property relations created a systemic imperative for intensive economic growth.

Reacting to the perceived weaknesses of both Althusserian structuralism and Thompsonian voluntarism, thinkers like Alex Callinicos and the early Alasdair MacIntyre sought to develop a version of historical materialism that could synthesize structure and agency without reducing one to the other. Drawing on the philosophical tradition of critical realism, they argued for a model in which social structures, as "the ever present condition and continually reproduced outcome of human agency", both constrain and enable the actions of individuals. This approach, which attempts to integrate an objective, "analytical" conception of class with a nuanced understanding of the historical and cultural formation of class consciousness, represents one of the most powerful contemporary reinterpretations of historical materialism.

== See also ==
- Dialectical Materialism and Historical Materialism
- Fundamentals of Marxism–Leninism
- Parametric determinism
- Technological unemployment
- Theory of historical trajectory
