= Economist (disambiguation) =

An economist is a practitioner in the social science discipline of economics.

Economist or The Economist may also refer to:

- Economist Group, a UK media company
- Economist Party (Peru), a political party
- Economist Party (Thailand), a political party
- De Economist, the journal of The Royal Netherlands Economic Association
- The Economist, a weekly newspaper in magazine format
- The Economist (Lost), an episode of the TV series Lost

== See also ==
- Economy (disambiguation)
- The Economists' Voice
- List of economists
- The Oeconomist
