= Social formation =

Marxist concept

Social formation (German: Gesellschaftsformation) is a Marxist concept (synonymous with 'society') referring to the concrete, historical articulation between the capitalist mode of production, maintaining pre-capitalist modes of production, and the institutional context of the economy (disambiguation). This theory of the capitalist mode of production can be found in Karl Marx's Capital.

Marx used the term in his analysis of society's economic and political development.

Karl Marx did not postulate that the issue of socio-economic formations was finally resolved and distinguished different formations in different works.

Although Marx did not formulate a complete theory of socio-economic formations, a generalization of his statements became the basis for Soviet historians to conclude that he distinguished five formations in accordance with the prevailing industrial relations and forms of ownership:

- Prehistory
- Slavery
- Feudalism
- Capitalism
- Communism

Marx took a paradigm for understanding the power-relationships between capitalists and wage-labourers: "in pre-capitalist systems it was obvious that most people did not control their own destiny—under feudalism, for instance, serfs had to work for their lords. Capitalism seems different because people are in theory free to work for themselves or for others as they choose. Yet most workers have as little control over their lives as feudal serfs."

== Bibliography ==
- Cohen, G. A. 1978. Karl Marx's Theory of History: A Defence. Princeton, NJ: Princeton University Press. Expanded ed., 2000.
- Karl Marx: Die deutsche Ideologie (1844). In: MEW 3, Berlin: Dietz 1956 ff.
- Karl Marx: Manifest der Kommunistischen Partei (1844). In: MEW 4, Berlin: Dietz 1956 ff.
- Karl Marx: Zur Kritik der Politischen Ökonomie (1859). In: MEW 13, Berlin: Dietz 1956 ff.
- Konrad Lotter, Reinhard Meiners, Elmar Treptow: Marx-Engels-Begriffslexikon. Beck, München 1984, ISBN 3-406-09273-X, S. 135 ff.
- György Lukács: Geschichte und Klassenbewußtsein (1923), Berlin: Luchterhand 1973.
- Dieter Nohlen, Rainer-Olaf Schultze (Hg.): Lexikon der Politikwissenschaft. Theorien, Methoden, Begriffe. Bd. 1, 2005, S. 301.
