= Economics (disambiguation) =

Economics is a social science that studies the production, distribution, and consumption of goods and services.

Economics may also refer to:

== Literature ==
- Economics: Principles, Problems, and Policies (1960–present), American textbook
- Economics (1948–2009), a textbook by American economists Paul Samuelson and William Nordhaus
- Economics, sometimes referred to as The Economics, a work traditionally ascribed to Aristotle
- "Economics" (1977), a poem from Still More Lecherous Limericks by Isaac Asimov

== Music ==
- "Economics" (2014), a song from Good Morning Vietnam 3: The Phoenix Program by MF Grimm and Drasar Monumental, American hip hop
- "Economics" (2010), a song by Rapids!, English indie rock
- "Economics" (2009), a song from Champions by Blakfish, British mathcore/death pop
- "Economics" (2001), a demo from The Early Years: Rare Demos '91–'94 by Ill Bill, American rapper and record producer

== Other uses ==
- Several university schools of Economics so named, e.g., London School of Economics
- Several government ministries of Economics so named
