= Econ group (Greece) =

ECON (not to be confused with companies in other countries with the same name) was a Greek conglomerate, named after its founder Christos Economides. It was founded in 1950 as an engineering company but it progressively diversified in other areas including defence equipment, focusing during the 1980s on electronics and electro-optical system development and production. By 1995 it had rapidly evolved into a major defence group with four factories involved in high-tech constructions, including mechanical engineering, optics, electronics, digital imaging equipment, explosives etc. However, this growth was followed by an equally rapid collapse only a few years later, leading to one more dark page in the history of Greek defence industry. Parts of the company were reorganized into Thalis sensors (later Theon sensors).

== External links/References ==
- L.S. Skartsis, "Modern Greece's Machines: A Comprehensive Guide to Greek Vehicle & Machine Manufacturers (1700 to Present)" (2026) ISBN 978-618-00-6734-7 (eBook)
- 1995 Interview of Mr. D. Economides (in Greek)
- Theon sensors company site
