= Tool use in primates =

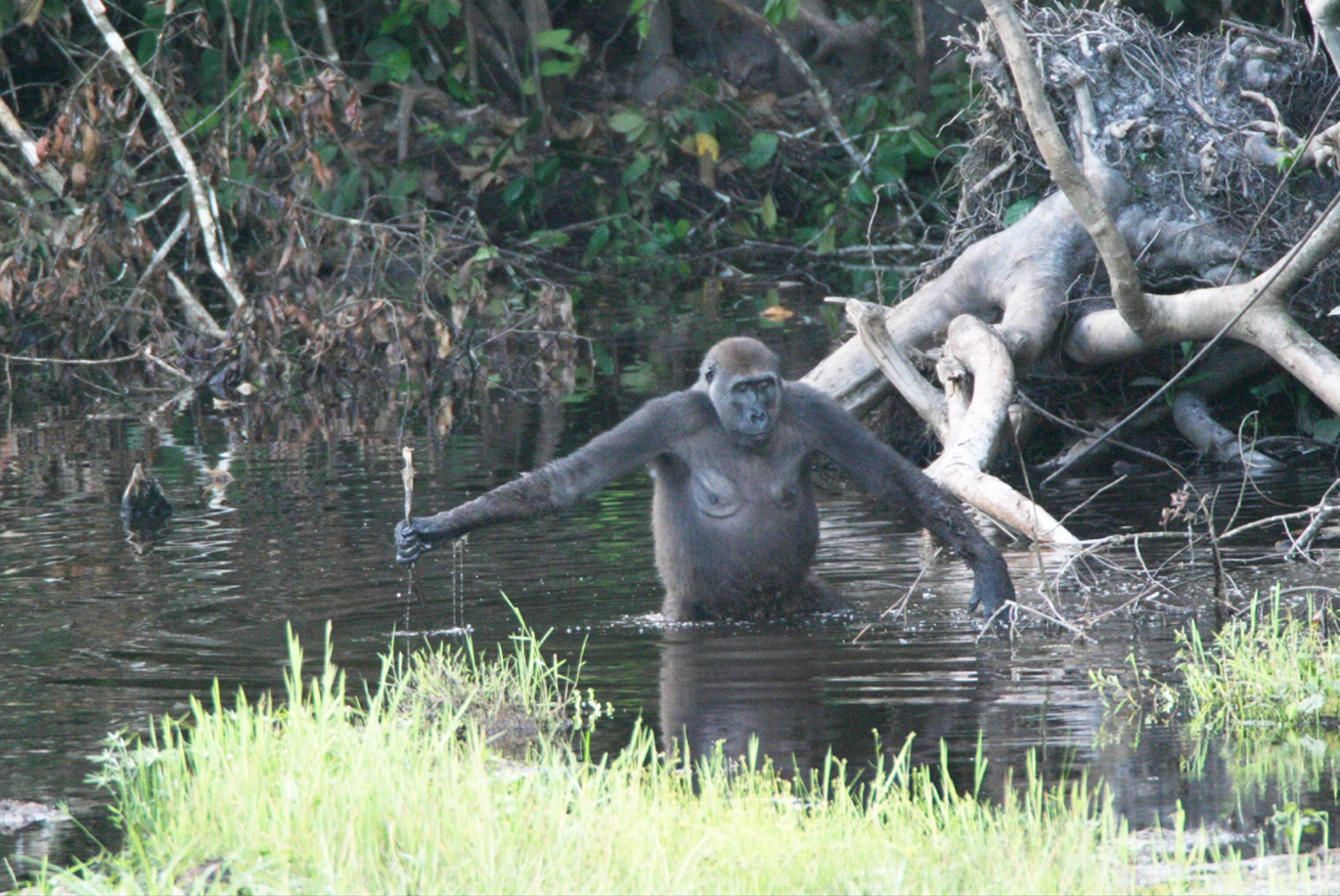
A western lowland gorilla, G. g. gorilla, using a stick to gauge the depth of water

Tool use has been reported many times in both wild and captive primates, particularly the great apes. The use of tools by primates is varied and includes hunting (mammals, invertebrates, fish), collecting honey, processing food (nuts, fruits, vegetables and seeds), collecting water, weapons and shelter. Tool manufacture is much rarer than simple tool use and probably represents higher cognitive functioning. Soon after her initial discovery of tool use, the primatologist Jane Goodall observed other chimpanzees picking up leafy twigs, stripping off the leaves and using the stems to fish for insects. This change of a leafy twig into a tool was a major discovery. Prior to this, some scientists thought that only humans manufactured and used tools, and that this ability was one thing that separated humans from other animals. In 1990, it was claimed the only primate to manufacture tools in the wild was the chimpanzee. However, since then, several primates have been reported as tool makers in the wild.

== Taxonomic range ==
=== Chimpanzees and bonobos ===
Chimpanzees are sophisticated tool users with behaviours including cracking nuts with stone tools and fishing for ants or termites with sticks. These chimpanzees not only use these sticks to fish out their meal, but they in fact build their own 'tool kits' to do so, as observed in the Republic of Congo. They first use a smaller stick to break open the termite or ant mound, then use a large stick to make holes in the prey's colony, and then insert a 'fishing probe' into the hole and pull out all the termites or ants that have gathered on the stick. Chimpanzees were found to deliberately choose plants that provide more flexible tools for termite fishing. There are more limited reports of the closely related bonobo (Pan paniscus) using tools in the wild; it has been claimed they rarely use tools in the wild although they use tools as readily as chimpanzees when in captivity, It has been reported that females of both chimpanzees and bonobos use tools more avidly than males. Leonid Firsov reported a case when two female chimpanzees had the keys to their cage accidentally left at least 2.7 m (9 ft) away from it, and managed to use objects at hand as improvised tools to retrieve them and get out. Wild chimpanzees predominantly use tools in the context of food acquisition, while wild bonobos appear to use tools mainly for personal care (cleaning, protection from rain) and social purposes. Wild bonobos have been observed using leaves as cover for rain, or the use of branches in social displays.

Both bonobos and chimpanzees have been observed making "sponges" out of leaves and moss that suck up water and using these for grooming. Sumatran orangutans will take a live branch, remove twigs and leaves and sometimes the bark, before fraying or flattening the tip for use on ants or bees. In the wild, mandrills have been observed to clean their ears with modified tools. Scientists filmed a large male mandrill at Chester Zoo (UK) stripping down a twig, apparently to make it narrower, and then using the modified stick to scrape dirt from underneath his toenails. Captive gorillas have made a variety of tools.

==== Hunting ====
Chimpanzees sharpen sticks to use as weapons when hunting mammals. This is considered the first evidence of systematic use of weapons in a species other than humans. Researchers documented 22 occasions when wild chimpanzees on a savanna in Senegal fashioned sticks into "spears" to hunt lesser bushbabies (Galago senegalensis). In each case, a chimpanzee modified a branch by breaking off one or two ends and, frequently using its teeth, sharpened the stick. The tools, on average, were about 60 cm (24 in) long and 1.1 cm (0.43 in) in circumference. The chimpanzee then jabbed the spear into hollows in tree trunks where bushbabies sleep. There was a single case in which a chimpanzee successfully extracted a bushbaby with the tool. It has been suggested that the word "spear" is an overstatement that makes the chimpanzees seem too much like early humans, and that the term "bludgeon" is more accurate, since the point of the tool may not be particularly sharp. This behaviour was seen more frequently in females, particularly adolescent females, and young chimps in general, than in adult males.

Chimpanzees often eat the marrow of long bones of colobus monkeys with the help of small sticks, after opening the ends of the bones with their teeth. A juvenile female was observed to eat small parts of the brain of an intact skull that she could not break open by inserting a small stick through the foramen magnum. On another occasion, an adult female used three sticks to clean the orbits of a colobus monkey skull after she had just eaten the eyes.

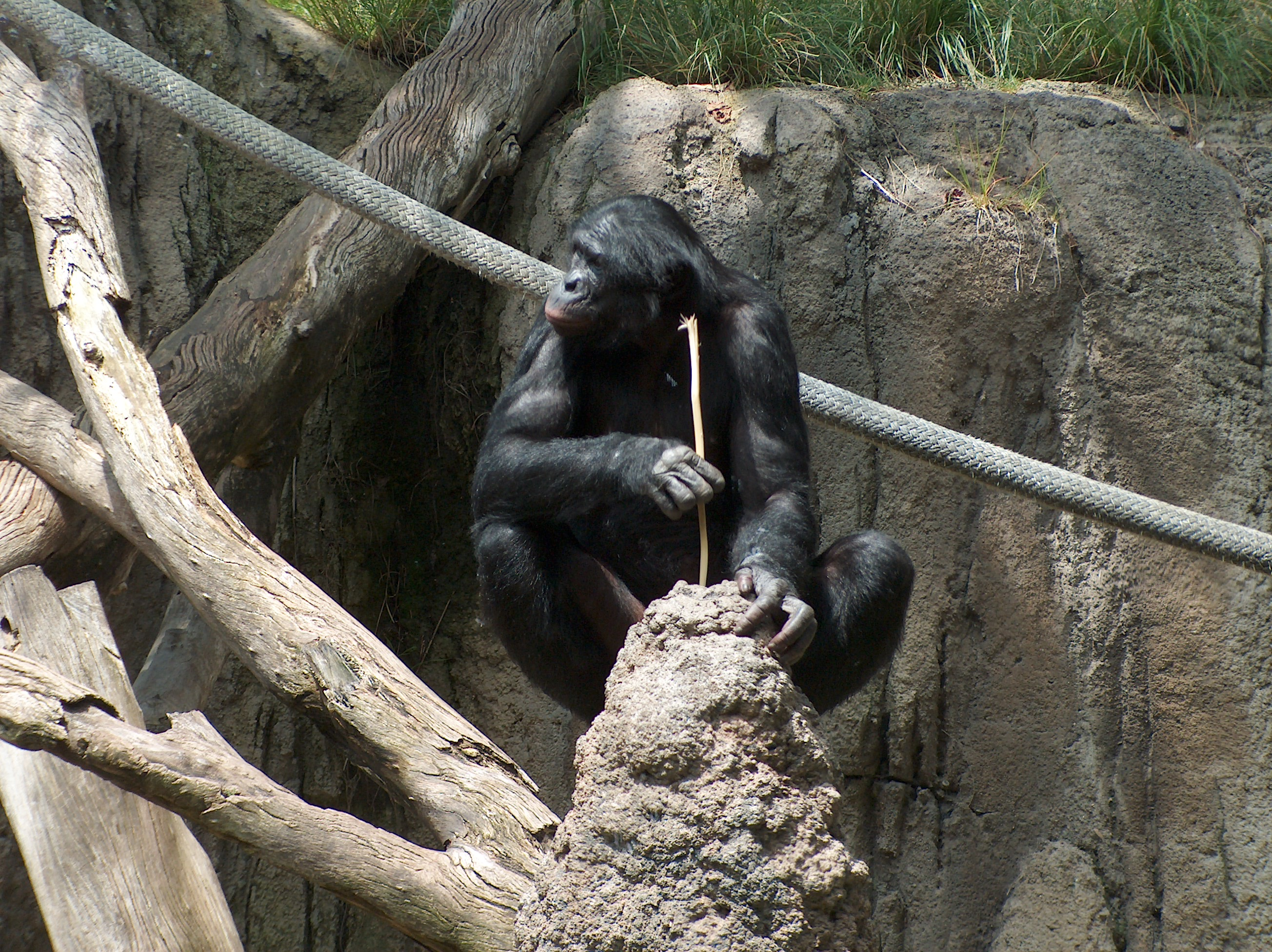
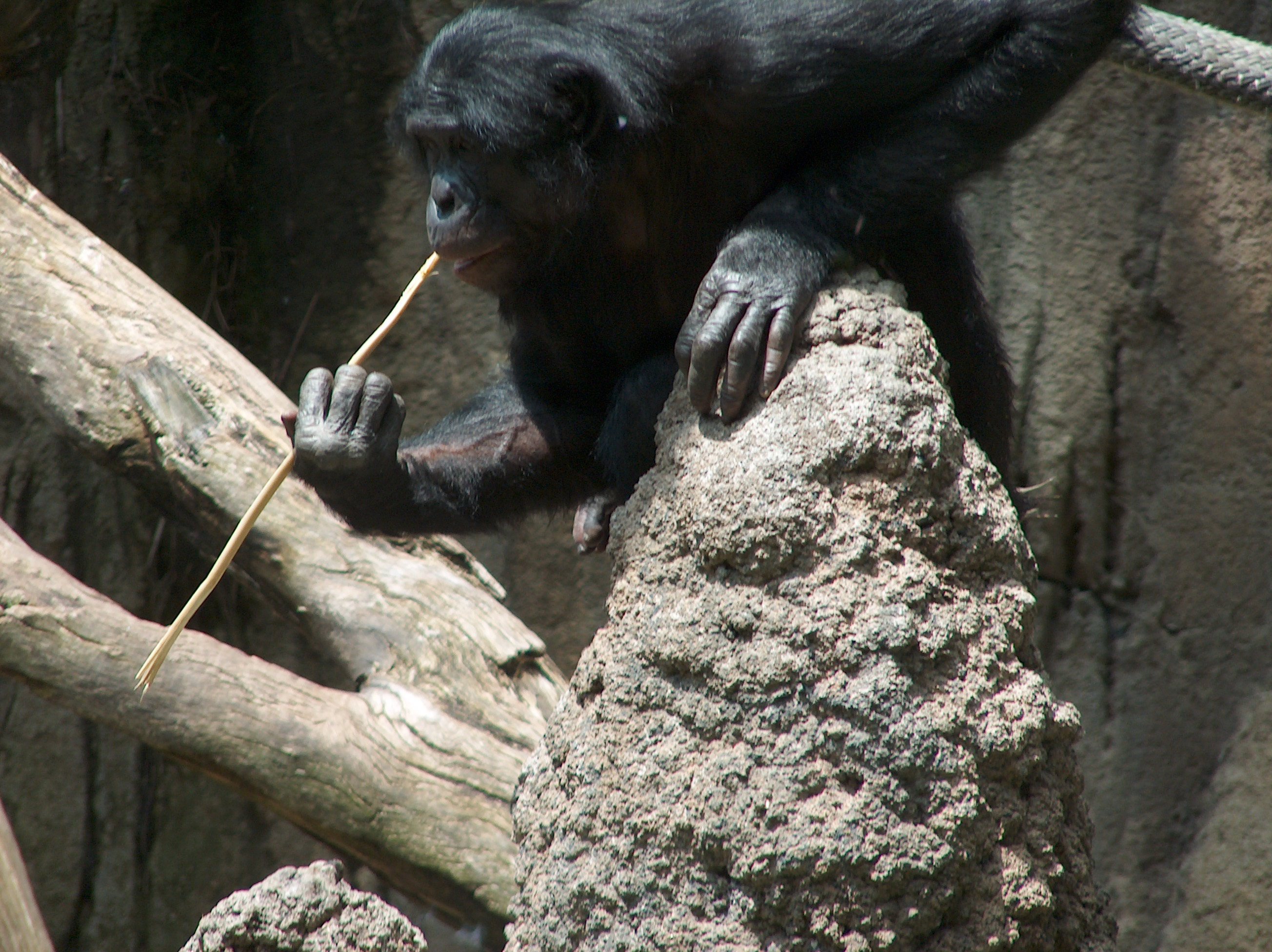
A bonobo fishing for termites

In Gombe National Park in 1960, Jane Goodall observed a chimpanzee, David Greybeard, poking pieces of grass into a termite mound and then raising the grass to his mouth. After he left, Goodall approached the mound and repeated the behaviour because she was unsure what David was doing. She found that the termites bit onto the grass with their jaws. David had been using the grass as a tool to "fish" or "dip" for termites. Soon after this initial discovery of tool use, Goodall observed David and other chimpanzees picking up leafy twigs, stripping off the leaves, and using the stems to fish for insects. This modification of a leafy twig into a tool was a major discovery: previously, scientists thought that only humans made and used tools, and that this was what separated humans from other animals.

Other studies of the Gombe chimps show that young females and males learn to fish for termites differently. Female chimps learn to fish for termites earlier and better than the young males. Females also spend more time fishing while at the mounds with their mothers—males spend more time playing. When they are adults, females need more termite protein because with young to care for, they cannot hunt the way males can.

Populations differ in the prevalence of tool use for fishing for invertebrates. Chimpanzees in the Tai National Park only sometimes use tools, whereas Gombe chimpanzees rely almost exclusively on tools for their intake of driver ants. This may be due to difference in the rewards gained by tool use: Gombe chimpanzees collect 760 ants/min compared to 180 ants/min for the Tai chimpanzees.

Some chimpanzees use tools to hunt large bees (Xylocopa sp.) which make nests in dead branches on the ground or in trees. To get to the grubs and the honey, the chimpanzee first tests for the presence of adults by probing the nest entrance with a stick. If present, adult bees block the entrance with their abdomens, ready to sting. The chimpanzee then disables them with the stick to make them fall out and eats them rapidly. Afterwards, the chimpanzee opens the branch with its teeth to obtain the grubs and the honey.

Chimpanzees have been observed using a pair of tools to accomplish a task: a stick to dig into an ant nest and a "brush" made from grass stems with their teeth to collect the ants.

==== Collecting honey ====
Chimpanzees eat honey of four bee species. Groups of chimpanzees fish with sticks for the honey after having tried to remove what they can with their hands. They usually extract with their hands honeycombs from undisturbed hives of honey bees and run away from the bees to quietly eat their catch. In contrast, hives that have already been disturbed, either through the falling of the tree or because of the intervention of other predators, are cleaned of the remaining honey with fishing tools.

==== Processing food ====
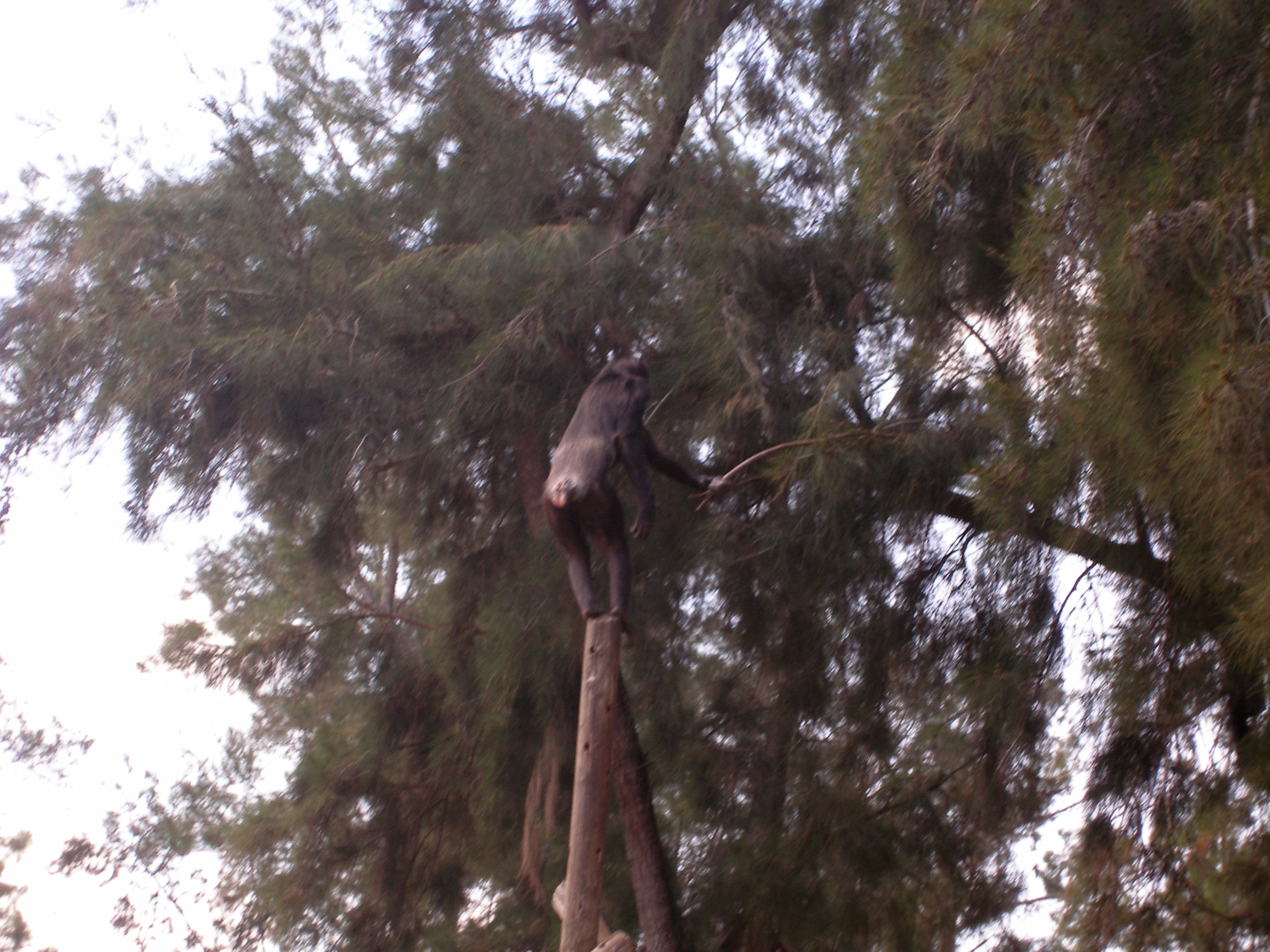
A chimpanzee gathering food with a stick

Tai chimpanzees crack open nuts with rocks, but there is no record of Gombe chimpanzees using rocks in this way. After opening nuts by pounding with a hammer, parts of the kernels may be too difficult to reach with the teeth or fingernails, and some individuals use sticks to remove these remains, instead of pounding the nut further with the hammer as other individuals do: a relatively rare combination of using two different tools. Hammers for opening nuts may be either wood or stone.

==== Collecting water ====
When chimpanzees cannot reach water that has formed in hollows high up inside trees, they have been observed taking a handful of leaves, chewing them, and dipping this "sponge" into the pool to suck out the water. Both bonobos and chimpanzees have also been observed making "sponges" out of leaves and moss that suck up water and are used as grooming tools.

=== Gorillas ===
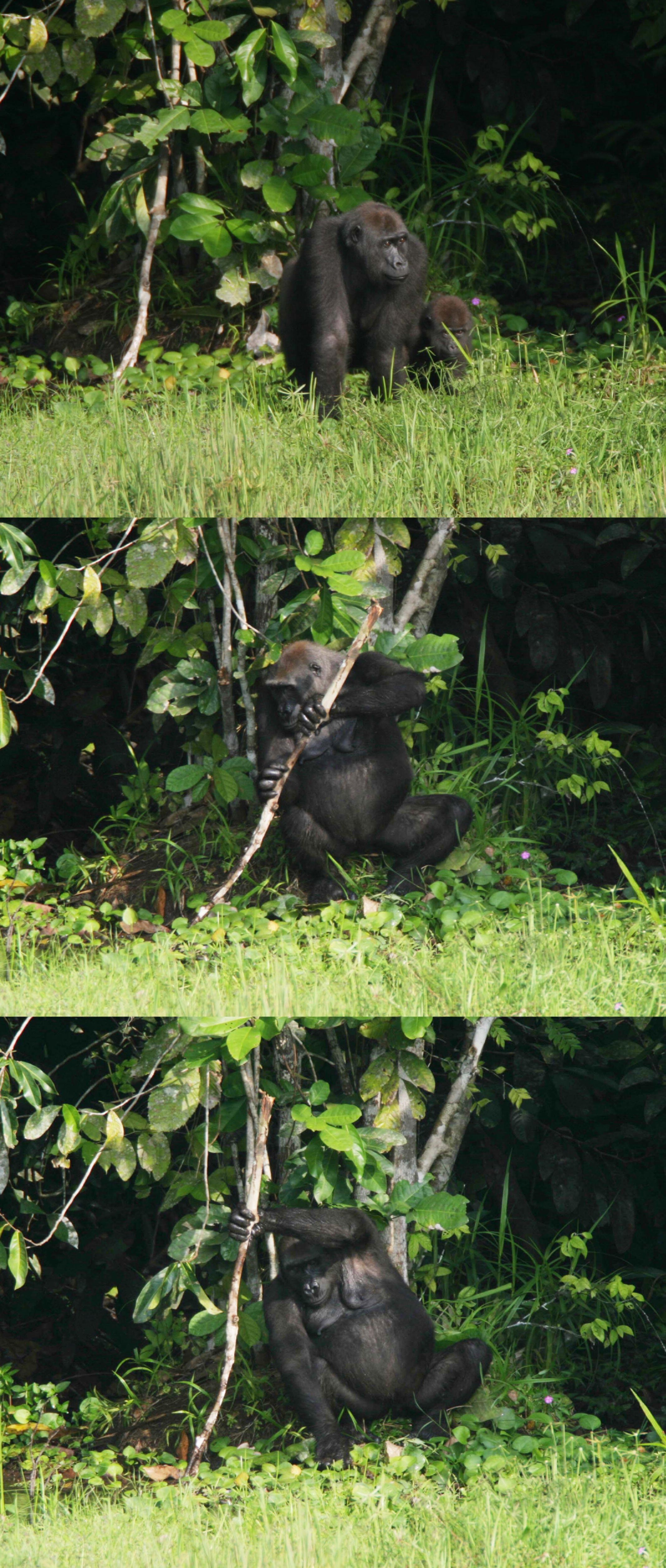
A gorilla pushing a stick into the ground and using it as a stabilising stick while dredging aquatic herbs

There are few reports of gorillas using tools in the wild. Western lowland gorillas have been observed using sticks to apparently measure the depth of water and as "walking sticks" to support their posture when crossing deeper water. An adult female used a detached trunk from a small shrub as a stabiliser during food gathering, and another used a log as a bridge. One possible explanation for the absence of observed tool use in wild gorillas is that they are less dependent on foraging techniques that require the use of tools, since they exploit food resources differently from chimpanzees. Whereas chimpanzees and orangutans feeding involves tools such as hammers to crack open nuts and sticks to fish for termites, gorillas access these foods by breaking nuts with their teeth and smashing termite mounds with their hands.

Captive western lowland gorillas have been observed to threaten each other with sticks and larger pieces of wood, while others use sticks for hygienic purposes. Some females have attempted to use logs as ladders. In another group of captive gorillas, several individuals were observed throwing sticks and branches into a tree, apparently to knock down leaves and seeds. Gorillas at Prague Zoo have used tools in several ways, including using wood wool as "slippers" when walking on the snow or to cross a wet section of the floor.

=== Orangutans ===
Orangutans were first observed using tools in the wild in 1994 in the northwest corner of Sumatra. As with the chimpanzees, orangutans use tools made from branches and leaves to scratch, scrape, wipe, sponge, swat, fan, hook, probe, scoop, pry, chisel, hammer, cover, cushion and amplify. They will break off a tree branch that is about 30 cm long, snap off the twigs, fray one end and then use the stick to dig in tree holes for termites. Sumatran orangutans use a variety of tools—up to 54 types for extracting insects or honey, and as many as 20 types for opening or preparing fruits such as the hard to access Neesia malayana. They also use an 'autoerotic tool'—a stick which they use to stimulate the genitals and masturbate (both male and female). There have been reports that individuals in both captivity and in the wild use tools held between the lips or teeth, rather than in the hands. In captivity, orangutans have been taught to chip stone to make and use Oldowan tools.

Orangutans living in Borneo scavenge fish that wash up along the shore and scoop catfish out of small ponds for fresh meals. Over two years, anthropologist Anne Russon observed orangutans learning to jab sticks at catfish to scare them out of the ponds and in to their waiting hands. Although orangutans usually fished alone, Russon observed pairs of apes catching catfish on a few occasions. On the island of Kaja in Borneo, a male orangutan was observed using a pole apparently trying to spear or bludgeon fish. This individual had seen humans fishing with spears. Although not successful, he was later able to improvise by using the pole to catch fish already trapped in the locals' fishing lines.

Sumatran orangutans use sticks to acquire seeds from a particular fruit. When the fruit of the Neesia tree ripens, its hard, ridged husk softens until it falls open. Inside are seeds that are highly desirable to the orangutans, but they are surrounded by fibreglass-like hairs that are painful if eaten. A Neesia-eating orangutan will select a 12 cm stick, strip off the bark, and then carefully collect the hairs with it. Once the fruit is safe, the ape will eat the seeds using the stick or its fingers. Sumatran orangutans will use a stick to poke a bees' nest wall, move it around and catch the honey.

Orangutans have been observed using sticks to apparently measure the depth of water. It has been reported that orangutans use tools for a wide range of purposes including using leaves as protective gloves or napkins, using leafy branches to swat insects or gather water, and building sun or rain covers above the nests used for resting. It has been reported that a Sumatran orangutan used a large leaf as an umbrella in a tropical rainstorm.

Orangutans produce an alarm call known as a "kiss squeak" when they encounter a predator like a snake. Sometimes, orangutans will strip leaves from a branch and hold them in front of their mouth when making the sound. It has been found this lowers the maximum frequency of the sound i.e. makes it deeper, and in addition, smaller orangutans are more likely to use the leaves. It has been suggested they use the leaves to make themselves sound bigger than they really are, the first documented case of an animal using a tool to manipulate sound.

=== Monkeys ===
Tool use has been observed in at least 32 monkey species including individuals that are captive, free, and semi-free range. These observations entail established, long term use of tools such as baboons using items to hit humans as well as more elusive, rare use like the howler monkeys' use of leaves to treat wounds. Use is further nuanced by if a species uses objects they have found or objects that they have modified. Of the 32 species that exhibit tool use, 11 of these exhibit object modification to make tools.

Species	Type and Extent of Tool Use	References
Red howler monkey (Alouatta seniculus)	Anecdotal evidence of a free individual using tools to be aggressive towards another	Richard-Hansen et al., 1998
Geoffroy's spider monkey (Ateles geoffroyi)	Multiple recorded observations of free individuals using tools for physical maintenance	Campbell, 2000; Rodriguez & Lindshield, 2007
White-fronted capuchin (Cebus albifrons)	Multiple recorded observations of free individuals using tools for food transportation	Phillips, 1998
Brown capuchin (Sapajus apella	Extensive observations of tool use including: captive, free, and semi free individuals extracting food with tools, captive individuals transporting food with a tool, and captive individuals to be aggressive towards another	Cooper & Harlow, 1961; Izawa & Mizuno, 1977; Strusaker & Leland, 1977; Antinucci & Visalberghi, 1986; Visalberghi, 1990, 1993; Fernandes, 1991; Anderson & Henneman, 1994; Westergaard & Suomi, 1994, 1995; Westergaard et al., 1995; Lavallee, 1999; Boinski et al., 2000; Cleveland et al., 2004; de A. Moura & Lee, 2004; Ottoni & Mannu, 2001; Ottoni et al., 2005; Schrauf et al., 2008
White-faced capuchin (Cebus capucinus)	Multiple accounts of free individuals using tools to extract food, maintain their physical self, defend against predation, and to be aggressive towards another	Bierens de Haan, 1931; Boinski, 1988; Chevalier-Skolnikoff, 1990; Baker, 1996
Black-striped capuchin (Sapajus libidinosus)	Multiple accounts of free individuals using tools to prepare and extract food and to perform physical maintenance.	Fragaszy et al., 2004; Waga et al., 2006; Visalberghi et al., 2007; Mannu & Ottoni, 2009
Wedge-capped capuchin (Cebus olivaceus)	Multiple accounts of free individuals using tools to perform physical maintenance.	Valderrama et al., 2000
Golden-bellied capuchin (Sapajus xanthosternus)	Multiple accounts of free individuals using tools to extract food	Canale et al., 2009
Sooty mangabey (Cercocebus atys)	Multiple accounts of captive individuals using tools to perform physical maintenance	Galat-Luong, 1984; Kyes, 1988
Agile mangabey (Cercocebus agilis)	Anecdotal evidence of a captive individual using tools to capture food	Guillaume & Meyerson, 1934
Red-tailed monkey (Cercopithecus ascanius)	Anecdotal evidence of a free individual using tools to perform physical maintenance	Worch, 2001
Vervet Monkey (Cercopithecus aethiops)	Multiple accounts of captive individuals using tools to capture food and perform physical maintenance	Galat-Luong, 1984; Pollack, 1998; Santos et al., 2006
Lowe's mona monkey (Cercopithecus campbelli)	Anecdotal evidence of a captive individual using a tool to perform physical maintenance.	Galat-Luong, 1984
Western red colobus (Colobus badius)	Multiple accounts of free individuals using tools to be aggressive towards another	Struhsaker, 1975; Starin. 1990
Common patas monkey (Erythrocebus patas)	Anecdotal evidence of a captive individual using tools to capture food	Gatinot, 1974
Long-tailed macaque (Macaca fascicularis)	Multiple accounts of semi free and free individuals using tools to prepare food, free individuals using tools to extract food and perform physical maintenance, and captive individuals transporting and capturing food and performing physical maintenance and other tasks	Carpenter, 1887; Chiang, 1967; Karrer, 1970; Artaud & Bertrand, 1984; Zuberbühler et al., 1996; Malaivijitnond et al., 2007; Watanabe et al., 2007; Masataka et al., 2009; Gumert et al., 2009
Japanese macaque (Macaca fuscata)	Multiple accounts of free individuals using tools to prepare and extract food and captive individuals capturing food	Kawai, 1965; Tokida et al., 1994; Hihara et al., 2003
Rhesus macaque (Macaca mulatta)	Multiple accounts of captive individuals preparing, transporting, and capturing food with tools	Shepherd, 1910; Hobhouse, 1926; Parks & Novak, 1993; Erwin, 1974
Pig-tailed macaque (Macaca nemestrina)	Multiple accounts of captive individuals using tools to capture food and perform physical maintenance	Beck, 1976
Sulawesi crested macaque (Macaca nigra)	Anecdotal evidence of captive individuals using tools to extract food	Babitz, 2000
Bonnet macaque (Macaca radiata)	Anecdotal evidence of free individuals using tools to perform physical maintenance	Sinah, 1997
Lion-tailed macaque (Macaca silenus)	Multiple accounts of free individuals using tools to prepare food, captive individuals to extract and transport food, and semi free individuals to transport food	Hohmann, 1988; Westergaard, 1988; Fitch-Snyder & Carter, 1993; Kumar et al., 2008
Tonkean macaque (Macaca tonkeana)	Multiple accounts of captive individuals using tools to extract food and perform physical maintenance, and semi free individuals using tools to capture food	Bayart, 1982; Anderson, 1985; Ueno & Fujita, 1998; Ducoing & Thierry, 2005
Drill (Mandrillus leucophaeus)	Anecdotal evidence of captive individuals using tools to perform physical maintenance	Armbruster, 1921; Galat-Luong, 1984
Mandrill (Mandrillus sphinx)	Anecdotal evidence of captive individuals using tools	Schultz 1961
Olive baboon (Papio anubis)	Multiple accounts of free individuals preparing, extracting, to be aggressive towards another, and performing physical maintenance with tools and of captive individuals using tools to capture food	van Lawick-Goodall et al., 1973; Pettet, 1975; Pickford, 1975; Benhar & Samuel, 1978; Oyen, 1979; Westergaard, 1992, 1993
Yellow baboon (Papio cynocephalus)	Anecdotal evidence of captive individuals using tools to capture food	Nellman & Trendelenburg, 1926
Hamadryas baboon (Papio hamadryas)	Multiple accounts of captive individuals using tools to capture food	Beck, 1972, 1973
Guinea baboon (Papio papio)	Multiple accounts of captive individuals using tools to capture food	Beck, 1973b; Petit & Thierry, 1993
Chacma baboon (Papio ursinus)	Multiple accounts of free individuals using tools to extract food and to be aggressive towards another and of captive individuals capturing food	Bolwig, 1961; Marais, 1969; Hamilton III et al., 1975
Silvered leaf monkey (Trachypithecus cristatus)	Multiple accounts of free individuals using tools to be aggressive towards another	Lydekker, 1910

In a captive environment, capuchins readily insert a stick into a tube containing viscous food that clings to the stick, which they then extract and lick. Capuchins also use a stick to push food from the centre of a tube retrieving the food when it reaches the far end, and as a rake to sweep objects or food toward themselves. The black-striped capuchin (Sapajus libidinosus) was the first non-ape primate for which tool use was documented in the wild; individuals were observed cracking nuts by placing them on a stone anvil and hitting them with another large stone (hammer). Similar hammer-and-anvil use has been observed in other wild capuchins including robust capuchin monkeys (genus Sapajus) It may take a capuchin up to 8 years to master this skill. The monkeys often transport hard fruits, stones, nuts and even oysters to an anvil for this purpose. Capuchins also use stones as digging tools for probing the substrate and sometimes for excavating tubers. Wild black-striped capuchin use sticks to flush prey from inside rock crevices. Robust capuchins are also known to sometimes rub defensive secretions from arthropods over their bodies before eating them; such secretions are believed to act as natural insecticides.

Baboons have also exhibited extensive tool use, seen within research on the chacma baboon (Papio ursinus) troops living on the desert floor of the Kuiseb Canyon in South West Africa. These baboons intentionally dropped stones over cliffs. Researchers have seen other types of tool use such as raking with tools and the use of barrels to climb in baboons.

Scientists have observed mandrills to modify and then use tools within captive environments.

In long-tailed macaques, tool use has been extensively observed, particularly within foraging and grooming habits. These tools have both been synthetic and organic in origin and their use varies greatly depending on populations. The research done within these populations and their tool use has been used to draw conclusions that high levels of sensorimotor intelligence help evolve innovative tool use.

== Aspects ==
=== Limitations ===
Tools used by nonhuman primates are limited in their complexity. Unlike human tools, which increase in complexity as they are passed down, nonhuman primate tools may be restricted to what has been dubbed "zones of latent solutions" (ZLS) - that is, the range of tools and techniques that can be developed independently by a species. Tools within this zone can be individually and socially learned, but tools outside this zone cannot. This renders non-human primates unable to develop tools beyond this zone, towards levels of human technology.

According to the ZLS hypothesis, every primate possesses a zone of solutions to ecological problems that can develop in interaction with a given environment, known as their zone of latent solutions. This package of skills fits the primate's environment; it contains packages of potential solutions that can be realised within the primate's existing and potential behaviour. Tool use within this zone can likewise be expressed via genetic predispositions, through trial and error learning, and all this may be triggered by social learning - but this social learning does not transfer the skills themselves, as in humans. All this may lead some to the conclusion that all primates have a human-like capacity to copy abilities to make and/or use complex tools from each other. However, nonhuman primate tool use is likely constrained to those tools within each species' zone of latent solutions - unless human training expands this zone.

For example, every chimpanzee has the capacity to learn how to use sticks to capture and consume ants. This behaviour is likely in the chimpanzees' ZLS, and therefore belong to every chimpanzee's potential biological toolkit. Yet, many may require a social "push", i.e. a trigger, before they themselves develop this behaviour individually. However, chimpanzees, and every other great ape, seem to be unable to learn tool use behaviour outside of their ZLS - i.e. in cases where a behaviour would not just be triggered, but copied. For example, in a 2009 experiment no species of great ape apart from humans (including chimpanzees, gorillas and orangutans) were able to spontaneously bend a flexible strip into a loop to hook and retrieve an otherwise unreachable object, under any condition, even with human teaching. Since loops fall securely outside of great apes' ZLS—perhaps as there was never any use for this behaviour in their ecological environment—this behaviour is unable to be learned socially by non-human primates.

=== Role of culture ===
Humans navigate the material world through the lens of cultural learning. Cultural learning is defined as high-complexity social learning, where tools and behaviours are invented on top of previous inventions which have previously been copied and taught - leading to cultural refinement across generations via the so-called cultural ratchet effect. As cultural animals, we regularly invent new tools based on our acquired cultural background, we may pay attention to specific models, such as the most successful individuals (and various other social learning biases), and in this way the best tool practices may increase in frequency and stick around in our collective repertoire until better designed ones are built on top. This cultural learning allows human tool complexity and efficiency to "ratchet up" through cultural generations, building tools of increased complexity over time, which allows the products (behaviours and/or artefacts) to accumulate over time in a process known as "cumulative culture." Nonhuman primate tools, contrarily, are unable to ratchet up in complexity over time as these animals do not copy tool design that they themselves could not have independently created from scratch, and therefore primates other than humans are restricted to those tools that reside within their zone(s) of latent solutions.

While human tools and technologies currently still increase in complexity at an exponential rate, for instance evolving from stone tools to rocket ships and supercomputers within a few thousand years, nonhuman primate tools show little evidence of improvement or underlying technological change in their underlying know-how across generations. For example, archaeological evidence indicates that the basic chimpanzee nut-cracking know-how has been static for at least the past 4300 years. This consistency and stasis in tool behaviour suggests that chimpanzee tools are not refined or improved across generations with a ratcheting-up effect, but rather reinvented by every single chimpanzee generation. That is, non-human primates must "re-invent the wheel" at every generation anew.

Humans differ from nonhuman primates in how they perceive tools and their underlying know-how. Humans, as a cultural species, are predisposed to copy the know-how (methods, relationships and processes) behind tools, while our nonhuman primate relatives are predisposed to instead individually innovate their tools from scratch or to be merely socially triggered to re-innovate the tools used by others (who, ultimately had to innovate them from scratch). For example, when both human children and chimpanzees (both aged 2–4 years) are shown solutions to open a box with observably unnecessary steps involved, human children consistently copy even the unnecessary steps, while chimpanzees bypass unnecessary steps and go straightforwardly to their natural tendencies of engaging with the box, such as using a stick to poke it. This difference between chimpanzees and humans suggests that chimpanzees tend to see tools through the lens of their own individual approaches, while humans tend to see tools through the lens of the underlying know-how, even where their own tendencies mismatch the observed know-how. Nonhuman primates are predisposed to re-innovate technologies that already exist in their zone of latent solutions, while, as a cumulative cultural species, humans learn know-how culturally that clearly is beyond the human zone of latent solutions. Over time, and across generations, this has led humans to have culturally created billions of know-how types, with the vast majority being beyond the human zone of latent solutions. Other apes, in contrast, seem to draw from a range of know-how that counts in mere thousands.

While humans and nonhuman primates are both tool users, both their expression and their capacities for tool use are vastly different. The zone(s) of latent solutions of nonhuman primates, and the cultural ratcheting-up of human technology rest on different underlying processes with vastly different capacities for complexity and improvement over time. While humans copy know-how that is supraindividual, other primates do not. It is currently unclear whether the zone of latent solutions approach is restricted to non-human primates, or whether it may also help explain tool use in many (or all) other animals. One step towards determining whether other animals' tool use is likely based on latent solutions or is instead due to cultural evolution of know-how is to determine - for each species examined - whether similar tool use exists in more than one population of the same species, where these populations are culturally unconnected (the so-called "method of local restriction".)
