= Economics: Principles, Problems, and Policies =

Textbook

- Seventh edition
- Author: Campbell R. McConnell, Stanley L. Brue, Sean M. Flynn
- Language: English
- Subject: Economics
- Genre: textbook
- Publisher: McGraw-Hill
- Publication date: 1960

Economics: Principles, Problems, and Policies is a textbook that is an integrated learning system for schoolchildren and students enrolled in economic specialties. It was first published in 1960 and, as of 2021, has released 22 editions. The authors of the modern textbook are American economics professors C. R. McConnell, S. L. Brue and S. M. Flynn.

== Edition history ==
The first edition of the book was published in 1960. Until the 10th edition, the author was Campbell R. McConnell, professor of economics at the University of Nebraska, Lincoln, and since the 11th edition, which was published in 1990, Stanley L. Brue, a professor of economics, has become a co-author. Starting with the 18th edition, which was published in 2009, Professor of Economics Sean Masaki Flynn becomes the third co-author of the textbook.

The twenty-second edition was published in 2021.

== Translations ==
Starting from the 11th edition, the textbook is translated into Russian. The decision to transfer was made by the Soviet government in 1990. For 2 years, the book was translated by 8 economists under the guidance of Professor of Moscow State University Anatoly Porokhovsky and became a basic textbook in Russian universities.

The translation of the last twenty-first edition was published by the Infra-M publishing house in October 2019

=== Reviews ===
Economist V. M. Galperin in his review «Economics, that is, economic science», published in the journal «Economic School», and timed to the publication of the first edition of the book in Russian, criticized the translation of its title.

According to the publishing house «Republic», the textbook is one of the most popular in American colleges and universities. The book is popularly written, which makes it accessible to the layman.

According to Amazon.com, the textbook authors have set the standard for quality content for teachers and students around the world. And the tutorial itself, starting from the 19th edition, was supplied with the LearnSmart application. The textbook becomes an integrated learning system, allowing students to gain knowledge more effectively.

According to the publishing house «Infra-M» in the majority of Russian economic universities, the textbook is used in the educational process as a basic one, recommended by the Ministry of Education and Science of the Russian Federation for university students studying in economic specialties. The textbook is devoted to the problems of economics: macro and microeconomics, national income, employment, credit, financial and tax policy, world economy and others.
