= Ministry of Economics =

Ministry of Economics may refer to:

- Ministry of Economics (Latvia), a ministry in Latvia
- Ministry of Economics and Finance (France), a ministry in France since 1958
- Ministry of Economics (Sweden), a ministry in Sweden between 1976 and 1982
