= Econ Engineering =

British vehicle manufacturing company

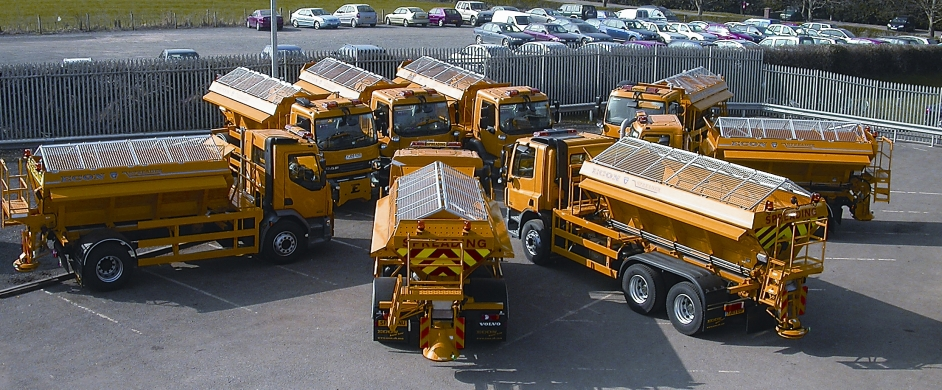
- Type: Limited company
- Industry: Commercial vehicle body builders
- Founded: 1959, Otley, West Yorkshire
- Headquarters: Ripon, North Yorkshire, UK
- Products: Salt spreaders, Road Menders, Tippers, Unibodies, Hotboxes
- Number of employees: 200+
- Website: www.econ.uk.com

Econ Engineering Limited is the UK's largest manufacturer of winter and road maintenance vehicle bodies, founded as a supplier of agricultural equipment under the name of Agriquipment Ltd on 9 December 1959 by W. George Lupton in Otley, West Yorkshire. As of December 2021, they produce more than 85 per cent of the UK's winter service vehicles, leasing them to councils and highway authorities.

The first Econ prototype salt spreader was finished in 1970 and the machines were launched at the 1972 IWM exhibition in Torquay. The name Econ comes from a Bradford-based company who manufactured industrial heating units called “Econoheat” bought by WG Lupton to balance production whilst developing the salt spreaders.

Econ Engineering manufacture all of their machinery at a custom-built site on the outskirts of Ripon, North Yorkshire, constructed in 1980. In January 2022, Econ reported a turnover of over £40m, boosted by continued investment in the business including satellite facilities in Alloa, Scotland and Cardiff, Wales. This was followed by the opening of a new service site in Sowerby, Thirsk in April 2022. Equipped with 24 service bays, the site cost £7m, with Highways Magazine calling it 'a tour de force of productive investment'. Sustainability was a priority at the site, which has 114 solar panels, LED motion-sensored lighting and a water recycling system.

== History ==
- 1959: Agriquipment Ltd was founded by WG Lupton on 9 December in Otley, West Yorkshire.
- 1961: Patent granted for the world's first flail mower designed by WG Lupton.
- 1965: Agriquipment Ltd was sold to the Oliver Rix Group and production was moved to AC Bamlett in Thirsk.
- 1966: The Lupat Flail Mower goes into production at AC Bamlett and continues until 1969.
- 1969: WG Lupton parts ways with the Oliver Rix Group to found Econ Engineering Ltd based at an old vaux brewery site in Ripon. The Lupat Flail Mower was re-purchased from Oliver Rix and production moved to Econ in Ripon.
- 1970: The first Econ prototype salt spreader was built.
- 1972: The salt spreaders are launched at the IWM exhibition in Torquay.
- 1975: Econ introduce road speed related spreading to discharge salt at the same rate irrespective of travelling speed.
- 1979: Planning was secured for a new purpose-built factory on the outskirts of Ripon.
- 1981: Econ bought Atkin's of Clitheroe (then the largest UK spreader manufacturer) from the Cammell Laird Group.
- 1984–1986: The acquisition and merger of Spencer's of Market Harborough and Acklift of Southwell saw the creation of a street lighting division, the addition of Taskers of Andover, Taylors of Consett, Lister Farm Machinery and L&K Sprayers create a burgeoning agricultural division.
- Late 1980s: The agricultural and powered access divisions are dismantled and sold off following the 1980s boom and bust.
- 1991: The Hot Box highway maintenance equipment is released.
- 1993: Econ QCB system is developed and launched.
- 1994: Unibody multipurpose body and salt spreader is released. Econ leaves the agricultural market completely and continues in the highway and winter maintenance sector.
- 1995: Pre Wet spreader is released.
- 1996: The Low Throw spreader is released for urban spreading.
- 2003: The Econ factory site was expanded to include a large refurbishment centre at the north of the site.
- 2004: Econ installs the most advanced paint facility in England to increase anti-corrosion performance. SPARGO control system goes into production allowing remote salt-spreading adjustment on the move.
- 2005: The acquisition of MHS's hire fleet doubles the size of the Econ fleet to 160 units.
- 2008: SPARGO IS goes into development, an electronics GPS control unit that allows sat nav style route directions and preplanned automatically varying salt spreading patterns.
- 2026: Econ Engineering is purchased by the American company Alamo Group for a reported £120m
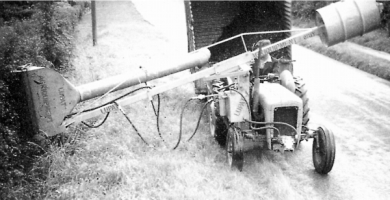
The first hedge trimmer built by George Lupton, founder of Lupat (later Econ Engineering)

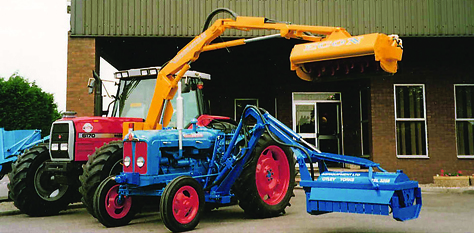
Econ Hedgemaster model HM3E (built 1996) and original Lupat Vergemaster (built 1960)

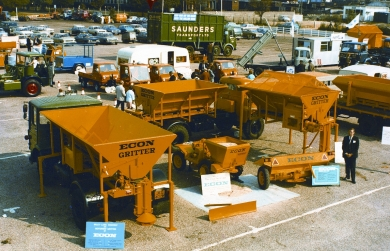
Econ prototype spreaders at the 1972 IWM exhibition in Torquay

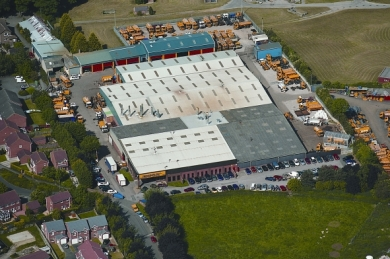
Econ Factory, Ripon N'Yorkshire (2007)

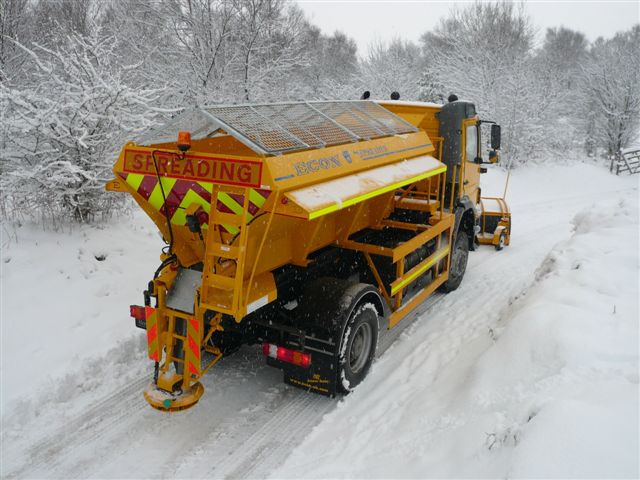
Econ Salt Spreader in use (winter 2009–2010)
