= Economy (disambiguation) =

An economy is an area of the production, distribution, or trade, and consumption of goods and services by different agents in a given geographical location in various countries

Economy may also refer to:

== Finance and economics ==
- Economy, or frugality, the quality of being efficient or frugal in using resources;
- Economies of scale, a firm's average cost savings from greater output
- Virtual economy, an economy simulated in a virtual world
- World economy, the economy of the world

== Places ==
- Economy, Arkansas, United States
- Economy, Indiana, United States
- Economy, Missouri, United States
- Economy, Nova Scotia, Maritime Canada
- Economy, Pennsylvania, United States
- Old Economy Village, Pennsylvania, United States

== People ==
- Elizabeth Economy (born 1962), American scholar and China-watcher

== Arts, entertainment, and media ==
- Economy (album), a 2011 album by John Mark McMillan
- Economy (Thoreau), a chapter from Henry David Thoreau's book Walden
- "Jazz ist anders" (Economy), the economy-version of Die Ärzte's album "Jazz ist anders"

== Religion ==
- Economy (religion), a bishop's discretionary power to relax rules
- Economy of Salvation, that part of divine revelation that deals with God's creation and management of the world, particularly His plan for salvation accomplished through the Church

== Other uses ==
- Economy (basketball), a basketball mathematical statistical formula
- Economy class (also called cattle class, scum class, standard class, or steerage class, as well as third class or fourth class on railways, or tourist class on ocean liners), the lowest travel class of seating in air, ferry, maritime, and rail travel
- Premium economy, a class of seating in airline travel

== See also ==
- Oikonomos
- Economic (cyclecar), a British three-wheeled cyclecar
- Economics (disambiguation)
