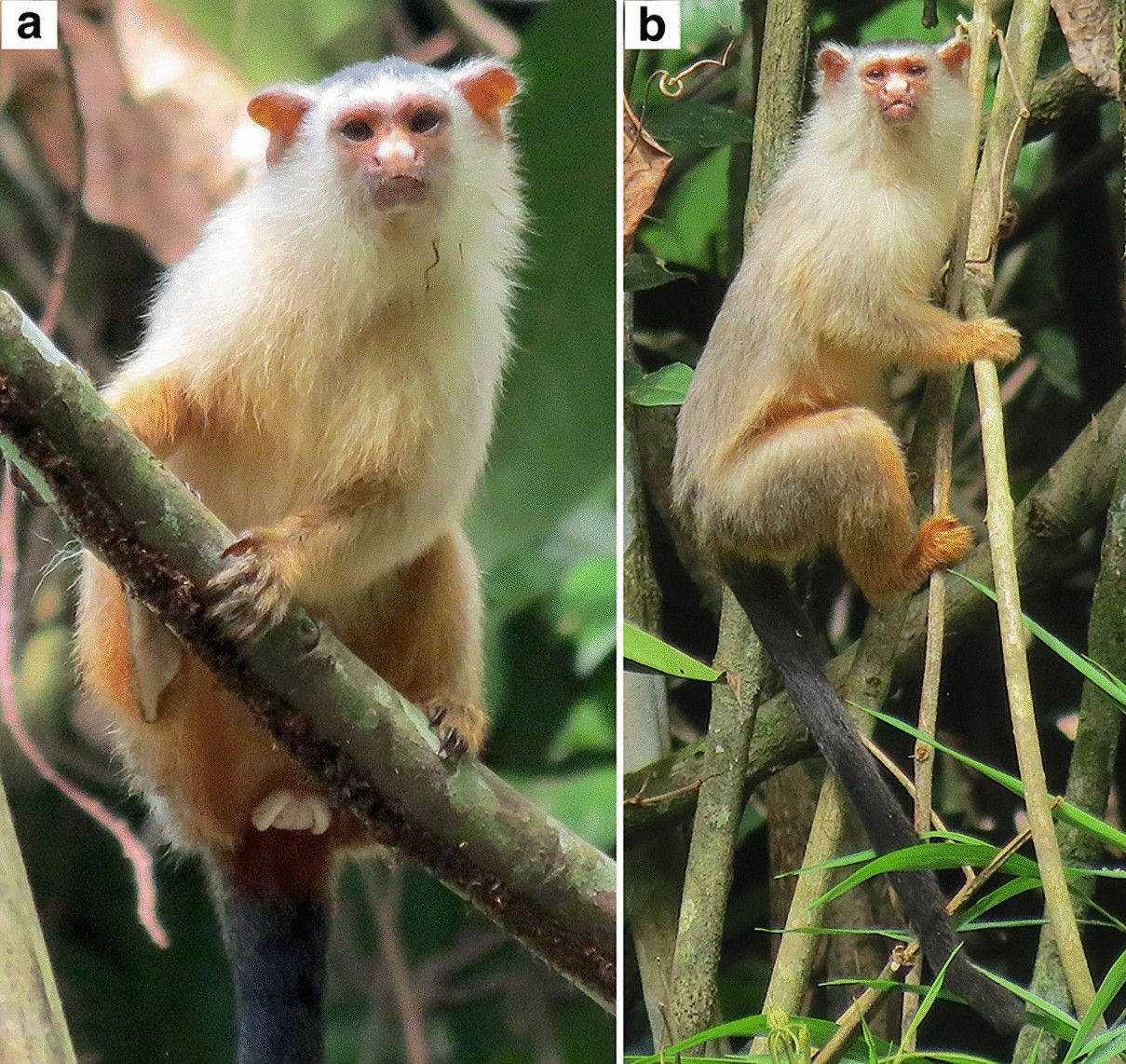
- Female (a) and male (b) in Paranaíta, Brazil

Conservation status
- Endangered (IUCN 3.1)

Scientific classification
- Kingdom: Animalia
- Phylum: Chordata
- Class: Mammalia
- Order: Primates
- Family: Callitrichidae
- Genus: Mico
- Species: M. schneideri

Binomial name
- Mico schneideri Costa-Araújo et al. 2021
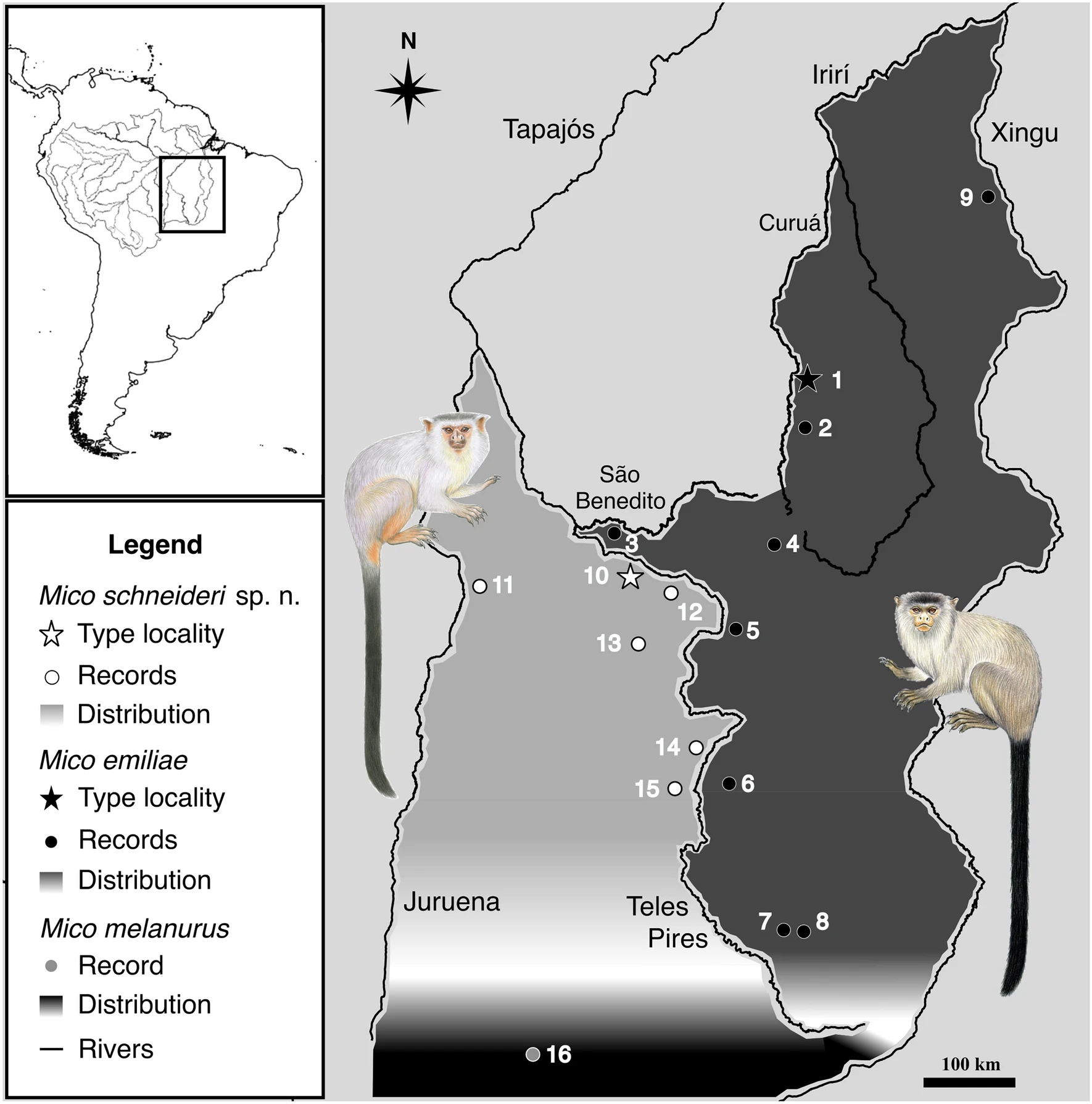
- Geographical distribution of Schneider's marmoset (silver) and Emilia's marmoset (dark grey)

= Schneider's marmoset =

Species of New World monkey

Schneider's marmoset (Mico schneideri) is a species of marmoset of the genus Mico in the family Callitrichidae. Endemic to Brazil, it is found in the Amazon rainforest of Mato Grosso state. It is found on the interfluve between the Juruena and Teles Pires rivers. Schneider's marmoset is found in primary and secondary terra firma rainforests and in the transition zone to the Cerrado.

Previously recognised as a population of Emilia's marmoset (Mico emiliae), a morphological and phylogenetic study in 2021 showed the species is distinct and it was formally described as a new species. Schneider's marmoset has a lead-coloured saddle and rump with cream-silver underparts. There is grey fur on the back of its neck and on top of its head. Its hands are light orange, its feet are orange, and its tail is black.

Schneider's marmoset is found in the "arc of deforestation", a 2,500 km (1,600 mi) stretch of the Amazon rainforest which is under greatest pressure from deforestation, mostly due to agricultural encroachment.

== Taxonomy and phylogeny ==
Described by Costa-Araújo et al. in 2021, Mico schneideri (Schneider's marmoset) was the third species split from Mico emiliae (Emilia's marmoset); M. marcai (Marca's marmoset) and M. rondoni (Rondon's marmoset) were separated from the taxon in 1993 and 2010, respectively. M. schneideri was named in honour of Horácio Schneider, a Brazilian biologist who was "a pioneer, and a major contributor to the phylogenetic studies of New World primates". The holotype is an adult female collected from a forest fragment in Paranaíta city in 2016. The description is partly based on eight specimens collected in 1995 from the Juruena–Teles Pires interfluve which were misidentified as M. emiliae and were kept in the Emílio Goeldi Museum in Belém. These specimens, together with other specimens collected in the same area between 2015 and 2018, were designated as the paratypes. Phylogenetic analyses revealed four lineages within Mico, and although M. schneideri had been labelled as M. emiliae for many years it is actually more closely related to M. melanurus (the black-tailed marmoset) and M. marcai (Marca's marmoset), its sister taxon.

== Physical description ==
Schneider's marmoset has a lead-coloured back and cream-silver underparts with light orange hues towards its arms and legs. It has short white hairs on its face and no ear tufts. On the back of its neck (mantle) and the top of its head (crown) it has grey fur. Like other marmosets, it has enlarged incisor teeth, which are the same size as the canine teeth, which are used for gouging holes in trees to extract exudates. Its reduced body size when compared to other New World monkeys has necessitated the loss of one set of molars, giving the dental formula of 2.1.3.22.1.3.2 × 2 = 32, meaning that on each side of the mouth there are two upper (maxillary) and lower (mandibular) incisors, one upper and lower canine tooth, three upper and lower premolars, and two upper and lower molars, giving a total of 32 permanent teeth. It has dark brown eyes. The tail is black, with some orange hairs on the underside of the base of the tail. The upper arms are gray to cream-colored, the tops of the hands are blackish-gold, while those of the feet are orange-gold. The hairless palms are gray to white, while the feet are unpigmented. The fingers and toes, with the exception of the big toe, which has a flat nail, have curved claws (tegulae). Although body measurements were not given in the scientific description, callitrichids have an average head-body length of 14–18 cm with a 25–32 cm tail and weigh 300–450 g.

== Distribution and habitat ==
Schneider's marmoset is found in primary and secondary terra firma rainforests and in the transition zone to the Cerrado. It is found in the northern Mato Grosso state in Brazil, on the interfluve between the Juruena and Teles Pires rivers, which limit its range to the west and east, respectively. Its distribution north is restricted by the confluence of the two rivers while its southerly distribution extends into their headwaters but does not reach the city of Lucas do Rio Verde. The southern limit of its range coincides with the start of the Cerrado biome where the forest gives way to savanna. Since it has not been found in Amazonian white-sand savanna vegetation, it is not expected to be found in the Cerrado.

== Conservation ==
Schneider's marmoset is found in the "arc of deforestation", a 2,500 km long strip on the southern periphery of the Amazon rainforest that is under greatest threat from deforestation and conversion to agricultural and pastoral environments. This area accounts for almost one-third of global deforestation and has experienced half of the global land use change over the past 30 years. It is thought that the current rates of deforestation in the area will lead to a tipping point of no return, replacing the forests with a non-forest ecosystem. There are 52 primate species found in the "arc of deforestation", 42 of which are already threatened with extinction.

== See also ==
- List of living mammal species described in the 2020s
- List of primates described in the 2020s
