= Anthony Rylands =

British primatologist (born 1950)

Anthony Brome Rylands
- Born: 1950 (age 75–76); Surrey, England
- Education: Imperial College London; University of Cambridge
- Known for: Research on Neotropical primates; conservation leadership
- Scientific career
- Fields: Primatology
- Workplaces: Instituto Nacional de Pesquisas da Amazônia; Universidade Federal de Minas Gerais; Conservation International

Anthony Brome Rylands (born 1950 in Surrey, England) is a British primatologist. His research focuses on neotropical primates.

He is regarded a pioneer and central figure in the fieldwork on South American primates and comprehensive evaluations of primate taxonomy.

== Biography ==
From 1964 to 1969, Rylands attended Radley College in Radley near Abingdon-on-Thames. Beginning in 1970, he studied for a B.Sc. in zoology at Imperial College London, graduating with honors in 1973. From July 1976 to March 1986, he worked as a research associate in the ecology department of the Instituto Nacional de Pesquisas da Amazônia (INPA) in Manaus, Amazonas, where he researched the biogeography, ecology, and behavior of the Aripuanã marmoset (Mico intermedius) in Mato Grosso, as well as the golden-headed lion tamarin (Leontopithecus chrysomelas) and Wied's marmoset (Callithrix kuhlii) in Bahia. These field studies formed the basis of his dissertation, The Behaviour and Ecology of Three Species of Marmosets and Tamarins (Callitrichidae, Primates) in Brazil, with which he earned a Ph.D. in behavioral ecology at the University of Cambridge in 1982. From 1983 to 1986, he coordinated the collaborative project Biological Dynamics of Forest Fragments between INPA and the WWF.

In 1986, Rylands joined the faculty of the Institute of Biological Sciences at the Federal University of Minas Gerais (UFMG), where he worked as Professor of Vertebrate Zoology from 1991 to 2005. There, he helped establish the first master's program in ecology, conservation, and wildlife management in Brazil. He supervised 23 master's and doctoral students and oversaw 60 graduate theses.

Since 1992, Rylands has collaborated with Conservation International, initially as a research associate with its Brazilian partner program. From 1999 to 2009, he was director of the Endangered Species Program at the newly founded Center for Applied Biodiversity Science in Washington, D.C. From 2000 to 2017, he led research groups at Conservation International, holding managerial roles with the Margot Marsh Biodiversity Foundation and the Primate Action Fund.

Rylands has been a member of the IUCN/Species Survival Commission’s Primate Specialist Group (PSG) since 1980 and its deputy chair since 1996. In 1993, he co-founded the PSG’s newsletter and journal Neotropical Primates, serving as co-editor until 2005. Since 1996, he has been co-editor of the journal Primate Conservation.

In 2000, Rylands was among the first describers of the Acarí marmoset (Mico acariensis).

== Awards ==
- SCC award, International Union for Conservation of Nature IUCN Species Survival Commission (2024)

== Publications ==
Rylands’ book publications include:

- The Status of Conservation Areas in the Brazilian Amazon (1991)
- Marmosets and Tamarins: Systematics, Behaviour, and Ecology (1993)
- Lion Tamarins: Biology and Conservation (2002)
- Monkeys of the Guianas: Guyana, Suriname, French Guiana: Pocket Identification Guide (2008, with Russell Mittermeier)
- South Asian Primates: Pocket Identification Guide (2008, with Russell Mittermeier)
- Indigenous Peoples and Conservation, From Rights to Resource Management (2010)
- Lémuriens de Madagascar (2014, with Olivier Langrand and Russell Mittermeier)
- Monkeys of Peru: Pocket Identification Guide (2015, with Laura K. Marsh and Russell Mittermeier)
- All the World’s Primates (2016, with Russell Mittermeier)
- Back from the Brink: 25 Conservation Success Stories (2017, with Russell Mittermeier)

In 2013, he co-edited, with Russell Mittermeier and Don E. Wilson, volume 3 of the Handbook of the Mammals of the World on primates, contributing family chapters on Callitrichidae, Cebidae, Pitheciidae, Atelidae, and Cercopithecidae. Since 2000, he has co-edited Primates in Peril: The World’s 25 Most Endangered Primates, a joint project of Conservation International and the IUCN/SSC Primate Specialist Group. In 2024, he co-authored Neotropical Primates, published by Lynx Edicions with Russell Mittermeier.

== Eponyms ==
In 2014, Laura K. Marsh named the primate species Pithecia rylandsi, a saki (Pithecia), in Rylands’ honor.
