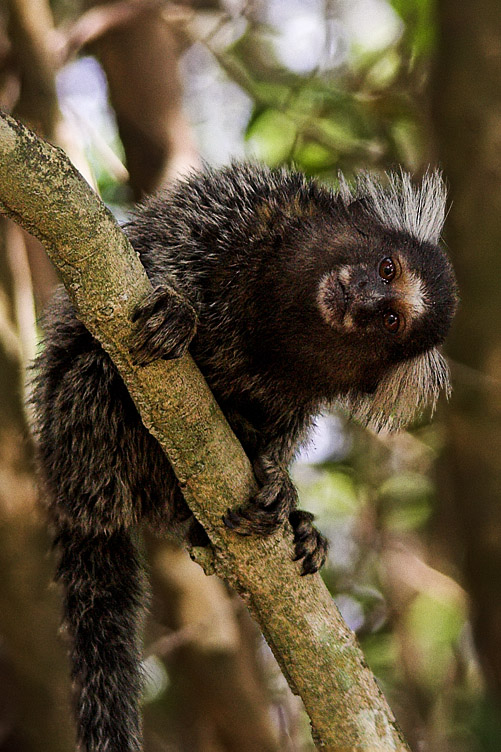
- Common marmoset (Callithrix jacchus) at Tibau do Sul, Rio Grande do Norte

Scientific classification
- Kingdom: Animalia
- Phylum: Chordata
- Class: Mammalia
- Order: Primates
- Parvorder: Platyrrhini
- Family: Callitrichidae

Groups included
- Callibella M.G.M. van Roosmalen & T. van Roosmalen, 2003 (Roosmalens' dwarf marmoset); Callimico Miranda-Ribeiro, 1922 (Goeldi's marmoset); Callithrix Erxleben, 1777 (Atlantic marmosets); Cebuella Gray, 1866 (pygmy marmosets); Mico Lesson, 1840 (Amazonian marmosets)

Cladistically included but traditionally excluded taxa
- Leontopithecus Lesson, 1840 (lion tamarins); Saguinus Hoffmannsegg, 1807 (tamarins)

= Marmoset =

Marmosets

Small South American monkeys

The marmosets (/ˈmɑːrməˌzɛts, -ˌsɛts/), also known as zaris or sagoin, are twenty-two New World monkey species of the genera Callithrix, Cebuella, Callibella, and Mico. All four genera are part of the biological family Callitrichidae. The term "marmoset" is also used in reference to Goeldi's marmoset, Callimico goeldii, which is closely related.

Most marmosets have a small body size, measuring about 20 cm (8 in) long and weighing around 100 - 350 g. Sexual maturity is quickly reached around 12 to 18 months and they can live up to 14 years old in the wild. Female marmosets have short gestational periods of around 145 days and can get pregnant 2-4 weeks after their previous delivery. Relative to other monkeys, they show some apparently primitive features; they have claws rather than nails, non-opposable thumbs, and tactile hairs on their wrists. They lack wisdom teeth, and their brain layout seems to be relatively primitive. They have long tails for balancing and communication, not for grasping or holding objects. Marmosets use scent-marking to mark their territories, sleeping areas, and to identify themselves to others. Their body temperature is unusually variable, changing by up to 4 °C (7.2 °F) in a day. Marmosets are native to South America and have been found in Bolivia, Brazil, Colombia, Ecuador, Paraguay, and Peru. They have also been occasionally spotted in Central America and southern Mexico. They are sometimes kept as pets, though they have specific dietary and habitat needs that require consideration.

According to recent research, marmosets exhibit germline chimerism, which is not known to occur in nature in any primates other than callitrichids. 95% of marmoset fraternal twins trade blood through chorionic fusions, making them hematopoietic chimeras.

== Species list ==
- Genus Callithrix—Atlantic marmosets
  - Common marmoset, Callithrix jacchus
  - Black-tufted marmoset, Callithrix penicillata
  - Wied's marmoset, Callithrix kuhlii
  - White-headed marmoset, Callithrix geoffroyi
  - Buffy-headed marmoset, Callithrix flaviceps
  - Buffy-tufted marmoset, Callithrix aurita
- Genus Mico—Amazonian marmosets
  - Rio Acari marmoset, Mico acariensis
  - Silvery marmoset, Mico argentatus
  - White marmoset, Mico leucippe
  - Emilia's marmoset, Mico emiliae
  - Black-headed marmoset, Mico nigriceps
  - Marca's marmoset, Mico marcai
  - Black-tailed marmoset, Mico melanura
  - Santarem marmoset, Mico humeralifer
  - Maués marmoset, Mico mauesi
  - Munduruku marmoset, Mico munduruku
  - Gold-and-white marmoset, Mico chrysoleucos
  - Hershkovitz's marmoset, Mico intermedius
  - Satéré marmoset, Mico saterei
  - Rondon's marmoset, Mico rondoni
- Genus Callibella—Roosmalens' dwarf marmoset
  - Roosmalens' dwarf marmoset, Callibella humilis
- Genus Cebuella—Pygmy Marmoset
  - Western pygmy marmoset, Cebuella pygmaea
  - Eastern pygmy marmoset, Cebuella niveiventris

== Behavior ==
Marmosets are highly active, living in the upper canopy of forest trees, and feeding on insects, fruit, leaves, tack, sap, and gum. They have strong upper and long, bent lower incisors, which allow them to chew holes in tree trunks and branches to harvest the gum inside; some species are specialized feeders on gum. This behavior is known as tree-gouging. It allows for better diet consumption. It is a daily activity that takes half a day for them. Their claws are another foraging adaptation skill to their trees-living life style.

Marmosets are social animals. They live in stable family groups of 3 to 15, consisting of one or two breeding females, an unrelated male, their offspring, and occasionally extended family members and unrelated individuals. Social hierarchy is seen in these family groups. Breeding pairs and one of the two breeding females are at the top of the hierarchy, followed by the rest of the family members that are determined and organized by age. The social hierarchy of marmosets can also be determined by scent and communication behaviors that include posture and verbal responses. Breeding female marmoset that is not dominant is considered lower rank and has a higher chance of successful mating with a male outside her family group. Their mating systems are highly variable and can include monogamy, polygyny, and polyandry. In most species, fraternal twins are usually born, but triplets are not unknown. Like other callitrichines, marmosets are characterized by a high degree of cooperative care of the young and some food sharing and tolerated theft. Adult males, females other than the mother, and older offspring participate in carrying infants. Father marmosets are an exceptionally attentive example of fathers within the animal kingdom, going as far as assisting their mates in giving birth, cleaning up afterbirth, carrying babies on their backs, and even biting the umbilical cords attaching their newborn offspring to their mothers. Most groups scent mark and defend the edges of their ranges, but whether they are truly territorial is unclear, as group home ranges greatly overlap.

The favorite food of marmosets is carbohydrate-rich tree sap, which they reach by gnawing holes in trunks, as well as insects and smaller animals. Their territories are centered on the trees that they regularly exploit in this way. The smaller marmosets venture into the very top of forest canopies to hunt insects that are abundant there.

Marmosets use chirps, trills, and "phee" calls to communicate with each other. "Phee" calls are long-distance vocalizations that help monkeys identify each other's locations. Marmosets have been observed to use distinctive "phee" calls for the different individuals in their group, similar to a human name.

== Research ==
Marmosets are greatly used in biology for several different studies. Marmosets show social bonding, behavioral functions, and feeding patterns similar to humans compared to other lab animals. In research, marmosets are safe to handle and maintenance is inexpensive. Their fast sexual maturity and short lifespan makes them suitable genetic models for research in neuroscience and geroscience. Studies on aging, brain disorders, and microbiome health are common research studies conducted on marmoset. Similarities in aging complications between marmosets and humans has been displayed from certain diseases developed like inflammatory and cardiovascular changes.
