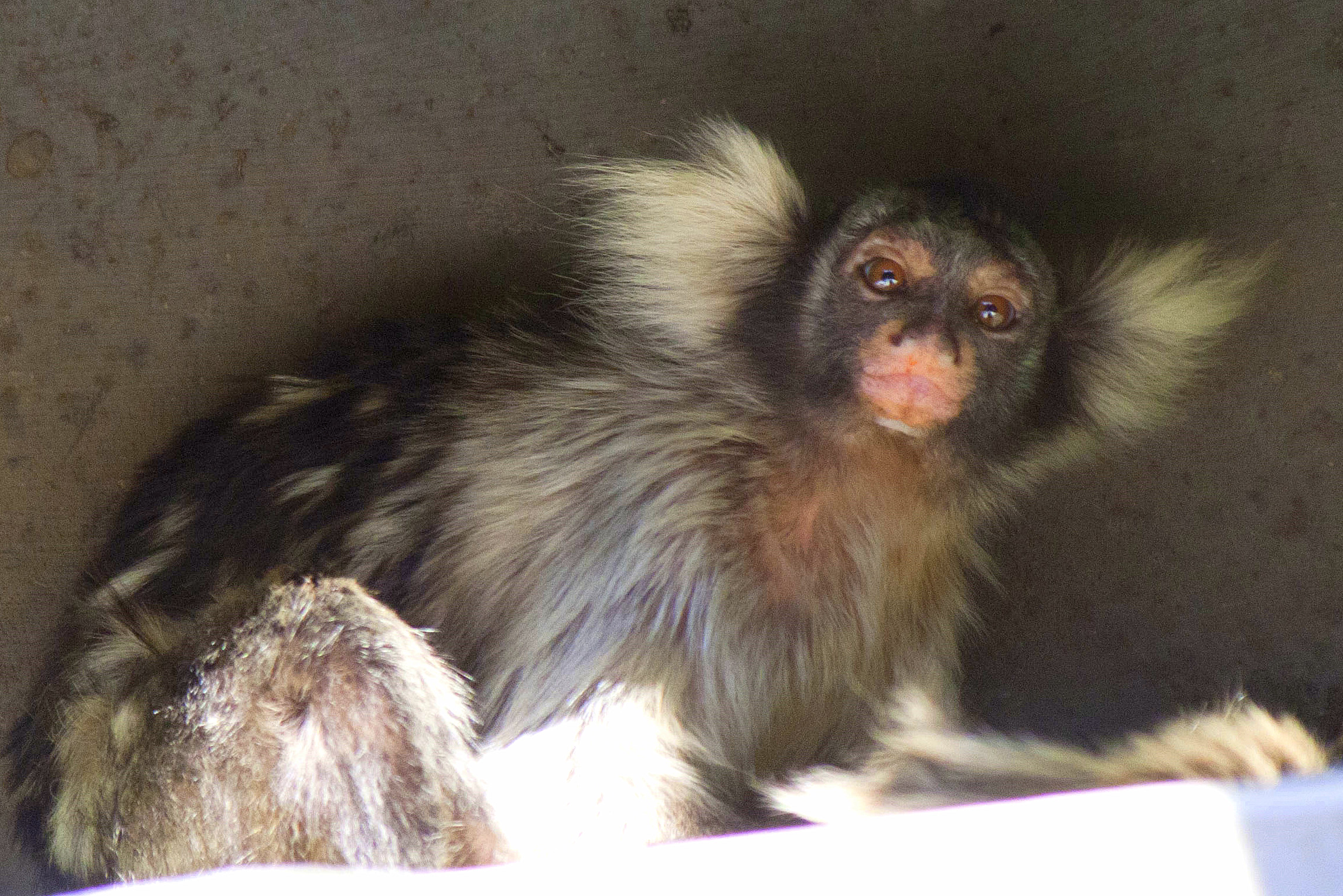

Conservation status
- Near Threatened (IUCN 3.1)

Scientific classification
- Kingdom: Animalia
- Phylum: Chordata
- Class: Mammalia
- Order: Primates
- Family: Callitrichidae
- Genus: Mico
- Species: M. humeralifer

Binomial name
- Mico humeralifer (É. Geoffroy, 1812)
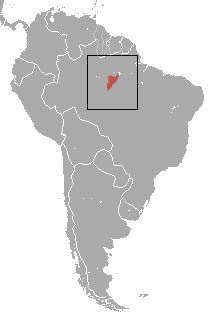
- Santarem marmoset range

Synonyms
- Hapale santaremensis Matschie, 1893; Callithrix humeralifera É. Geoffroy, 1812

= Santarem marmoset =

Santarém marmoset

Species of New World monkey

The Santarem marmoset (Mico humeralifer), also known as the black and white tassel-ear marmoset, is a marmoset endemic to the Brazilian states of Amazonas and Pará.

== Description ==
The Santarem marmoset is a small monkey, with a head-body length of 20 to 27 cm (7.9 to 10.6 in). Adults have been reported to weigh anything from 280 to 475 g (9.9 to 16.8 oz). Its physical form is similar to that of other marmosets, with lower canines that barely protrude above the line of the incisors and claws (rather than nails) on all of their digits except for the big toe. It most closely resembles the Maués marmoset in appearance, differing in having paler fur and in the shape of the ear tassels. Males and females are similar in size.

The scientific name "humeralifer" roughly translates as "wearing a shoulder cape" and refers to the mantle of light grey fur that covers the animal's shoulders. There are also patches of whitish fur on the hips, but otherwise the body is black with irregular grey spots over the back and flanks, and yellowish on the underparts. The limbs are black, apart from grey fur stretching down over the outer surface of the upper arms from the mantle. The non-prehensile tail is 31 to 37 cm (12 to 15 in) long and ringed with black and grey; all but one other species in the genus Mico lack these distinctive tail rings.

The face is dark in colour, with a greyish forehead and patches of pink skin around the eyes and mouth. The area around and between the eyes also has relatively little fur compared with other parts of the head and body. Like many marmosets, there are large tufts of fur on the ears, but the Santarem marmoset is one of only a few species in which the fur sprouts from both the outer and inner surfaces of the pinna. The tufts are buff to grey in colour and, as the alternative common name implies, have a tassel-like shape that extends sideways from the head.

== Distribution and habitat ==
The Santarem marmoset is found only in a very restricted area between the Tapajós river in the east, the lower Madeira and Roosevelt rivers in the west, and the Amazon River in the north. The southern limit of its range is unknown, but is likely to be in the general region of the Paracari River. There are no recognised subspecies. It inhabits lowland rainforest, and is common in secondary forest.

== Biology and behaviour ==
Like other members of its genus, the Santarem marmoset travels in the lower parts of the forest canopy, and feed primarily on fruit and insects, supplementing its diet with small lizards and frogs and with gum gouged from trees. They live in small family groups, with about six members being typical, although groups of up to fifteen individuals have been reported. They make long calls with their tongue vibrating rapidly, said to resemble the sound of a cricket, and also shorter chirps. Like most other marmosets, they normally give birth to non-identical twins twice per year. Juveniles are said to have black stripe along the head and hairy, but not tufted, ears.
