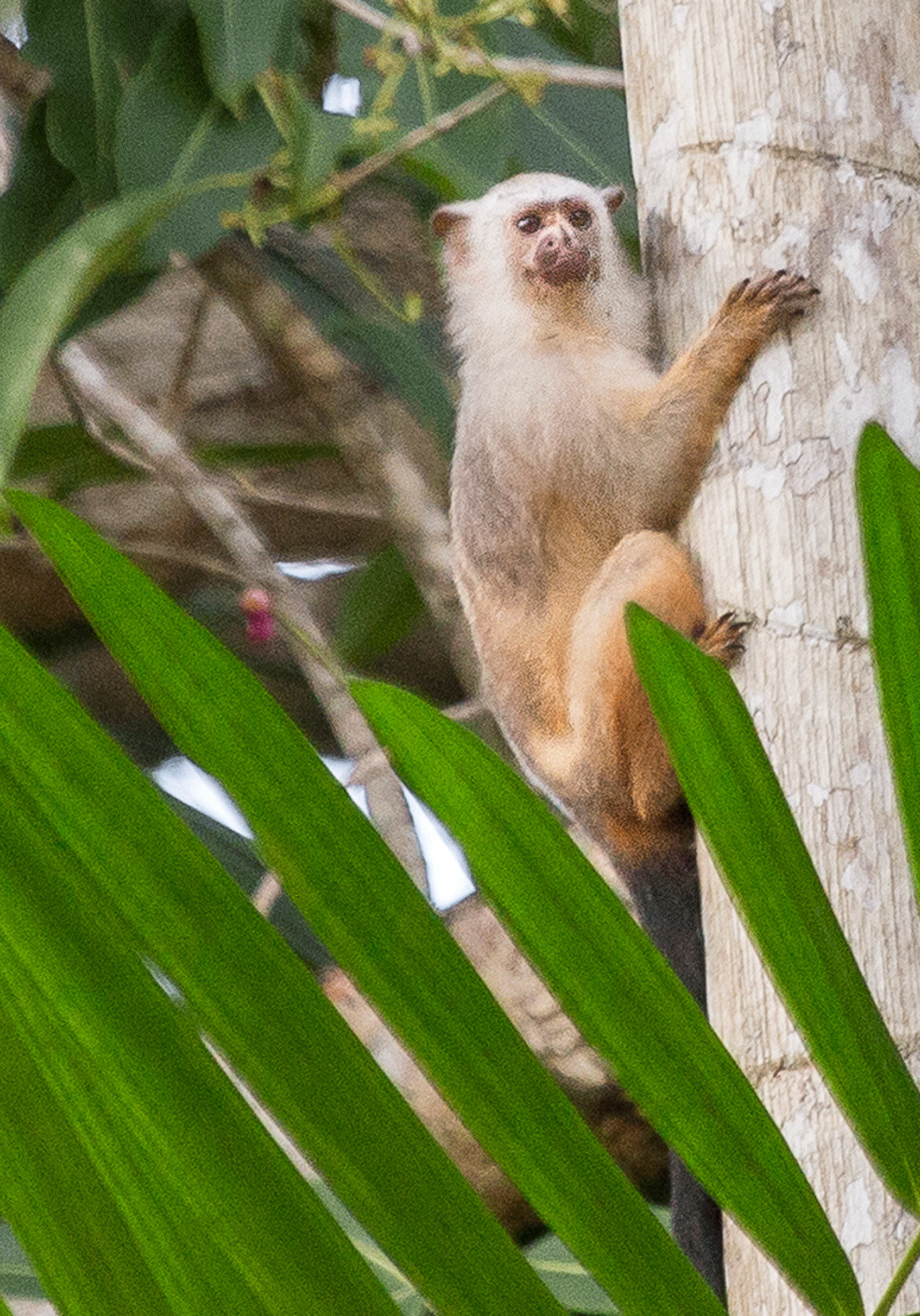

Conservation status
- Least Concern (IUCN 3.1)

Scientific classification
- Kingdom: Animalia
- Phylum: Chordata
- Class: Mammalia
- Order: Primates
- Family: Callitrichidae
- Genus: Mico
- Species: M. acariensis

Binomial name
- Mico acariensis (van Roosmalen et al., 2000)
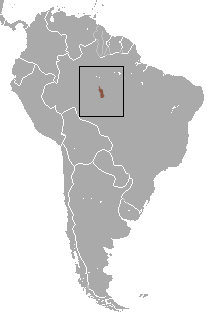
- Rio Acarí marmoset range

Synonyms
- Callithrix acariensis

= Rio Acarí marmoset =

Species of New World monkey

The Rio Acarí marmoset (Mico acariensis) is a marmoset species endemic to Brazil. It was first described in 2000.
