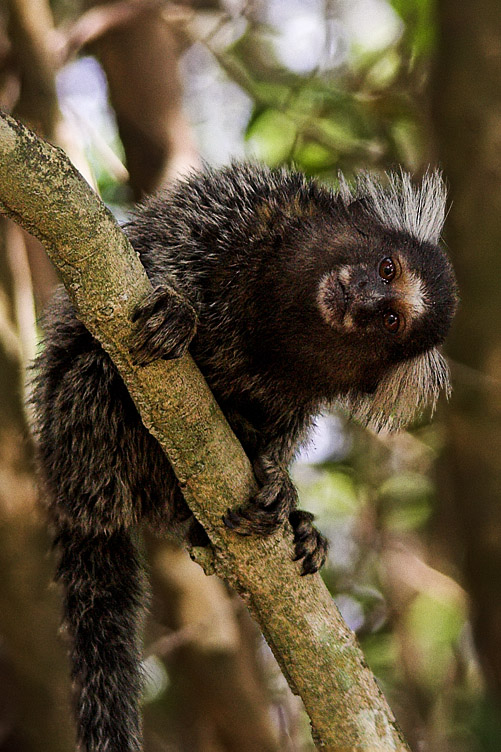
- Common marmoset (Callithrix jacchus)
- CITES Appendix I

Scientific classification
- Kingdom: Animalia
- Phylum: Chordata
- Class: Mammalia
- Order: Primates
- Family: Callitrichidae
- Genus: Callithrix; Erxleben, 1777

Type species
- Simia jacchus Linnaeus, 1758

Species
- 6; see text

Synonyms
- Anthopithecus F. Cuvier, 1829; Arctopithecus G. Cuvier, 1819; Hapale Illiger, 1811; Hapales F. Cuvier, 1829; Harpale Gray, 1821; Iacchus Spix, 1823; Jacchus É. Geoffroy, 1812; Midas É. Geoffroy, 1828; Ouistitis Burnett, 1826; Sagoin Desmarest, 1804; Sagoinus Kerr, 1792; Sagouin Lacépède, 1799; Saguin Fischer, 1803

= Callithrix =

Genus of New World monkeys

Callithrix is a genus of New World monkeys of the family Callitrichidae, the family containing marmosets and tamarins. The genus contains the Atlantic Forest marmosets. The name Callithrix is derived from the Greek words kallos, meaning beautiful, and thrix, meaning hair.

== Taxonomy ==
The genera Mico and Callibella were formerly considered a subgenus of the genus Callithrix. Callithrix differs from Mico in dental morphology and geographic distribution; Callithrix species are distributed near the Atlantic coast of Brazil, while Mico species are distributed further inland. Callithrix differs from Callibella in these features, as well as in size, with Callithrix species being significantly larger. Callithrix species differ from the tamarins of the genus Saguinus in that Callithrix has enlarged mandibular incisor teeth the same size as the canine teeth, which are used for gouging holes in trees to extract exudates.

Some authorities, including Rosenberger (1981), believe that the pygmy marmoset, genus Cebuella, should be included within Callithrix on the basis of genetic studies, although Cebuella is significantly smaller than Callithrix.

In general, Callithrix and Mico species tend to form larger groups and live within smaller home ranges, thus live in higher population densities, than other callitrichids, but these statistics can vary dramatically among various Callithrix species. C. jacchus and C. pencillata typically have home territories less than 10 hectares, while other Callithrix species tend to have larger home territories.

=== Species ===
The genus includes these species:

Genus Callithrix – Erxleben, 1777 – six species
Common name	Scientific name and subspecies	Range	Size and ecology	IUCN status and estimated population
Common marmoset	Callithrix jacchus (Linnaeus, 1758)	Brazil, in the states of Piaui, Paraiba, Ceará, Rio Grande do Norte, Pernambuco, Alagoas and Bahia.	Size: Habitat: Diet:	LC
Black-tufted marmoset	Callithrix penicillata (É. Geoffroy, 1812)	Brazil from Bahia to Paraná	Size: Habitat: Diet:	LC
Wied's marmoset	Callithrix kuhlii Coimbra-Filho, 1985	eastern Brazil	Size: Habitat: Diet:	VU
White-headed marmoset	Callithrix geoffroyi (Humboldt, 1812)	eastern Brazil	Size: Habitat: , Diet:	LC
Buffy-headed marmoset	Callithrix flaviceps (Thomas, 1903)	Brazil from southern Espírito Santo and possibly northern Rio de Janeiro and its distribution extends into Minas Gerais	Size: Habitat: Diet:	CR
Buffy-tufted marmoset	Callithrix aurita (É. Geoffroy, 1812)	southeast Brazil	Size: Habitat: Diet:	EN

== Ecology ==
Exudates, such as gum and sap, fruit, nectar, and fungi make up the bulk of Callthrix species' diet, but they also eat animal prey such as arthropods, young birds, and small lizards and frogs. They are specialized for exploiting exudates by their elongated, chisel-like lower incisors and a wide jaw gape that allows them to gouge bark of trees that produce gums. Their intestines also have an enlarged, complex cecum that allows them to digest gums more efficiently than most other animals. The ability of Callithrix species to feed on exudates allows them to survive in areas where fruit is highly seasonal or not readily available. Some species, such as C. jacchus and C. pencillata, have been known to inhabit city parks, backyards, and coconut plantations.

== Breeding ==
Callithrix females generally give birth to two, and sometimes more infants at a time. They can ovulate and conceive within 2-4 weeks after giving birth, and ovulation is not inhibited by lactation. Polygyny is known to occur in several Callithrix species. Infanticide is also known to occur, at least within C. jacchus, in which the dominant female kills the offspring of a subordinate female. Females generally reach sexual maturity between 12 and 17 months, and males between 15 and 25 months.
