= Van Roosmalen =

Van Roosmalen or van Roosmalen may refer to:

== People ==
- Marc van Roosmalen, a Dutch-Brazilian primatologist.
- Robin van Roosmalen, a Dutch kickboxer and mixed martial artist.
- Teigan Van Roosmalen, an Australian Paralympic swimmer.
