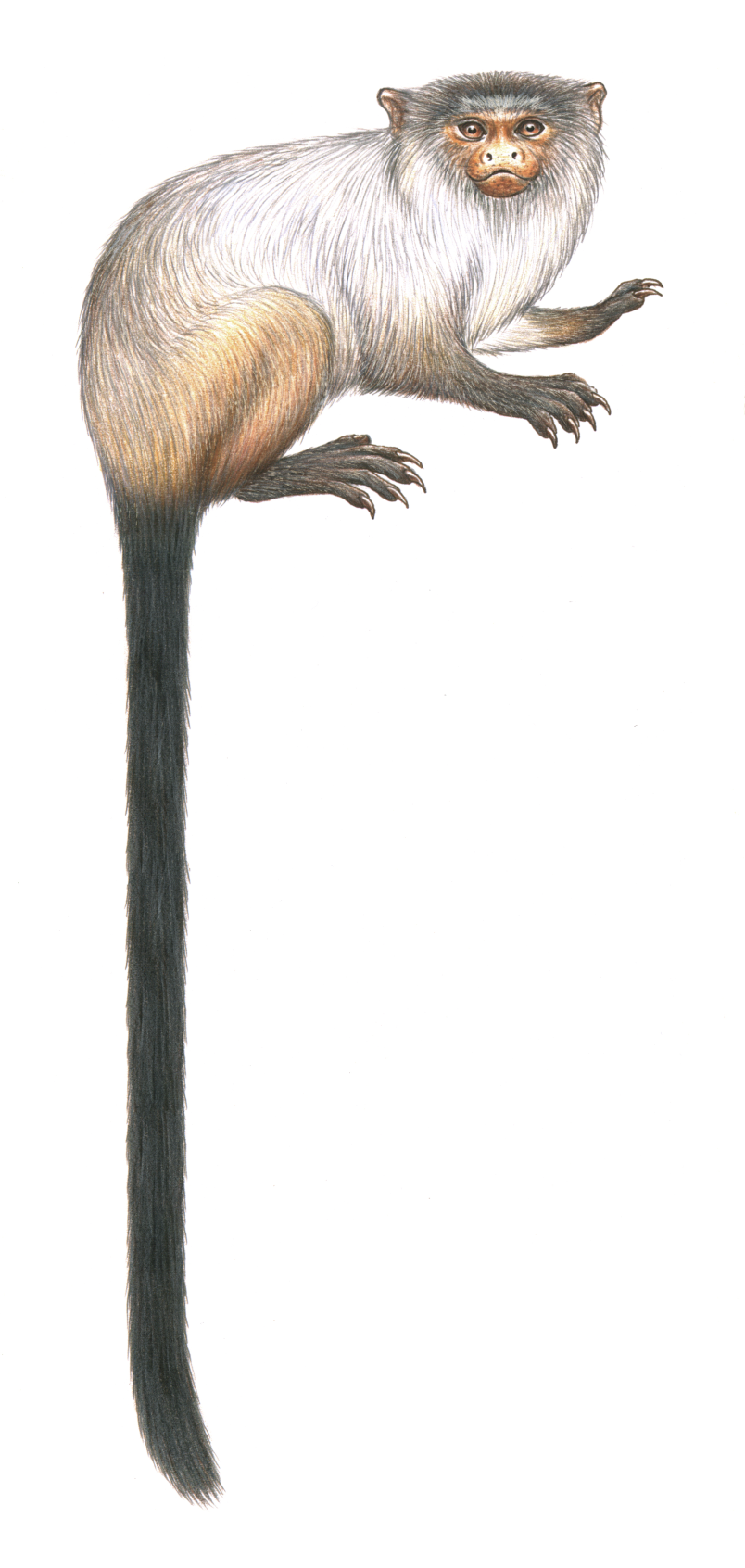

Conservation status
- Vulnerable (IUCN 3.1)

Scientific classification
- Kingdom: Animalia
- Phylum: Chordata
- Class: Mammalia
- Infraclass: Placentalia
- Order: Primates
- Family: Callitrichidae
- Genus: Mico
- Species: M. rondoni

Binomial name
- Mico rondoni Ferrari, Sena, Schneider, & Silva Jr., 2010
- Geographic range in South America

= Rondon's marmoset =

Species of New World monkey

Rondon's marmoset (Mico rondoni), also known as the Rondônia marmoset, is a small species of monkey from the family Callitrichidae found in the south-western Amazon in Brazil. It is endemic to the state of Rondônia, and its range bordered by the Rio Mamoré, Rio Madeira, Rio Ji-Paraná, Serra dos Pacaás Novos and possibly Bolivia. It was only described in 2010, and its name refers to the famous Amazonian explorer Cândido Rondon. Prior to its description, it was included in Emilia's marmoset (Mico emiliae).

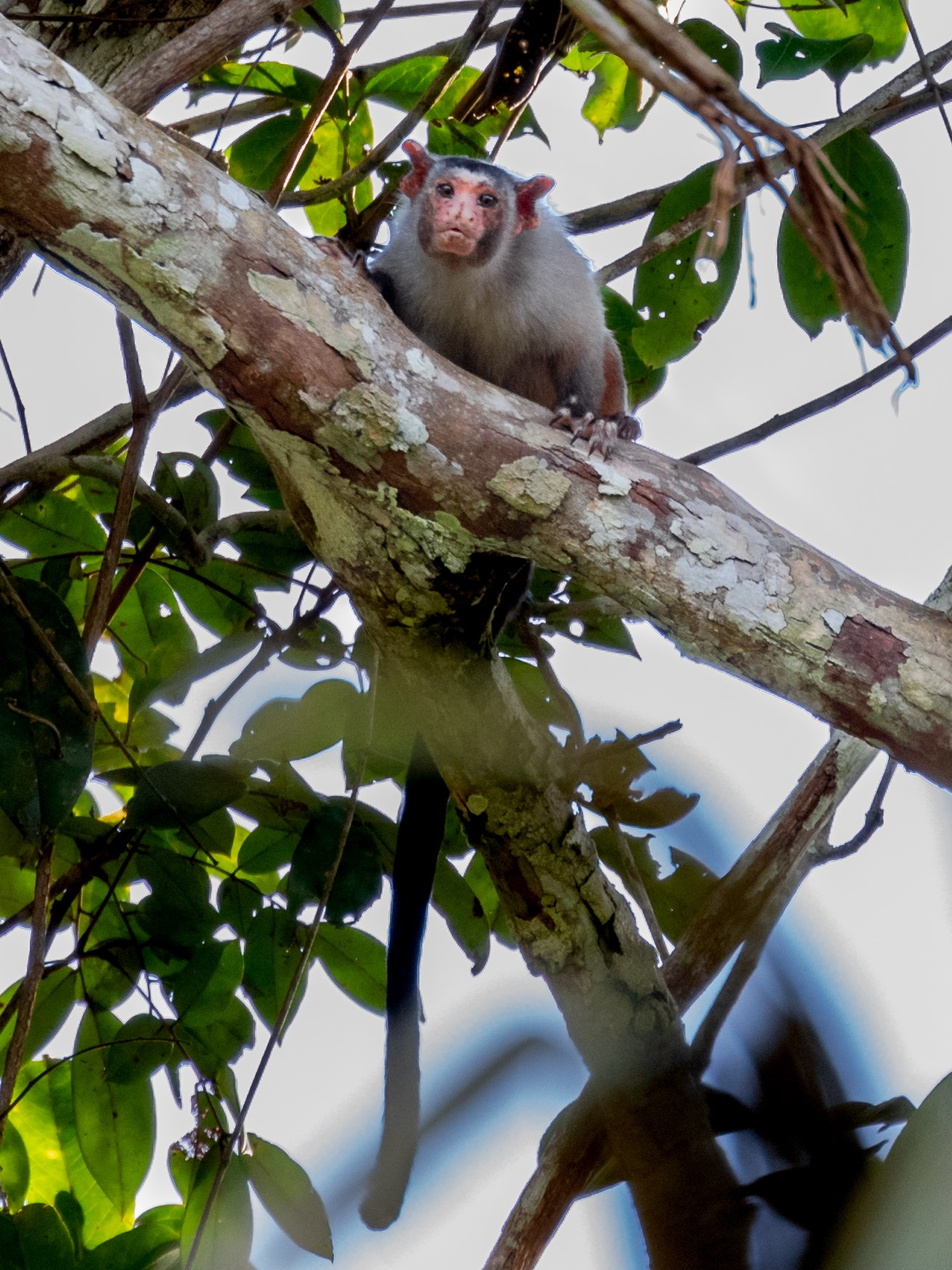
Rondon's marmoset in nature

Rondon's marmoset is a member of the silvery marmoset (Mico argentatus) group within the genus Mico. Like others in its group, its pelage is generally silvery-gray. It has dark fur on much of its head, forehead and the sides of its face, which contrasts with a whitish patch in the middle of its forehead. The fur on its legs become reddish-brown on its shins and almost black at the ankles. Its tail is mostly black. It averages about 330 grams (12 oz) in weight. Length excluding tail averages about 22 centimetres (8.7 in) and the tail averages about 31 centimetres (12 in).

Exudates are an important part of Rondon's marmoset's diet, and like other marmosets its digestive tract is specially adapted for this purpose. Adaptations include chisel-like lower incisors, which can gouge gum-producing trees to begin a flow of exudate, and an enlarged cecum, which helps digest the exudates.

Despite being able to tolerate habitat disturbance, Rondon's marmoset may be the most threatened species in the genus Mico. It is considered vulnerable by the IUCN, though it has been suggested that data deficient would be more appropriate.

Another callitrichid, Weddell's saddleback tamarin (Leontocebus weddelli) also occurs over much of Rondon's marmoset's range. However, Rondon's marmoset is rare or absent from areas where Weddell's saddleback tamarin is common. Weddell's saddleback tamarin is known to take over Rondon's marmoset's gum feeding sites.
