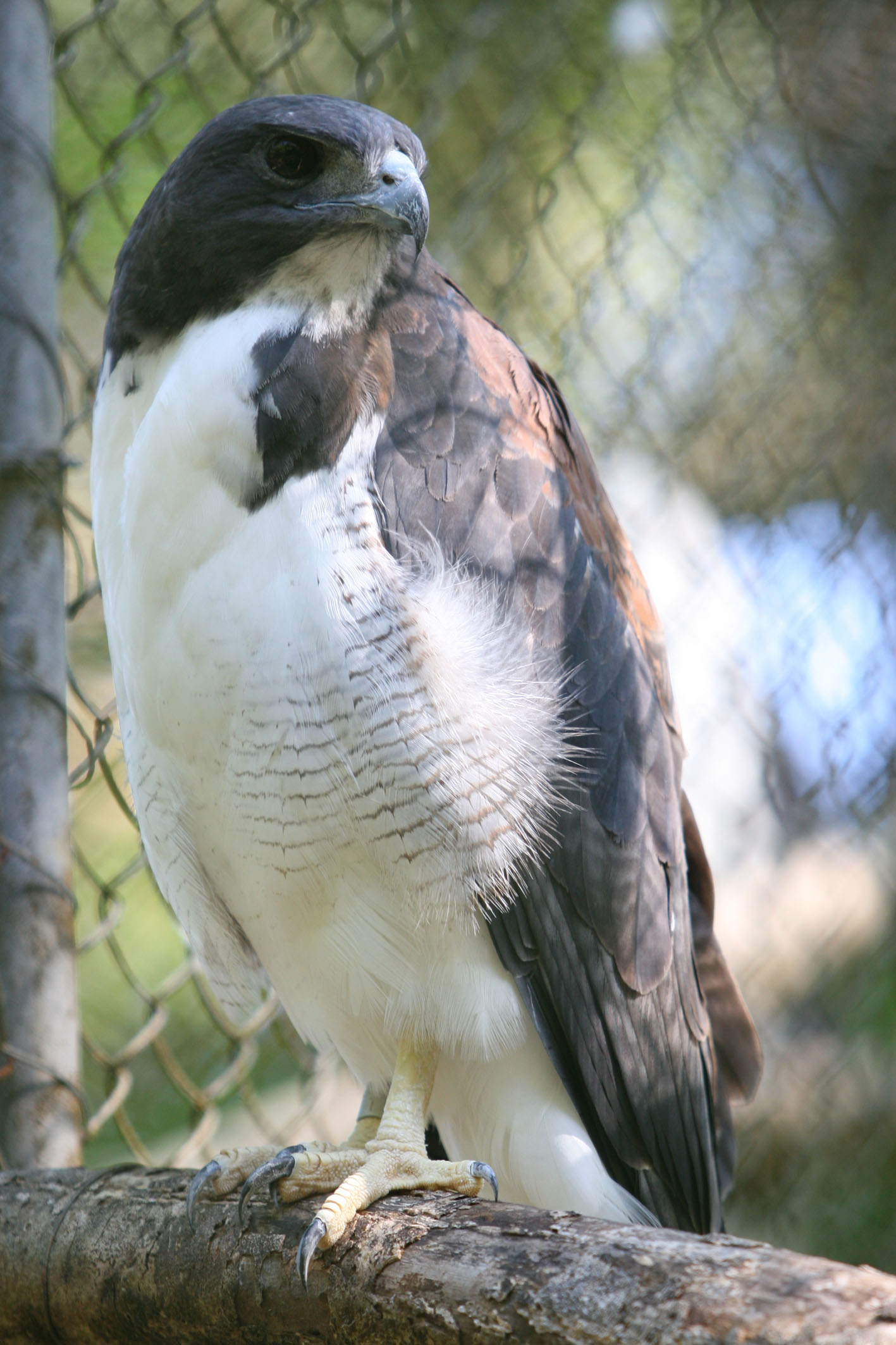
- Adult at Salvador Zoo, Ondina, Salvador, Bahia, Brazil

Conservation status
- Least Concern (IUCN 3.1)

Scientific classification
- Kingdom: Animalia
- Phylum: Chordata
- Class: Aves
- Order: Accipitriformes
- Family: Accipitridae
- Genus: Geranoaetus
- Species: G. albicaudatus

Binomial name
- Geranoaetus albicaudatus (Vieillot, 1816)

Subspecies
- G. a. hypospodius (Gurney Sr, 1876); G. a. colonus (Berlepsch, 1892); G. a. albicaudatus (Vieillot, 1816)

Synonyms
- Buteo albicaudatus

= White-tailed hawk =

Species of bird

The white-tailed hawk (Geranoaetus albicaudatus) is a large bird of prey species found in tropical and subtropical environments of the Americas.

== Distribution and habitat ==
The white-tailed hawk is found from the coastal of Texas and the Rio Grande Valley south to central Argentina. Its range also includes many Caribbean islands in the Lesser Antilles and Trinidad and Tobago. It prefers open or semi-open regions up to 2,000 ft (c. 600 m) ASL, with few trees to obstruct flight. It is not a migratory bird, though some populations may make regional movements when food is scarce. It commonly perches on bushes, trees, or telephone poles, stands on the ground, or engages in soar. Generally, it prefers arid habitats and rarely occurs in areas with heavy rainfall.

Though it may disappear from unsuitable locations following habitat fragmentation, it has a wide range and is not considered to be a globally threatened species by the IUCN.

== Description ==
The white-tailed hawk is a large, stocky hawk. It is similar in size to Swainson's (Buteo swainsoni) and red-tailed hawks (Buteo jamaicensis), with mean measurements slightly larger than the former and slightly smaller than the latter. It can attain a total length of 44–60 cm (17–24 in) and a wingspan of 118–143 cm (46–56 in). Body mass has been reported as 880–1,240 g (1.94–2.73 lb) (B. a. hysopodius) and 865–1,010 g (1.907–2.227 lb) (B. a. colonus). Standard measurements include a wing chord of 39–46.2 cm (15.4–18.2 in), a tail of 19.4–22 cm (7.6–8.7 in), and a tarsus of 8–9.2 cm (3.1–3.6 in).

Adult birds are grey above and white below and on the rump, with faint pale grey or rufous barring. The short tail is white with a narrow black band near the end that is conspicuous in flight. A rusty-red shoulder patch is also characteristic when the bird is perched with wings closed. The upperwings are dark, mixed with grey near the bases of the blackish primary remiges. The underwing is whitish, with indistinct brownish barring on the underwing coverts; this barring extends onto the flanks and thighs. The iris is hazel, the cere is pale green, the beak is black with a horn-colored base, and the feet are yellow with black talons.

Immature birds are darker than adults; they may appear nearly black in poor light, particularly those with little white below. The wing lining is conspicuously spotted black-and-white; the rusty shoulder patch is absent in younger birds. The tail changes from brown with several dark bars to greyish with a hazy dark band as the bird approaches maturity. The bare parts are colored similar to the adult.

In the Southern Hemisphere winter, young birds are sometimes mistaken for migrant red-backed hawks (Geranoaetus polyosoma).

== Call ==
Its call is a high-pitched cackling ke ke ke..., with a tinkling quality that reminds some of the bleating of a goat or the call of the laughing gull.

== Subspecies ==
Three subspecies are known:

Image	Subspecies	Description	Distribution
	Geranoaetus albicaudatus hypospodius	Intermediate in size and coloration. No dark morph.	coastal Texas and the Rio Grande Valley through Middle America to northern Colombia and western Venezuela.
	Geranoaetus albicaudatus colonus	Small and pale. Dark morph is ashy grey all over, except for the tail and underwing coverts; sometimes extensively marked rufous on the underside. Dark-morph immatures are sometimes black all over, except for the tail.	Eastern Colombia to Suriname south to the mouth of the Amazon River, extending into the Caribbean.
	Geranoaetus albicaudatus albicaudatus	Large and dark; throat usually black (except in western Argentina). The dark morph appears blackish above, blackish-brown below.	Southern Amazon rainforest to central Argentina

== Ecology ==
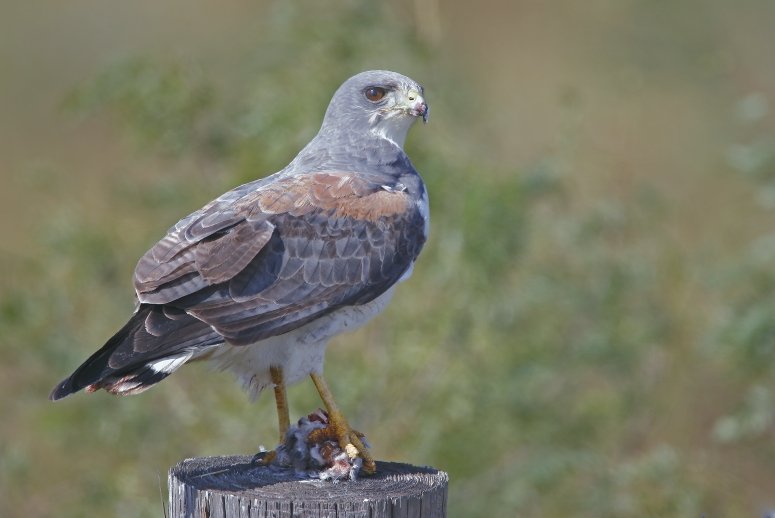
Adult B. a. hypospodius at Laguna Atascosa National Wildlife Refuge, Texas, USA

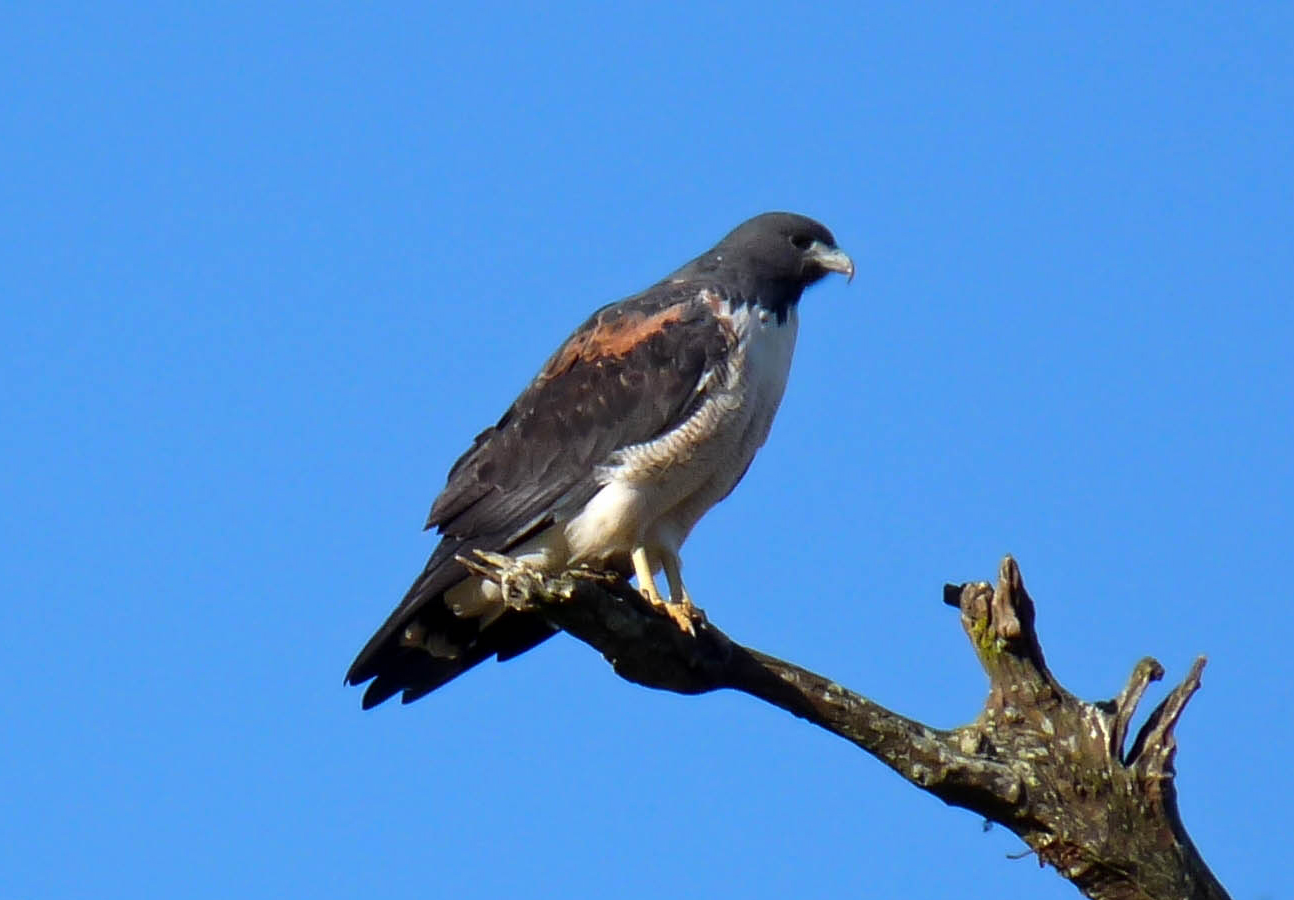
Adult, SE Brazil

=== Feeding ===
Its preferred hunting technique is to hover and observe the surroundings for signs of potential prey, gliding to another place when nothing is found. The diet of the white-tailed hawk varies with its environment. Rabbits make up the majority of the hawk's diet in southern Texas, while lizards 12 in (30 cm) or more in length are preferred prey in the Dutch West Indies. Other animals such as cotton rats, snakes, frogs, arthropods (especially grasshoppers, cicadas, and beetles), and small birds like passerines or quails are also eaten; it may take chickens if no other food source is available. In the open cerrado of Brazil, mixed-species feeding flocks react to white-tailed hawks with almost as much alarm as they do to dedicated bird predators such as the aplomado falcon. In the tropics, white-tailed hawks rank amongst the main predators of the small monkeys known as marmosets.

The white-tailed hawk is also known to feed on carrion and to gather with other birds at brushfires to catch small animals fleeing the flames.

=== Reproduction ===
Breeding pairs build nests from freshly broken twigs, often from thorny plants. Nests are typically placed 5–15 ft (1.5–5 m) or more above the ground in a tree or yucca, preferably in an elevated location offering good visibility from the nest. The interior is cushioned with dried grasses and other fine materials; green twigs of mesquite or other aromatic plants are often added, perhaps to deter parasites. Like many Accipitridae, white-tailed hawks tend to reuse nest sites. Nests built up over the years can thus reach sizes of up to 3 ft (1 m) across. The eggs are white, often lightly spotted with brown or lavender; between one and three (usually two) are laid per clutch. When approached at the nest, adults become airborne and observe the intruder from above. This contrasts with related hawks, which typically wait longer before flushing and may launch direct attacks.
