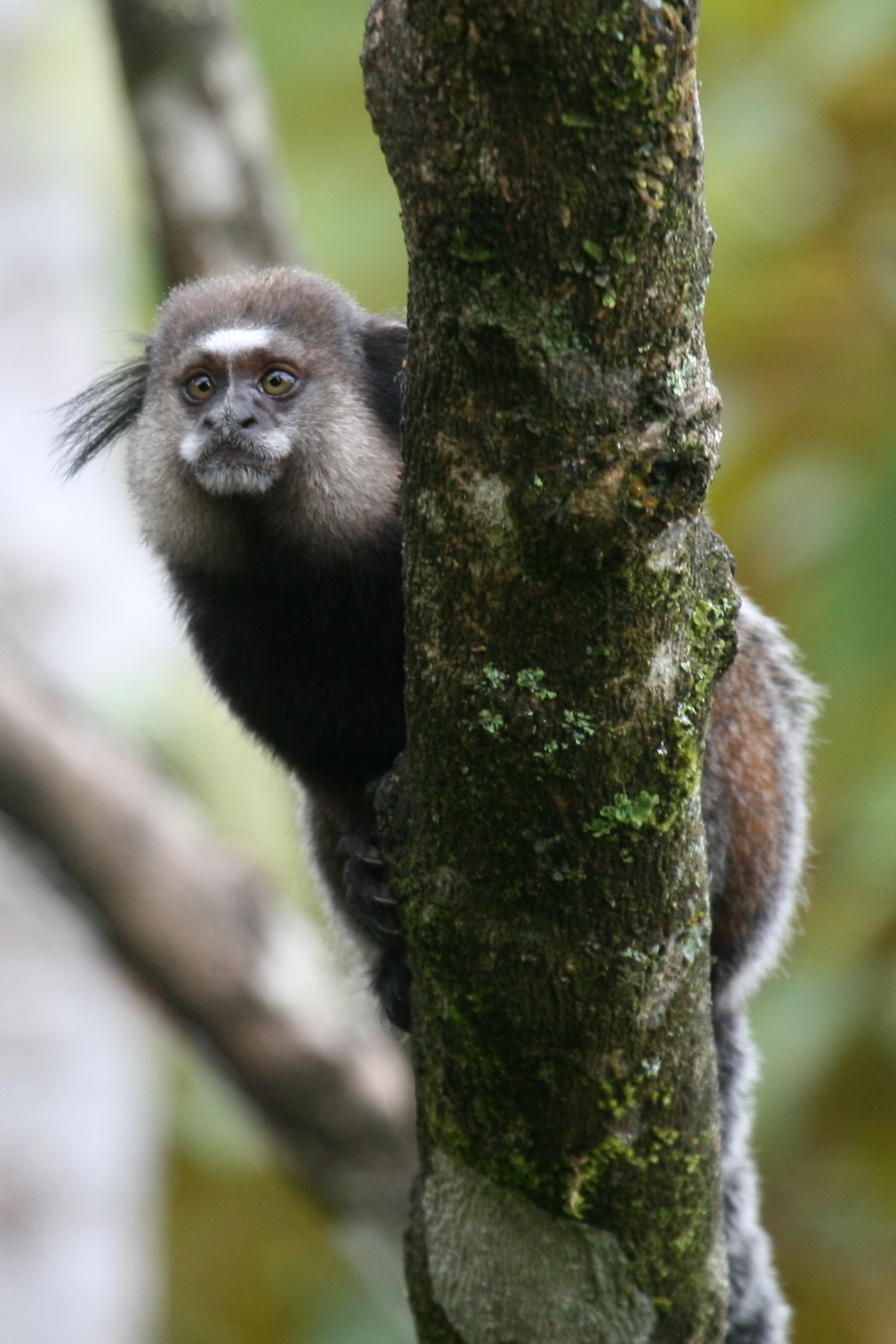
- At southern Bahia.

Conservation status
- Vulnerable (IUCN 3.1)

Scientific classification
- Kingdom: Animalia
- Phylum: Chordata
- Class: Mammalia
- Infraclass: Placentalia
- Order: Primates
- Family: Callitrichidae
- Genus: Callithrix
- Species: C. kuhlii

Binomial name
- Callithrix kuhlii Coimbra-Filho, 1985
- Distribution range

= Wied's marmoset =

Species of New World monkey

Wied's marmoset (Callithrix kuhlii), also known as Wied's black-tufted-ear marmoset, is a New World monkey that lives in tropical and subtropical forests of eastern Brazil. Unlike other marmosets, Wied's marmoset lives in groups consisting of 4 or 5 females and 2 or 3 males (plus children). They are matriarchal, and only the dominant female is allowed to mate. Like other marmosets, the offspring are always born in pairs.

== Etymology ==
Wied's marmoset is named after Prince Maximilian of Wied-Neuwied, who was the first person to discover the species during his travels from 1815-1816.

== Diet ==
The wied's marmoset will supplement its diet with fruit, nectar, gum, tree exudates, vines, and insects. When they eat insects, they will generally scan their environment before pouncing on the insects.

== Natural Predators ==
Wied's marmoset is eaten by birds of prey (the harpy eagle, the gray hawk, the roadside hawk and the white-tailed hawk), felines (the jaguar, jaguarundi and ocelot) and snakes.

== Behavior ==
Wied's marmoset is highly social, spending much of its time grooming. It has individually distinctive calls, and it communicates through gestures and olfactory markings as well.

== Appearance ==
The coloring of Wied's marmoset is mostly black, with white markings on cheeks and forehead. It has rings on its tail and black tufts of fur coming out of its ears.

== Chimerism ==
Chimeric individuals carry two or more genetic cell lines in their bodies, each of which stems from a separate and genetically distinct zygote. This chimerism is the result of cell lines exchanged between siblings in utero. These two original zygotes were fertilized by two different sperm, which potentially came from more than one male. Therefore, chimeric individuals exhibit a phenotype that is the result of more than one genotype, and potentially more than one father.

Researchers first discovered chimerism in the bone marrow of marmosets in the 1960s. More recent work has shown that chimerism can occur in all cell lines, including germ cells. This allows for the possibility of horizontal inheritance. In other words, individuals could pass on the genotype that is different from their majority (or self) genotype. Consider a father marmoset was chimeric in his germ line. This father could potentially pass on his secondary cell line (the majority or self cell line of his brother) to his offspring. In this way, this father's offspring would be more genetically similar to their uncle than to their father.

Since chimerism changes the degrees of relatedness between individuals, it also changes the adaptive value of certain behaviors, like cooperatively raising young. It has been proposed that chimerism creates a system that makes it evolutionarily advantageous for an individual to cooperate to raise its siblings; this closely matches to the way marmoset social systems have been observed to function in the wild.
