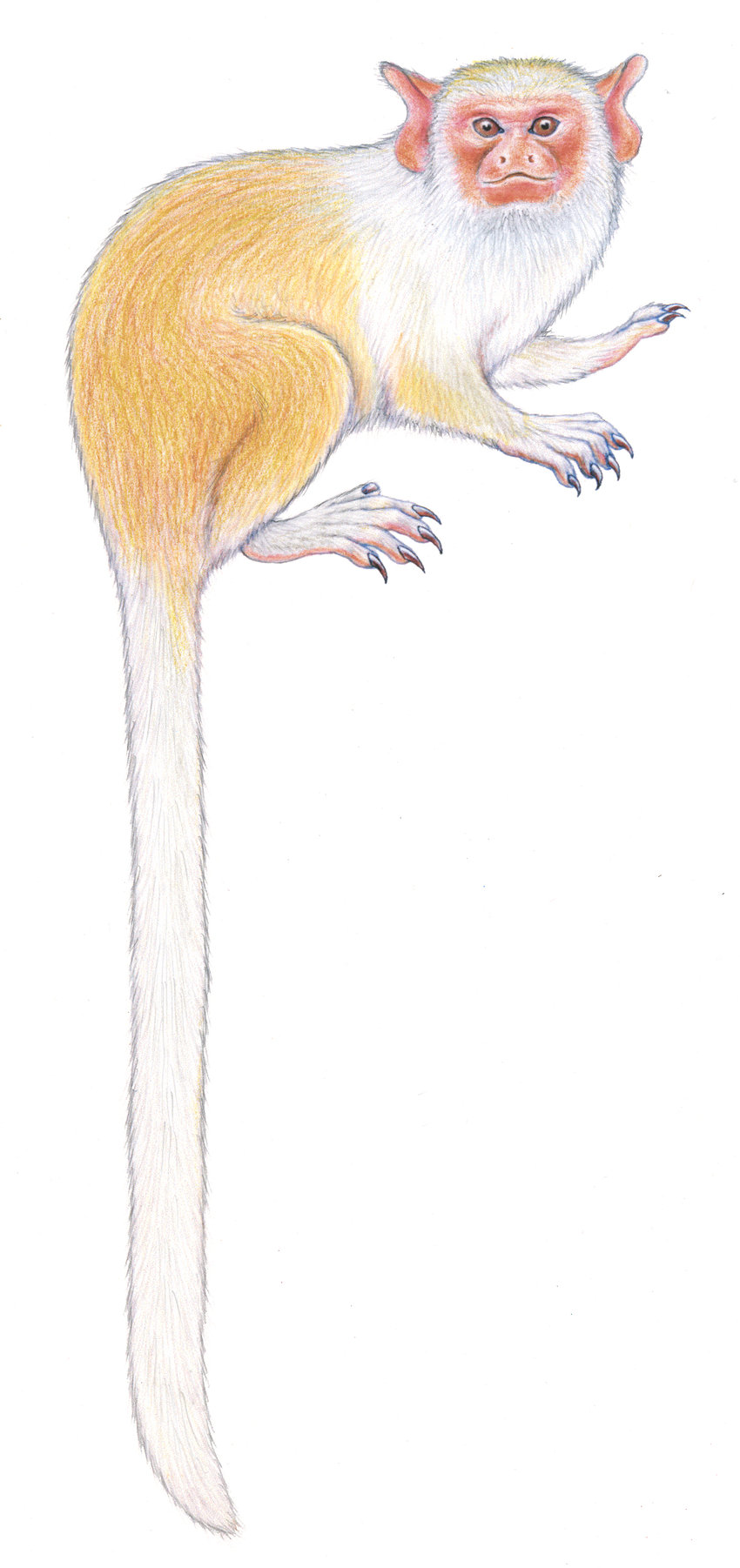

Conservation status
- Vulnerable (IUCN 3.1)

Scientific classification
- Kingdom: Animalia
- Phylum: Chordata
- Class: Mammalia
- Infraclass: Placentalia
- Order: Primates
- Family: Callitrichidae
- Genus: Mico
- Species: M. munduruku

Binomial name
- Mico munduruku Costa-Araújo, Farias & Hrbek, 2019
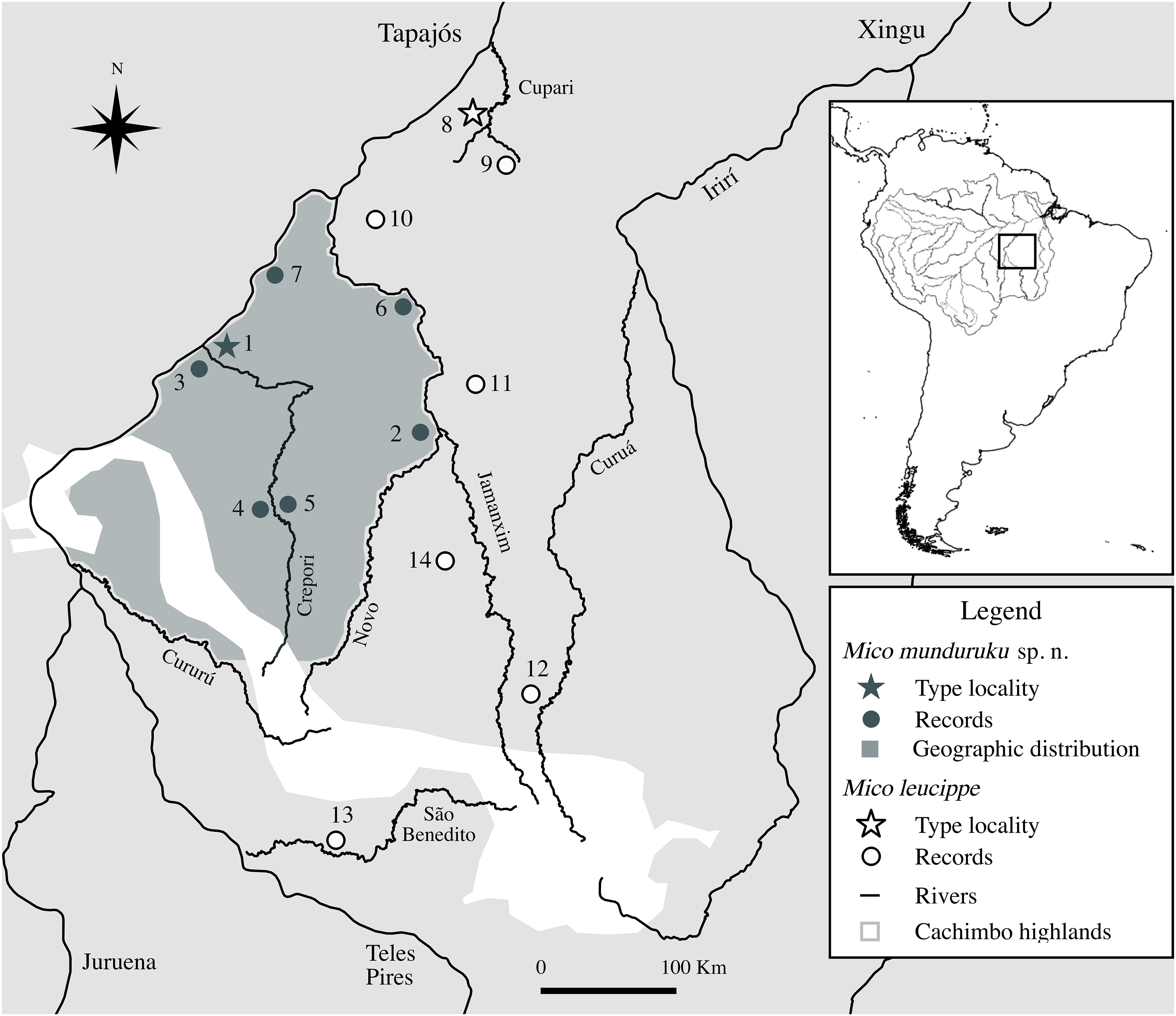
- Distribution in dark blue-grey

= Munduruku marmoset =

Species of New World monkey

The Munduruku marmoset (Mico munduruku) is a marmoset endemic to Brazil. It is found only in the southern Amazon, in an area of approximately 120,000 km^{2}, from the right bank of the Jamanxim River, below the mouth of the Rio Novo, to the mouth of the Tapajós River, below the mouth of the Cururu River. According to researcher and discoverer Rodrigo Araújo, approximately half of the distribution area lies within Mundurucu Indigenous Territory in the Amazonas state. The name sagui-dos-Munduruku is a tribute to the Munduruku people who lives in the same location as the species.
