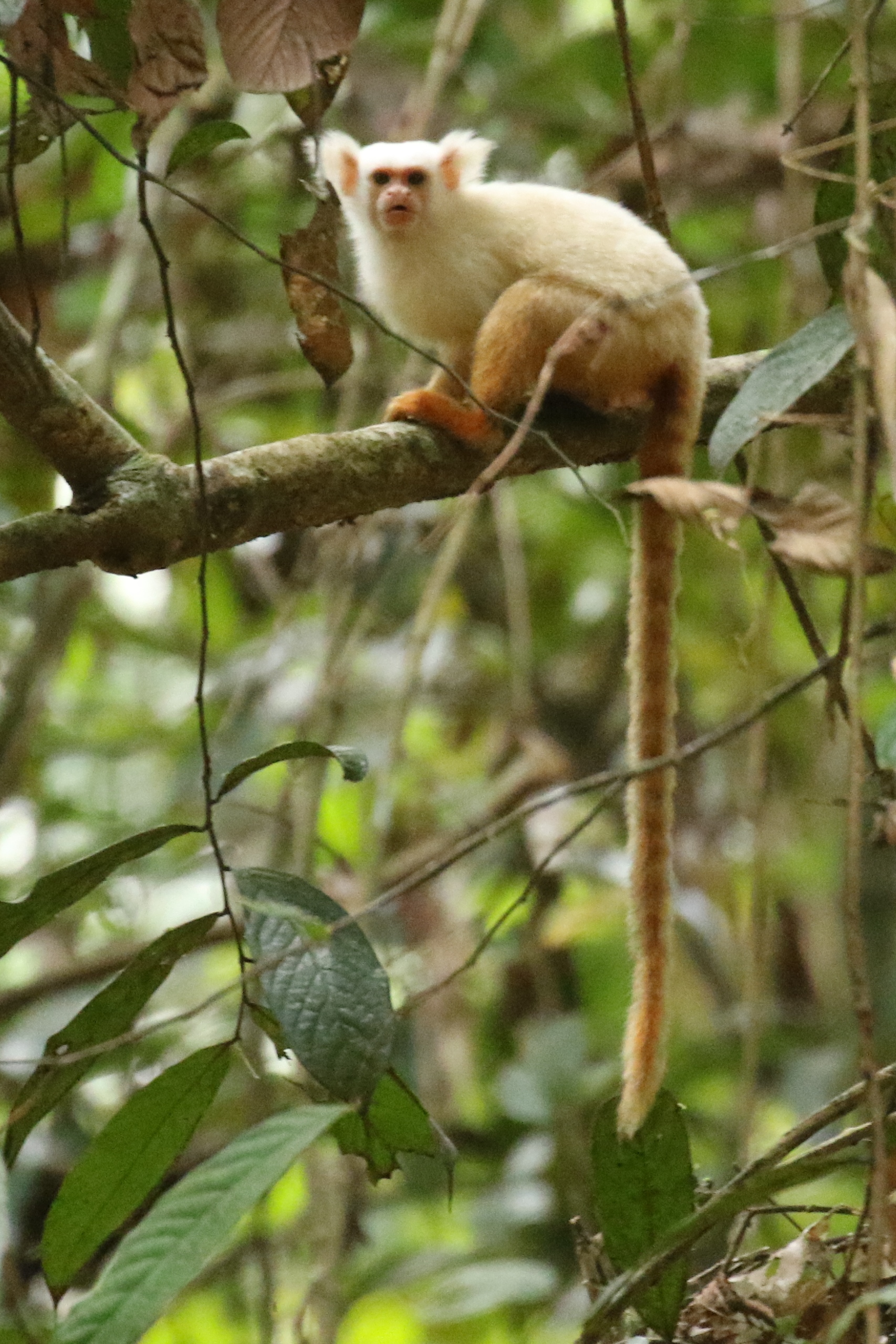

Conservation status
- Least Concern (IUCN 3.1)

Scientific classification
- Kingdom: Animalia
- Phylum: Chordata
- Class: Mammalia
- Infraclass: Placentalia
- Order: Primates
- Family: Callitrichidae
- Genus: Mico
- Species: M. chrysoleucos

Binomial name
- Mico chrysoleucos (Wagner, 1842)
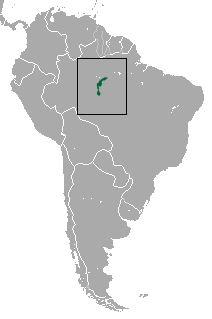
- Gold-and-white Marmoset range

Synonyms
- melanoleucus Miranda Ribeiro, 1955; sericeus Gray, 1868

= Gold-and-white marmoset =

Species of New World monkey

The gold-and-white marmoset (Mico chrysoleucos), also known as the golden-white tassel-ear marmoset, is a species of marmoset, a small monkey endemic to the Amazon rainforest in eastern Amazonas state, Brazil.
