= Marca's marmoset =

Conservation status
- Vulnerable (IUCN 3.1)

Scientific classification
- Kingdom: Animalia
- Phylum: Chordata
- Class: Mammalia
- Infraclass: Placentalia
- Order: Primates
- Family: Callitrichidae
- Genus: Mico
- Species: M. marcai

Binomial name
- Mico marcai Alperin, 1993
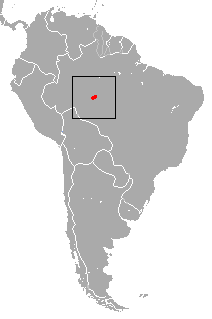
- Marca's marmoset range

Synonyms
- Mico manicorensis van Roosmalen et al., 2000

Species of New World monkey

The Marca's marmoset (Mico marcai) is a species of marmoset that is endemic to the Amazon, in the Aripuanã-Manicoré interfluvium in Brazil. Its body is light grey, with orange legs, a black tail, a pinkish face, and naked ears. It is about 9 inches (23 cm) long, excluding the tail, and it has a 15-inch (38 cm) long tail. It weighs about 12 ounces (340 g).

It was previously thought to be virtually unknown; in 2008 the IUCN noted that it had never been seen in the wild, though it has been observed since then. However, later studies found the Manicore marmoset (Mico manicorensis), discovered in the Campos Amazônicos National Park in 2000, to be conspecific with M. marcai, and thus both were synonymized.
