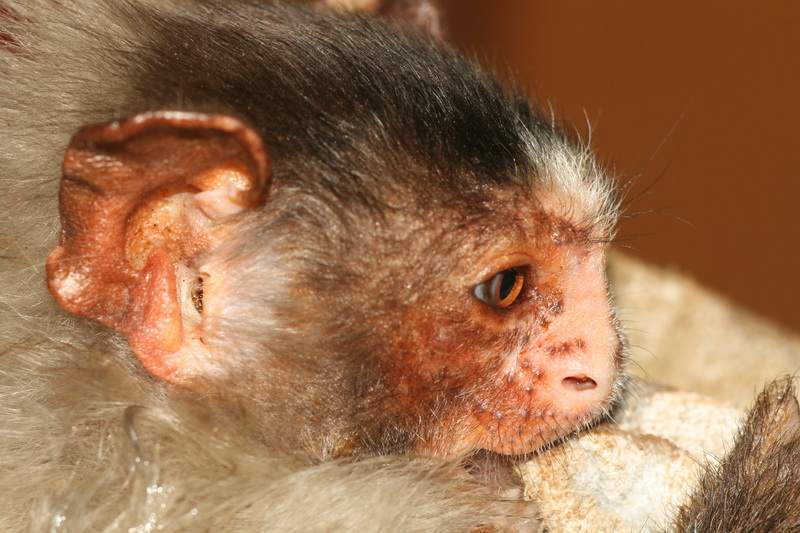

Conservation status
- Near Threatened (IUCN 3.1)

Scientific classification
- Kingdom: Animalia
- Phylum: Chordata
- Class: Mammalia
- Infraclass: Placentalia
- Order: Primates
- Family: Callitrichidae
- Genus: Mico
- Species: M. nigriceps

Binomial name
- Mico nigriceps Ferrari & Lopes, 1992
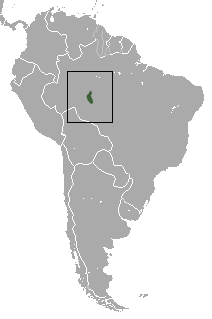
- Black-headed marmoset range

= Black-headed marmoset =

Species of New World monkey

The black-headed marmoset (Mico nigriceps) is a marmoset species endemic to Brazil. It inhabits humid tropical rainforest, mostly second growth and edge; the distribution is not exactly known but is thought to be Rio dos Marmelos in the north and east, Madeira River in the west and Ji-Paraná River in the south.
