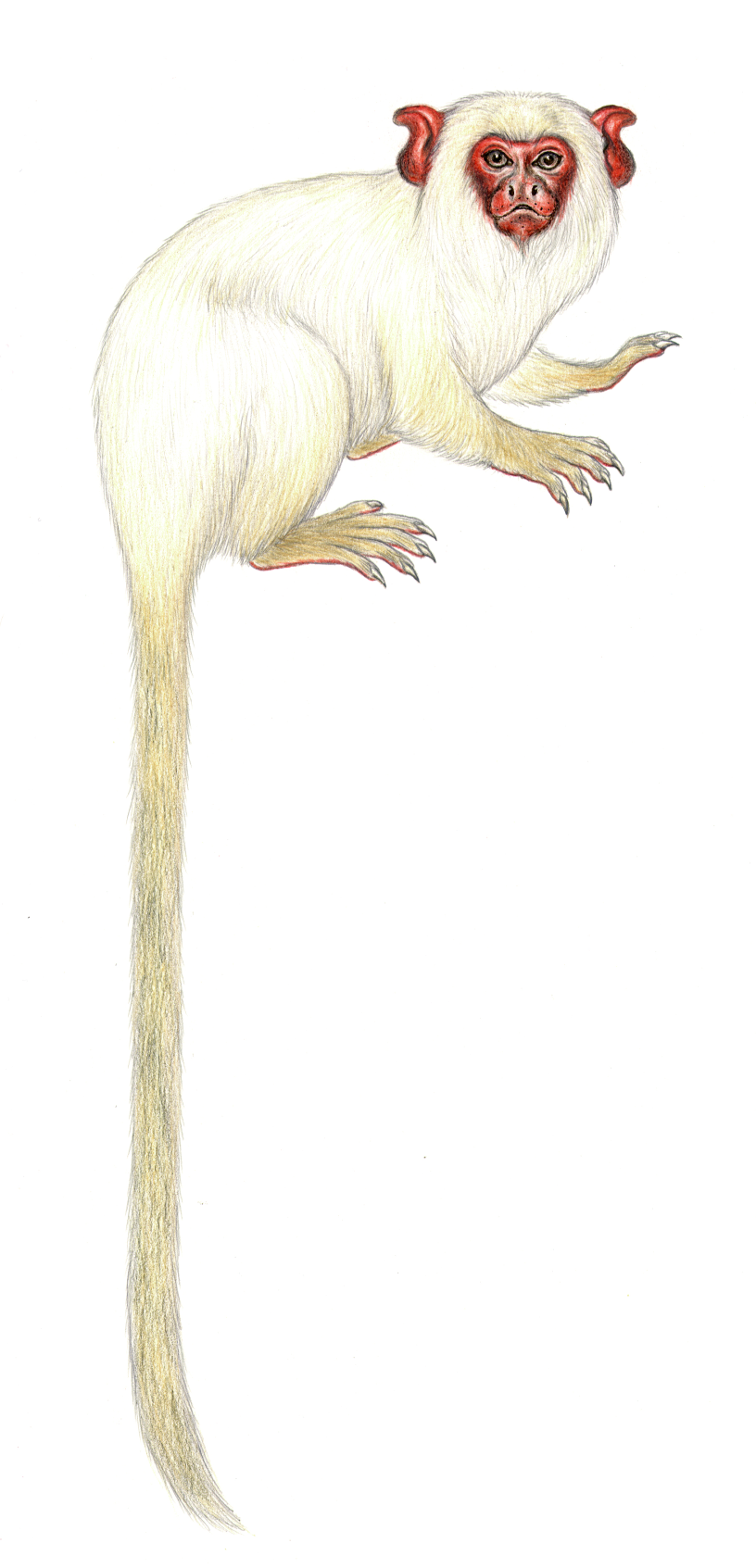

Conservation status
- Least Concern (IUCN 3.1)

Scientific classification
- Kingdom: Animalia
- Phylum: Chordata
- Class: Mammalia
- Order: Primates
- Family: Callitrichidae
- Genus: Mico
- Species: M. leucippe

Binomial name
- Mico leucippe Thomas, 1922
- Geographic range

= White marmoset =

Species of New World monkey

The white marmoset (Mico leucippe), or golden-white bare-ear marmoset, is a species of marmoset, a small monkey endemic to the Amazon rainforest in Pará, Brazil.
