= Satéré marmoset =

Conservation status
- Least Concern (IUCN 3.1)

Scientific classification
- Kingdom: Animalia
- Phylum: Chordata
- Class: Mammalia
- Order: Primates
- Family: Callitrichidae
- Genus: Mico
- Species: M. saterei

Binomial name
- Mico saterei Silva & Noronha, 1998
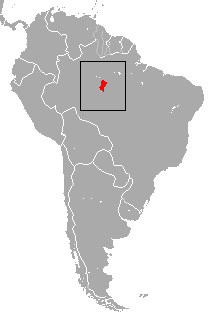
- Satere Marmoset range

Species of New World monkey

The Satéré marmoset (Mico saterei) is a marmoset species endemic to Brazil.
