= Roosmalens' dwarf marmoset =

Conservation status
- Least Concern (IUCN 3.1)

Scientific classification
- Kingdom: Animalia
- Phylum: Chordata
- Class: Mammalia
- Order: Primates
- Family: Callitrichidae
- Genus: Mico
- Species: M. humilis

Binomial name
- Mico humilis (van Roosmalen et al., 1998)
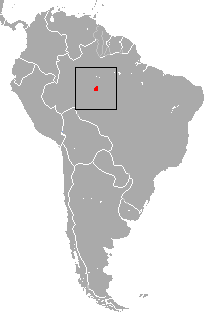
- Roosmalens' dwarf marmoset range

Synonyms
- Callibella humilis; Callithrix humilis

Species of New World monkey

The Roosmalens' dwarf marmoset (Mico humilis), also known as the black-crowned dwarf marmoset, is a small New World monkey native to the Amazon rainforest, on the east bank of the lower Madeira River, and the west bank of the Aripuanã River, in Brazil. It has the smallest distribution of any primate in Amazonia. This marmoset has several unique attributes, which has resulted in it sometimes being placed in the monotypic genus Callibella. However, genetic analysis has subsequently resulted in its being classified within the genus Mico.

It was first described in 1998, after it was discovered ca. 400 km (250 mi) south of the city of Manaus. In 1996, Marc van Roosmalen, the discoverer, was given a milk can by a river trader with one of these monkeys inside. He suspected it was a new species, a relative of the pygmy marmoset, but at that point was unaware of its exact origin. Following a lengthy expedition, it was discovered near the town of Nova Olinda in southeastern Amazonas. The species has been subsequently recorded further south, along the west banks of Rio Roosevelt.

Adult Roosmalens' dwarf marmosets have a total length of 38–39 cm (15-15½ in), incl. a tail of 22–24 cm (8½–9½ in), and weigh 150–185 g (5½–6½ oz). It is the second smallest species of monkey, with only the related pygmy marmoset being smaller. The upperparts of Roosmalens' dwarf marmoset are mainly dark olive-brown, while the underparts are pale, dull yellowish. The bare, pale pinkish face is bordered by a whitish ring of hair. The crown is blackish, as suggested by its alternative common name; black-crowned dwarf marmoset. It has claws as opposed to nails, like other marmosets who feed off tree sap. It also has teeth similar to other marmosets.

It is considered unusual among marmosets in that it gives birth to only a single baby instead of twins, the norm for marmosets. Marmosets are often very territorial, though this is not the case among Roosmalens' dwarf marmoset, where it is common for multiple females in a group to have young, instead of one dominant female.

== Predation ==
Roosmalens' dwarf marmosets are eaten by Falconiformes, domestic dogs and domestic cats. Arboreal snakes and wild, arboreal felids are also potential predators.
