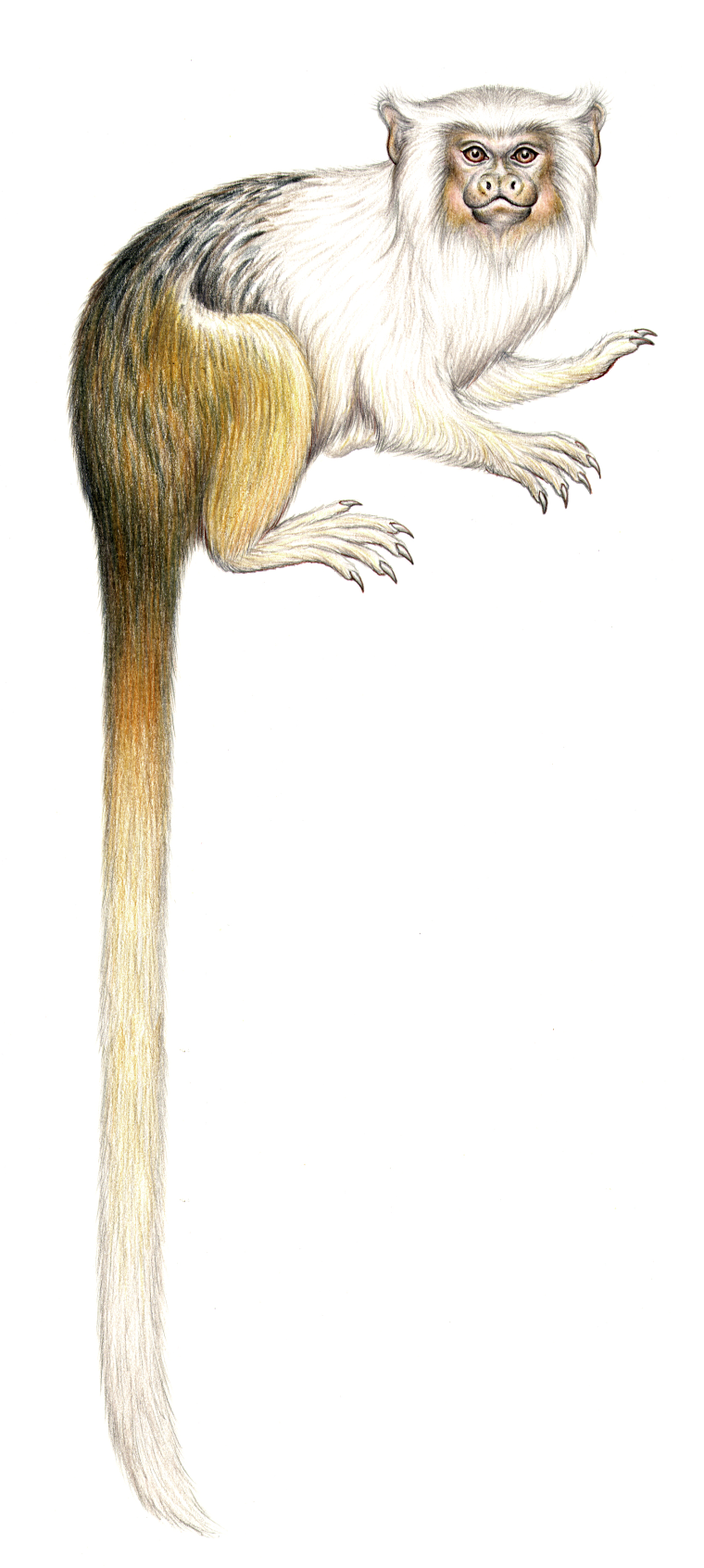

Conservation status
- Least Concern (IUCN 3.1)

Scientific classification
- Kingdom: Animalia
- Phylum: Chordata
- Class: Mammalia
- Order: Primates
- Family: Callitrichidae
- Genus: Mico
- Species: M. intermedius

Binomial name
- Mico intermedius Hershkovitz, 1977
- Geographic range

= Hershkovitz's marmoset =

Species of New World monkey

The Hershkovitz's marmoset (Mico intermedius), also known as the Aripuanã marmoset is a marmoset species endemic to the south-central Amazon rainforest in Brazil. The common name is a reference to American zoologist Philip Hershkovitz.

== Predation ==
Predators of Hershkovitz’s marmosets include slaty-backed forest falcons.
