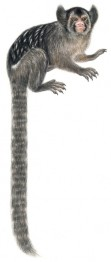

Conservation status
- Least Concern (IUCN 3.1)

Scientific classification
- Kingdom: Animalia
- Phylum: Chordata
- Class: Mammalia
- Order: Primates
- Family: Callitrichidae
- Genus: Mico
- Species: M. mauesi

Binomial name
- Mico mauesi R.A. Mittermeier, Schwarz & Ayres, 1992
- Geographic distribution

= Maués marmoset =

Species of New World monkey

The Maués marmoset (Mico mauesi) is a marmoset endemic to Brazil. It is found only on the west bank of the Maués Açu River, in the Amazonas state.
