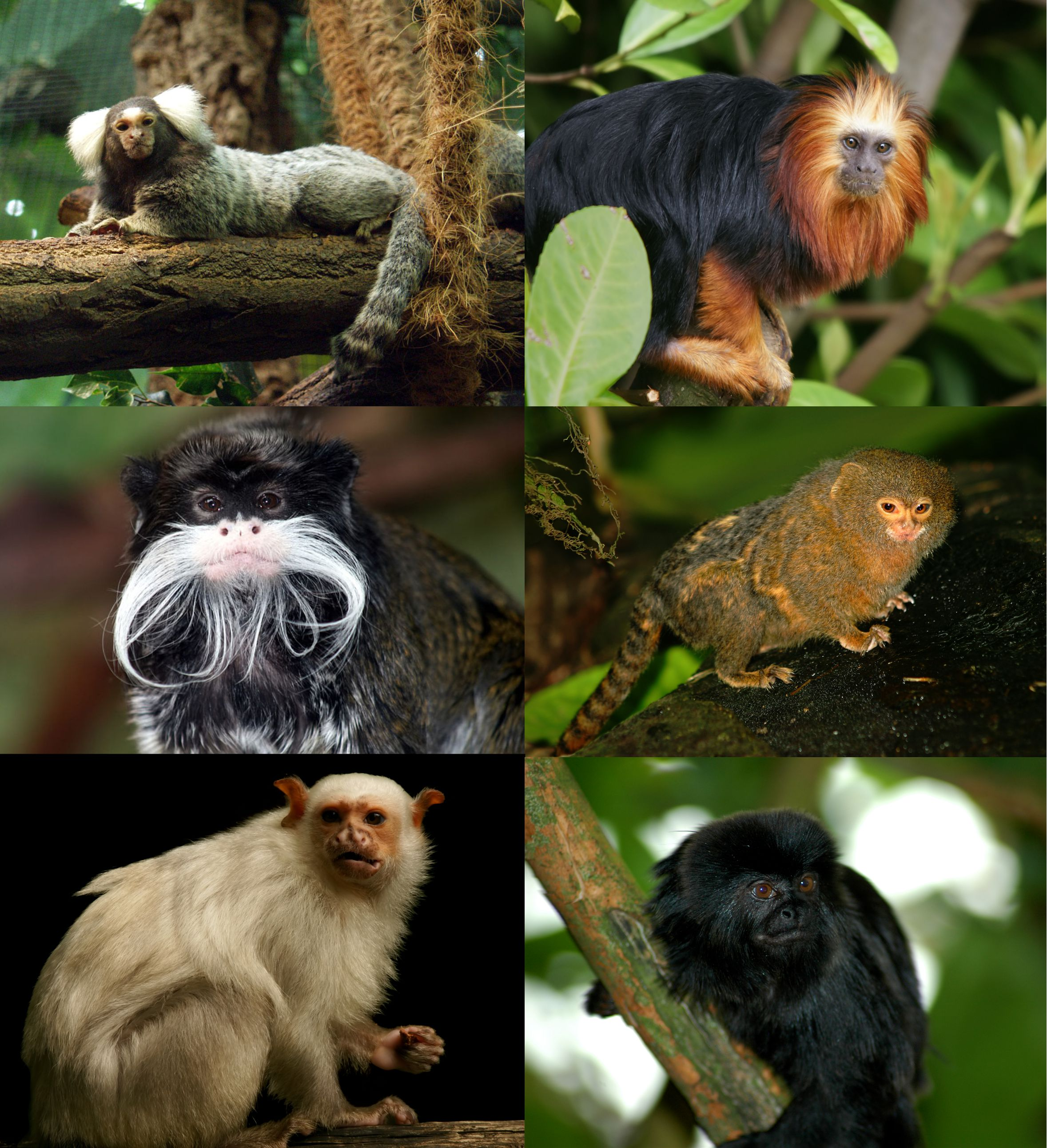
- Major extant callitrichid genera: Callithrix, Leontopithecus, Saguinus, Cebuella, Mico, Callimico.

Scientific classification
- Kingdom: Animalia
- Phylum: Chordata
- Class: Mammalia
- Order: Primates
- Suborder: Haplorhini
- Infraorder: Simiiformes
- Parvorder: Platyrrhini
- Family: Callitrichidae; Thomas, 1903

Type genus
- Callithrix Erxleben, 1777

Genera
- See text
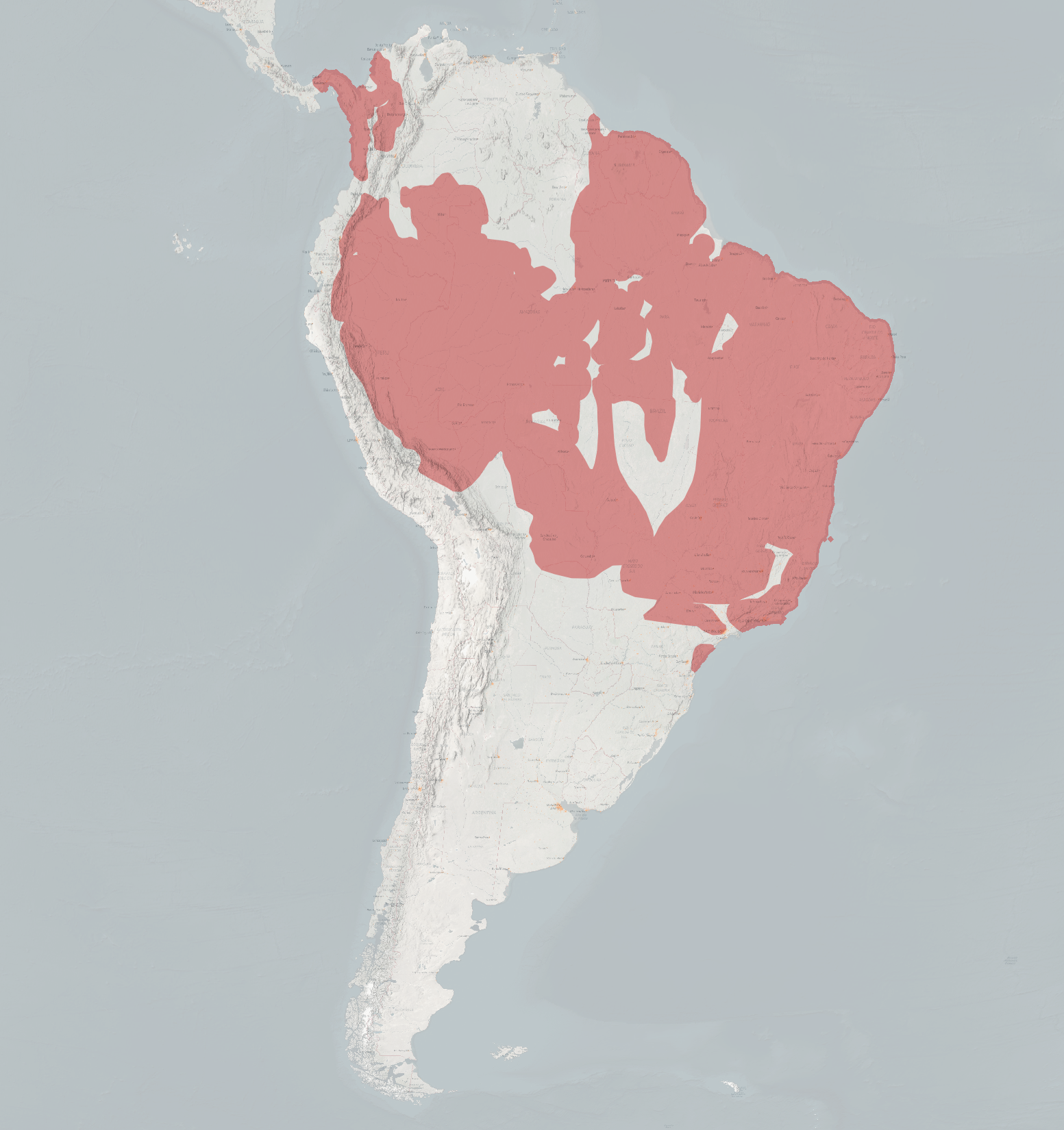
- The range of Callitrichidae species

Synonyms
- Callitrichidae Napier and Napier, 1967; Hapalidae Wagner, 1840

= Callitrichidae =

Family of New World monkeys

The Callitrichidae (also called Arctopitheci or Hapalidae) are a family of New World monkeys, including marmosets, tamarins, and lion tamarins. At times, this group of animals has been regarded as a subfamily, called the Callitrichinae, of the family Cebidae.

This taxon was traditionally thought to be a primitive lineage, from which all the larger-bodied platyrrhines evolved. However, some works argue that callitrichids are actually a dwarfed lineage.

Ancestral stem-callitrichids likely were "normal-sized" ceboids that were dwarfed through evolutionary time. This may exemplify a rare example of insular dwarfing in a mainland context, with the "islands" being formed by biogeographic barriers during arid climatic periods when forest distribution became patchy, and/or by the extensive river networks in the Amazon Basin.

All callitrichids are arboreal. They are the smallest of the simian primates. They eat insects, fruit, and the sap or gum from trees; occasionally, they take small vertebrates. The marmosets rely quite heavily on tree exudates, with some species (e.g. Callithrix jacchus and Cebuella pygmaea) considered obligate exudativores.

Callitrichids typically live in small, territorial groups of about five or six animals. Their social organization is unique among primates, and is called a "cooperative polyandrous group". This communal breeding system involves groups of multiple males and females, but only one female is reproductively active. Females mate with more than one male and each shares the responsibility of carrying the offspring.

They are the only primate group that regularly produces twins, which constitute over 80% of births in species that have been studied. Unlike other male primates, male callitrichids generally provide as much parental care as females. Parental duties may include carrying, protecting, feeding, comforting, and even engaging in play behavior with offspring. In some cases, such as in the cotton-top tamarin (Saguinus oedipus), males, particularly those that are paternal, even show a greater involvement in caregiving than females. The typical social structure seems to constitute a breeding group, with several of their previous offspring living in the group and providing significant help in rearing the young.

== Species and subspecies list ==
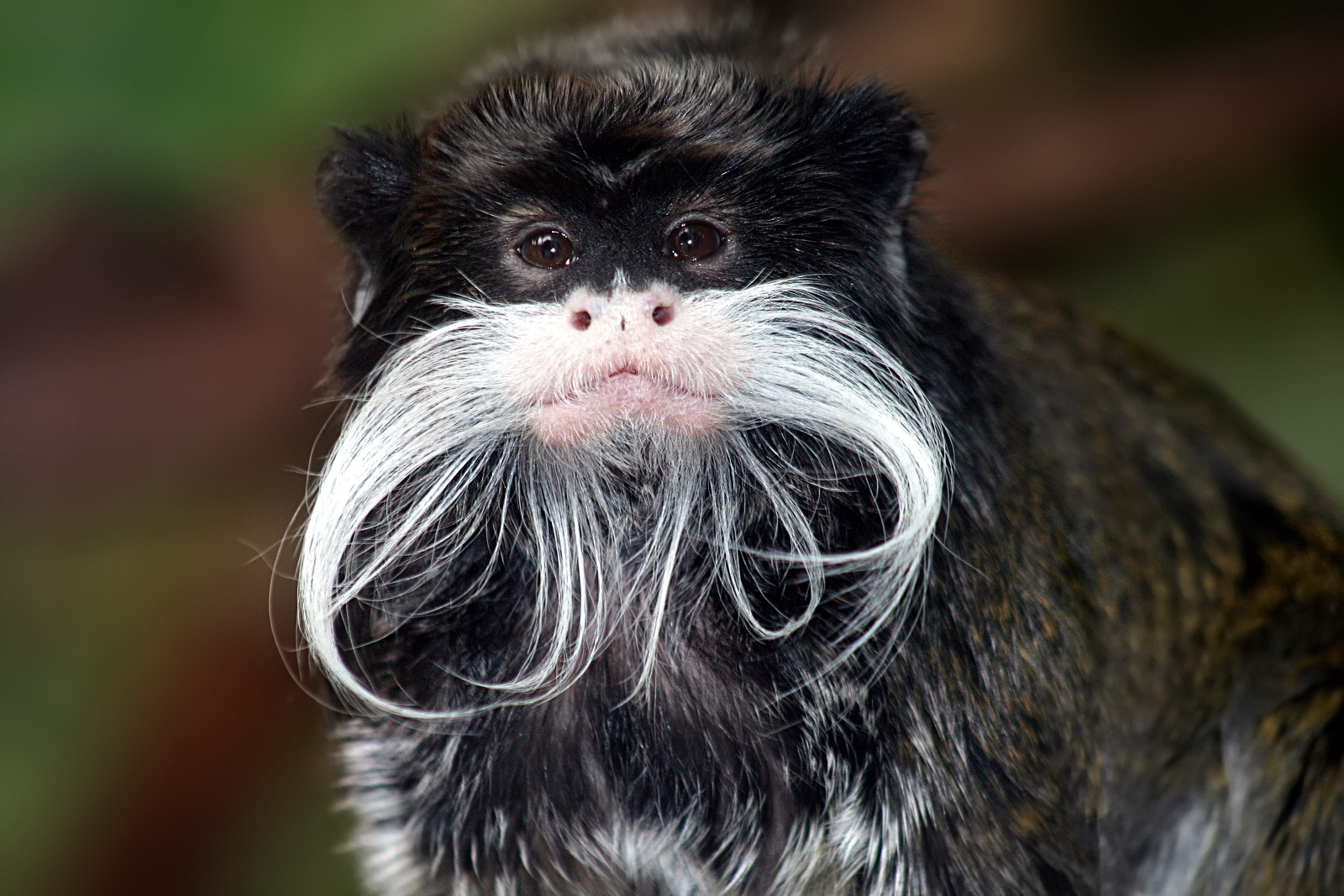
Emperor tamarin (Saguinus imperator)

Taxa included in the Callitrichidae are:

- Family Callitrichidae
  - Genus Saguinus
    - Subgenus Saguinus
      - Golden-handed tamarin, Saguinus midas
      - Western black tamarin, Saguinus niger
      - Eastern black-handed tamarin, Saguinus ursulus
      - Pied tamarin, Saguinus bicolor
      - Martins's tamarin, Saguinus martinsi
        - Saguinus martinsi martinsi
        - Saguinus martinsi ochraceus
      - White-footed tamarin, Saguinus leucopus
      - Cottontop tamarin, Saguinus oedipus
      - Geoffroy's tamarin, Saguinus geoffroyi
    - Subgenus Tamarinus
      - Moustached tamarin, Saguinus mystax
        - Spix's moustached tamarin, Saguinus mystax mystax
        - Red-capped moustached tamarin, Saguinus mystax pileatus
        - White-rump moustached tamarin, Saguinus mystax pluto
      - White-lipped tamarin, Saguinus labiatus
        - Geoffroy's red-bellied tamarin, Saguinus labiatus labiatus
        - Gray's red-bellied tamarin, Saguinus labiatus rufiventer
        - Thomas's red-bellied tamarin, Saguinus labiatus thomasi
      - Emperor tamarin, Saguinus imperator
        - Black-chinned emperor tamarin, Saguinus imperator imperator
        - Bearded emperor tamarin, Saguinus imperator subgrisescens
      - Mottle-faced tamarin, Saguinus inustus
  - Genus Leontocebus
    - Black-mantled tamarin, Leontocebus nigricollis
      - Spix's black-mantle tamarin, Leontocebus nigricollis nigricollis
      - Graells's tamarin, Leontocebus nigricollis graellsi
      - Hernández-Camacho's black-mantle tamarin, Leontocebus nigricollis hernandezi
    - Brown-mantled tamarin, Leontocebus fuscicollis
      - Avila Pires' saddle-back tamarin, Leontocebus fuscicollis avilapiresi
      - Spix's saddle-back tamarin, Leontocebus fuscicollis fuscicollis
      - Mura's saddleback tamarin, Leontocebus fuscicollis mura
      - Lako's saddleback tamarin, Leontocebus fuscicollis primitivus
    - Andean saddle-back tamarin, Leontocebus leucogenys
    - Lesson's saddle-back tamarin, Leontocebus fuscus
    - Cruz Lima's saddle-back tamarin, Leontocebus cruzlimai
    - Weddell's saddle-back tamarin, Leontocebus weddelli
      - Weddell's tamarin, Leontocebus weddelli weddelli
      - Crandall's saddle-back tamarin, Leontocebus weddelli crandalli
      - White-mantled tamarin, Leontocebus weddelli melanoleucus
    - Golden-mantled tamarin, Leontocebus tripartitus
    - Illiger's saddle-back tamarin, Leontocebus illigeri
    - Red-mantled saddle-back tamarin, Leontocebus lagonotus
    - Geoffroy's saddle-back tamarin, Leontocebus nigrifrons
  - Genus Leontopithecus
    - Golden lion tamarin, Leontopithecus rosalia
    - Golden-headed lion tamarin, Leontopithecus chrysomelas
    - Black lion tamarin, Leontopithecus chrysopygus
    - Superagui lion tamarin, Leontopithecus caissara
  - †Genus Patasola
    - †Patasola magdalenae
  - †Genus Micodon
    - †Micodon kiotensis
  - Genus Callimico
    - Goeldi's marmoset, Callimico goeldii
  - Genus Mico
    - Silvery marmoset, Mico argentatus
    - Roosmalens' dwarf marmoset, Mico humilis
    - White marmoset, Mico leucippe
    - Black-tailed marmoset, Mico melanurus
    - Schneider's marmoset, Mico schneideri
    - Hershkovitz's marmoset, Mico intermedius
    - Emilia's marmoset, Mico emiliae
    - Black-headed marmoset, Mico nigriceps
    - Marca's marmoset, Mico marcai
    - Santarem marmoset, Mico humeralifer
    - Gold-and-white marmoset, Mico chrysoleucos
    - Maués marmoset, Mico mauesi
    - Sateré marmoset, Mico saterei
    - Rio Acarí marmoset, Mico acariensis
    - Rondon's marmoset, Mico rondoni
    - Munduruku marmoset, Mico munduruku
  - Genus Cebuella
    - Western pygmy marmoset, Cebuella pygmaea
    - Eastern pygmy marmoset, Cebuella niveiventris
  - Genus Callithrix
    - Common marmoset, Callithrix jacchus
    - Black-tufted marmoset, Callithrix penicillata
    - Wied's marmoset, Callithrix kuhlii
    - White-headed marmoset, Callithrix geoffroyi
    - Buffy-tufted marmoset, Callithrix aurita
    - Buffy-headed marmoset, Callithrix flaviceps
