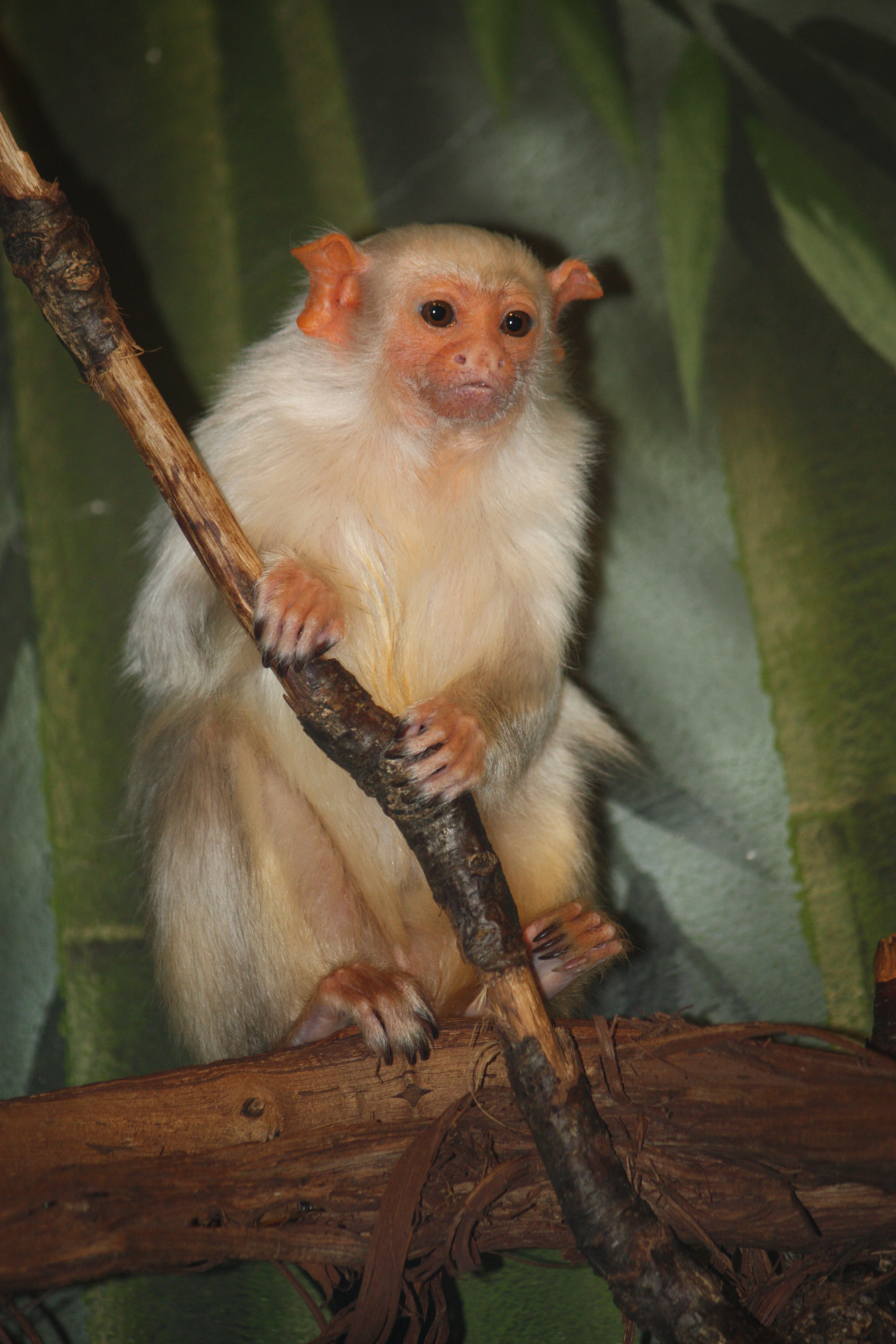
- Silvery marmoset at the Bronx Zoo, New York City.

Conservation status
- Least Concern (IUCN 3.1)

Scientific classification
- Kingdom: Animalia
- Phylum: Chordata
- Class: Mammalia
- Order: Primates
- Family: Callitrichidae
- Genus: Mico
- Species: M. argentatus

Binomial name
- Mico argentatus (Linnaeus, 1766)
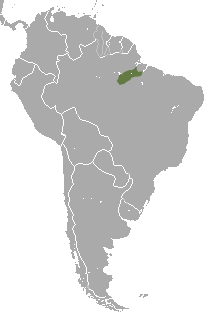
- Silvery marmoset range

Synonyms
- Callithrix argentata

= Silvery marmoset =

Species of New World monkey

The silvery marmoset (Mico argentatus) is a New World monkey that lives in the eastern Amazon Rainforest in Brazil.

The fur of the silvery marmoset is colored whitish silver-grey except for a dark tail. Remarkable are its naked, flesh-colored ears which stand out from the skin. They reach a size of 18 to 28 cm (7.1 to 11.0 in) and weigh from 300 to 400 g (11 to 14 oz).

Silvery marmosets are diurnal and arboreal, using their claws to climb trees. Originally rain forest inhabitants, plantations have caused them to expand their range. They spend the night in tree hollows or in very close vegetation. They live together in small groups and mark their territory with scent glands, driving out intruders by shouting or by facial expressions (lowered brows and guarded lips).

The diet of the silvery marmosets predominantly consists of tree sap. To a lesser extent, they also eat bird eggs, fruit, insects, and small vertebrates.

After a 145-day gestation period, the female bears two (or rarely three) offspring. As is the case for many callitrichids, the father and the other group members take part with the raising of the offspring. Within six months the young are weaned, with full maturity coming at about two years of age.

Studies show that Silvery Marmosets prefer secondary growth forests and edge growth forests due to some of the benefits that the habitat presents such as an abundance of insect prey and dense vegetation.
