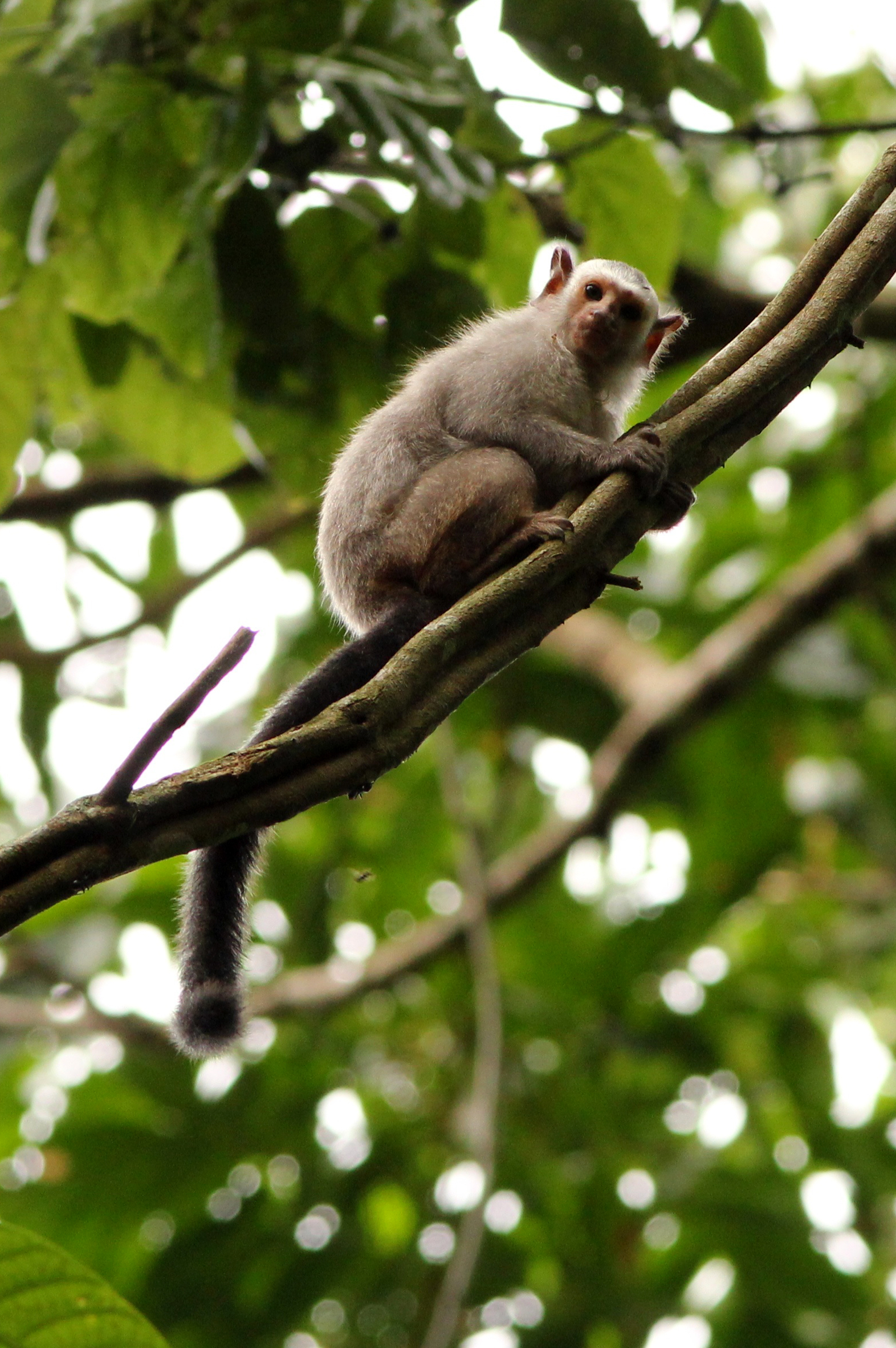

Conservation status
- Least Concern (IUCN 3.1)

Scientific classification
- Kingdom: Animalia
- Phylum: Chordata
- Class: Mammalia
- Order: Primates
- Family: Callitrichidae
- Genus: Mico
- Species: M. emiliae

Binomial name
- Mico emiliae (Thomas, 1920)
- Geographic range in South America

= Emilia's marmoset =

Species of New World monkey

The Emilia's marmoset (Mico emiliae), also known as Snethlage's marmoset, is a marmoset endemic to Brazil. It is found only in the Brazilian states of Pará and Mato Grosso. It was named to honour German-born Brazilian ornithologist Emilie Snethlage.
