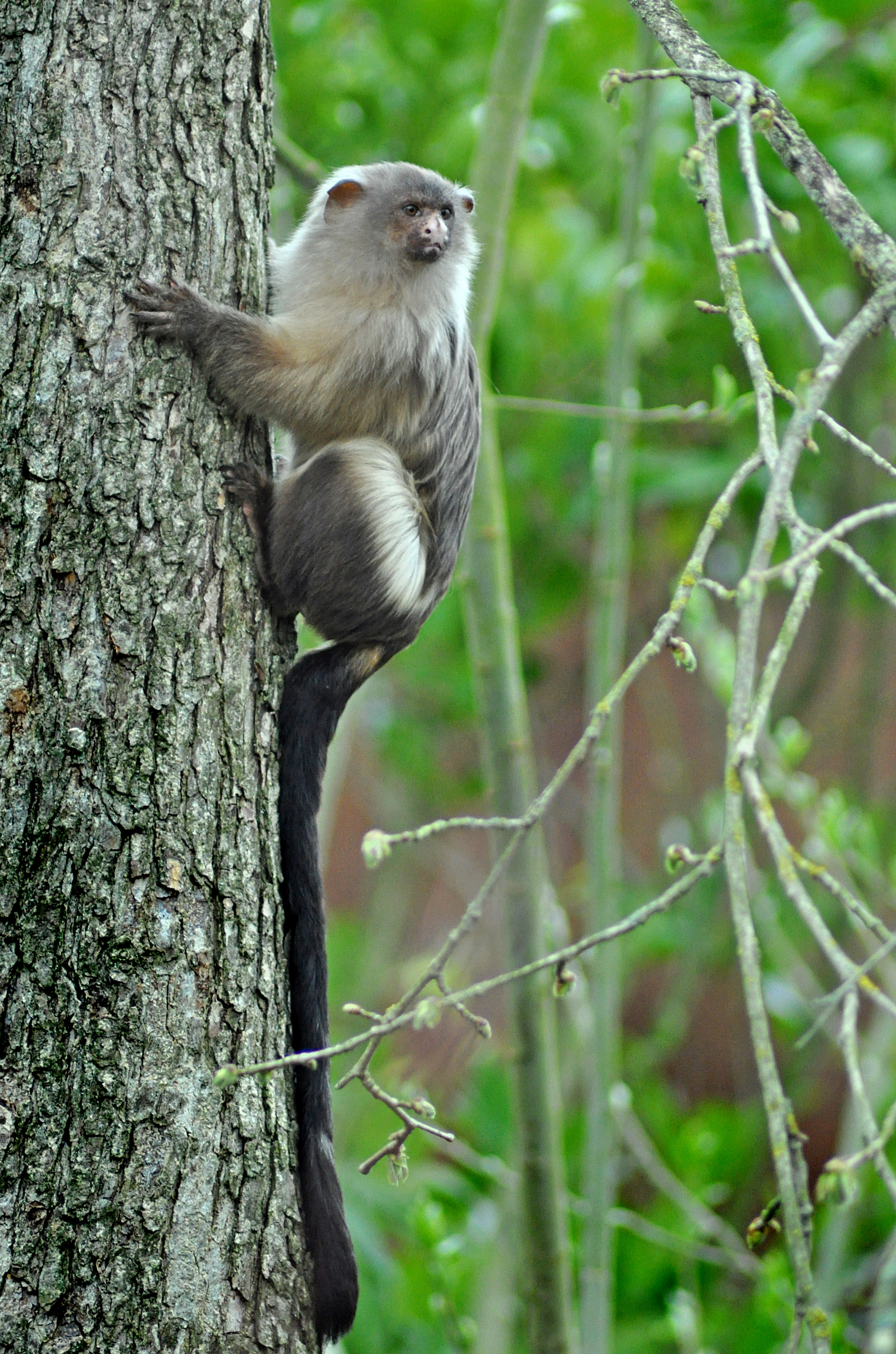
- Black-tailed marmoset

Conservation status
- Near Threatened (IUCN 3.1)

Scientific classification
- Kingdom: Animalia
- Phylum: Chordata
- Class: Mammalia
- Infraclass: Placentalia
- Order: Primates
- Family: Callitrichidae
- Genus: Mico
- Species: M. melanurus

Binomial name
- Mico melanurus (É. Geoffroy, 1812)
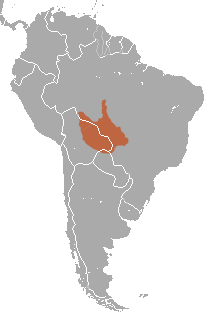
- Black-tailed marmoset range

Synonyms
- leucomerus Gray, 1846; leukeurin Natterer in Pelzeln, 1883; Callithrix argentata melanura Geoffroy, 1812; Callithrix melanura Geoffroy, 1812

= Black-tailed marmoset =

Species of New World monkey

The black-tailed marmoset (Mico melanurus) is a species of New World monkey from central South America, where it ranges from the south-central Amazon in Brazil, south through the Pantanal and eastern Bolivia, to the Chaco in far northern Paraguay. It is the southernmost member of the genus Mico and the only species where most of its range is outside the Amazon.

The black-tailed marmoset is dark brown with paler foreparts and a black tail. Unlike most of its relatives, it has a striking white or yellow-white stripe that extends down its thigh. Its ears are naked, flesh-colored and stand out from the fur. They reach a size of 18 to 28 cm and weigh from 300 to 400 g.

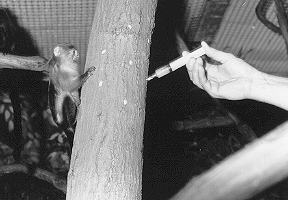
A female Black-tailed marmoset is being given an antibiotic gum arabic solution without being removed from her family, who are watching the procedure.

Black-tailed marmosets are diurnal and arboreal, using their claws to climb trees. Originally rain forest inhabitants, plantations have caused them to expanded them their range. They spend the night in tree hollows or in very close vegetation. They live together in small groups and mark their territory with scent glands, driving out intruders by shouting or by facial expressions, including lowered brows and guarded lips.

The diet of the black-tailed marmoset predominantly consists of tree sap. To a lesser extent, they also eat bird eggs, fruits, insects, and small vertebrates.

After a 145-day gestation period, the female bears two (or rarely three) offspring. As is the case for many callitrichines, the father and the other group members take part with the raising of the offspring. Within six months the young are weaned, with full maturity coming at about two years of age.
