= Marc van Roosmalen =

Dutch-Brazilian primatologist

- Born: 23 June 1947 (age 79); Tilburg, Netherlands
- Education: University of Amsterdam
- Occupation: Primatologist
- Years active: 1976–present
- Known for: Fieldwork in the Amazon; Science writing
- Notable work: Live from the Amazon - On the Path of Evolution; A Pictorial Field Guide to All Known Woody Plants of the Amazon
- Spouse: Antônia Vivian Silva Garcia
- Children: Vasco Marcus; Tomas
- Parent(s): Franciscus L.W. van Roosmalen; Maria van Remmerden
- Website: Official website

Marc van Roosmalen (born 23 June 1947) is a Dutch-Brazilian primatologist. He was elected as one of the "Heroes for the Planet" by Time magazine in 2000. His research has led to the identification of several new monkey species, as well as other mammals and plants, although some of these identifications are challenged. He is also an activist in the protection of the Brazilian rainforest. Van Roosmalen was awarded the honour of officer in the Order of the Golden Ark by Prince Bernhard of the Netherlands in 1997.

== Career ==
Van Roosmalen studied biology at the University of Amsterdam and did four years of doctoral fieldwork beginning in 1976 studying the red-faced spider monkey in Suriname. He later did two more years of work in French Guiana, following which he published the book Fruits of the Guianan Flora. In 1986 he was hired by the INPA (Brazilian National Institute of Amazonian Research, where he initially thrived. During this period, he launched a non-governmental organization focused on creating wilderness preserves in the deep Amazon. He became a naturalized Brazilian citizen in 1997. Marc considers Alfred Russel Wallace his icon and is an advocate of Wallace's "river barrier" hypothesis that the major rivers of the Amazon basin serve as barriers that create separate genetically distinct evolutionary regions.

== Personal life ==
Marc grew up in Tilburg, a city in the southern part of the Netherlands. His father was a chemist. He met and married his first wife while living in Utrecht, where he had moved for school at age 17. They had two sons. In early 2008, he divorced his first wife and married his Brazilian girlfriend.

== Selected publications ==
- A Pictorial Field Guide to the Woody Plants of the Amazon Scholars' Press, OmniScriptum, July 2021, Vol. I, Fruit Plates, 320p. Paperback, ISBN 978-6138932987
- A Pictorial Field Guide to the Woody Plants of the Amazon Scholars' Press, OmniScriptum, July 2021, Vol. II, ACANTHACEAE - BURSERACEAE, 381p. Paperback, ISBN 978-6138933625
- A Pictorial Field Guide to the Woody Plants of the Amazon Scholars' Press, OmniScriptum, July 2021, Vol. III, CACTACEAE - GESNERIACEAE, 323p. Paperback, ISBN 978-6138946014
- A Pictorial Field Guide to the Woody Plants of the Amazon Scholars' Press, OmniScriptum, July 2021, Vol. IV, GNETACEAE - LECYTHIDACEAE, 229p. Paperback, ISBN 978-6138946021
- A Pictorial Field Guide to the Woody Plants of the Amazon Scholars' Press, OmniScriptum, July 2021, Vol. V, LEGUMINOSAE, 316p. Paperback, ISBN 978-6138946069
- A Pictorial Field Guide to the Woody Plants of the Amazon Scholars' Press, OmniScriptum, July 2021, Vol. VI, LILIACEAE - MORACEAE, 247p. Paperback, ISBN 978-6138946076
- A Pictorial Field Guide to the Woody Plants of the Amazon Scholars' Press, OmniScriptum, July 2021, Vol. VII, MYRISTICACEAE - ROSACEAE, 223p. Paperback, ISBN 978-6138946083
- A Pictorial Field Guide to the Woody Plants of the Amazon Scholars' Press, OmniScriptum, July 2021, Vol. VIII, RUBIACEAE - SAPINDACEAE, 184p. Paperback, ISBN 978-6138946113
- A Pictorial Field Guide to the Woody Plants of the Amazon Scholars' Press, OmniScriptum, July 2021, Vol. IX, SAPOTACEAE - VOCHYSIACEAE, 270p. Paperback, ISBN 978-6138948704
- Wild Fruits from the Amazon, CreateSpace Independent Publishing Platform, 2013, Vol. I, Plates, Paperback, ISBN 978-1493776160
- Wild Fruits from the Amazon, CreateSpace Independent Publishing Platform, 2015, Vol. II, Plates, Paperback, ISBN 978-1516879533
- Wild Fruits from the Amazon, CreateSpace Independent Publishing Platform, 2017, Vol. III, Plates, Paperback, ISBN 978-1542831451
- Barefoot through the Amazon – On the Path of Evolution, CreateSpace Independent Publishing Platform, 2013, 550p., Paperback, ISBN 978-1482578249
- A Shaman’s Apprentice - Traditional Healing in the Brazilian Amazon, CreateSpace Independent Publishing Platform, 2013, Vol. III, 115p., Paperback ISBN 978-1484034415
- On the Origin of Allopatric Primate Species and the Principle of Metachromic Bleaching, CreateSpace Independent Publishing Platform, 2013, ISBN 978-1494330347, co-authored by Dr. Tomas van Roosmalen
- Distributions and Phylogeography of Neotropical Primates, CreateSpace Independent Publishing Platform, 2014, Paperback, ISBN 978-1494852535, co-authored by Dr. Tomas van Roosmalen
- On the Origin of Allopatric Primate Species, 2016, Biodiversity Journal, vol. 7, no. 1, p. 117-198. ISSN 2039-0394 (Print Edition) ISSN 2039-0408 (Online Edition), co-authored with Tomas van Roosmalen
- Live from the Amazon - On the Path of Evolution, CreateSpace Independent Publishing Platform, 2015, 440p., Paperback, ISBN 978-1517514631
- Black Gold: Pre-Columbian Farming on Terra Preta Anthrosol in the Amazon, CreateSpace Independent Publishing Platform, 2016, 158p., Paperback, ISBN 978-1534790148
- Live from the Amazon - On the Path of Evolution; A Personal Account of Amazonian Human and Natural History, Lambert Academic Publishing (LAP), April 2020, 667p. Paperback, ISBN 978-6202522069
- Man's Territorial Primate Factor - Evolutionary Roots of Tribalism in Human Societies, Lambert Academic Publishing (LAP), March 2020, 253p. Paperback, ISBN 978-6200536716
- Blootsvoets door de Amazone - De Evolutie op het Spoor, Uitgeverij Bert Bakker, Amsterdam, 2008, 408p. Paperback, ISBN 978-9035133105
- Tropenkolder - Belevenissen in de jungle van een Held van de Planeet, Uitgeverij Bert Bakker, Amsterdam, 2010, 312p. Paperback, ISBN 9789035135550
- Darwin in een Notendop, Uitgeverij Bert Bakker, Amsterdam, 2009, 125p. Paperback, ISBN 9789035134188

== Controversies ==
In 2002, he was fined by the IBAMA (Brazilian Ministry of the Environment's Enforcement Agency) for illegal transportation of monkeys and orchids from the unexplored Amazonian region of Serra do Aracá. In April 2003, Van Roosmalen was fired from his senior scientist job with the federal institute INPA for alleged 'illegal' export abroad of environmental genetic samples.

In 2007, he was arrested by the Brazilian government for illegally keeping orphaned monkeys in a monkey refuge at his house in Manaus and for misappropriation of Brazilian public funds. He was sentenced to 14+ years in prison. Van Roosmalen claims that he over and over applied for permits for his monkey preserve. He was placed in the notorious Raimundo Vidal Pessoa Penitentiary in Manaus-AM. At one point Van Roosmalen shared a cell with two violent crack addicts whose drug debts he had to pay to stay alive. After three months in 'hell on earth', he was set free on appeal.

Van Roosmalen told a Wired news reporter that he has a video of two ex-policemen knocking on his door immediately after tucking revolvers into their pants. Believing that he would be killed if he stayed, he and his partner Vivian Garcia went on the run to the Caribbean Island of Margarita with no plans to return to their home in Manaus as of August 2007. In exile, on contract with a Dutch publishing house, Van Roosmalen began to write popular-scientific books about his life in the Amazon. In December 2008, he was fully absolved from all alleged "crimes against Mother Nature" by the Supreme Court in Brasilia-DF.

In 2010, Marc van Roosmalen received a grant from the Scholar Rescue Fund of the Institute of International Education in NY. He was appointed as a Distinguished Scholar in Residence for the 2010-2011 academic year at Bard College.

Van Roosmalen's dwarf porcupine and Van Roosmalen's dwarf marmoset are discovered by and named after him. He named the Prince Bernhard's titi after the late Prince Bernhard of the Netherlands, co-founder and former president of the WWF.
