= List of primates =

Animals in mammal order Primates

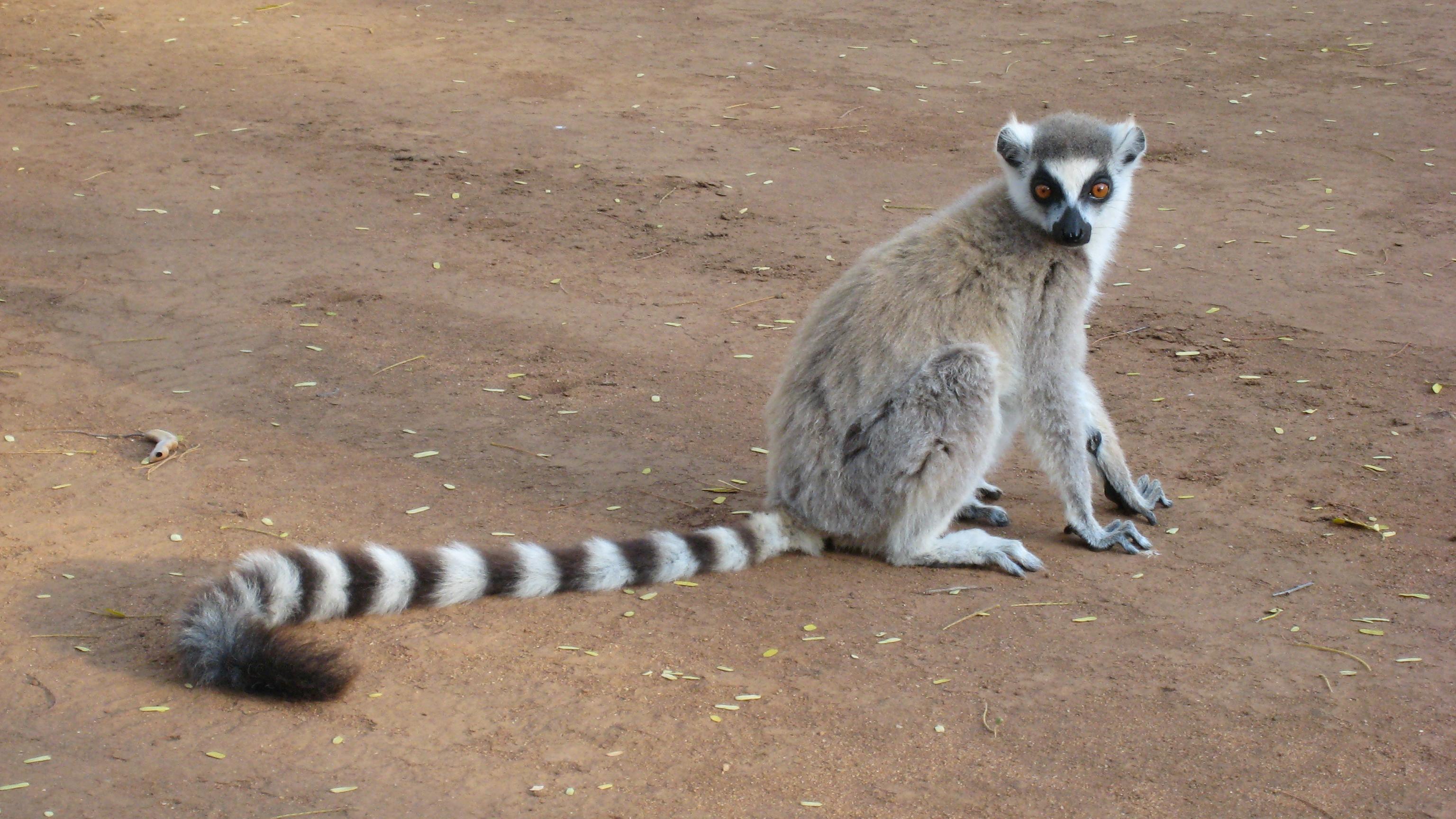
Ring-tailed lemur (Lemur catta)

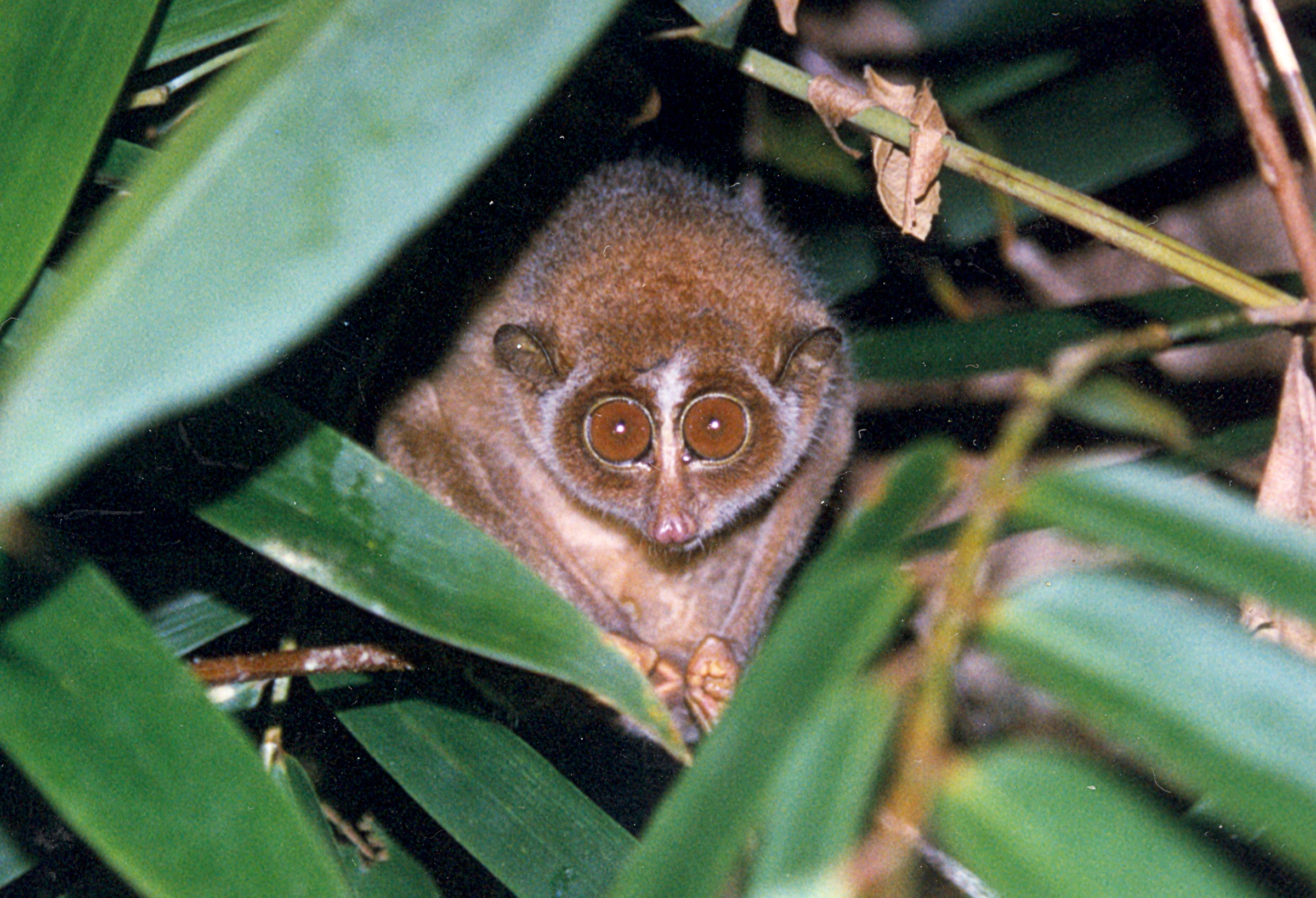
Red slender loris (Loris tardigradus)

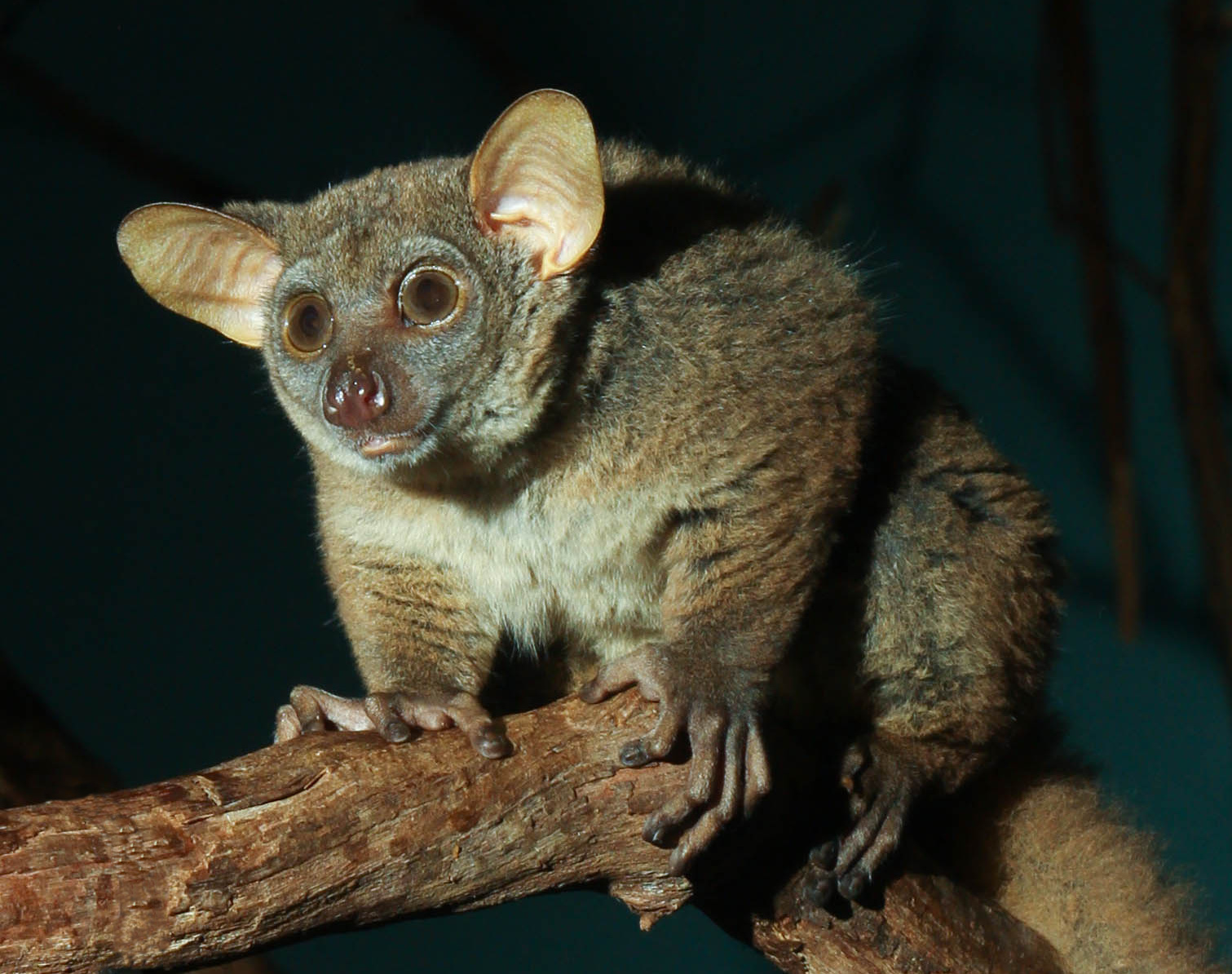
Northern greater galago (Otolemur garnettii)

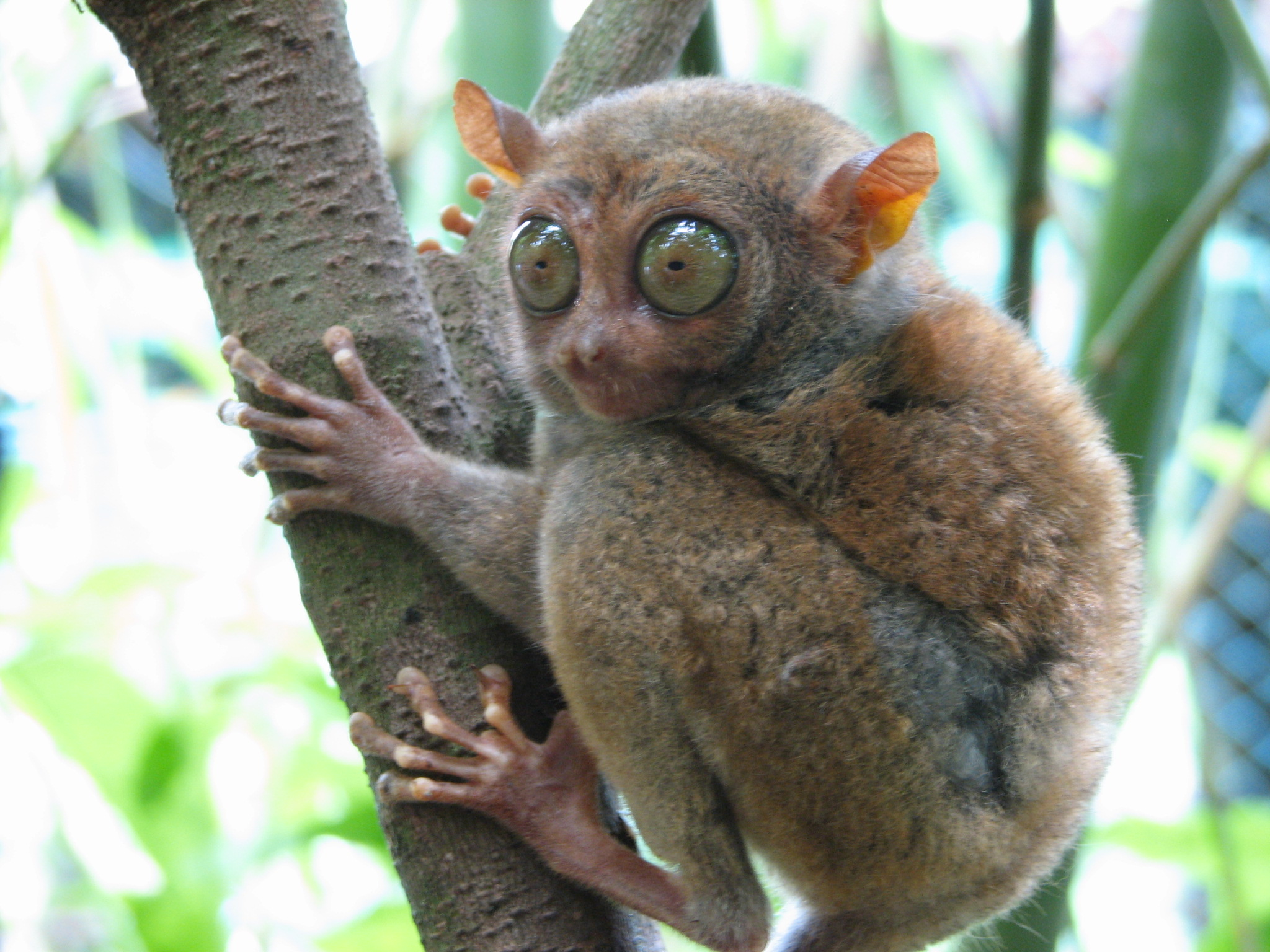
Philippine tarsier (Carlito syrichta)

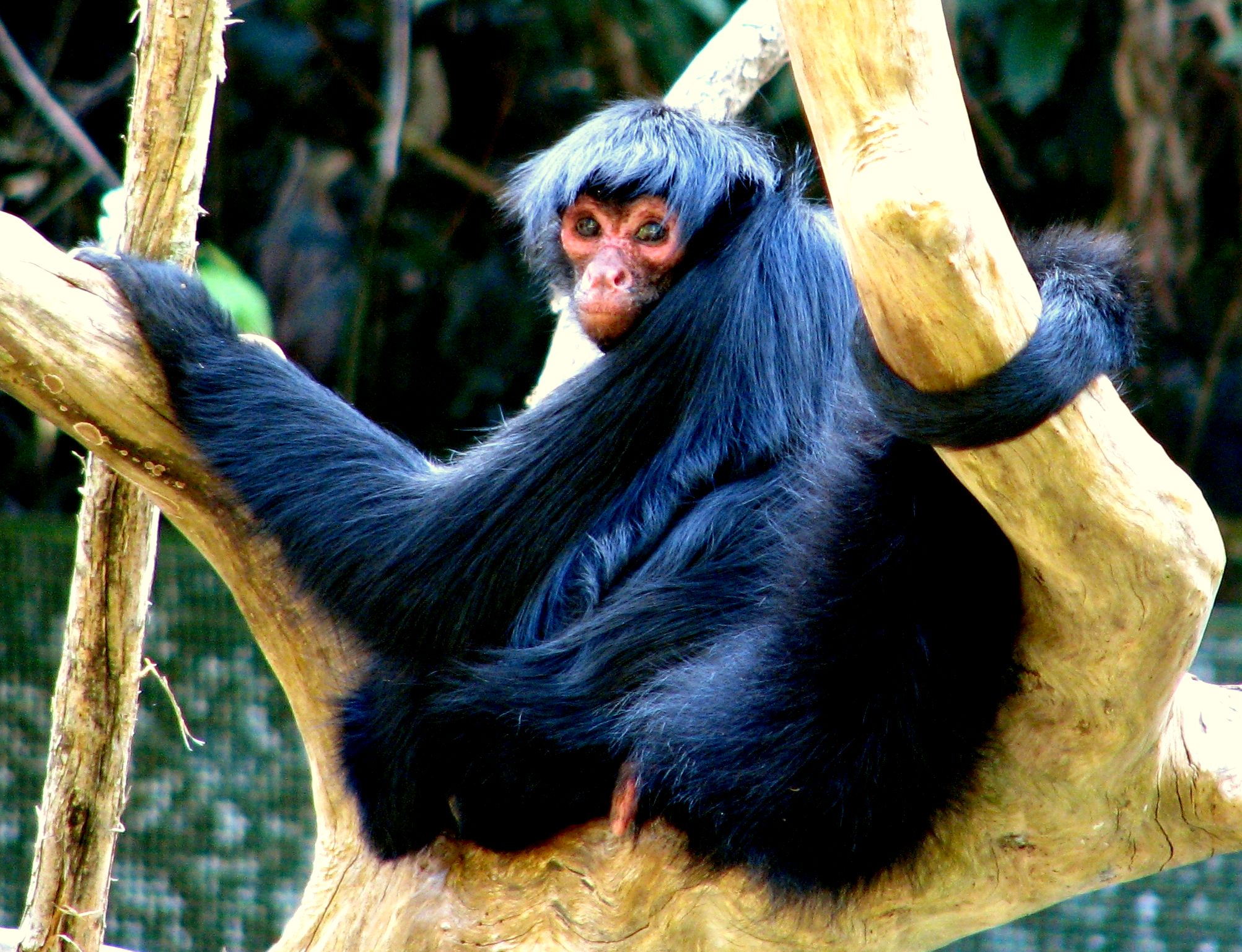
Red-faced spider monkey (Ateles paniscus)

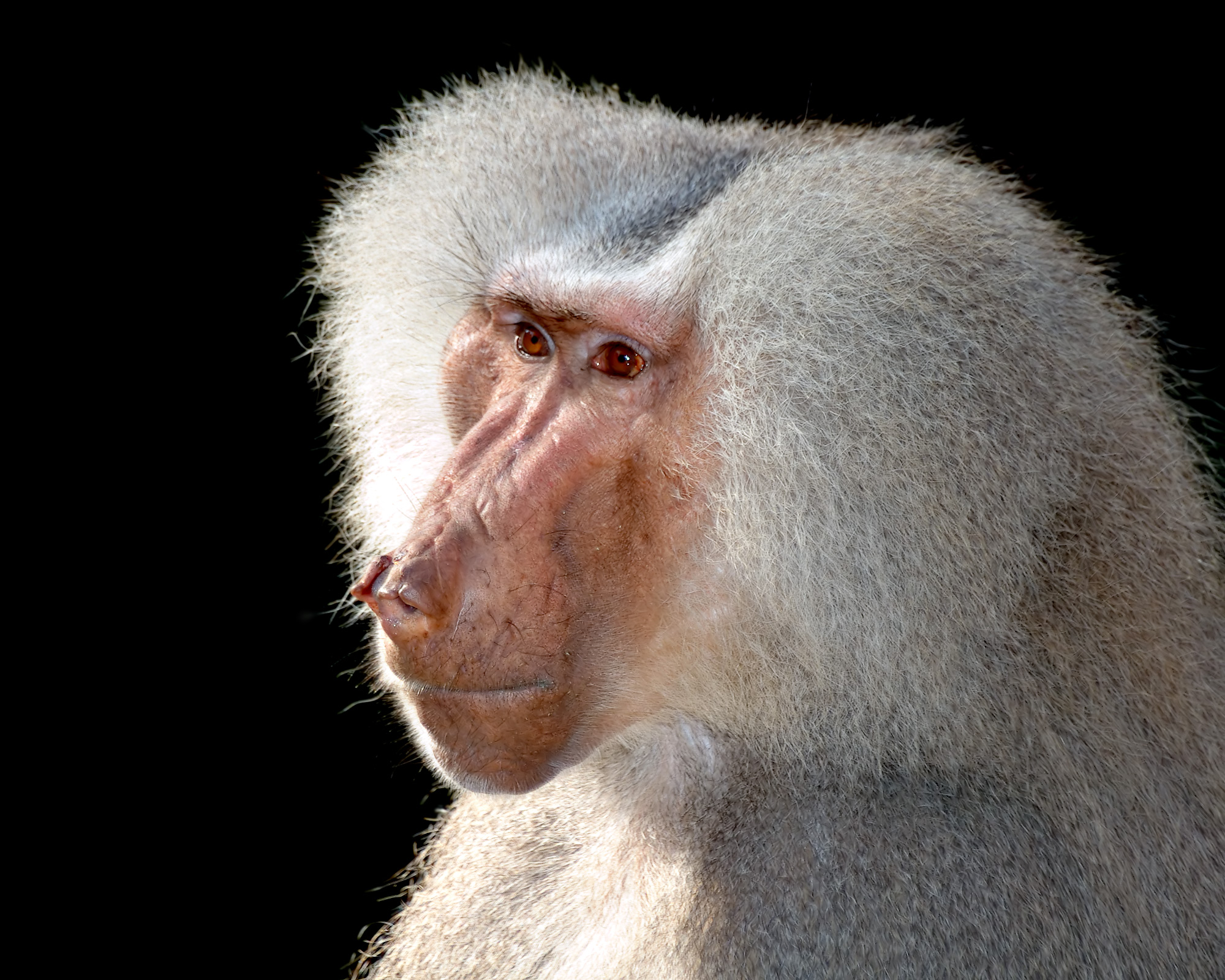
Hamadryas baboon (Papio hamadryas)

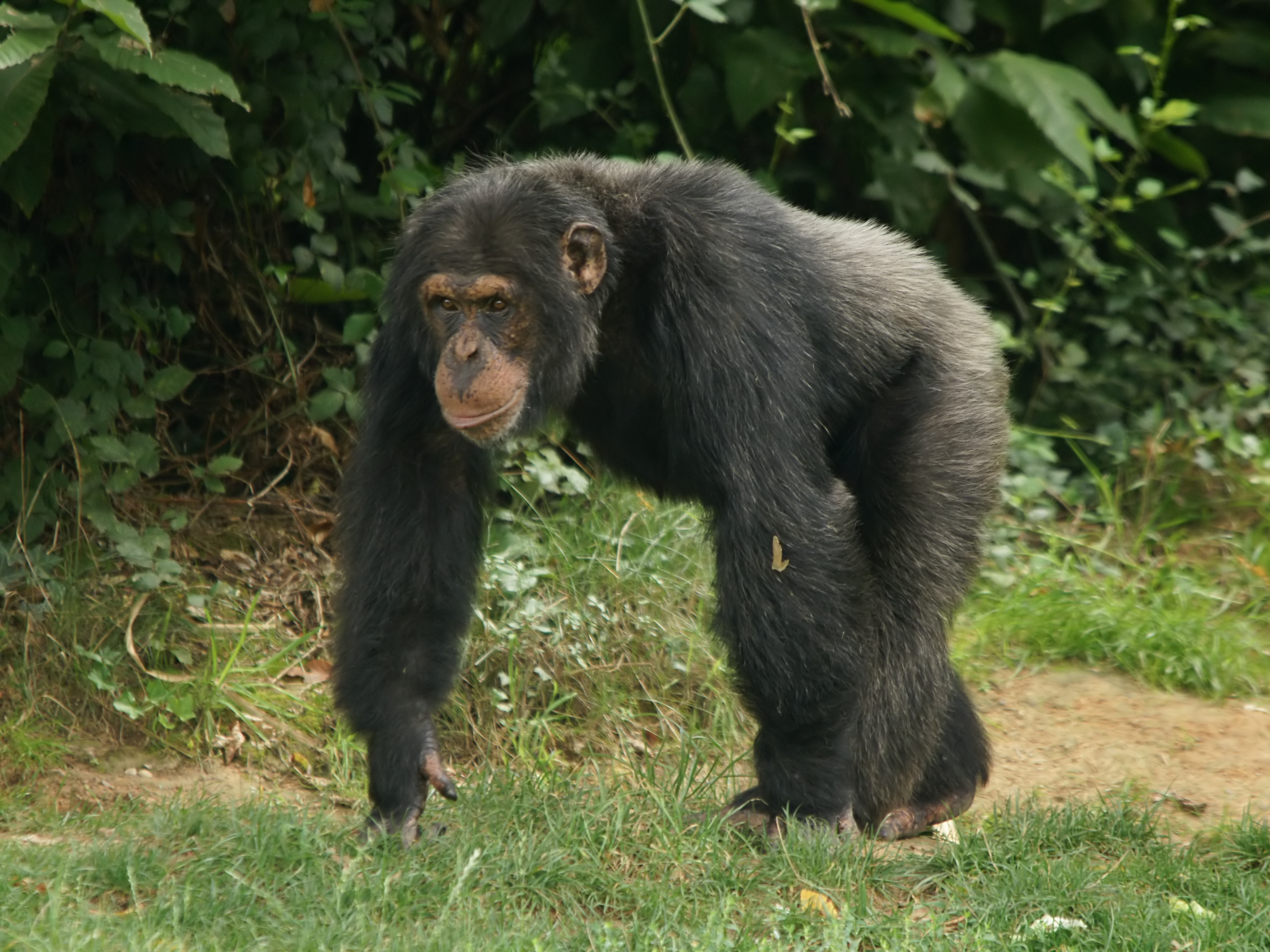
Chimpanzee (Pan troglodytes)

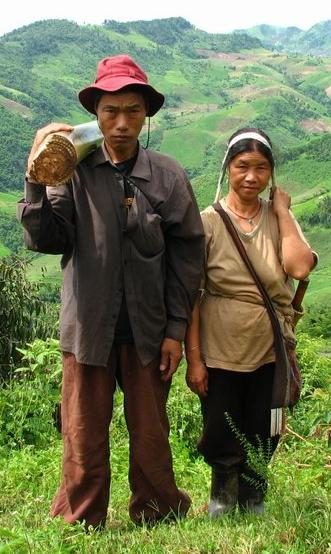
Humans (Homo sapiens)

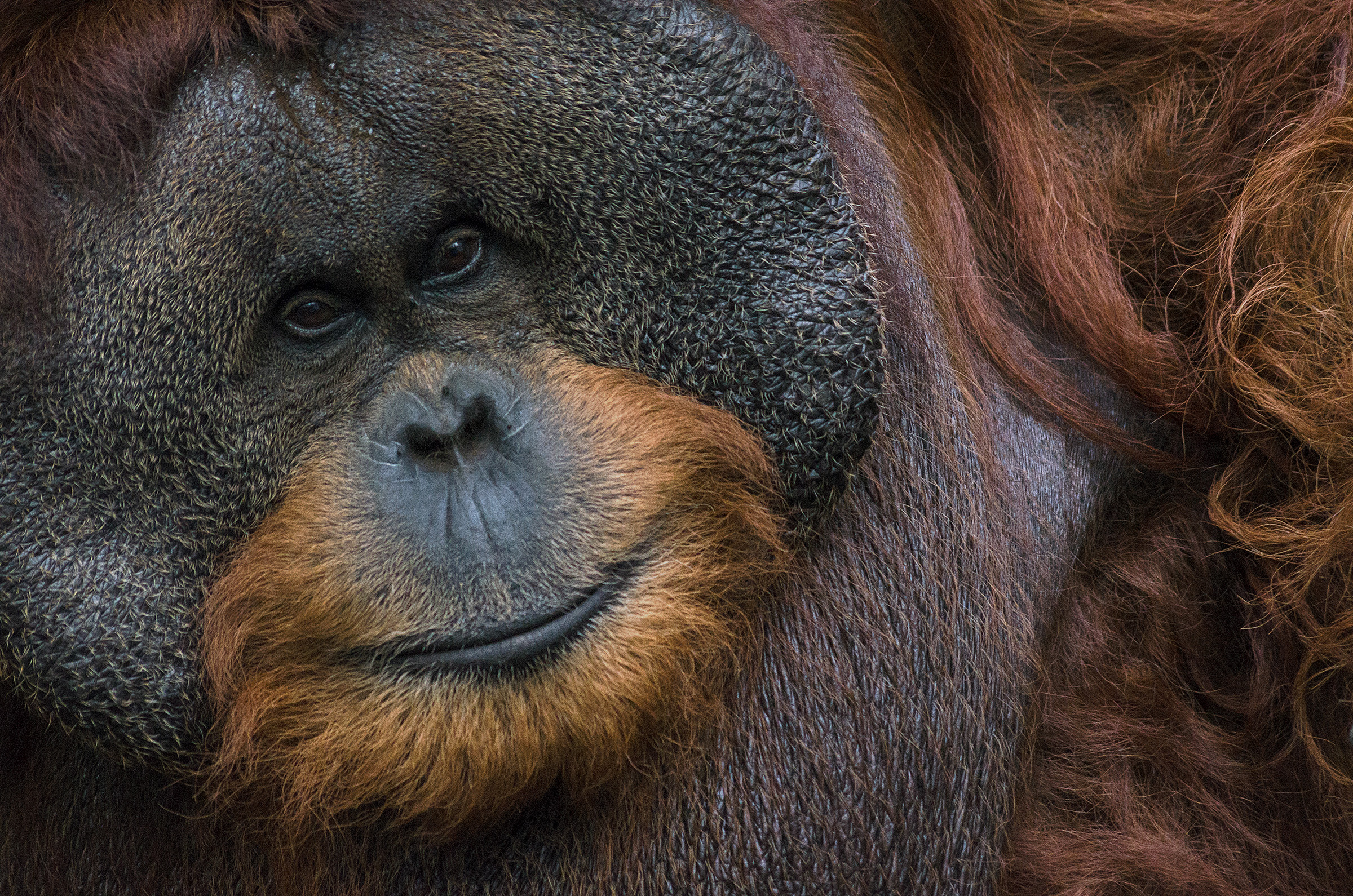
Bornean orangutan (Pongo pygmaeus)

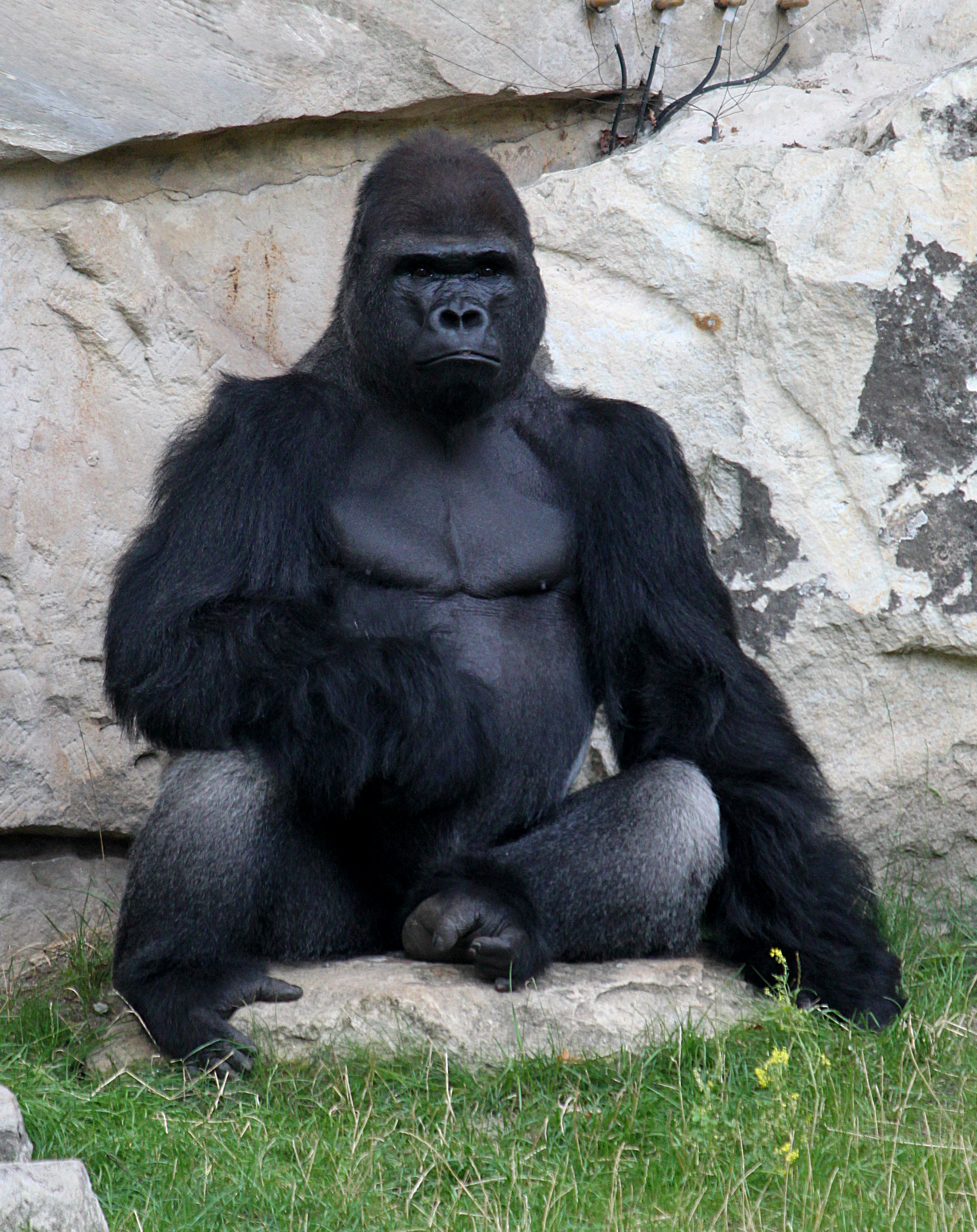
Western gorilla (Gorilla gorilla)

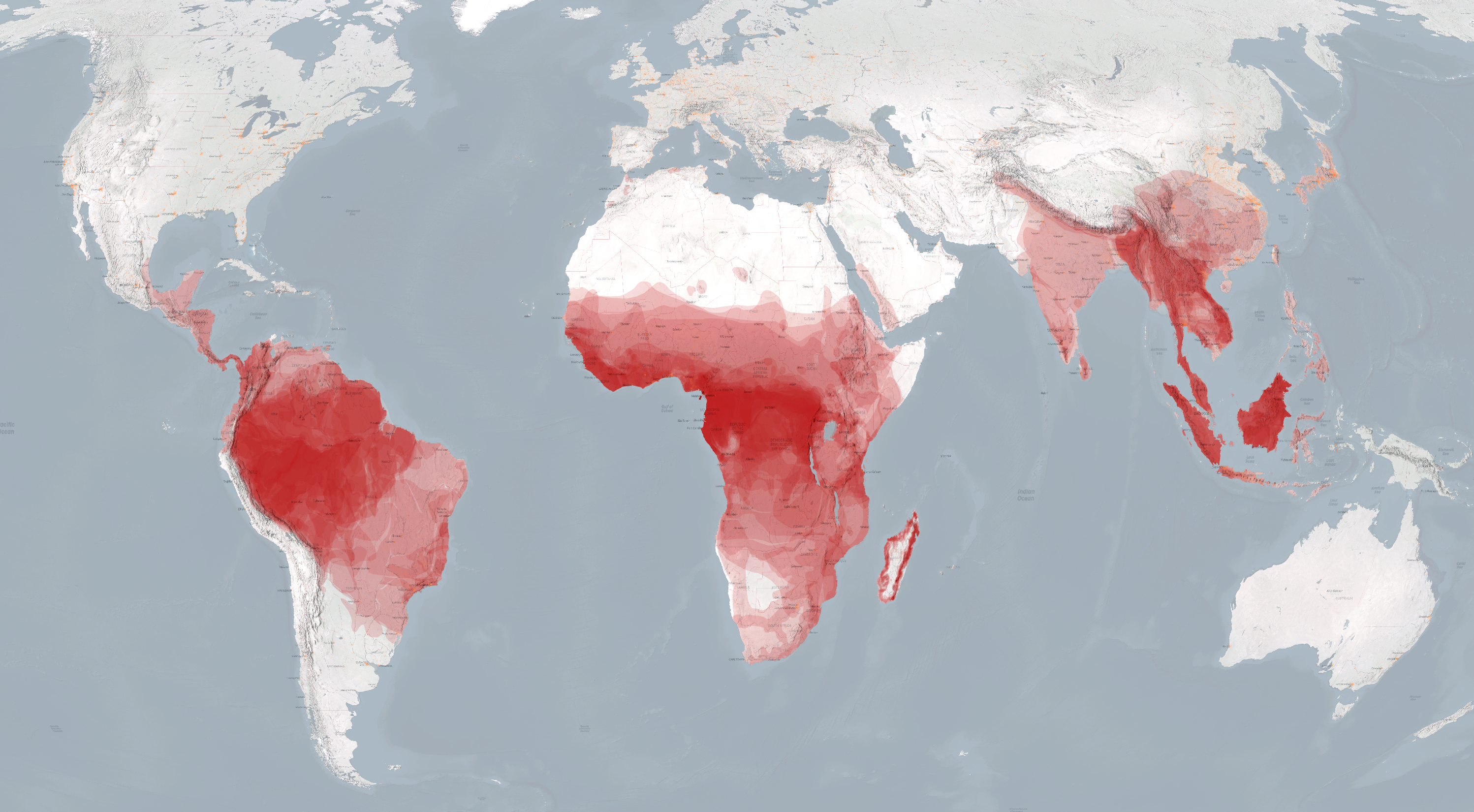
Range and density of non-human primates

Primates is a diverse order of placental mammals which includes monkeys, lemurs, galagos, lorisids, tarsiers, and apes (including humans). Members of this order are called primates. The order currently comprises 505 extant species, which are grouped into 81 genera. The majority of primates live in South and Central America, Africa, and southern and Southeast Asia, in a variety of habitats, particularly forests but also including grasslands, savannas, shrublands, wetlands, deserts, and rocky areas. The exception is humans, which have spread worldwide to every biome. Primates come in a variety of body plans but typically feature large brains, a shoulder girdle allowing a large degree of movement in the shoulder joint, dexterous hands, and tails, sometimes prehensile. They range in size from Margot Marsh's mouse lemur, at 8 cm (3 in) plus a 11 cm (4 in) tail, to the eastern gorilla, at 196 cm (77 in), not including limbs. Primates are also the most intelligent animals and non-human primates are recorded to use tools, communicate with gestures and vocalizations, and have complex social systems.

Primates is divided into two suborders: Haplorrhini and Strepsirrhini. The suborders are further subdivided into clades and families. Haplorrhini contains nine families in four major clades: Cercopithecoidea, containing the Old World monkeys of the family Cercopithecidae; Hominoidea, containing the great apes of the family Hominidae and the gibbons of the family Hylobatidae; Platyrrhines, or New World monkeys, divided into the families Aotidae, Atelidae, Callitrichidae, Cebidae, and Pitheciidae and containing night, howler, spider, woolly, capuchin, squirrel, and saki monkeys, marmosets, and tamarins; and Tarsiiformes, containing the tarsier family Tarsiidae. Strepsirrhini is split between two clades: Lemuroidea, divided into the families Cheirogaleidae (dwarf and mouse lemurs), Daubentoniidae (the aye-aye), Indriidae (wooly lemurs, sifakas, and indri), Lemuridae (lemurs), and Lepilemuridae (sportive lemurs); and Lorisoidea, split between the galago family Galagidae and the loris family Lorisidae. The exact organization of the species is not fixed, with many recent proposals made based on molecular phylogenetic analysis. Over 200 species, or more than 40 percent of all primates, are considered endangered or critically endangered.

== Conventions ==
The author citation for the species or genus is given after the scientific name; parentheses around the author citation indicate that this was not the original taxonomic placement. Range maps are provided wherever possible; if a range map is not available, a description of the collective range of species in that genera is provided. Ranges are based on the International Union for Conservation of Nature (IUCN) Red List of Threatened Species unless otherwise noted.

== Classification ==
The order Primates consists of 505 extant species belonging to 81 genera. This does not include hybrid species or extinct prehistoric species. Modern molecular studies indicate that the 81 genera can be grouped into 16 families; these families are divided between two named suborders and are grouped in those suborders into named clades, and some of these families are subdivided into named subfamilies.

Suborder Haplorrhini

- Superfamily Cercopithecoidea
  - Family Cercopithecidae (Old World monkeys)
    - Subfamily Cercopithecinae (cercopithecine monkeys): 13 genera, 78 species
    - Subfamily Colobinae (leaf-eating monkeys): 10 genera, 80 species
- Superfamily Hominoidea (apes)
  - Family Hominidae (hominids)
    - Subfamily Homininae (African hominids): 3 genera, 5 species
    - Subfamily Ponginae (Asian hominids): 1 genus, 3 species
  - Family Hylobatidae (gibbons): 4 genera, 20 species
- Parvorder Platyrrhines (New World monkeys)
  - Family Aotidae (night monkeys): 1 genus, 11 species
  - Family Atelidae
    - Subfamily Alouattinae (howler monkeys): 1 genus, 12 species
    - Subfamily Atelinae (spider and wooly monkeys): 3 genera, 11 species
  - Family Callitrichidae (marmosets and tamarins): 7 genera, 43 species
  - Family Cebidae
    - Subfamily Cebinae (capuchin monkeys): 2 genera, 11 species
    - Subfamily Saimiriinae (squirrel monkeys): 1 genus, 7 species
  - Family Pitheciidae
    - Subfamily Callicebinae (titi monkeys): 3 genera, 33 species
    - Subfamily Pitheciinae (saki monkeys and uakaris: 3 genera, 25 species
- Infraorder Tarsiiformes
  - Family Tarsiidae (tarsiers): 3 genera, 14 species

Suborder Strepsirrhini

- Superfamily Lemuroidea (lemurs)
  - Family Cheirogaleidae (dwarf and mouse lemurs): 5 genera, 41 species
  - Family Daubentoniidae (aye-aye): 1 genus, 1 species
  - Family Indriidae (woolly lemurs, sifakas, and indri): 3 genera, 19 species
  - Family Lemuridae (lemurs): 5 genera, 21 species
  - Family Lepilemuridae (sportive lemurs): 1 genus, 25 species
- Superfamily Lorisoidea
  - Family Galagidae (galagos): 6 genera, 19 species
  - Family Lorisidae
    - Subfamily Lorisinae (lorises): 3 genera, 11 species
    - Subfamily Perodicticinae (angwantibos and pottos): 2 genera, 5 species

- Primates
  - Haplorhini
    - Simiiformes
      - Catarrhini
        - Hominoidea
          - Hominidae
          - Hylobatidae
        - Cercopithecoidea
          Cercopithecidae
      - Platyrrhini
        - Aotidae
        - Atelidae
        - Callitrichidae
        - Cebidae
        - Pitheciidae
    - Tarsiiformes
      Tarsiidae
  - Strepsirrhini
    - Lemuriformes
      - Lemuroidea
        - Cheirogaleidae
        - Daubentoniidae
        - Indriidae
        - Lemuridae
        - Lepilemuridae
      - Lorisoidea
        - Galagidae
        - Lorisidae

== Primates ==
The following classification is based on the taxonomy described by Mammal Species of the World (2005), with augmentation by generally accepted proposals made since using molecular phylogenetic analysis, as supported by both the IUCN and the American Society of Mammalogists.

=== Suborder Haplorrhini ===
==== Superfamily Cercopithecoidea ====
===== Family Cercopithecidae =====
Members of the Cercopithecidae family are called cercopithecids, or colloquially Old World monkeys, and include baboons, colobuses, guenons, lutungs, macaques, and other types of monkeys. Cercopithecidae comprises 158 extant species, divided into 23 genera. These genera are grouped into two subfamilies: Cercopithecinae, or cercopithecine monkeys, containing baboon, guenon, macaque, and other monkey species; and Colobinae, or leaf-eating monkeys, containing colobus, lutung, and other monkey species.

Subfamily Cercopithecinae – Gray, 1821 – thirteen genera
Name	Authority and species	Range	Size and ecology
Allenopithecus	Lang, 1923 One species: A. nigroviridis (Allen's swamp monkey)	Central Africa	Size: 33–51 cm (13–20 in) long, plus 35–52 cm (14–20 in) tail Habitat: Forest Diet: Fruit, leaves, and small invertebrates
Allochrocebus (terrestrial guenon)	Elliot, 1913 Three species: A. lhoesti (L'Hoest's monkey, pictured); A. preussi (Preuss's monkey); A. solatus (Sun-tailed monkey)	Central and west-central Africa	Size range: 31–69 cm (12–27 in) long, plus 48–10 cm (19–4 in) tail (L'Hoest's monkey) Habitats: Grassland and forest Diets: Fruit, seeds, shoots, leaves, buds, flowers, mushrooms, and invertebrates
Cercocebus (white-eyelid mangabey)	É Geoffroy, 1812 Seven species: C. agilis (Agile mangabey); C. atys (Sooty mangabey, pictured); C. chrysogaster (Golden-bellied mangabey); C. galeritus (Tana River mangabey); C. lunulatus (White-naped mangabey); C. sanjei (Sanje mangabey); C. torquatus (Collared mangabey)	Equatorial Africa	Size range: 40–80 cm (16–31 in) long, plus 45–100 cm (18–39 in) tail (Golden-bellied mangabey) Habitats: Inland wetlands, forest, shrubland, and savanna Diets: Invertebrates, fruit, leaves, nuts, seeds, nectar, stems, roots, insects, fungi, grass, and small vertebrates
Cercopithecus (guenon)	Linnaeus, 1758 Nineteen species: C. ascanius (Red-tailed monkey); C. campbelli (Campbell's mona monkey); C. cephus (Moustached guenon); C. denti (Dent's mona monkey); C. diana (Diana monkey, pictured); C. erythrogaster (White-throated guenon); C. erythrotis (Red-eared guenon); C. hamlyni (Hamlyn's monkey); C. lomamiensis (Lesula); C. lowei (Lowe's mona monkey); C. mitis (Blue monkey); C. mona (Mona monkey); C. neglectus (De Brazza's monkey); C. nictitans (Greater spot-nosed monkey); C. petaurista (Lesser spot-nosed monkey); C. pogonias (Crested mona monkey); C. roloway (Roloway monkey); C. sclateri (Sclater's guenon); C. wolfi (Wolf's mona monkey)	Sub-Saharan Africa	Size range: 29 cm (11 in) long, plus 57 cm (22 in) tail (Lesser spot-nosed monkey) to 70 cm (28 in) long, plus 109 cm (43 in) tail (Blue monkey) Habitats: Inland wetlands, forest, shrubland, and savanna Diets: Fruit, leaves, seeds, shoots, herbs, invertebrates, flowers, buds, tree gum, birds, bird eggs, and small reptiles
Chlorocebus (vervet monkey)	Gray, 1870 Seven species: C. aethiops (Grivet); C. cynosuros (Malbrouck, pictured); C. djamdjamensis (Bale Mountains vervet); C. dryas (Dryas monkey); C. pygerythrus (Vervet monkey); C. sabaeus (Green monkey); C. tantalus (Tantalus monkey)	Equatorial, eastern, and southern Africa	Size range: 34 cm (13 in) long, plus 44 cm (17 in) tail (Malbrouck) to 83 cm (33 in) long, plus 114 cm (45 in) tail (Tantalus monkey) Habitats: Forest, shrubland, and savanna Diets: Fruit, leaves, flowers, small vertebrates, shoots, stems, roots, insects, bark, gum, eggs, invertebrates, pith, seeds, and mushrooms
Erythrocebus (patas monkey)	Trouessart, 1897 Three species: E. baumstarki (Southern patas monkey); E. patas (Common patas monkey, pictured); E. poliophaeus (Blue Nile patas monkey)	Equatorial and eastern Africa	Size range: 49 cm (19 in) long, plus 43 cm (17 in) tail (Blue Nile patas monkey) to 70 cm (28 in) long, plus 70 cm (28 in) tail (Common patas monkey) Habitats: Grassland, forest, shrubland, and savanna Diets: Fruit, insects, gum, and arthropods, as well as flowers, fruit, seeds, leaves, stems, roots, small vertebrates, and bird eggs
Lophocebus (crested mangabey)	Palmer, 1903 Two species: L. albigena (Grey-cheeked mangabey, pictured); L. aterrimus (Black crested mangabey)	Central Africa	Size range: 44–75 cm (17–30 in) long, plus 57–94 cm (22–37 in) tail (Grey-cheeked mangabey) Habitat: Forest Diets: Fruit and seeds
Macaca (macaque)	Lacépède, 1799 24 species: M. arctoides (Stump-tailed macaque); M. assamensis (Assam macaque); M. brunnescens (Muna-Buton macaque); M. cyclopis (Formosan rock macaque); M. fascicularis (Crab-eating macaque); M. fuscata (Japanese macaque); M. hecki (Heck's macaque); M. leonina (Northern pig-tailed macaque); M. leucogenys (White-cheeked macaque); M. maura (Moor macaque); M. mulatta (Rhesus macaque); M. munzala (Arunachal macaque); M. nemestrina (Southern pig-tailed macaque); M. nigra (Celebes crested macaque); M. nigrescens (Gorontalo macaque); M. ochreata (Booted macaque); M. pagensis (Pagai Island macaque); M. radiata (Bonnet macaque, pictured); M. siberu (Siberut macaque); M. silenus (Lion-tailed macaque); M. sinica (Toque macaque); M. sylvanus (Barbary macaque); M. thibetana (Tibetan macaque); M. tonkeana (Tonkean macaque)	Southern, southeastern, and eastern Asia, and northwestern Africa	Size range: 36 cm (14 in) long, plus 36 cm (14 in) tail (Toque macaque) to 77 cm (30 in) long, plus 20 cm (8 in) tail (Arunachal macaque) Habitats: Inland wetlands, rocky areas, shrubland, savanna, grassland, forest, intertidal marine, and caves Diets: Fish, crabs, shellfish, bird eggs, honeycombs, invertebrates, gums, pith, seeds, leaves, flowers, dirt, fungi, and birds
Mandrillus (mandrill)	Ritgen, 1824 Two species: M. leucophaeus (Drill); M. sphinx (Mandrill, pictured)	Western Africa	Size range: 55–95 cm (22–37 in) long, plus 7–10 cm (3–4 in) tail (Mandrill) Habitats: Rocky areas, forest, and savanna Diets: Omnivorous, primarily fruit and seeds
Miopithecus (talapoin)	Geoffroy, 1842 Two species: M. ogouensis (Gabon talapoin); M. talapoin (Angolan talapoin, pictured)	Western Africa	Size range: 23 cm (9 in) long, plus 31 cm (12 in) tail (Gabon talapoin) to 45 cm (18 in) long, plus 53 cm (21 in) tail (Angolan talapoin) Habitats: Inland wetlands and forest Diets: Insects, leaves, seeds, fruit, water plants, grubs, eggs, and small vertebrates
Papio (baboon)	Erxleben, 1777 Six species: P. anubis (Olive baboon, pictured); P. cynocephalus (Yellow baboon); P. hamadryas (Hamadryas baboon); P. kindae (Kinda baboon); P. papio (Guinea baboon); P. ursinus (Chacma baboon)	Sub-Saharan Africa and southwestern Arabian Peninsula	Size range: 50–115 cm (20–45 in) long, plus 45–72 cm (18–28 in) tail (Chacma baboon) Habitats: Inland wetlands, rocky areas, shrubland, savanna, desert, grassland, and forest Diets: Fruit, leaves, roots, insects, eggs, small vertebrates, flowers, buds, grass, and seeds
Rungwecebus	Davenport, 2006 One species: R. kipunji (Kipunji)	Southeastern Africa	Size: 85–90 cm (33–35 in) long, plus about 115 cm (45 in) tail Habitat: Forest Diet: Omnivorous, including bulbs, roots, shoots, seeds, and fruit
Theropithecus	Geoffroy, 1843 One species: T. gelada (Gelada)	Eastern Africa	Size: 50–75 cm (20–30 in) long, plus 32–55 cm (13–22 in) tail Habitats: Grassland and rocky areas Diet: Leaves and forbs, as well as roots, corms, tubers and rhizomes

Subfamily Colobinae – Jerdon, 1867 – ten genera
Name	Authority and species	Range	Size and ecology
Colobus (black-and-white colobus)	Illiger, 1811 Five species: C. angolensis (Angola colobus); C. guereza (Mantled guereza, pictured); C. polykomos (King colobus); C. satanas (Black colobus); C. vellerosus (Ursine colobus)	Central Africa and Western Africa	Size range: 45–72 cm (18–28 in) long, plus 52–100 cm (20–39 in) tail (King colobus) Habitats: Forest and savanna Diets: Leaves, nuts, and seeds, as well as fruit, flowers, buds, stems, bark, shoots, insects, and clay
Nasalis	É Geoffroy, 1812 One species: N. larvatus (Proboscis monkey)	Borneo	Size: 61–76 cm (24–30 in) long, plus 50–75 cm (20–30 in) tail Habitat: Forest Diet: Fruit, seeds, leaves, and shoots, as well as caterpillars and larvae
Piliocolobus (red colobus)	Rochebrune, 1887 Sixteen species: P. badius (Western red colobus); P. bouvieri (Bouvier's red colobus); P. epieni (Niger Delta red colobus); P. foai (Foa's red colobus); P. gordonorum (Udzungwa red colobus); P. kirkii (Zanzibar red colobus, pictured); P. langi (Lang's red colobus); P. oustaleti (Oustalet's red colobus); P. parmentieri (Lomami red colobus); P. pennantii (Pennant's colobus); P. preussi (Preuss's red colobus); P. rufomitratus (Tana River red colobus); P. semlikiensis (Semliki red colobus); P. tephrosceles (Ugandan red colobus); P. tholloni (Thollon's red colobus); P. waldronae (Miss Waldron's red colobus)	Congo, and eastern and western Africa	Size range: 41–70 cm (16–28 in) long, plus 42–80 cm (17–31 in) tail (multiple) Habitats: Inland wetlands, forest, shrubland, and savanna Diets: Leaves, fruit, shoots, buds, flowers, and seeds, as well as flowers
Presbytis (surili)	Eschscholtz, 1821 Nineteen species: P. bicolor (Black-and-white langur); P. canicrus (Miller's langur); P. chrysomelas (Sarawak surili); P. comata (Javan surili); P. femoralis (Raffles' banded langur, pictured); P. frontata (White-fronted surili); P. hosei (Hose's langur); P. melalophos (Black-crested Sumatran langur); P. mitrata (Mitered langur); P. natunae (Natuna Island surili); P. percura (East Sumatran banded langur); P. potenziani (Mentawai langur); P. robinsoni (Robinson's banded langur); P. rubicunda (Maroon leaf monkey); P. sabana (Sabah grizzled langur); P. siamensis (White-thighed surili); P. siberu (Siberut langur); P. sumatranus (Black Sumatran langur); P. thomasi (Thomas's langur)	Southeastern Asia	Size range: 42 cm (17 in) long, plus 50 cm (20 in) tail (Black Sumatran langur) to 62 cm (24 in) long, plus 85 cm (33 in) tail (Thomas's langur) Habitats: Inland wetlands, forest, and shrubland Diets: Fruit, leaves, seeds and flowers, as well as bark, twigs, stalks, birds, bird eggs, algae, and insects
Procolobus	Rochebrune, 1877 One species: P. verus (Olive colobus)	Western Africa	Size: 43–50 cm (17–20 in) long, plus 57–64 cm (22–25 in) tail Habitat: Forest Diet: Leaves and flowers
Pygathrix (douc)	É Geoffroy, 1812 Three species: P. cinerea (Gray-shanked douc); P. nemaeus (Red-shanked douc, pictured); P. nigripes (Black-shanked douc)	Southeastern Asia	Size range: 60 cm (24 in) long, plus 56 cm (22 in) tail (Black-shanked douc) to 77 cm (30 in) long, plus 77 cm (30 in) tail (Red-shanked douc) Habitat: Forest Diets: Leaves, as well as fruit, seeds, buds, and flowers
Rhinopithecus (snub-nosed monkey)	H. Milne-Edwards, 1872 Five species: R. avunculus (Tonkin snub-nosed monkey, pictured); R. bieti (Black-and-white snub-nosed monkey); R. brelichi (Gray snub-nosed monkey); R. roxellana (Golden snub-nosed monkey); R. strykeri (Myanmar snub-nosed monkey)	Southern China, Central China, Northern Vietnam, and Northern Myanmar	Size range: 51 cm (20 in) long, plus 66 cm (26 in) tail (Tonkin snub-nosed monkey) to 83 cm (33 in) long, plus 72 cm (28 in) tail (Black-and-white snub-nosed monkey) Habitat: Forest Diets: Leaves, fruit, buds, flowers, buds, bark, seeds, and lichen, as well as insect larvae
Semnopithecus (gray langur)	Desmarest, 1822 Eight species: S. ajax (Kashmir gray langur); S. entellus (Northern plains gray langur, pictured); S. hector (Tarai gray langur); S. hypoleucos (Black-footed gray langur); S. johnii (Nilgiri langur); S. priam (Tufted gray langur); S. schistaceus (Nepal gray langur); S. vetulus (Purple-faced langur)	Sri Lanka, India, and Himalayas	Size range: 41–78 cm (16–31 in) long, plus 69–108 cm (27–43 in) (multiple) Habitats: Rocky areas, forest, shrubland, and savanna Diets: Leaves, fruit, and flowers, seeds, roots, bark, twigs, coniferous cones, moss, lichens, ferns, shoots, rhizomes, grass, and invertebrates
Simias	Miller, 1903 One species: S. concolor (Pig-tailed langur)	Islands near Sumatra in Indonesia	Size: 45–53 cm (18–21 in) long, plus 13–18 cm (5–7 in) tail Habitat: Forest Diet: Leaves, fruit, and berries
Trachypithecus (lutung)	Reichenbach, 1862 21 species: T. auratus (East Javan langur); T. barbei (Tenasserim lutung); T. crepuscula (Indochinese grey langur); T. cristatus (Silvery lutung); T. delacouri (Delacour's langur); T. ebenus (Indochinese black langur); T. francoisi (François' langur); T. geei (Gee's golden langur); T. germaini (Germain's langur); T. hatinhensis (Hatinh langur); T. laotum (Laotian langur); T. leucocephalus (White-headed langur); T. margarita (Annamese langur); T. mauritius (West Javan langur); T. obscurus (Dusky leaf monkey, pictured); T. phayrei (Phayre's leaf monkey); T. pileatus (Capped langur); T. poliocephalus (Cat Ba langur); T. popa (Popa langur); T. selangorensis (Selangor silvered langur); T. shortridgei (Shortridge's langur)	Southeastern Asia	Size range: 40–76 cm (16–30 in) long, plus 57–110 cm (22–43 in) tail (multiple) Habitats: Inland wetlands, rocky areas, forests, forest, and caves Diets: Leaves, flowers, fruit, shoots, seeds, and twigs, as well as bark and insects

==== Superfamily Hominoidea ====
===== Family Hominidae =====
Members of the Hominidae family are hominids, or colloquially great apes, and include gorillas, chimpanzees, orangutans, and humans. Hominoidae comprises eight extant species, divided into four genera. These genera are grouped into two subfamilies: Homininae, or African hominids, containing gorillas, chimpanzees, bonobos, and humans; and Ponginae, or Asian hominids, containing orangutans.

Subfamily Homininae – Gray, 1825 – three genera
Name	Authority and species	Range	Size and ecology
Gorilla (gorilla)	Geoffroy, 1852 Two species: G. beringei (Eastern gorilla); G. gorilla (Western gorilla, pictured)	Central Africa and Western Africa	Size range: 130 cm (51 in) long (Western gorilla) to 196 cm (77 in) long (Eastern gorilla) Habitat: Forest Diets: Leaves, berries, ferns, bark, roots, stems, and pith, as well as wood, flowers, fruit, fungi, galls, invertebrates, and gorilla dung
Homo	Linnaeus, 1758 One species: H. sapiens (Human)	Worldwide (population density shown)	Size: 140–210 cm (55–83 in) long, including legs Habitats: Varied Diet: Omnivorous
Pan (chimpanzee)	Oken, 1816 Two species: P. paniscus (Bonobo, pictured); P. troglodytes (Chimpanzee)	Central and western Africa	Size range: 63–90 cm (25–35 in) long (Chimpanzee) Habitats: Forest and savanna Diets: Fruit, leaves, stems, buds, bark, pith, seeds, and resins, as well as leaves, insects, shoots, small vertebrates, truffles, fungus, honey, and eggs

Subfamily Ponginae – Elliot, 1913 – one genus
Name	Authority and species	Range	Size and ecology
Pongo	Lacépède, 1799 Three species: P. abelii (Sumatran orangutan); P. pygmaeus (Bornean orangutan, pictured); P. tapanuliensis (Tapanuli orangutan)	Borneo and Sumatra	Size range: 78–97 cm (31–38 in) long (Bornean orangutan) Habitat: Forest Diets: Fruit, leaves, shoots, flowers, and bark, as well as insects, sap, vines, spider webs, bird eggs, fungi, flowers, bark, and soil

===== Family Hylobatidae =====
Members of the Hylobatidae family are hylobatids, or colloquially gibbons. Hylobatidae comprises 19 extant species, divided into four genera.

Not assigned to a named subfamily – four genera
Name	Authority and species	Range	Size and ecology
Hoolock (hoolock gibbon)	Mootnick & Groves, 2005 Three species: H. hoolock (Western hoolock gibbon, pictured); H. leuconedys (Eastern hoolock gibbon); H. tianxing (Skywalker hoolock gibbon)	Southern Asia (in green)	Size range: 45 cm (18 in) long (Western hoolock gibbon) to 81 cm (32 in) long (Skywalker hoolock gibbon) Habitat: Forest Diets: Fruit and leaves, as well as shoots, invertebrates, bird chicks, and flowers
Hylobates (dwarf gibbon)	Illiger, 1811 Nine species: H. abbotti (Western grey gibbon); H. agilis (Agile gibbon); H. albibarbis (Bornean white-bearded gibbon); H. funereus (Eastern grey gibbon, pictured); H. klossii (Kloss's gibbon); H. lar (Lar gibbon); H. moloch (Silvery gibbon); H. muelleri (Müller's gibbon); H. pileatus (Pileated gibbon)	Southeastern Asia	Size range: 42 cm (17 in) long (Silvery gibbon) to 65 cm (26 in) long (Agile gibbon) Habitat: Forest Diets: Fruit, flowers, leaves, and insects, as well as eggs and small vertebrates
Nomascus (crested gibbon)	Miller, 1933 Seven species: N. annamensis (Northern buffed-cheeked gibbon); N. concolor (Black crested gibbon); N. gabriellae (Yellow-cheeked gibbon, pictured); N. hainanus (Hainan black crested gibbon); N. leucogenys (Northern white-cheeked gibbon); N. nasutus (Eastern black crested gibbon); N. siki (Southern white-cheeked gibbon)	Southeastern Asia	Size range: 40 cm (16 in) long (Eastern black crested gibbon) to 64 cm (25 in) long (Southern white-cheeked gibbon) Habitat: Forest Diets: Fruit, leaves, buds, shoots, and flowers, as well as insects, eggs, and small vertebrates
Symphalangus	Gloger, 1841 One species: S. syndactylus (Siamang)	Southeastern Asia	Size: 71–90 cm (28–35 in) long Habitat: Forest Diet: Fruit and leaves, as well as flowers and insects

==== Parvorder Platyrrhines ====
===== Family Aotidae =====
Members of the Aotidae family are aotids, or colloquially night monkeys. Aotidae comprises eleven extant species in a single genus.

Not assigned to a named subfamily – one genus
Name	Authority and species	Range	Size and ecology
Aotus (night monkey)	Illiger, 1811 Eleven species: A. azarae (Azara's night monkey); A. brumbacki (Brumback's night monkey); A. griseimembra (Gray-handed night monkey); A. jorgehernandezi (Hernández-Camacho's night monkey); A. lemurinus (Gray-bellied night monkey); A. miconax (Peruvian night monkey); A. nancymaae (Nancy Ma's night monkey); A. nigriceps (Black-headed night monkey); A. trivirgatus (Three-striped night monkey); A. vociferans (Spix's night monkey); A. zonalis (Panamanian night monkey, pictured)	Central and northern South America and Central America	Size range: 24 cm (9 in) long, plus 31 cm (12 in) tail (Azara's night monkey) to 47 cm (19 in) long plus 42 cm (17 in) tail (Three-striped night monkey) Habitats: Forest and savanna Diets: Fruit, nectar, leaves, flowers, buds, and insects, as well as small vertebrates and eggs

===== Family Atelidae =====
Members of the Atelidae family are atelids and include howler, spider, woolly, and woolly spider monkeys. Aotidae comprises 24 extant species in 4 genera. It is divided into the subfamilies Alouattinae, or howler monkeys, and Atelinae, or spider and woolly monkeys.

Subfamily Alouattinae – Trouessart, 1897 – one genus
Name	Authority and species	Range	Size and ecology
Alouatta (howler monkey)	Lacépède, 1799 Twelve species: A. arctoidea (Ursine howler); A. belzebul (Red-handed howler); A. caraya (Black howler, pictured); A. discolor (Spix's red-handed howler); A. guariba (Brown howler); A. macconnelli (Guyanan red howler); A. nigerrima (Amazon black howler); A. palliata (Mantled howler); A. pigra (Yucatán black howler); A. sara (Bolivian red howler); A. seniculus (Colombian red howler); A. ululata (Maranhão red-handed howler)	Mexico, Central America, and northern, eastern, and central South America	Size range: 38 cm (15 in) long, plus 52 cm (20 in) tail (Mantled howler) to 92 cm (36 in) long plus 92 cm (36 in) tail (Brown howler) Habitats: Forest and savanna Diets: Leaves, flowers, fruit, bark, and twigs as well as buds, seeds, moss, stems, termite nests, and decaying wood

Subfamily Atelinae – Gray, 1825 – three genera
Name	Authority and species	Range	Size and ecology
Ateles (spider monkey)	É Geoffroy, 1806 Seven species: A. belzebuth (White-bellied spider monkey); A. chamek (Peruvian spider monkey); A. fusciceps (Black-headed spider monkey); A. geoffroyi (Geoffroy's spider monkey); A. hybridus (Brown spider monkey, pictured); A. marginatus (White-cheeked spider monkey); A. paniscus (Red-faced spider monkey)	Mexico, Central America, and northern and central South America	Size range: 30–63 cm (12–25 in) long, plus 63–84 cm (25–33 in) tail (Geoffroy's spider monkey) Habitat: Forest Diets: Fruit, leaves, flowers, nuts, seeds, and insects, as well as bark, honey, decaying wood, roots, fungi, arachnids, and eggs
Brachyteles (muriqui)	É Geoffroy, 1806 Two species: B. arachnoides (Southern muriqui); B. hypoxanthus (Northern muriqui, pictured)	Southeastern Brazil	Size range: 46–50 cm (18–20 in) long, plus 72–81 cm (28–32 in) tail (both species) Habitat: Forest Diets: Leaves, fruit, vines, flowers, bark, nectar, and seeds
Lagothrix (woolly monkey)	É Geoffroy, 1812 Two species: L. flavicauda (Yellow-tailed woolly monkey); L. lagotricha (Common woolly monkey)	Western South America	Size range: 44 cm (17 in) long, plus 60 cm (24 in) tail (Yellow-tailed woolly monkey) to 69 cm (27 in) long plus 72 cm (28 in) tail (Common woolly monkey) Habitats: Forest and savanna Diets: Fruit, leaves, insects, seeds, moss, buds, and flowers

===== Family Callitrichidae =====
Members of the Callitrichidae family are callitrichids, and include marmosets, tamarins, and lion tamarins. Callitrichidae comprises 43 extant species in 7 genera.

Not assigned to a named subfamily – seven genera
Name	Authority and species	Range	Size and ecology
Callimico	Miranda-Ribeiro, 1922 One species: C. goeldii (Goeldi's marmoset)	Western South America	Size: 21–23 cm (8–9 in) long, plus 25–33 cm (10–13 in) tail Habitat: Forest Diet: Fruit, insects, and fungi, as well as lizards, frogs, and other small vertebrates
Callithrix (Atlantic Forest marmoset)	Erxleben, 1777 Six species: C. aurita (Buffy-tufted marmoset); C. flaviceps (Buffy-headed marmoset); C. geoffroyi (White-headed marmoset, pictured); C. jacchus (Common marmoset); C. kuhlii (Wied's marmoset); C. penicillata (Black-tufted marmoset)	Eastern South America	Size range: 12 cm (5 in) long, plus 29 cm (11 in) tail (Common marmoset) to 30 cm (12 in) long plus 41 cm (16 in) tail (Buffy-headed marmoset) Habitats: Forest and savanna Diets: Plant gum, sap, fruit, flowers, nectar, seeds, insects, and spiders, as well as molluscs, small vertebrates, and bird eggs
Cebuella (pygmy marmoset)	Gray, 1866 Two species: C. niveiventris (Eastern pygmy marmoset); C. pygmaea (Western pygmy marmoset, pictured)	Western South America	Size range: 12 cm (5 in) long, plus 17 cm (7 in) tail (Western pygmy marmoset) to 30 cm (12 in) long plus 41 cm (16 in) tail (Eastern pygmy marmoset) Habitat: Forest Diets: Tree gum, sap, and resin, as well as insects, small lizards, fruit, flowers, and spiders
Leontocebus (saddle-back tamarin)	Wagner, 1840 Seven species: L. cruzlimai (Cruz Lima's saddle-back tamarin); L. fuscus (Lesson's saddle-back tamarin); L. illigeri (Illiger's saddle-back tamarin); L. lagonotus (Red-mantled saddle-back tamarin); L. leucogenys (Andean saddle-back tamarin); L. nigrifrons (Geoffroy's saddle-back tamarin); L. weddelli (Weddell's saddle-back tamarin, pictured)	Central and western South America	Size range: 17–31 cm (7–12 in) long, plus 25–44 cm (10–17 in) tail (multiple) Habitat: Forest Diets: Fruit, sap, nectar, vegetation, invertebrates, small vertebrates, and eggs
Leontopithecus (lion tamarin)	Lesson, 1840 Four species: L. caissara (Superagüi lion tamarin); L. chrysomelas (Golden-headed lion tamarin, pictured); L. chrysopygus (Black lion tamarin); L. rosalia (Golden lion tamarin)	Southeastern South America	Size range: 20 cm (8 in) long, plus 31 cm (12 in) tail (Black lion tamarin) to 37 cm (15 in) long plus 40 cm (16 in) tail (Golden lion tamarin) Habitat: Forest Diets: Spiders, snails, insects, small lizards, eggs, small birds, fruit, flowers, gum, nectar, and vegetables, as well as snakes and other small vertebrates
Mico (marmoset)	Lesson, 1840 Sixteen species: M. acariensis (Rio Acarí marmoset); M. argentatus (Silvery marmoset, pictured); M. chrysoleucos (Gold-and-white marmoset); M. emiliae (Emilia's marmoset); M. humeralifer (Santarem marmoset); M. humilis (Roosmalens' dwarf marmoset); M. intermedius (Hershkovitz's marmoset); M. leucippe (White marmoset); M. marcai (Marca's marmoset); M. mauesi (Maués marmoset); M. melanurus (Black-tailed marmoset); M. munduruku (Munduruku marmoset); M. nigriceps (Black-headed marmoset); M. rondoni (Rondon's marmoset); M. saterei (Satéré marmoset); M. schneideri (Schneider's marmoset)	Central South America	Size range: 18–30 cm (7–12 in) long, plus 17–41 cm (7–16 in) tail (multiple) Habitats: Forest, shrubland, and savanna Diets: Sap, gum, fruit, seeds, nuts, insects, snails, spiders, leaves and small vertebrates
Saguinus (tamarin)	Hoffmannsegg, 1807 Seventeen species: S. bicolor (Pied tamarin); S. fuscicollis (Brown-mantled tamarin); S. geoffroyi (Geoffroy's tamarin); S. imperator (Emperor tamarin, pictured); S. inustus (Mottle-faced tamarin); S. labiatus (White-lipped tamarin); S. leucopus (White-footed tamarin); S. martinsi (Martins's tamarin); S. melanoleucus (White-mantled tamarin); S. midas (Golden-handed tamarin); S. mystax (Moustached tamarin); S. niger (Black tamarin); S. nigricollis (Black-mantled tamarin); S. oedipus (Cotton-top tamarin); S. pileatus (Red-capped tamarin); S. tripartitus (Golden-mantled tamarin); S. ursula (Eastern black-handed tamarin)	Western, central, and eastern South America and southeastern Central America	Size range: 17–31 cm (7–12 in) long, plus 25–44 cm (10–17 in) tail (multiple) Habitats: Forest and savanna Diets: Fruit, sap, nectar, gum, seeds, flowers, invertebrates, small vertebrates, eggs, and soil

===== Family Cebidae =====
Members of the Cebidae family are cebids, and include capuchin and squirrel monkeys. Cebidae comprises eighteen extant species in three genera, and is divided into the subfamilies Cebinae, or capuchin monkeys, and Saimiriinae, or squirrel monkeys.

Subfamily Cebinae – Bonaparte, 1831 – two genera
Name	Authority and species	Range	Size and ecology
Cebus (gracile capuchin monkey)	Erxleben, 1777 Four species: C. albifrons (Humboldt's white-fronted capuchin); C. capucinus (Colombian white-faced capuchin, pictured); C. kaapori (Kaapori capuchin); C. olivaceus (Wedge-capped capuchin)	Northern and central South America and southeastern Central America	Size range: 30–57 cm (12–22 in) long, plus 30–56 cm (12–22 in) tail (Kaapori capuchin) Habitats: Forest and savanna Diets: Fruit, seeds, berries, nuts, figs, nectar, invertebrates, and small vertebrates
Sapajus (robust capuchin monkey)	Kerr, 1792 Seven species: S. apella (Tufted capuchin, pictured); S. cay (Azaras's capuchin); S. flavius (Blond capuchin); S. libidinosus (Black-striped capuchin); S. nigritus (Black capuchin); S. robustus (Crested capuchin); S. xanthosternos (Golden-bellied capuchin)	Northern, central, and eastern South America	Size range: 30–57 cm (12–22 in) long, plus 30–56 cm (12–22 in) tail (multiple) Habitats: Forest, shrubland, and savanna Diets: Fruit, seeds, nectar, pith, stems, nuts, berries, flowers, leaves, bird eggs, insects, frogs, small reptiles, birds, bats, other small mammals, oysters, and crabs

Subfamily Saimiriinae – Miller, 1912 – one genus
Name	Authority and species	Range	Size and ecology
Saimiri (squirrel monkey)	Voigt, 1831 Seven species: S. boliviensis (Black-capped squirrel monkey); S. cassiquiarensis (Humboldt's squirrel monkey); S. collinsi (Collins' squirrel monkey, pictured); S. oerstedii (Central American squirrel monkey); S. sciureus (Guianan squirrel monkey); S. ustus (Bare-eared squirrel monkey); S. vanzolinii (Black squirrel monkey)	Northern and central South America and southern Central America	Size range: 22 cm (9 in) long, plus 37 cm (15 in) tail (Central American squirrel monkey) to 36 cm (14 in) long plus 43 cm (17 in) tail (Bare-eared squirrel monkey) Habitat: Forest Diets: Fruit, berries, seeds, nuts, gum, nectar, leaves, buds, flowers, insects, arachnids, bird eggs, and small vertebrates

===== Family Pitheciidae =====
Members of the Pitheciidae family are pitheciids, and include titis, saki monkeys and uakaris. Pitheciidae comprises 58 extant species in 6 genera, and is divided into the subfamilies Callicebinae, or titis, and Pitheciinae, or saki monkeys and uakaris.

Subfamily Callicebinae – Pocock, 1925 – three genera
Name	Authority and species	Range	Size and ecology
Callicebus (Atlantic Forest titi monkey)	Thomas, 1903 Five species: C. barbarabrownae (Barbara Brown's titi monkey); C. coimbrai (Coimbra Filho's titi monkey); C. melanochir (Coastal black-handed titi monkey); C. nigrifrons (Black-fronted titi monkey); C. personatus (Atlantic titi monkey, pictured)	Eastern South America	Size range: 23–46 cm (9–18 in) long, plus 26–56 cm (10–22 in) tail (multiple) Habitats: Forest, shrubland, and savanna Diets: Fruit, leaves, flowers, seeds, and insects, as well as birds, vegetation, eggs, and small vertebrates and invertebrates
Cheracebus (widow titi monkey)	Byrne et al., 2016 Five species: C. lucifer (Lucifer titi monkey); C. lugens (Black titi monkey); C. medemi (Colombian black-handed titi monkey); C. regulus (Red-headed titi monkey); C. torquatus (Collared titi monkey)	Northern South America, Central South America, and Northwestern South America	Size range: 23–46 cm (9–18 in) long, plus 26–56 cm (10–22 in) tail (multiple) Habitats: Forest and savanna Diets: Fruit, seeds, leaves, stems, flowers, insects, spiders, and bird eggs
Plecturocebus	Byrne et al., 2016 23 species: P. aureipalatii (Madidi titi monkey); P. baptista (Baptista Lake titi monkey); P. bernhardi (Prince Bernhard's titi monkey); P. brunneus (Brown titi monkey); P. caligatus (Chestnut-bellied titi monkey); P. caquetensis (Caquetá titi monkey); P. cinerascens (Ashy black titi monkey); P. cupreus (Coppery titi monkey); P. discolor (White-tailed titi monkey); P. donacophilus (White-eared titi monkey); P. dubius (Hershkovitz's titi monkey); P. hoffmannsi (Hoffmanns's titi monkey); P. miltoni (Milton's titi monkey); P. modestus (Rio Beni titi monkey); P. moloch (Red-bellied titi monkey); P. oenanthe (Rio Mayo titi monkey); P. olallae (Olalla brothers' titi monkey); P. ornatus (Ornate titi monkey); P. pallescens (White-coated titi monkey); P. stephennashi (Stephen Nash's titi monkey); P. toppini (Toppin's titi monkey); P. urubambensis (Urubamba brown titi monkey); P. vieirai (Vieira's titi monkey)	Northern, western, and central South America	Size range: 23–46 cm (9–18 in) long, plus 26–56 cm (10–22 in) tail (multiple) Habitats: Forest and savanna Diets: Fruit, flowers, seeds, leaves, vines, and insects, as well as arthropods, stems, shoots, eggs, and small vertebrates

Subfamily Pitheciinae – Mivart, 1865 – three genera
Name	Authority and species	Range	Size and ecology
Cacajao (uakari)	Lesson, 1840 Seven species: C. ayresi (Aracá uakari); C. calvus (White bald-headed uakari, pictured); C. hosomi (Neblina uakari); C. melanocephalus (Golden-backed uakari); C. novaesi (Novae's bald-headed uakari); C. rubicundus (Red bald-headed uakari); C. ucayalii (Ucayali bald-headed uakari)	Northern and western South America	Size range: 30–57 cm (12–22 in) long, plus 12–21 cm (5–8 in) tail (Aracá uakari) Habitats: Forest and savanna Diets: Fruit, nuts, seeds, flowers, leaves, nectar, insects, and arthropods
Chiropotes (bearded saki)	Lesson, 1840 Five species: C. albinasus (White-nosed saki); C. chiropotes (Red-backed bearded saki); C. sagulatus (Reddish-brown bearded saki); C. satanas (Black bearded saki, pictured); C. utahickae (Uta Hick's bearded saki)	Northern, northeastern, and central South America	Size range: 32 cm (13 in) long, plus 37 cm (15 in) tail (Black bearded saki) to 52 cm (20 in) long plus 51 cm (20 in) tail (Reddish-brown bearded saki) Habitat: Forest Diets: Fruit, seeds, nuts, flowers, and insects, as well as stems, arthropods, and leaves
Pithecia (saki monkey)	Desmarest, 1804 Thirteen species: P. aequatorialis (Equatorial saki); P. albicans (White-footed saki); P. cazuzai (Cazuza's saki); P. chrysocephala (Golden-faced saki); P. hirsuta (Hairy saki); P. inusta (Burnished saki); P. irrorata (Rio Tapajós saki, pictured); P. isabela (Isabel's saki); P. milleri (Miller's saki); P. monachus (Monk saki); P. napensis (Napo saki); P. pithecia (White-faced saki); P. vanzolinii (Vanzolini's bald-faced saki)	Northern and central South America	Size range: 20 cm (8 in) long, plus 20 cm (8 in) tail (Napo saki) to 71 cm (28 in) long plus 55 cm (22 in) tail (Burnished saki) Habitat: Forest Diets: Seeds, fruit pulp, leaves, insects, and flowers

==== Infraorder Tarsiiformes ====
===== Family Tarsiidae =====
Members of the Tarsiidae family are tarsiids, or colloquially tarsiers. Tarsiidae comprises fourteen extant species in three genera.

Not assigned to a named subfamily – three genera
Name	Authority and species	Range	Size and ecology
Carlito	Groves & Shekelle, 2010 One species: C. syrichta (Philippine tarsier)	Southeastern Philippines	Size: 8–16 cm (3–6 in) long, plus about 25 cm (10 in) tail Habitat: Forest Diet: Insects, spiders, lizards, and other small vertebrates
Cephalopachus	Swainson, 1835 One species: T. bancanus (Horsfield's tarsier)	Western Philippines	Size: 11–15 cm (4–6 in) long, plus 20–24 cm (8–9 in) tail Habitat: Forest Diet: Insects, as well as small vertebrates including birds, mammals, and reptiles
Tarsius (tarsier)	Storr, 1780 Twelve species: T. dentatus (Dian's tarsier); T. fuscus (Makassar tarsier); T. lariang (Lariang tarsier); T. niemitzi (Niemitz's tarsier); T. pelengensis (Peleng tarsier); T. pumilus (Pygmy tarsier); T. sangirensis (Sangihe tarsier); T. spectrumgurskyae (Gursky's spectral tarsier, pictured); T. supriatnai (Jatna's tarsier); T. tarsier (Spectral tarsier); T. tumpara (Siau Island tarsier); T. wallacei (Wallace's tarsier)	Sulawesi, Indonesia	Size range: 8 cm (3 in) long, plus 20 cm (8 in) tail (Pygmy tarsier) to 15 cm (6 in) long plus 20 cm (8 in) tail (Siau Island tarsier) Habitats: Inland wetlands, forest, and caves Diets: Arthropods and insects, as well as small vertebrates

=== Suborder Strepsirrhini ===
==== Superfamily Lemuroidea ====
===== Family Cheirogaleidae =====
Members of the Cheirogaleidae family are cheirogaleids, and include dwarf, mouse, giant mouse, and fork-marked lemurs. Cheirogaleidae comprises 41 extant species in 5 genera.

Not assigned to a named subfamily – five genera
Name	Authority and species	Range	Size and ecology
Allocebus	Petter-Rousseaux & Petter, 1967 One species: A. trichotis (Hairy-eared dwarf lemur)	Northeastern Madagascar	Size: 12–15 cm (5–6 in) long, plus about 17 cm (7 in) tail Habitat: Forest Diet: Nectar, fruit, gum, leaves, honey, and insects
Cheirogaleus (dwarf lemur)	É Geoffroy, 1812 Ten species: C. andysabini (Montagne d'Ambre dwarf lemur); C. crossleyi (Furry-eared dwarf lemur); C. grovesi (Groves' dwarf lemur, pictured); C. lavasoensis (Lavasoa dwarf lemur); C. major (Greater dwarf lemur); C. medius (Fat-tailed dwarf lemur); C. minusculus (Lesser iron-gray dwarf lemur); C. shethi (Ankarana dwarf lemur); C. sibreei (Sibree's dwarf lemur); C. thomasi (Thomas' dwarf lemur)	Madagascar	Size range: 16 cm (6 in) long, plus 18 cm (7 in) tail (Ankarana dwarf lemur) to 27 cm (11 in) long plus 31 cm (12 in) tail (Greater dwarf lemur) Habitats: Forest and shrubland Diets: Fruit, flowers, leaves, seeds, nectar, and insects, as well as small vertebrates and honey
Microcebus (mouse lemur)	É Geoffroy, 1834 24 species: M. arnholdi (Arnhold's mouse lemur); M. berthae (Madame Berthe's mouse lemur); M. bongolavensis (Bongolava mouse lemur); M. boraha (Nosy Boraha mouse lemur); M. danfossi (Danfoss's mouse lemur); M. ganzhorni (Ganzhorn's mouse lemur); M. gerpi (Gerp's mouse lemur); M. griseorufus (Reddish-gray mouse lemur); M. jollyae (Jolly's mouse lemur); M. jonahi (Jonah's mouse lemur); M. lehilahytsara (Goodman's mouse lemur); M. macarthurii (MacArthur's mouse lemur); M. mamiratra (Claire's mouse lemur); M. manitatra (Bemanasy mouse lemur); M. margotmarshae (Margot Marsh's mouse lemur); M. marohita (Marohita mouse lemur); M. murinus (Gray mouse lemur); M. myoxinus (Pygmy mouse lemur, pictured); M. ravelobensis (Golden-brown mouse lemur); M. rufus (Brown mouse lemur); M. sambiranensis (Sambirano mouse lemur); M. simmonsi (Simmons' mouse lemur); M. tanosi (Anosy mouse lemur); M. tavaratra (Northern rufous mouse lemur)	Madagascar	Size range: 8 cm (3 in) long, plus 11 cm (4 in) tail (Margot Marsh's mouse lemur) to 16 cm (6 in) long plus 15 cm (6 in) tail (Anosy mouse lemur) Habitats: Forest and shrubland Diets: Gum, insect excretions, nectar, fruit, leaves, flowers, pollen, arthropods, and small vertebrates
Mirza (giant mouse lemur)	Gray, 1870 Two species: M. coquereli (Coquerel's giant mouse lemur); M. zaza (Northern giant mouse lemur, pictured)	Western and northern Madagascar	Size range: 23 cm (9 in) long, plus 31 cm (12 in) tail (Coquerel's giant mouse lemur) to 27 cm (11 in) long plus 32 cm (13 in) tail (Coquerel's giant mouse lemur) Habitat: Forest Diets: Fruit, flowers, insect secretions, sap, and invertebrates, as well as small vertebrates
Phaner (fork-marked lemur)	Gray, 1870 Four species: P. electromontis (Amber Mountain fork-marked lemur); P. furcifer (Masoala fork-marked lemur); P. pallescens (Pale fork-marked lemur, pictured); P. parienti (Pariente's fork-marked lemur)	Western, northeastern, and northern Madagascar	Size range: 22–29 cm (9–11 in) long, plus 28–37 cm (11–15 in) tail (multiple) Habitat: Forest Diets: Sap and gum, as well as insects, insect secretions, fruit, flowers, and nectar

===== Family Daubentoniidae =====
Members of the Daubentoniidae family are daubentoniids; the family comprises a single extant species, the aye-aye.

Not assigned to a named subfamily – one genus
Name	Authority and species	Range	Size and ecology
Daubentonia	É Geoffroy, 1795 One species: D. madagascariensis (Aye-aye)	Western and eastern Madagascar	Size: 36–44 cm (14–17 in) long, plus tail Habitats: Forest and shrubland Diet: Fruit, nuts, and sap

===== Family Indriidae =====
Members of the Indriidae family are indriids, and include woolly lemurs, sifakas, and indri. Indriidae comprises nineteen extant species in three genera.

Not assigned to a named subfamily – three genera
Name	Authority and species	Range	Size and ecology
Avahi (woolly lemur)	Jourdan, 1834 Nine species: A. betsileo (Betsileo woolly lemur); A. cleesei (Bemaraha woolly lemur); A. laniger (Eastern woolly lemur); A. meridionalis (Southern woolly lemur); A. mooreorum (Moore's woolly lemur); A. occidentalis (Western woolly lemur, pictured); A. peyrierasi (Peyrieras's woolly lemur); A. ramanantsoavani (Ramanantsoavana's woolly lemur); A. unicolor (Sambirano woolly lemur)	Madagascar	Size range: 25 cm (10 in) long, plus 28 cm (11 in) tail (Betsileo woolly lemur) to 37 cm (15 in) long plus 35 cm (14 in) tail (Bemaraha woolly lemur) Habitat: Forest Diets: Buds and leaves, as well as flowers and fruit
Indri	É. Geoffroy & G. Cuvier, 1796 One species: I. indri (Indri)	Northeastern Madagascar	Size: 60–90 cm (24–35 in) long, plus 5–6 cm (2–2 in) tail Habitat: Forest Diet: Fruit, leaves, and flowers
Propithecus (sifaka)	Bennett, 1832 Nine species: P. candidus (Silky sifaka); P. coquereli (Coquerel's sifaka); P. coronatus (Crowned sifaka); P. deckenii (Von der Decken's sifaka, pictured); P. diadema (Diademed sifaka); P. edwardsi (Milne-Edwards's sifaka); P. perrieri (Perrier's sifaka); P. tattersalli (Golden-crowned sifaka); P. verreauxi (Verreaux's sifaka)	Madagascar	Size range: 42 cm (17 in) long, plus 50 cm (20 in) tail (Coquerel's sifaka) to 55 cm (22 in) long, plus 56 cm (22 in) tail (Diademed sifaka) Habitats: Forest, shrubland, and savanna Diets: Leaves, flowers, fruit, seeds, shoots, and bark, as well as soil

===== Family Lemuridae =====
Members of the Lemuridae family are lemurids, and include ring-tailed, true, ruffed, and bamboo lemurs. Indriidae comprises 21 extant species in 5 genera.

Not assigned to a named subfamily – five genera
Name	Authority and species	Range	Size and ecology
Eulemur (true lemur)	Simons & Rumpler, 1988 Twelve species: E. albifrons (White-headed lemur); E. cinereiceps (Gray-headed lemur); E. collaris (Collared brown lemur); E. coronatus (Crowned lemur); E. flavifrons (Blue-eyed black lemur, pictured); E. fulvus (Common brown lemur); E. macaco (Black lemur); E. mongoz (Mongoose lemur); E. rubriventer (Red-bellied lemur); E. rufifrons (Red-fronted lemur); E. rufus (Red lemur); E. sanfordi (Sanford's brown lemur)	Madagascar	Size range: 30 cm (12 in) long, plus 40 cm (16 in) tail (Black lemur) to 51 cm (20 in) long plus 51 cm (20 in) tail (Common brown lemur) Habitat: Forest Diets: Leaves, fruit, buds, flowers, and pollen, as well as nectar, bark, insects, arthropods, fungi, and soil
Hapalemur (bamboo lemur)	Geoffroy, 1851 Five species: H. alaotrensis (Lac Alaotra bamboo lemur); H. aureus (Golden bamboo lemur, pictured); H. griseus (Eastern lesser bamboo lemur); H. meridionalis (Southern lesser bamboo lemur); H. occidentalis (Western lesser bamboo lemur)	Western, northern, and eastern Madagascar	Size range: 24 cm (9 in) long, plus 32 cm (13 in) tail (Southern lesser bamboo lemur) to 34 cm (13 in) long plus 41 cm (16 in) tail (Golden bamboo lemur) Habitats: Inland wetlands and forest Diets: Marsh plants, bamboo, grass, pith, stems, flowers, and leaves, as well as fruit, fungi, and soil
Lemur	Linnaeus, 1758 One species: L. catta (Ring-tailed lemur)	Southwestern Madagascar	Size: 39–46 cm (15–18 in) long, plus 56–63 cm (22–25 in) tail Habitats: Forest, shrubland, rocky areas, and caves Diet: Omnivorous, including fruit, leaves, stems, flowers, sap, spiders, spider webs, chameleons, insects, small birds, and termite mounds
Prolemur	Gray, 1871 One species: P. simus (Greater bamboo lemur)	Eastern Madagascar	Size: 40–45 cm (16–18 in) long, plus 43–48 cm (17–19 in) tail Habitat: Forest Diet: Bamboo shoots and pith, as well as flowers, leaves, soil, and fruit
Varecia (ruffed lemur)	Gray, 1863 Two species: V. rubra (Red ruffed lemur, pictured); V. variegata (Black-and-white ruffed lemur)	Eastern Madagascar	Size range: 45 cm (18 in) long, plus 60 cm (24 in) tail (Black-and-white ruffed lemur) to 50 cm (20 in) long plus 60 cm (24 in) tail (Red ruffed lemur) Habitat: Forest Diets: Fruit, nectar, and pollen, as well as leaves, flower, and seeds

===== Family Lepilemuridae =====
Members of the Lepilemuridae family are lepilemurids, or colloquially sportive lemurs. Lepilemuridae comprises 25 extant species in a single genus.

Not assigned to a named subfamily – one genus
Name	Authority and species	Range	Size and ecology
Lepilemur (sportive lemur)	Geoffroy, 1851 25 species: L. aeeclis (AEECL's sportive lemur); L. ahmansoni (Ahmanson's sportive lemur); L. ankaranensis (Ankarana sportive lemur); L. betsileo (Betsileo sportive lemur); L. dorsalis (Gray-backed sportive lemur); L. edwardsi (Milne-Edwards' sportive lemur); L. fleuretae (Fleurete's sportive lemur); L. grewcocki (Grewcock's sportive lemur); L. hollandorum (Holland's sportive lemur); L. hubbardi (Hubbard's sportive lemur, pictured); L. jamesi (James' sportive lemur); L. leucopus (White-footed sportive lemur); L. microdon (Small-toothed sportive lemur); L. milanoii (Daraina sportive lemur); L. mustelinus (Weasel sportive lemur); L. otto (Otto's sportive lemur); L. petteri (Petter's sportive lemur); L. randrianasoloi (Randrianasolo's sportive lemur); L. ruficaudatus (Red-tailed sportive lemur); L. sahamalaza (Sahamalaza sportive lemur); L. scottorum (Scott's sportive lemur); L. seali (Seal's sportive lemur); L. septentrionalis (Northern sportive lemur); L. tymerlachsoni (Hawks' sportive lemur); L. wrighti (Wright's sportive lemur)	Madagascar	Size range: 23 cm (9 in) long, plus 26 cm (10 in) tail (Gray-backed sportive lemur) to 41 cm (16 in) long plus 27 cm (11 in) tail (Hawks' sportive lemur) Habitat: Forest Diets: Leaves, vines, fruit, flowers, spiders, and insects, as well as seeds, pollen, latex, and bark

==== Superfamily Lorisoidea ====
===== Family Galagidae =====
Members of the Galagidae family are galagids, or colloquially galagos or bush babies. Galagidae comprises nineteen extant species in six genera.

Not assigned to a named subfamily – six genera
Name	Authority and species	Range	Size and ecology
Euoticus (needle-clawed bushbaby)	Gray, 1863 Two species: E. elegantulus (Southern needle-clawed bushbaby); E. pallidus (Northern needle-clawed bushbaby, pictured)	Western equatorial Africa	Size range: 18–33 cm (7–13 in) long, plus 28–31 cm (11–12 in) tail (Northern needle-clawed bushbaby) Habitat: Forest Diets: Tree gums and resins, as well as invertebrates
Galago (lesser bushbaby)	É Geoffroy, 1796 Four species: G. gallarum (Somali bushbaby); G. matschiei (Dusky bushbaby); G. moholi (Mohol bushbaby); G. senegalensis (Senegal bushbaby, pictured)	Equatorial and southern Africa	Size range: 13–21 cm (5–8 in) long, plus 19–30 cm (7–12 in) tail (Senegal bushbaby) Habitats: Forest and savanna Diets: Invertebrates, fruit, flowers, and gum, as well as small birds, eggs, and seeds
Galagoides (western dwarf galago)	A. Smith, 1833 Three species: G. demidoff (Prince Demidoff's bushbaby, pictured); G. kumbirensis (Angolan dwarf galago); G. thomasi (Thomas's bushbaby)	Western and central equatorial Africa	Size range: 10 cm (4 in) long, plus 15 cm (6 in) tail (Prince Demidoff's bushbaby) to 18 cm (7 in) long plus 21 cm (8 in) tail (Angolan dwarf galago) Habitats: Forest and shrubland Diets: Insects, as well as fruit, gum, small vertebrates, tree buds, and leaves
Otolemur (greater galago)	Coquerel, 1859 Two species: O. crassicaudatus (Brown greater galago, pictured); O. garnettii (Northern greater galago)	Southern and eastern Africa	Size range: 23 cm (9 in) long, plus 36 cm (14 in) tail (Northern greater galago) to 38 cm (15 in) long plus 48 cm (19 in) tail (Brown greater galago) Habitats: Forest, shrubland, and savanna Diets: Gum, sap, fruit, and insects
Paragalago (eastern dwarf galago)	Masters, Génin, Couette, Groves, Nash, Delpero, & Pozzi, 2017 Five species: P. cocos (Kenya coast galago, pictured); P. granti (Grant's bushbaby); P. orinus (Uluguru bushbaby); P. rondoensis (Rondo dwarf galago); P. zanzibaricus (Zanzibar bushbaby)	Southeastern Africa	Size range: 10 cm (4 in) long, plus 17 cm (7 in) tail (Rondo dwarf galago) to 19 cm (7 in) long plus 27 cm (11 in) tail (Grant's bushbaby) Habitat: Forest Diets: Fruit, gum, nectar, invertebrates, small vertebrates, and flowers
Sciurocheirus (squirrel galago)	Waterhouse, 1838 Three species: S. alleni (Bioko Allen's bushbaby, pictured); S. gabonensis (Gabon bushbaby); S. makandensis (Makandé squirrel galago)	Western equatorial Africa	Size range: 15–24 cm (6–9 in) long, plus 20–30 cm (8–12 in) tail (Bioko Allen's bushbaby) Habitat: Forest Diets: Arthropods, insects, fruit, and gum, as well as small mammals

===== Family Lorisidae =====
Members of the Lorisidae family are lorisids, and include lorises, pottos and angwantibos. Lorisidae comprises sixteen extant species in five genera, and is divided into the subfamilies Lorisinae, or lorises, and Perodicticinae, or the angwantibos and pottos.

Subfamily Lorisinae – Gray, 1821 – three genera
Name	Authority and species	Range	Size and ecology
Loris (slender loris)	É Geoffroy, 1796 Two species: L. lydekkerianus (Gray slender loris); L. tardigradus (Red slender loris, pictured)	Sri Lanka and Southern India	Size range: 18 cm (7 in) long with no tail (Gray slender loris) to 26 cm (10 in) long with no tail (Red slender loris) Habitat: Forest Diets: Insects, as well as tree frogs, geckos, small birds, eggs, and fruit
Nycticebus (slow loris)	É Geoffroy, 1812 Eight species: N. bancanus (Bangka slow loris); N. bengalensis (Bengal slow loris); N. borneanus (Bornean slow loris); N. coucang (Sunda slow loris); N. hilleri (Sumatran slow loris); N. javanicus (Javan slow loris, pictured); N. kayan (Kayan River slow loris); N. menagensis (Philippine slow loris)	Southeastern Asia (blue and brown)	Size range: 26 cm (10 in) long with no tail (Bangka slow loris) to 38 cm (15 in) long, with vestigial tail (Bengal slow loris) Habitat: Forest Diets: Resin, sap, gum, nectar, stems, fruit, invertebrates, lizards, bark, and bird eggs
Xanthonycticebus	Nekaris & Nijman, 2022 One species: X. pygmaeus (Pygmy slow loris)	Southeastern Asia	Size: 15–25 cm (6–10 in) long, with no tail Habitat: Forest Diet: Insects, gum, resin, fruit, and bamboo

Subfamily Perodicticinae – Gray, 1870 – two genera
Name	Authority and species	Range	Size and ecology
Arctocebus (angwantibo)	Gray, 1863 Two species: A. aureus (Golden angwantibo); A. calabarensis (Calabar angwantibo, pictured)	Western equatorial Africa	Size range: 22 cm (9 in) long, plus vestigial tail (Golden angwantibo) to 31 cm (12 in) long plus 10 cm (4 in) tail (Calabar angwantibo) Habitat: Forest Diets: Insects and fruit, as well as gum
Perodicticus (potto)	Bennett, 1831 Three species: P. edwarsi (Central African potto); P. ibeanus (East African potto); P. potto (West African potto, pictured)	Western and central Africa	Size range: 29 cm (11 in) long, plus 4 cm (2 in) tail (East African potto) to 39 cm (15 in) long plus 10 cm (4 in) tail (West African potto) Habitat: Forest Diets: Fruit, gum, nectar, invertebrates, and eggs, as well as moss and small vertebrates

== Sources ==
- Ankel-Simons, Friderun (2000). Primate Anatomy: An Introduction. Academic Press. ISBN 978-0-12-058670-7.
- Burnie, David; Wilson, Don E., eds. (2017). Animal: The Definitive Visual Guide. DK. ISBN 978-1-4654-7086-7.
- Cartmill, Matt; Smith, Fred H. (2011). The Human Lineage. John Wiley & Sons. ISBN 978-1-118-21145-8.
- Francis, Charles (2019). Field Guide to the Mammals of South-east Asia (2nd ed.). Bloomsbury Publishing. ISBN 978-1-4729-3499-4.
- Garbutt, Nick (2007). Mammals of Madagascar: A Complete Guide. A & C Black. ISBN 978-0-300-12550-4.
- Groves, Colin P. (2005). Wilson, Don E.; Reeder, DeeAnn M. (eds.). Mammal Species of the World. Vol. 1 (3rd ed.). Johns Hopkins University Press. ISBN 978-0-8018-8221-0.
- Kingdon, Jonathan (2014). Mammals of Africa. Vol. II: Primates. A & C Black. ISBN 978-1-4081-8991-7.
- Kingdon, Jonathan (2015). The Kingdon Field Guide to African Mammals (2nd ed.). Bloomsbury Publishing. ISBN 978-1-4729-2531-2.
- Kingdon, Jonathan (2020). The Kingdon Pocket Guide to African Mammals (2nd ed.). Bloomsbury Publishing. ISBN 978-1-4729-8320-6.
- Kingdon, Jonathan; Happold, David; Butynski, Thomas; Hoffmann, Michael; Happold, Meredith; Kalina, Jan, eds. (2013). Mammals of Africa. Vol. 2. Bloomsbury Publishing. ISBN 978-1-4081-8996-2.
- Menon, Vivek (2023). Indian Mammals: A Field Guide (4th ed.). Hachette India. ISBN 978-93-93701-90-9.
- Nekaris, K. A. I.; Bearder, S. K. (2007). Campbell, C.; Fuentes, C.A.; MacKinnon, K.; Panger, M.; Stumpf, R. (eds.). Primates in Perspective. Oxford University Press. ISBN 978-0-19-517133-4.
- Nowak, Ronald M. (1999a). Walker's Mammals of the World. Vol. 1. Johns Hopkins University Press. ISBN 978-0-8018-5789-8.
- Nowak, Ronald M. (1999b). Walker's Primates of the World. Johns Hopkins University Press. ISBN 978-0-8018-6251-9.
- Petter, Jean-Jacques; Desbordes, François (2013). Primates of the World: An Illustrated Guide. Princeton University Press. ISBN 978-0-691-15695-8.
- Pough, F. Harvey; Janis, Christine. M.; Heiser, John B. (2005) [1979]. Vertebrate Life (7th ed.). Pearson. ISBN 0-13-127836-3.
- Stuart, Chris; Stuart, Mathilde (2017). Stuarts' Field Guide to the Larger Mammals of Africa (4th ed.). Penguin Random House South Africa. ISBN 978-1-77584-276-7.
- Supriatna, Jatna (2022). Field Guide to the Primates of Indonesia. Springer Nature. ISBN 978-3-03-083206-3.
- Wrangham, Richard (1982). Current Problems in Sociobiology. Cambridge University Press. ISBN 0-521-24203-7.
