= Collared titi monkey =

Collared titi

Conservation status
- Least Concern (IUCN 3.1)

Scientific classification
- Kingdom: Animalia
- Phylum: Chordata
- Class: Mammalia
- Order: Primates
- Family: Pitheciidae
- Genus: Cheracebus
- Species: C. torquatus

Binomial name
- Cheracebus torquatus (Hoffmannsegg, 1807)
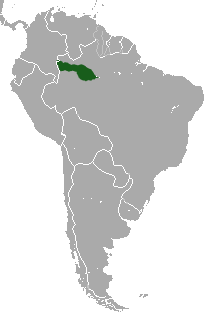
- Collared titi range

Synonyms
- Callicebus torquatus Hoffmannsegg, 1807; Cheracebus purinus (Thomas, 1927)

Species of New World monkey

The collared titi monkey (Cheracebus torquatus) is a species of titi, a type of New World monkey. It is endemic to northern Brazil.

== Taxonomy ==
At the end of the 1980s, the genus Callicebus was revised from the Hershkovitz concept of three species to thirteen neotropical species, with the collared titi, Callicebus torquatus, having four subspecies. In 2001, Colin Groves elevated one of the subspecies, the Colombian black-handed titi, C. t. medemi, to Callicebus medemi and a year later Van Roosmalen et al. elevated the remaining subspecies to species. These last changes were made with few arguments to support the changes and were apparently influenced by the increasing use of the so-called phylogenetic species concept of Cracraft, which seeks to define species as the "smallest diagnosable cluster of individual organisms within which there is a parental pattern of ancestry and descent."

The species complex was updated to Cheracebus in 2016. The recent discovery of a diploid number of 16 for the black titi, Cheracebus lugens, in Brazil suggested that (with the previously known 2n=20 of another, unidentified population of C. torquatus) there are at least two species in this complex. But whether the Lucifer titi, Cheracebus lucifer, or the Colombian black-handed titi, Cheracebus medemi, were good species from this complex was in doubt. However, a 2020 study prove them to be distinct species from C. torquatus. However, the same study found the Rio Purus titi (C. purinus), previously thought to be endemic to Brazil, to be conspecific with the collared titi, with the type locality and specimen of C. torquatus being from populations attributed to C. purinus; thus, C. purinus was synonymized with C. torquatus. The American Society of Mammalogists, the IUCN Red List, and ITIS follow this synonymization.

== Physical description ==
Five adults weighed an average of 1462 g (range 1410–1722 g) with a head-body length of around 290–390 mm and a tail length of about 350–400 mm. The face has very little hair, being limited to sparse short white hairs over a black skin. There is no sexual dimorphism, although the male has canines a bit longer than the female. The species has the smallest karyotype known for primates, 2n=16 recently described by Bonvicino et al.

The pelage is typically uniformly reddish brown or blackish brown. The tail is blackish mixed with some reddish hairs with hands and feet whitish or dark brown. This pelage contrasts in all of the subspecies with a band of white hair which extends upward from the chest and follows the neck, prolonging itself to the ears. This extension to the ears is weak, different from the other Cheracebus species which have white extending to the base of the ears.

== Geographic distribution and habitat ==
This species is thought to be restricted to Brazil, although it may range into adjacent Colombia. It is found south to the Tapauá River or potentially the Pauiní River, west to the Apaporis and Vaupés rivers, north to the Uaupés River and Rio Negro, and as far east as the town of Manacapurú. If it ranges into Colombia, it may potentially hybridize with the black titi (C. lugens) where their ranges overlap.

The collared titi is seen most frequently in well-developed, tall forest with a closed canopy, usually over terra firme, but not exclusively so. The species also enters extensive várzea forest, especially if the forest is tall and well-developed. Such várzea forest contrasts with the habitat needs of the coppery titi, which also uses várzea forest and more commonly so. But the coppery titi survives in low, vine-covered, "poor" forest where the collared titi is rarely found.

== Conservation status ==
The collared titi is not considered to be endangered, but where there are many colonists this primate tends to disappear, due to deforestation. The species is commonly hunted and eaten by indigenous peoples or used as bait for hunting larger carnivores or for fishing; however, where there is plenty of forest meat the species is found commonly close to indigenous settlements. The species is classified Least Concern (formerly LR) in the IUCN Red List.
