= Black titi =

Black titi may refer to:

- Black titi monkey, the monkey species Cheracebus lugens
- Black titi, the plant species Cliftonia monophylla
