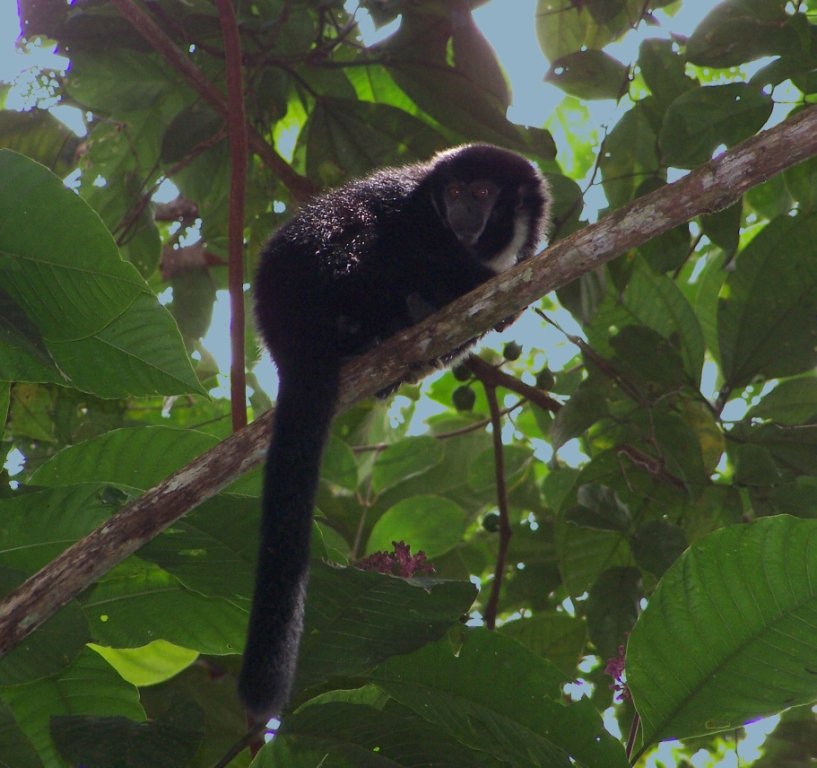
- Black titi (Cheracebus lugens)

Scientific classification
- Kingdom: Animalia
- Phylum: Chordata
- Class: Mammalia
- Order: Primates
- Suborder: Haplorhini
- Family: Pitheciidae
- Subfamily: Callicebinae
- Genus: Cheracebus; Byrne et al., 2016

Type species
- Simia lugens Humboldt, 1811

Species
- Cheracebus lucifer Cheracebus lugens Cheracebus medemi Cheracebus regulus Cheracebus torquatus

= Cheracebus =

Genus of New World monkeys

Cheracebus is one of three genera of titi monkeys. Monkeys in this genus, particularly the type species Cheracebus lugens, are sometimes referred to as widow titi monkeys.

Historically, titis were monogeneric, comprising only the genus Callicebus Thomas, 1903. Owing to the great diversity found across titi monkey species, a new genus-level taxonomy was recently proposed that recognises three genera within the subfamily Callicebinae; Cheracebus Byrne et al., 2016 for the species of the torquatus group (Widow titis); Plecturocebus Byrne et al., 2016 for the Amazonian and Chaco titis of the moloch and donacophilus groups; and Callicebus Thomas, 1903 sensu stricto, for species of the Atlantic Forest personatus group.

Cheracebus is derived from the Latin chera (from the Greek χηρα) meaning widow and cebus (from the Greek κῆβος) meaning long tailed monkey.

== Species ==
There are 5 species in this genus:

- Lucifer titi monkey, Cheracebus lucifer
- Black titi monkey, Cheracebus lugens
- Colombian black-handed titi monkey, Cheracebus medemi
- Red-headed titi monkey, Cheracebus regulus
- Collared titi monkey, Cheracebus torquatus

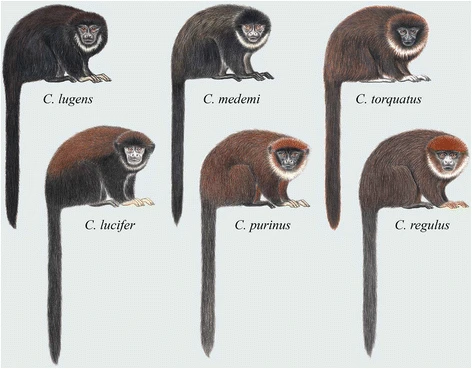
Cheracebus species
