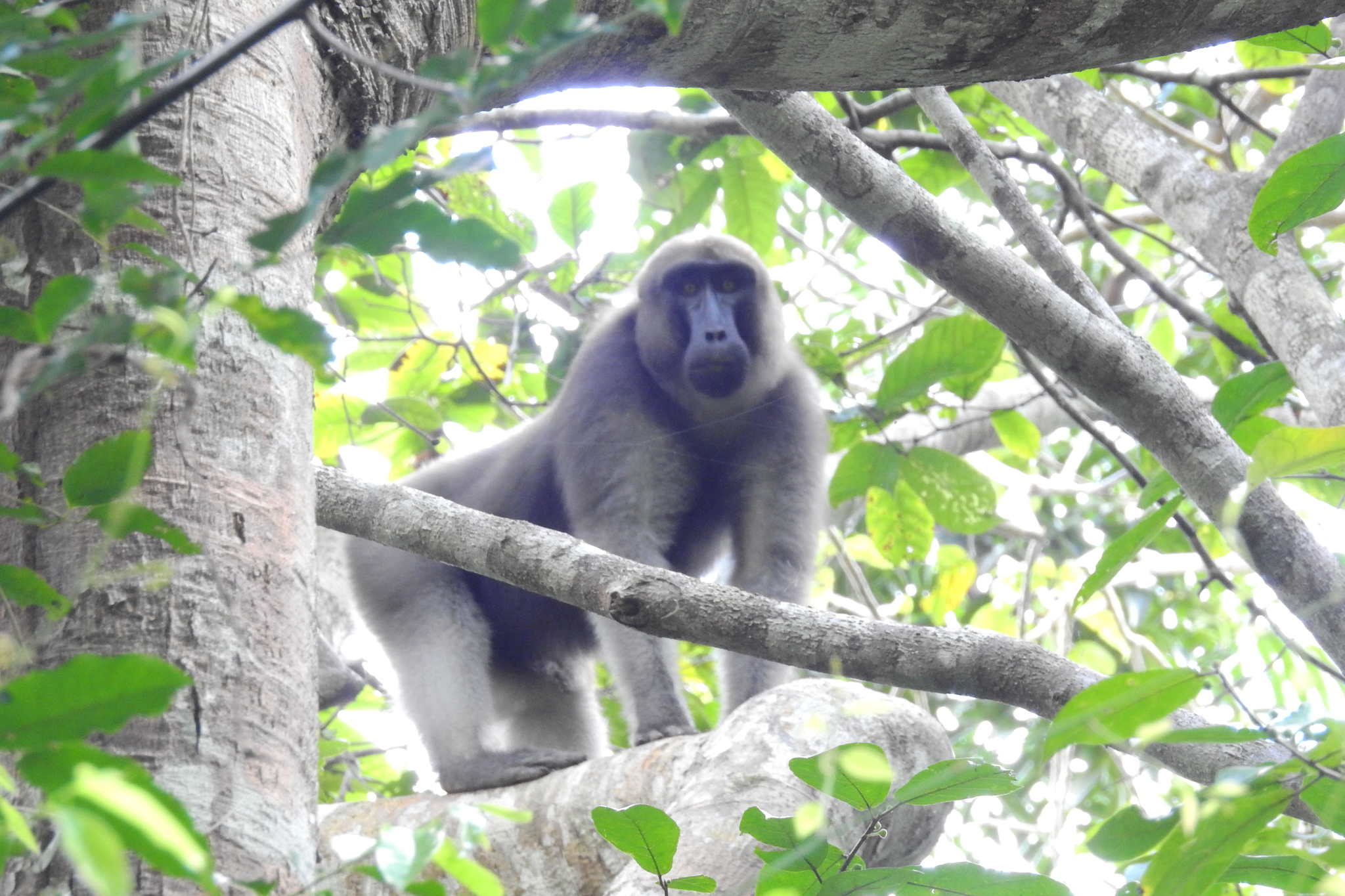

Conservation status
- Vulnerable (IUCN 3.1)

Scientific classification
- Kingdom: Animalia
- Phylum: Chordata
- Class: Mammalia
- Order: Primates
- Family: Cercopithecidae
- Genus: Macaca
- Species: M. ochreata
- Subspecies: M. o. brunnescens

Trinomial name
- Macaca ochreata brunnescens (Matschie, 1901)
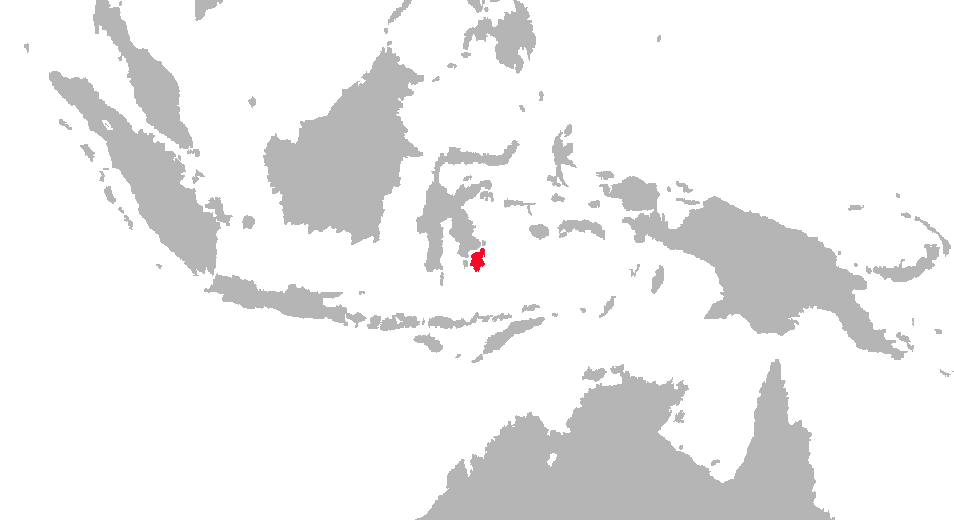

= Muna-Buton macaque =

Subspecies of Old World monkey

The Muna-Buton macaque (Macaca ochreata brunnescens) is a macaque sub-species found in the Indonesian archipelago of Sulawesi. It is found on two small islands off the south-east coast–Buton and Muna. This Old World monkey is diurnal and arboreal. It is black with boot like patches of skin. It is classified as vulnerable species on the IUCN Red List.

== Taxonomy ==
Muna-Buton macaque is a sub-species of the booted macaque. It was first described by German zoologist Paul Matschie in 1901.

== Morphology ==
Muna Buton macaque has a head to tail length of about 475–495 mm (18.7–19.5 in) in length. Like other Sulawesi macaques, it has a reduced tail of only about 35 mm (1.4 in) in length. Males are slightly larger than the females. The Muna Buton macaques are slightly smaller than the booted macaques found in the mainland Sulawesi, and have narrower heads. The fur is predominantly black in color with a brownish gray mane fanning out of the face hiding the ears. The fur around the limbs are lighter in color. The macaques have boot-like lighter patches of fur around their limbs and slightly darker patches on their torsos.

== Distribution and habitat ==
Muna-Buton macaque is found only on two small islands of Buton and Muna located to the south-east of Sulawesi in Indonesia. It is classified as vulnerable species on the IUCN Red List.

== Behaviour ==
The macaque is diurnal and arboreal. It lives in small social groups and uses various forms of vocalizations, facial expressions, and body postures to communicate amongst themselves. There is no strict hierarchy in the groups and the members are freely allowed to socialize with the others. The diet of Muna-Buton macaque consists of over 60% fruits including figs and pandanus fruits. It also feeds on leaves, insects, flowers, and bark. It is a very successful crop-raider, and if there are agricultural fields nearby, it will spend up to 2 hours at a time raiding farmers crops, such as sweet potato, maize, papaya, and banana.
