= Red-headed titi monkey =

Red-headed titi

Conservation status
- Least Concern (IUCN 3.1)

Scientific classification
- Kingdom: Animalia
- Phylum: Chordata
- Class: Mammalia
- Infraclass: Placentalia
- Order: Primates
- Family: Pitheciidae
- Genus: Cheracebus
- Species: C. regulus

Binomial name
- Cheracebus regulus (Thomas, 1927)
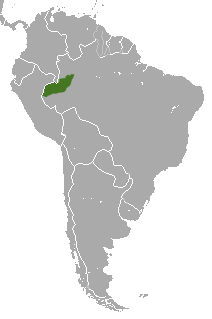
- Red-headed titi range

Synonyms
- Callicebus regulus Thomas, 1927

Species of New World monkey

The red-headed titi monkey (Cheracebus regulus) is a species of titi, a type of New World monkey, endemic to Brazil. It was originally described as Callicebus regulus in 1927.
