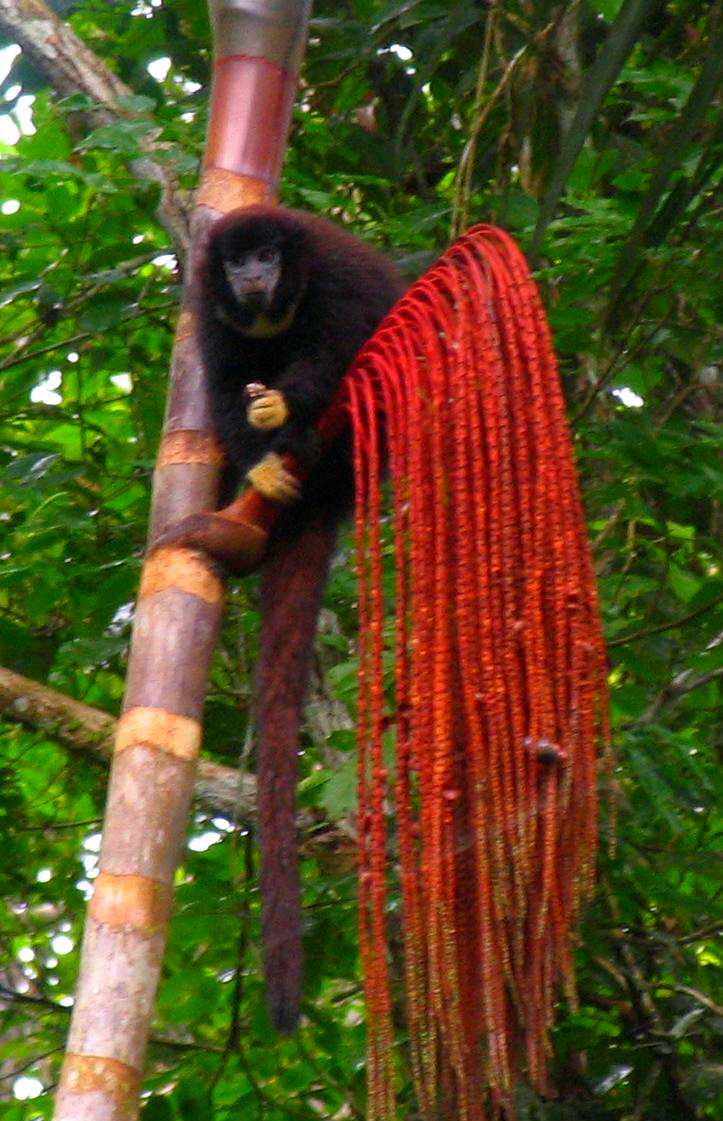

Conservation status
- Least Concern (IUCN 3.1)

Scientific classification
- Kingdom: Animalia
- Phylum: Chordata
- Class: Mammalia
- Infraclass: Placentalia
- Order: Primates
- Family: Pitheciidae
- Genus: Cheracebus
- Species: C. lucifer

Binomial name
- Cheracebus lucifer (Thomas, 1914)
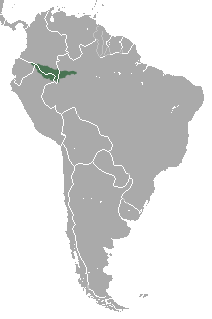
- Lucifer titi range

Synonyms
- Callicebus lucifer Thomas, 1914

= Lucifer titi monkey =

Lucifer titi

Species of New World monkey

The Lucifer titi monkey (Cheracebus lucifer) is a species of titi, a type of New World monkey, from South America. It is found in Brazil, Colombia, Ecuador, and Peru. It was described as Callicebus lucifer in 1914. The Lucifer titi has previously been treated as part of C. torquatus, the collared titi.

== Distribution ==
This species occurs near the interfluve north of the Solimões and Napo Rivers, and south of the Japurá River. The Lucifer titi is found in lowland Colombian Amazonia up to about 500 m (1,600 ft) of altitude in Putumayo and probably about the same in Caquetá. Outside of Colombia this species extends from the Napo River northward to the Ecuadorian Amazon.

== Description ==
The pelage of this species is basically blackish but intermixed with many hairs on the back (extending to the top of the crown) and flanks with many reddish brown hairs, giving the animal a definite reddish appearance in the sunlight.

== Behavior ==
=== Reproduction ===
Robinson et al. also report a birth season of December to January for the species in Peru at 4ºS. Why this specific birth season should be chosen by the species in such widely divergent places both north and south of the equator with different phenological cycles must remain for the moment an open question. The newborn quickly acclimates to being carried by the male, and usually goes to the female for nursing only.
