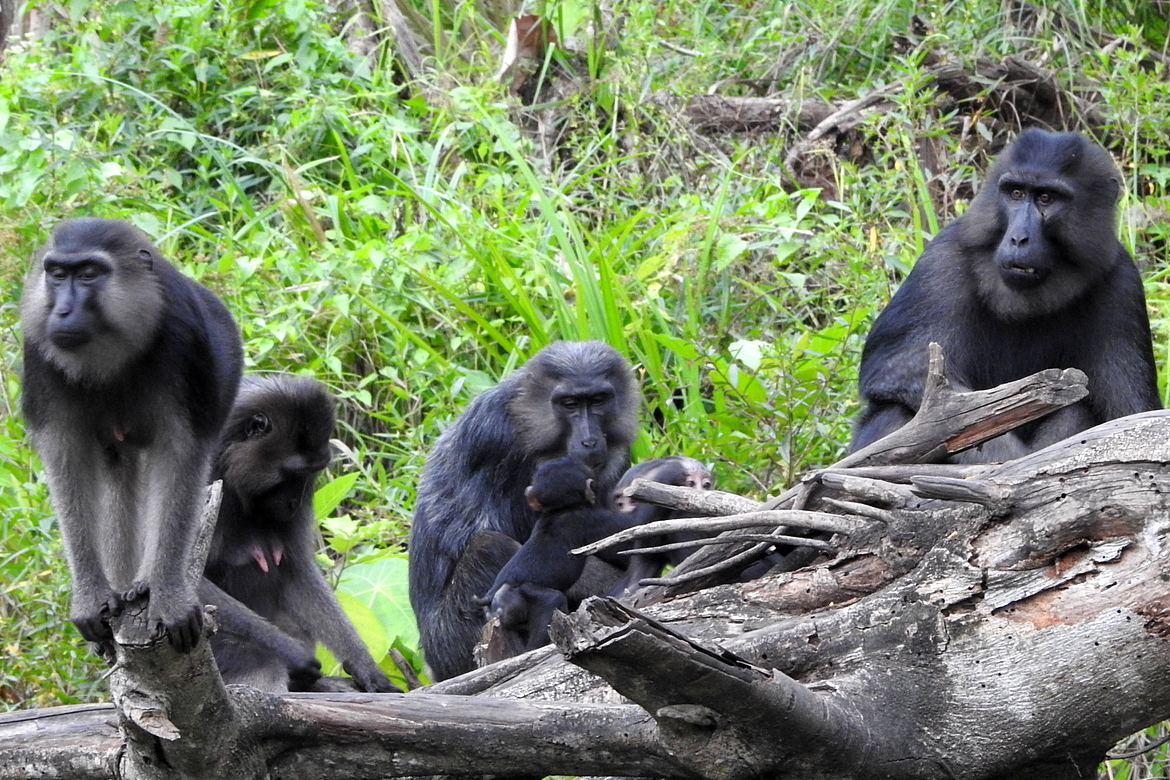

Conservation status
- Vulnerable (IUCN 3.1)

Scientific classification
- Kingdom: Animalia
- Phylum: Chordata
- Class: Mammalia
- Infraclass: Placentalia
- Order: Primates
- Family: Cercopithecidae
- Genus: Macaca
- Species: M. ochreata

Binomial name
- Macaca ochreata (Ogilby, 1841)
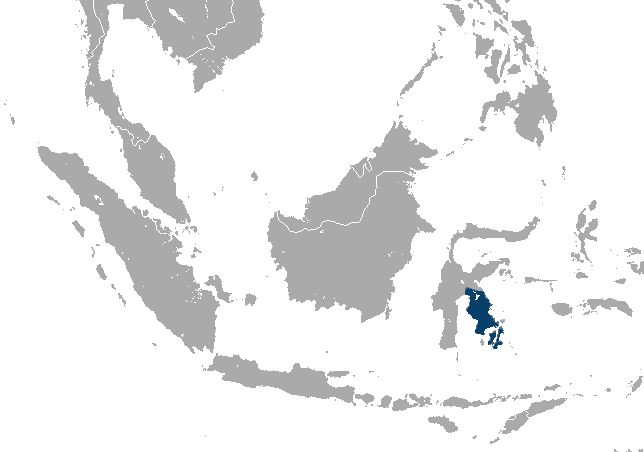
- Booted macaque range

= Booted macaque =

Species of Old World monkey

The booted macaque (Macaca ochreata) is a macaque of the Sulawesi Island, Indonesia. This Old World monkey is diurnal and spends most of the day in the trees. It is 50–59 cm long plus a tail of 35–40 cm.

The booted macaque feeds on figs, buds, invertebrates and cereals.

Two subspecies are recognized:

- M. o. ochreata
- Muna-Buton macaque, M. o. brunnescens
