= Colombian black-handed titi monkey =

Colombian black-handed titi

Conservation status
- Vulnerable (IUCN 3.1)

Scientific classification
- Kingdom: Animalia
- Phylum: Chordata
- Class: Mammalia
- Infraclass: Placentalia
- Order: Primates
- Family: Pitheciidae
- Genus: Cheracebus
- Species: C. medemi

Binomial name
- Cheracebus medemi (Hershkovitz, 1963)
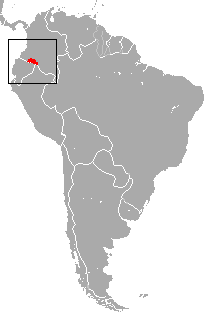
- Colombian black-handed titi range

Synonyms
- Callicebus medemi Hershkovitz, 1963

Species of New World monkey

The Colombian black-handed titi monkey (Cheracebus medemi) is a species of titi, a type of New World monkey, endemic to Colombia. It was originally described in the genus Callicebus in 1963.

== Description ==
Colombian black-handed titis are relatively small primates with a fluffy coat and a long, bushy tail. This is longer than the body and cannot be used as a prehensile tail. The fur is predominantly black, and in contrast to closely related species, so are the hands. The head is small and roundish, along the throat a white or yellow, collar-like marking extends to the ears.

== Distribution and habitat ==
Colombian black-handed titis are restricted to southern Colombia. Their range is located in the departments of Caquetá and Putumayo. The habitat of this species is tropical rainforests.

== Behavioral ecology and nutrition ==
Their behaviour has not been studied much. They live in family groups in which they stay together as a monogamous pair - usually for life - together with their common offspring. They are territorial, and express this by jointly emitting sounds when pairs from other groups enter their own territory. Their diet consists mainly of fruit. To a lesser extent they also eat other parts of plants and insects.
