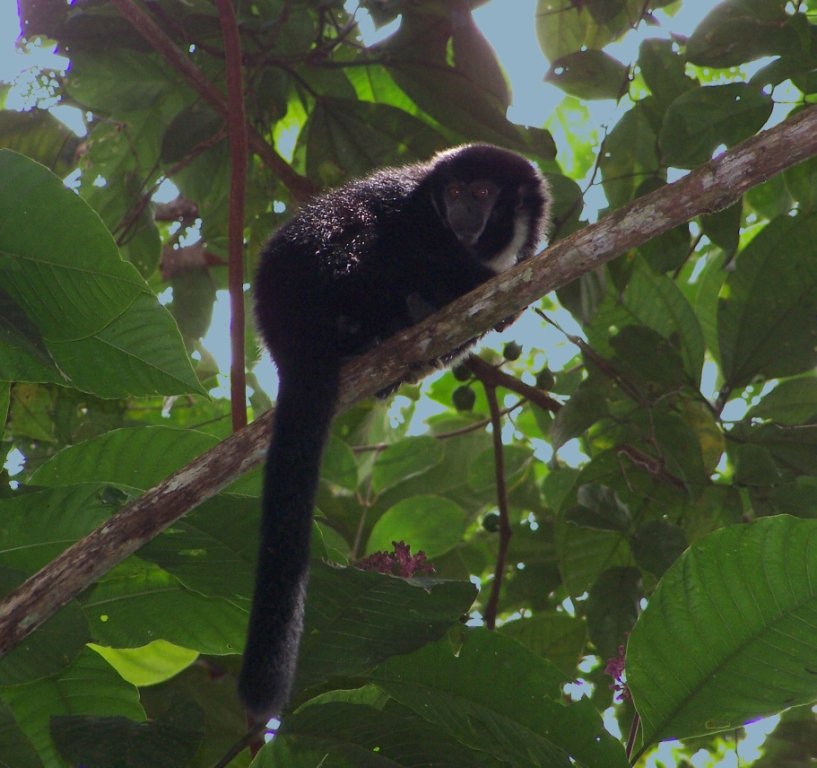

Conservation status
- Least Concern (IUCN 3.1)

Scientific classification
- Kingdom: Animalia
- Phylum: Chordata
- Class: Mammalia
- Infraclass: Placentalia
- Order: Primates
- Family: Pitheciidae
- Genus: Cheracebus
- Species: C. lugens

Binomial name
- Cheracebus lugens (Humboldt, 1811)
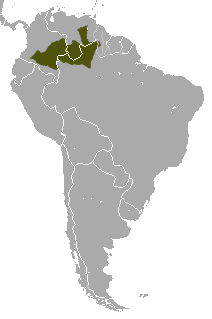
- Black titi range

Synonyms
- Callicebus lugens Humboldt, 1811

= Black titi monkey =

Black titi

Species of New World monkey

The black titi monkey (Cheracebus lugens), is a species of titi, a type of New World monkey, from South America. It is found in Brazil, Colombia, and Venezuela. It was described in 1811 as Callicebus lugens. It is sometimes called the widow monkey.

== Distribution ==
This species has the largest range of the Cheracebus species, ranging from the Branco River and Rio Negro north to the Orinoco and Caqueta river basins.

The species has been observed on the left bank of the Guayabero River,, where it was collected in 1959 by Jorge Hernández Camacho, both in La Macarena National Park, and recently it was observed by the Colombian biologist Rocío Palanco north of the Guayabero above La Cordillera de los Picachos National Park. The species is found in the Vichada selva between the Vichada and Guaviare Rivers and the northernmost Colombian population extends north of the Vichada River, reaching the middle Tomo River, where it probably extends to the upper Tomo, although this needs to be confirmed.

The black titi is not found on the lower Tomo or lower Tuparro River nor on the north bank of the lower Vichada River, contrary to the distribution map of Hershkovitz. This error is due to the collection of a specimen by the English ornithologist Cherrie in about 1904 from Maipures, which may have been a captive animal obtained in the village, since extensive and concerted efforts have failed to identify it for the entire area mentioned above; nor is it known by locals for this area. The nearest titi monkeys from Maipures in Colombia are found on the middle Tuparro River and south of the lower Vichada River.

== Description ==
The pelage is generally blackish mixed with dark brownish and some reddish brown hairs on the back and the flanks. Hands are white or yellowish.

== Natural history ==
Social groups are made up of a monogamous pair and one or two of its young. A count of ten groups in Vichada yielded an average of 3.5 per group. Occasionally groups of five are seen and unpaired individuals ("floaters") can also be detected from time to time. Second year youngsters usually leave the group, although they may make it into the third year before leaving. These young animals sometimes appear, moving peripherally to the group and then disappear again to move alone.

Measured home ranges have varied from about 15–25 ha. Appropriate habitat contains 4–5 groups/km^{2} (14 + "floaters"), which may add another 8–10 individuals to the total ecological density/km^{2}. The average day range calculated by Kinzey (1977) and Kinzey et al. (1977) was 819.4 m (n=22 days) for a research project in Peru and at the Estación Biológica Caparú the average was 807.2 m (range 513.7 – 1070 m, n=26).

Easley calculated a time budget based on 400 hours of observation as 62.7% rest, 16.5% moving, 16.1% feeding, 2.7% grooming, 1.6% playing and 0.3% vocalizing. Palacios & Rodríguez calculated 54.3% rest, 22.9% moving, 17.6% feeding, 4.07% grooming, 0.41% playing, and 0.42% vocalizing based on 240 hours of observation.

Easley analyzed the locomotive and positional behavior of the species showing that it is a generalized quadruped using quadrupedal walking and running about 66.8% of the time. This species also engages in active jumping (23.9% of the time) and climbing 9.1% of the time). Sitting (62%3% is the most common posture, followed by lying (16.1%), walking (10.4%), jumping (4%), vertical clinging (3.1%), climbing (1.5%), running (0.8%), hanging suspended by the back legs (0.8%), horizontal clinging (0.7%) and standing 0.2%). If postures of locomotor behaviors are excluded from this analysis then the scores were sitting (74.8%), lying (19.3%), vertical clinging (3.7%), hanging suspended from the hind foot (0.9%), horizontal clinging (0.8%) and standing (0.2%). Previously Kinzey & Rosenberger had pointed out that these animals fit into the "clinging and leaping" group of primates. Groups of collared titis sleep on top of large branches of emergent trees, frequently a bit above the level of the main canopy.

=== Diet ===
Although fruits are the major portion of this primate's diet, invertebrates and leaves are also consumed to a smaller degree. Lepidopteran larva, spiders and orthopterans are especially eaten with relish and probably occasional small lizards, judging by the hunting preferences of a tame, free-ranging adult female, which lived at the Caparú Biological Research Station on the lower Apaporis River.

Kinzey found the following range of dietary preference during his 135 hours study in Peru: 14% Clarisia racemosa (Moraceae); 13% unidentified (Guttifereae); 7% Pithecellobium sp. (Convolvulaceae); Jessenia bataua (Arecaceae); Psychotrian axillaris (Rubiaceae); Guatteria elata (Annonaceae); Virola sp. (Myristicaceae).

Easley identified frequency of item choice in the diet of the same groups as above: 74.1% fruits, 15.8% insects, 8.8% leaves, 0.6% buds and flowers and 0.1% other. Of the 57 fruit species identified, the palm tree, Jessenia polycarpa, was the most commonly eaten in 22.7% of the feeding observations. The following lists the range of preference observed in this study: 22.7% Jessenis polycarpa (Arecaceae), 7.9% Ocotea no. 1 (Lauraceae); 6.6% Tachigalia sp. (Caesalpiniaceae); 5.9% Beilschmiedia sp. (Lauraceae); 5.8% Ocotea no. 2 (Lauraceae); 4.8% unidentified; 3.5% unidentified; 3.5% Guatteria sp. (Annonaceae); 3.4% Annona sp. (Annonaceae); 2.4% unidentified; 2.0% unidentified; Guatteria sp. (Annonaceae); 1.9% Duguetia sp. (Annonaceae).

Palacios & Rodríguez and Palacios et al. identified 62 species from 32 plant familias in the diet of a study group of black titis in the Estación Biológica Caparú in eastern Colombia. The preference values of each family, according to species utilized is as follow: Myristicaceae (25.02%); Euphorbiaceae (15.28%); Moraceae (14.37%); Arecaceae (8.68%); Caesalpiniaceae (7.85%) Rubiaceae (5.10%); Chrysobalanaceae (4.41%); Annonaceae (4.19%); Cecropiaceae (4.03%); Araceae (1.95%); Elaeocarpaceae (1.78%); Dilleniaceae (1.69%), Combretaceae (1.17%), Apocynaceae (1%); Aquifoliaceae (1%), Meliaceae (0.88%); Sapotaceae (0.85%); Burseraceae (0.81%); Apocynaceae (0.67%); Monimiaceae (0.23%); Piperaceae (0.22%); Melastomaceae (0.18%); Humiriaceae (0.13%) Celastracezae (0.11%); Myrtaceae (0.09%); Lecythidaceae (0.08%); Aquifoliaceae (0.07%); Sterculiaceae (0.07%); Solanaceae (0.05%); Clusiaceae (0.02%).

The most important species consumed during six months in this study are listed as follows: 13.88% Sandwithia heterocalyx (Euphorbiaceae); 10% Virola melinonii (Myristicaceae); 8.35% Iryanthera ulei (Myristicaceae); 7.06 Oenocarpus bataua (Arecaceae); 6.53% Heterostemon conjugatus (Caesalbiniaceae); 5.10% Coussarea sp. (Rubiaceae); 5.02% Ficus sp. (Moraceae); 4.53% Iryanthera crassifolia (Myristicaceae); 3.84% Helicostylis tomentosa (Moraceae); 3.39% Brosimum rubescens (Moraceae).

=== Reproduction ===
The estrus cycle seems to be about 16 days, based on observations of 14 cycles of a tame, free-ranging female which lived at the Estación Biológica Caparú (Vaupés, Colombia). During the period of receptivity (which lasts 2–3 days) the black labia and the clitoris became swollen and hard and behavior changes occurred. During the receptive period the female became much more affectionate towards its human "parents", purred loudly, somewhat like a cat and crouched in a lordotic position when the base of the tail was stimulated. Contrariwise to her increased affection towards her perceived "family unit" (or two humans), she became much more aggressive than normal towards any "outsiders" (i.e. other human beings). During estrus the female tongue-flicked frequently, using this signal in two opposite contexts; she tongue-flicked as she attempted to approach her favorite humans while she also tongue-flicked as a preliminary to attach on other (especially male) humans.

One recognizable pair at the Estación Biológica Caparú had been observed together for 14 years and was said to be still together at least four years more after this author had left. During the 14 years the pair produced 10 young, all of which survived the first year. During four years no young were produced.

In Vichada young are usually produced in December or early January. This is a difficult season with sharply reduced fruit resources for many animals in this part of the country (which has an annual precipitation of about 2400 mm; a long dry season is just taking hold and January and February present only a very few millimeters of precipitation for each month. A close analysis of the diet of the black titi here would be interesting, inasmuch as it would serve to identify the resources which allow the species to have this birth pattern.

On the Guayabero River near La Macarena the birth season is apparently about the same time as in Vichada. On the lower Apaporis River in Vaupés with about 3815 mm of precipitation throughout the year, the birth season is also centered around December, although some outlying births are known as early as the first of October. Nevertheless, the birth season is the same as the other two sites, despite the lack of a strong dry season. However, we know that fleshy fruits are beginning to increase from their yearly low during this time, so the question of resource use by the species remains very interesting.

=== Communication ===
The black titi is very affectionate within the family unit, but the adult pair is aggressive towards neighboring pairs. The most common interaction with neighbors is counter-singing of the pairs, where one pair waits listening while the other pair vocalizes their duet, later the listeners answer, while the first vocalizers listen. There are instances when two pairs interchange vocalizations from very close together or from almost the same place in the forest. Sometimes these emotional interactions may finish in chases by the pair or an individual against the others. Rodríguez & Palacios (1994) found evidence of different types of agonistic interactions between different pairs.

Vocalizations of this species are very complex, especially a long-call display utilized by these animals, perhaps to regulate spacing and defined territory. Surprisingly, experimental playback of solo male calls caused the owners of a particular territory to move away from the recording, and recordings of duetting caused the territory owners to duet in return and to travel parallel to the speaker. However, any approximate sound stimulus can cause duetting of territory owners, and many direct observations of duetting neighbors were observed to cause the territorial owners to move towards the calling, where they sometimes confronted each other across a small space.

There is some evidence that titis not only can determine sex from a long call but can identify duetting individuals, so it should perhaps not be surprising that a resident pair could distinguish a recording from a live monkey and move away from it.

A human-raised and newly matured female black titi on first shouting, attracted the resident forest group to come closer until they became accustomed to her presence, although they always answered her calling with their duetting, later neither coming closer nor moving away. The female's vocalizations sometimes attracted several individual males in short order, which attempted to duet with the female. Since the female had been raised by humans, she did not show interest in duetting with the newly appeared males nor in establishing a relationship with them, and the males eventually desisted and left. The only exception to this was one male which attempted to establish a relationship during two years before giving up and leaving during an accidental 26-day absence of the female when she became inadvertently lost in the forest.

Some vocalizations of black titi are listed here:

1. Morning duet – the most commonly heard vocalization of the pair, singing in duet, complex and utilized to defend territory; it is interchanged with neighboring groups as counter-singing
2. Danger peep – various soft, high-pitched peeps but sometimes low intensity, advising of danger; very difficult to localize
3. Purr – sounds very much like a cat's purr; used by all members of the group to show contentment, affection or request for food, grooming or contact;
4. Rough growl – given by young animals when complaining of rain or when greeting adults
5. Sharp scream – when fighting to express extra disgust
6. Play growl – low, gargling growl used in play and changing in tone, terminating in interrogative tone
7. Soft whine – especially young animals but also adults when requesting something of another such as food or while grooming another
8. Bark – loud, sharp and sudden bark when molested by the unwelcome close presence of other larger primates such as Lagothrix, Cebus, Ateles or raptors.

Individuals of both sexes occasionally mark their chests with pungent wadded leaves, rubbing the leaf up onto the throat and chin to the mouth, where the wad is wetted and rubbed down again, repeated various times while looking up into the air. One wild male did this as he approached the tame estrus female, who was near a building, after this male had left the forest and while walking on the elevated poles which had been set up for monkey travel. Another foraging female marked herself in the presence of an observing human who was 20 m (66 ft) from her.

Displays are similar to the coppery titi, which were first described by Moynihan (1966, 1967, 1976a). Some displays are listed here: (1) piloerection – agonistic; excited state when attacked or attacking; during danger; (2) arched-back – agonistic; before some attacks or when threatened; position held for several seconds; (3) tail twinning – when duetting or resting the pair often wind their tails around each other's tail; (4) tongue flicking – in two contexts; aggressive just before attack or as space reducer towards mate and probably just before copulation (hand-raised female at EBC tongue flicks at human "parent", especially at height of estrus cycle; (5) chest rubbing – using a wadded leaf the individual rubs from throat to chest after first wetting the leaf with saliva; performed in presence of human observer; nervousness.

Kinzey et al. observed play behavior only between the infant and male and between two juveniles. Agonistic behavior is common between neighboring groups and can sometimes results in fights, although usually the aggression is limited to intergroup vocalization.

=== Interspecific interactions and predators ===
The black titi usually attempts to move out of the path of passing troops of brown woolly monkey or tufted capuchin, although sometimes the small monkeys give a burst of loud and aggressive-sounding vocalization ("bark") when they are approached closely by the larger species. Titis frequently hides and shows much caution towards raptors. Being frightened causes them to give alarm peeps, probably because they must be especially alert to predators. A margay was detected alongside a dead black titi during recent censuses on the Purité River in Colombia, although the monkey was not freshly killed. The local group was no longer observed after this.

== Status ==
It is considered of least concern on the IUCN Red List. It may be protected in Chiribiquete National Park and El Tuparro National Park and in the two biological preserves Nukak and Puinawai.
