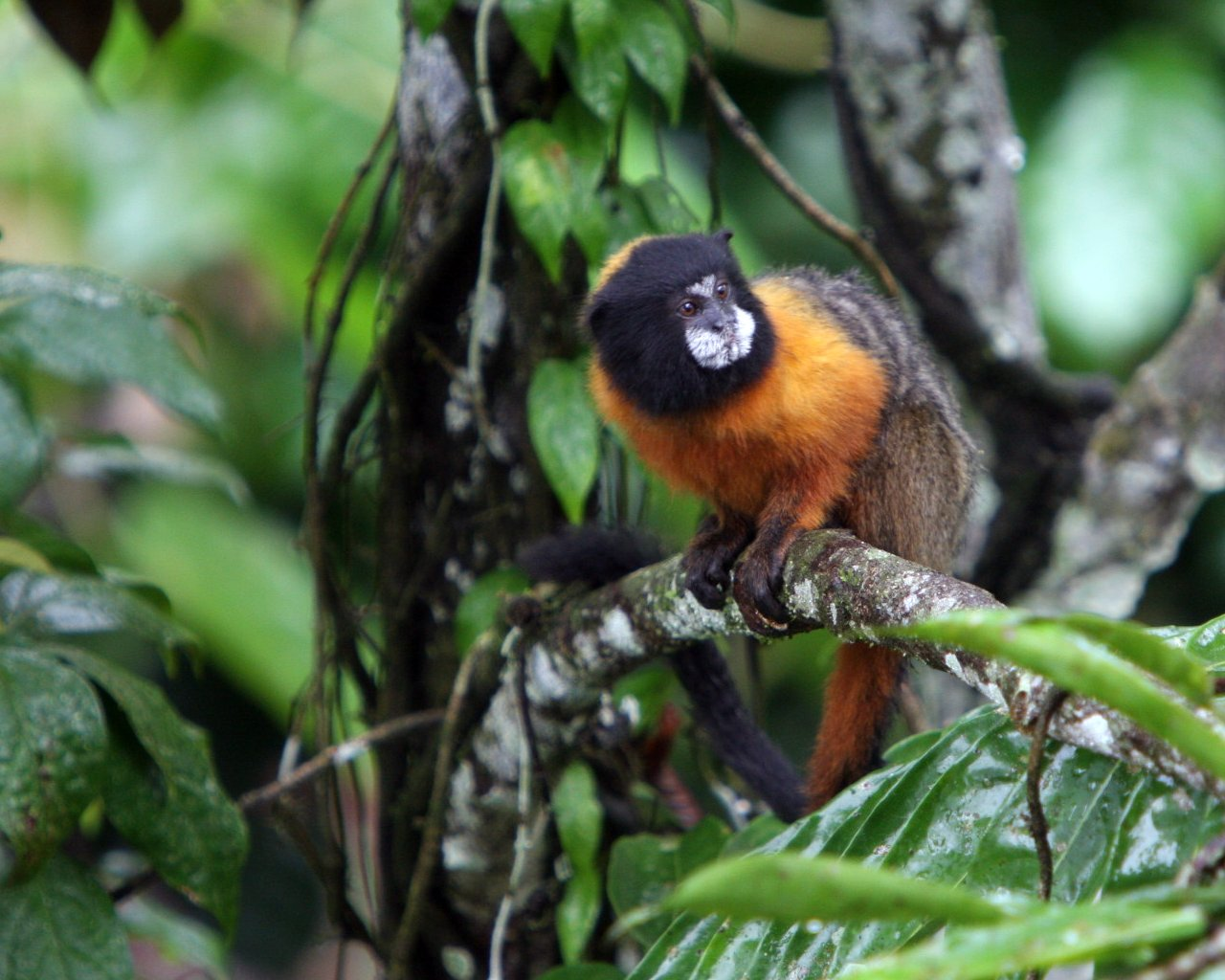

Conservation status
- Near Threatened (IUCN 3.1)

Scientific classification
- Kingdom: Animalia
- Phylum: Chordata
- Class: Mammalia
- Infraclass: Placentalia
- Order: Primates
- Family: Callitrichidae
- Genus: Leontocebus
- Species: L. tripartitus

Binomial name
- Leontocebus tripartitus (A. Milne-Edwards, 1878)
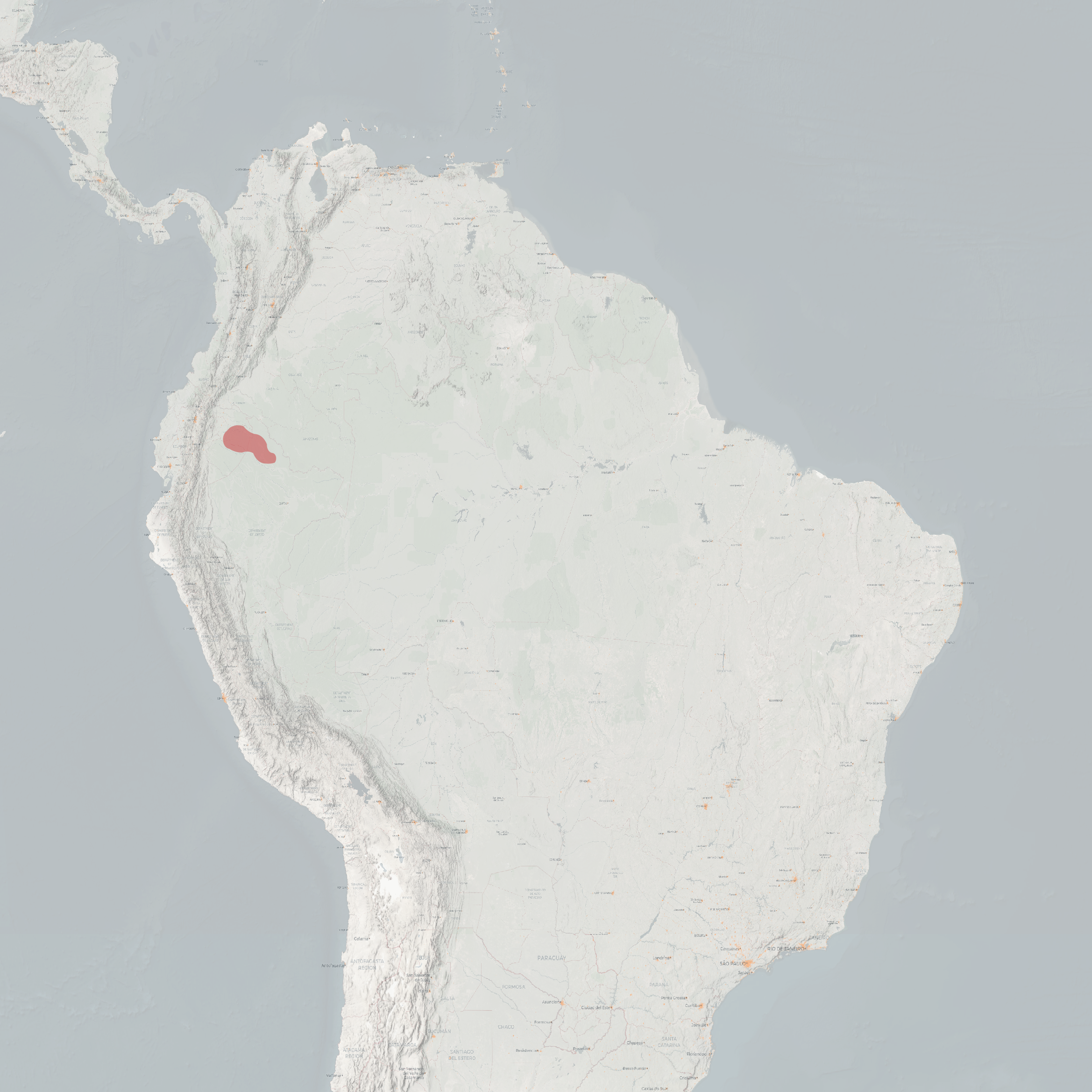
- Range of the Golden-mantled Saddle-back Tamarin

= Golden-mantled tamarin =

Species of New World monkey

The golden-mantled tamarin (Leontocebus tripartitus) is a tamarin species from South America. It is found in Ecuador and Peru, specifically in the upper Amazon (lowland), east of the Andes in Ecuador, and Northeast Peru; between the Rio Curaray and Rio Napo in Peru.

== Taxonomic classification ==
There has been some debate over the placing of L. tripartitus. In field observations in South America, scientists compared feeding habits and heights between golden-mantled tamarins (L. tripartitus) and brown-mantled tamarins (Leontocebus fuscicollis) and they concluded that patterns of height were very similar to those observed in L. fuscicollis. The similarity and the lack of evidence for sympatry with either L. fuscicollis or the black-mantled tamarin (Leontocebus nigricollis) led to the suggestion that L. tripartitus should be reconsidered as a subspecies of L. fuscicollis rather than a species on its own; alternatively, other subspecies of L. fuscicollis should be raised in taxonomic rank. It is currently considered a separate species within the saddle-back tamarin genus Leontocebus.

== Description ==
This tamarin measures 218–240 mm from the tip of the nose to the beginning of the tail and has a tail length of 316–341 mm. Its ear length is 31–32 mm. The head is black, with a black collar of hair continuous under the throat. The muzzle and sometimes face are pure white, and the neck has a ruff of bright golden to creamy fur dorsally, sharply contrasting with the black crown. Its underparts are orange. The long tail is not prehensile, as in all tamarins, and the large eyes face forward. The species is monomorphic. It has large canines and claw-like nails on all digits except the opposable.

== Behavior ==
The golden-mantled tamarin is an arboreal, diurnal species ranging through the understory, moving by quadrupedal walk and leap, mainly on small horizontal supports. Leaping is the main gap-crossing mode of locomotion, though it decreases in proportion with a higher use of the upper forest layers. It forages most actively between 4–10 meters off the forest floor, and eats mainly fruit, nectar and insects but also consumes gum from either natural holes or holes created by the pygmy marmoset. Due to its small body size, limited gut volume, and rapid rate of food passage, tamarins require a diet high in nutrient quality and available energy. Water accumulated on leaves, in flower cups, or in hollows is lapped; dew and moisture from a hand previously dipped in water are licked. Callitrichids do not suck up liquids or hold vessels to the mouth as do most cebids and catarrhines. The faculty of suckling, a specialization of the young, disappears soon after weaning. During the dry season they are known to be less active and more social due to low food sources.

=== Chemosignalling ===
Marmosets and tamarins possess a rich repertoire of chemosignalling behaviors. These are associated closely with investigatory behaviors. In all species, the most conspicuous and most frequently seen chemosignalling behaviors are stereotyped scent-marking patterns involving the circumgenital and suprapubic glands, urine, and the sternal gland. Most scent marking is performed on items in the environment. In addition, marking the bodies of partners has also been reported for several species.

== Reproduction ==
Tamarins live in small groups of usually four to nine individuals and have some interesting reproductive traits. They give birth to twins, and only one female (the dominant individual) breeds in any single social group. The hormones present in the dominant female's urine suppress the reproductive cycles in the subordinate females of the group. Groups are polygynandrous.

Gestation averages at 140 days. Callitrichids in general are unique in the intensity of their relations to infants. The newborns may be carried from the first day by group members other than the mother (including males in the group). Weaning occurs from 9–13 weeks, when most of the food ingested is obtained through sharing or stealing. At the juvenile stage (beginning at 4–7 months) 'twin fights' may occur, especially between same-sexed twins, to determine status differences. The sub-adult stage begins at 9–14 months, and the young animal has the size and appearance of an adult. Puberty takes place at this time but the young do not reproduce. At the adult stage (beginning at 12–21 months), sexual maturity is attained.

== Conservation status ==
In 2008, Leontocebus tripartitus was assessed by the IUCN Red List. This species is listed as Near Threatened in light of a projected future decline of around 25% over the course of three generations (18 years) due to anticipated high rates of deforestation. The forests where L. tripartitus occurs along the Rio Yasuni in Ecuador are remote and have, to date, suffered little impact from human activities, other than small localized encampments for petroleum prospecting. However, the occurrence of petroleum in the region, resulting in the current construction of the Pompeya-Iro highway, is reason for some concern for the future of these forests and their wildlife.
