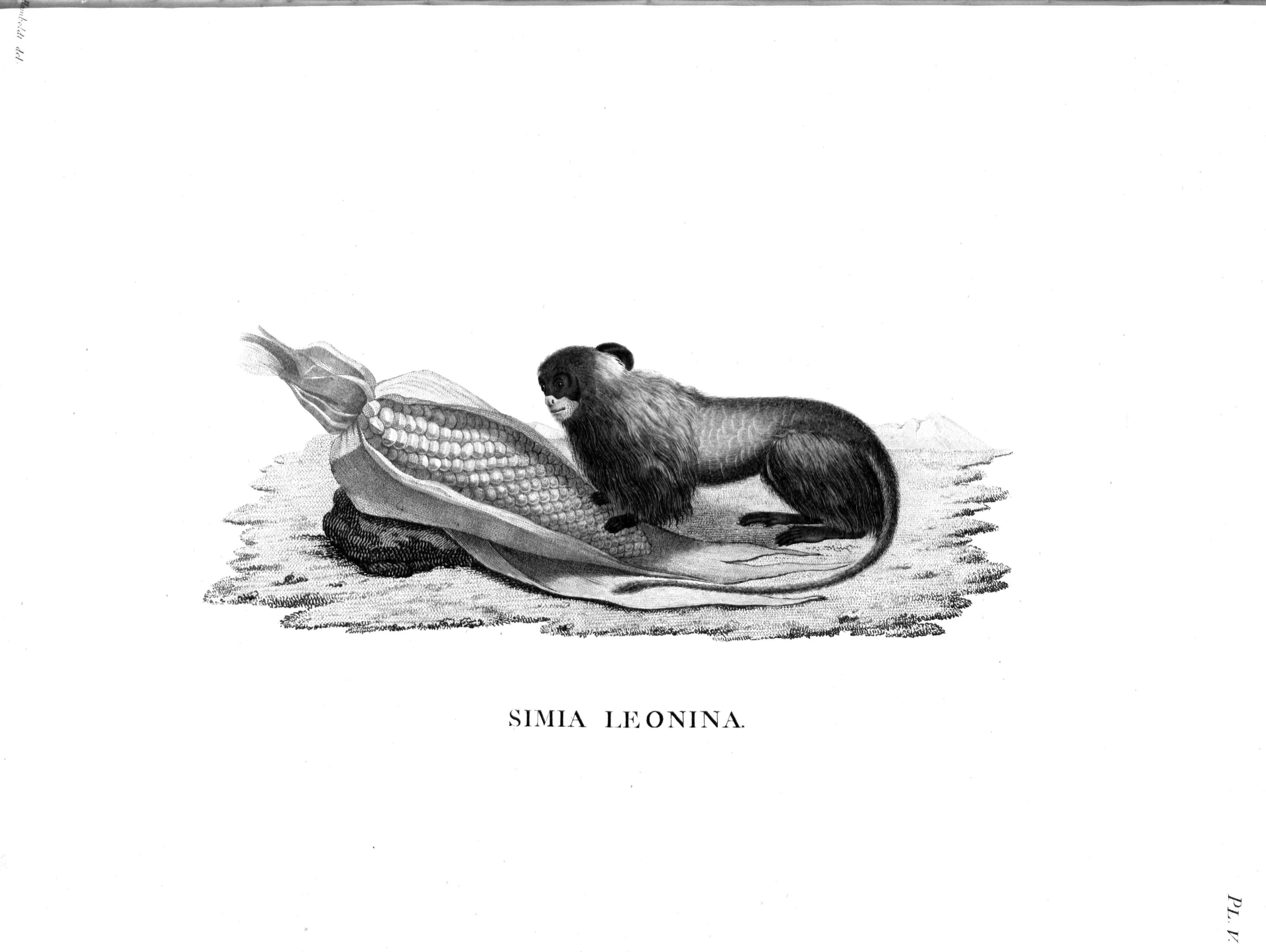

Conservation status
- Least Concern (IUCN 3.1)

Scientific classification
- Kingdom: Animalia
- Phylum: Chordata
- Class: Mammalia
- Infraclass: Placentalia
- Order: Primates
- Family: Callitrichidae
- Genus: Leontocebus
- Species: L. fuscus

Binomial name
- Leontocebus fuscus (Lesson, 1840)
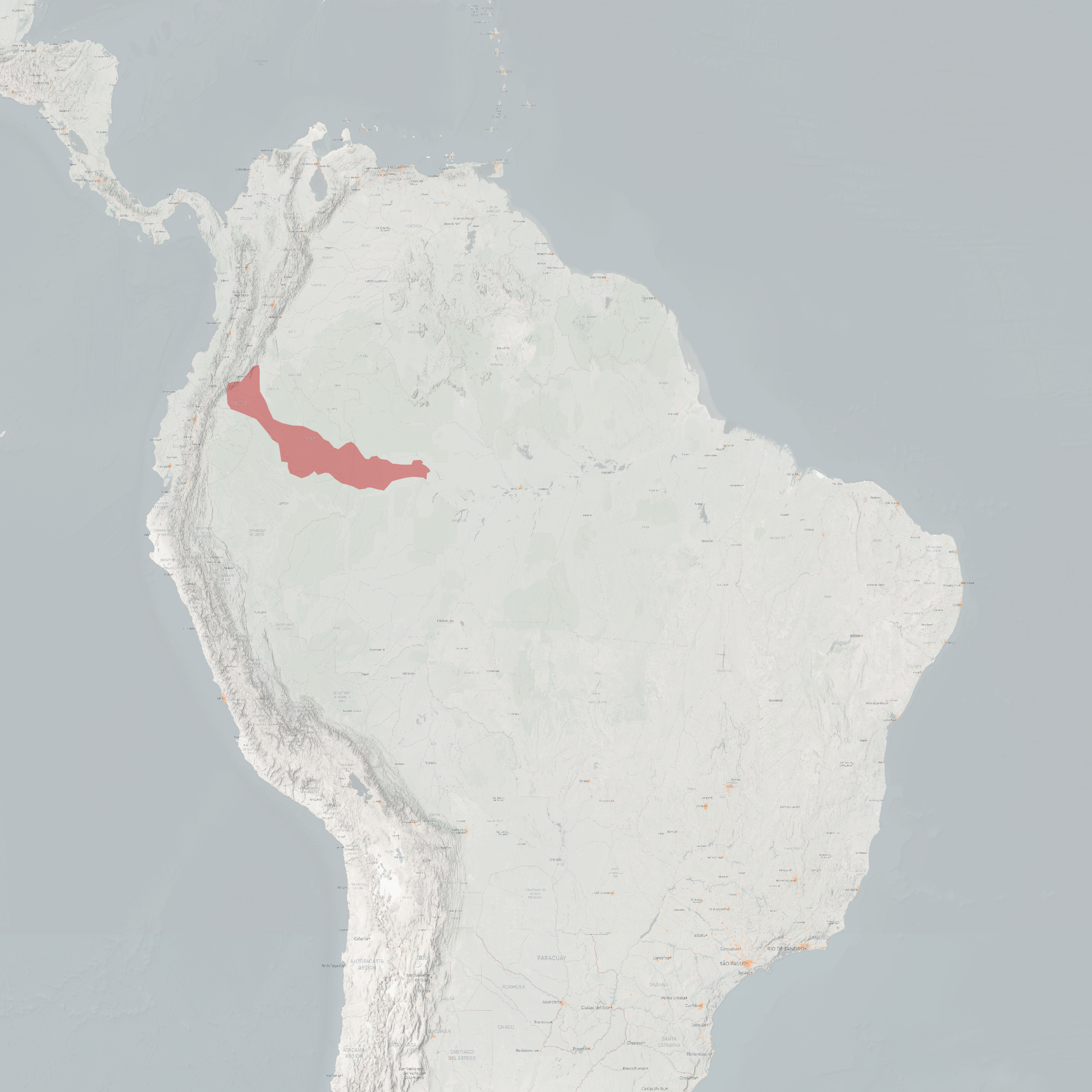
- Approximate range of the Lesson's Saddle-back Tamarin

= Lesson's saddle-back tamarin =

Species of tamarin

Lesson's saddle-back tamarin (Leontocebus fuscus) is a species of saddle-back tamarin, a type of small monkey from South America. Lesson's saddle-back tamarin was formerly considered to be a subspecies of the brown-mantled tamarin, L. fuscicollis. Genetic analysis showed it to be more closely related to the black-mantled tamarin than to the brown-mantled tamarin. Its type locality is in Colombia, in Plaines de Mocoa, Putumayo, between the Rio Putumayo and Rio Caqueta. It also lives in Brazil.

Lesson's saddle-back tamarin has a head and body length of between 212 millimetres (8.3 in) and 234 millimetres (9.2 in). Males have tails between 296 millimetres (11.7 in) and 383 millimetres (15.1 in) long, and females have tales between 337 millimetres (13.3 in) and 362 millimetres (14.3 in) long. It weighs between 350 grams (12 oz) and 400 grams (14 oz).

It sometimes associates with Goeldi's marmoset. The IUCN rates it as least concern from a conservation standpoint.
