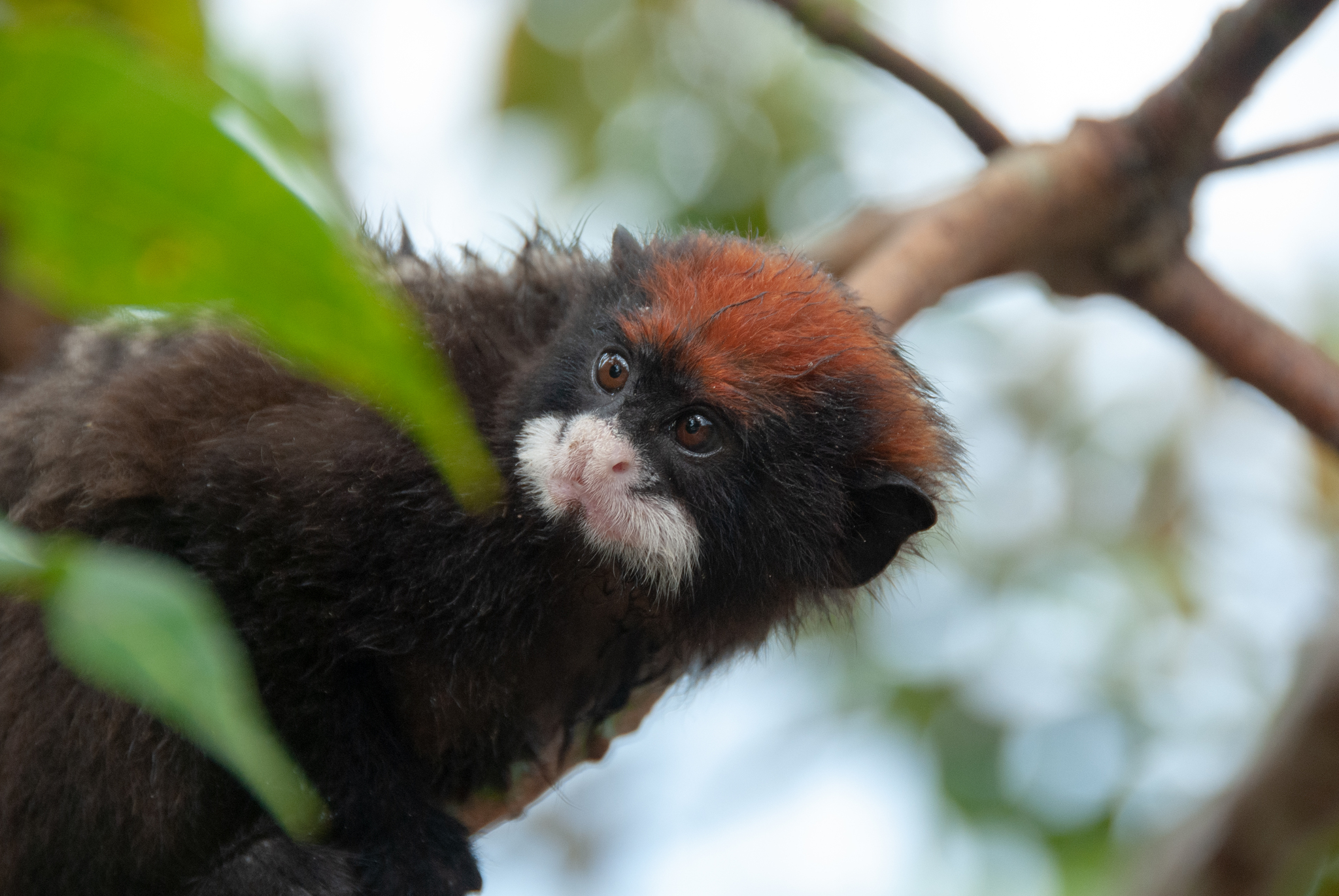

Conservation status
- Least Concern (IUCN 3.1)

Scientific classification
- Kingdom: Animalia
- Phylum: Chordata
- Class: Mammalia
- Infraclass: Placentalia
- Order: Primates
- Family: Callitrichidae
- Genus: Saguinus
- Species: S. mystax
- Subspecies: S. m. pileatus

Trinomial name
- Saguinus mystax pileatus I. Geoffroy & Deville, 1848

= Red-capped tamarin =

Species of mammal

The red-capped tamarin (Saguinus mystax pileatus), is subspecies of moustached tamarin from South America. They are found in Brazil, on the eastern margin of the Tefé and Coari rivers. Previously recognised as a separate species, Saguinus pilatus, the red-capped tamarin was demoted to subspecies status by a taxonomic review by Rylands et al., (2016).

== Description ==
Like all tamarins they are relatively small, growing up to 56 cm long. They have claws instead of nails and their fur is mainly black in color, as it is with feet, hands and tail. The hair is uniformly black, except for the one around the muzzle, being their "mustache", however, smaller than that of the moustached tamarins. The hair of the head, from the nape to the forehead, has reddish tones almost of a deep burgundy color, which have earned the species their common and scientific names.

== Distribution and habitat ==
Little is known about the habits of these primates. They are presumably similar to the moustached tamarins. They live in the western Amazon Basin in South America. Their distribution area is located in western Brazil, south of the Amazon River, in the eastern margin of the Tefe and Coari rivers. Their habitat is in rainforests densely covered with undergrowth. They are diurnal and arboreal, living together in small groups led by a dominant female. The females can mate promiscuously with all the males (polyandry), but were also seen cases of polygyny and monogamy. They mainly feed on fruits and insects, but occasionally they also eat eggs and small vertebrates.
