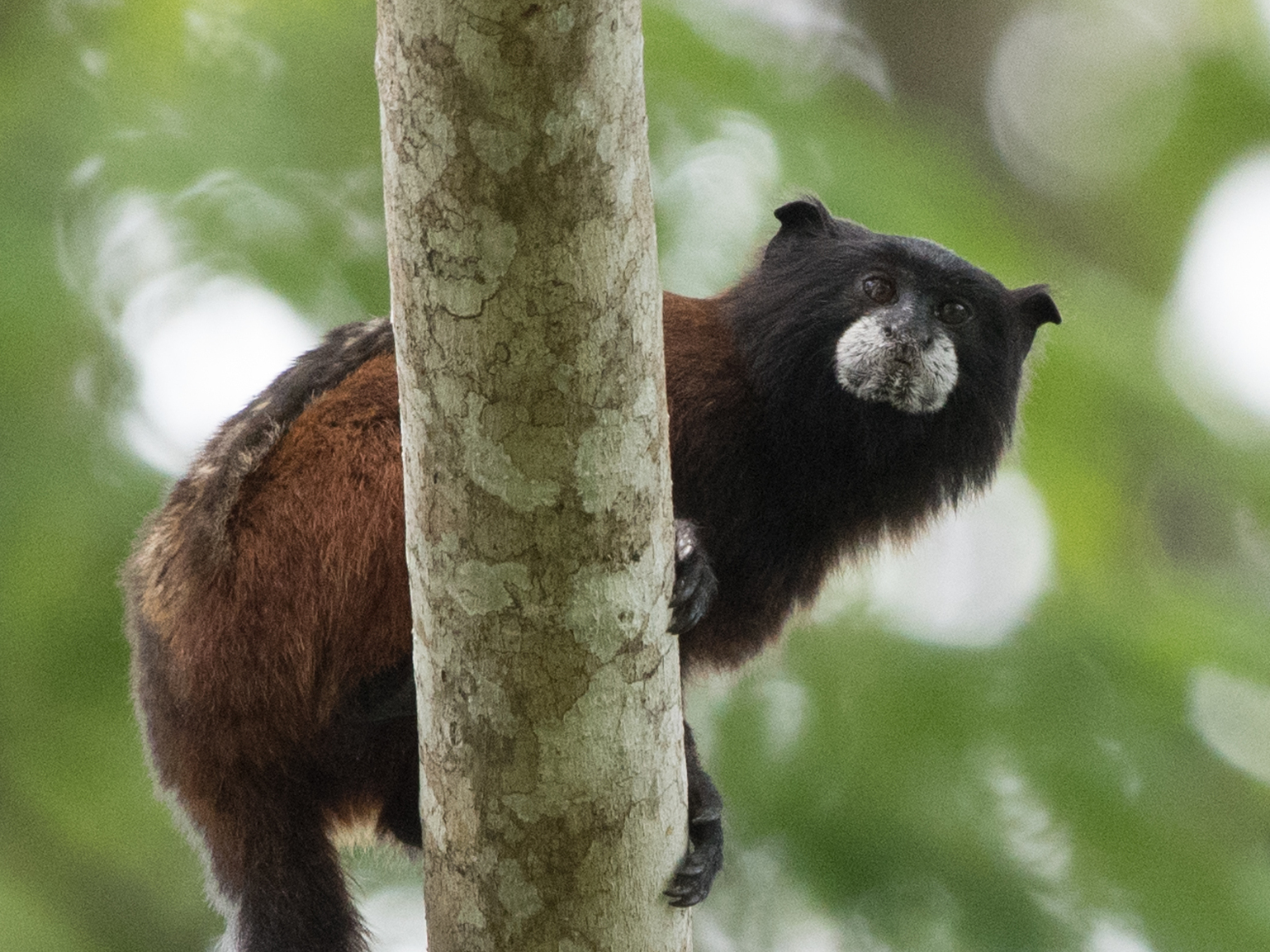

Conservation status
- Near Threatened (IUCN 3.1)

Scientific classification
- Kingdom: Animalia
- Phylum: Chordata
- Class: Mammalia
- Infraclass: Placentalia
- Order: Primates
- Family: Callitrichidae
- Genus: Leontocebus
- Species: L. illigeri

Binomial name
- Leontocebus illigeri (Pucheran, 1845)
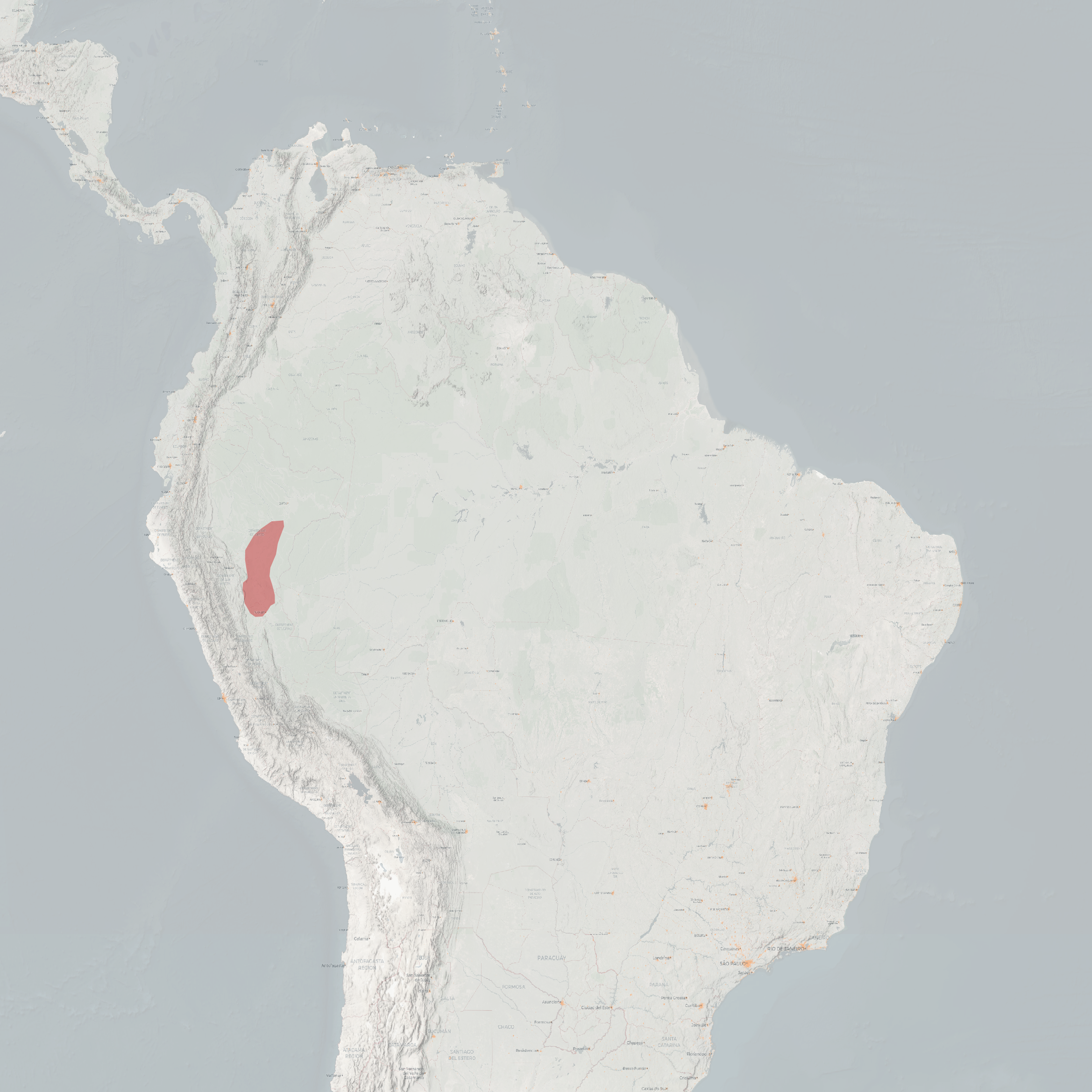
- Range of the Illiger's Saddle-back Tamarin

= Illiger's saddle-back tamarin =

Species of New World monkey

Illiger's saddle-back tamarin (Leontocebus illigeri) is a species of saddle-back tamarin, a type of small monkey from South America. Illiger's saddle-back tamarin was formerly considered to be a subspecies of the brown-mantled tamarin, L. fuscicollis. It is closely related to the Andean saddle-back tamarin. It is endemic to the Peruvian Amazon and its type locality is in Loreto, Peru, at the left bank of the lower Rio Ucayali.

Illiger's saddle-back tamarin has a head and body length of between 175 millimetres (6.9 in) and 205 millimetres (8.1 in) with a tail length between 300 millimetres (12 in) and 305 millimetres (12.0 in) long. Males weigh about 292 grams (10.3 oz) and females weight about 296 grams (10.4 oz).

The IUCN rates it as near threatened from a conservation standpoint.
