= Geoffroy's saddle-back tamarin =

Conservation status
- Least Concern (IUCN 3.1)

Scientific classification
- Kingdom: Animalia
- Phylum: Chordata
- Class: Mammalia
- Infraclass: Placentalia
- Order: Primates
- Family: Callitrichidae
- Genus: Leontocebus
- Species: L. nigrifrons

Binomial name
- Leontocebus nigrifrons (I. Geoffroy Saint-Hilaire, 1850)
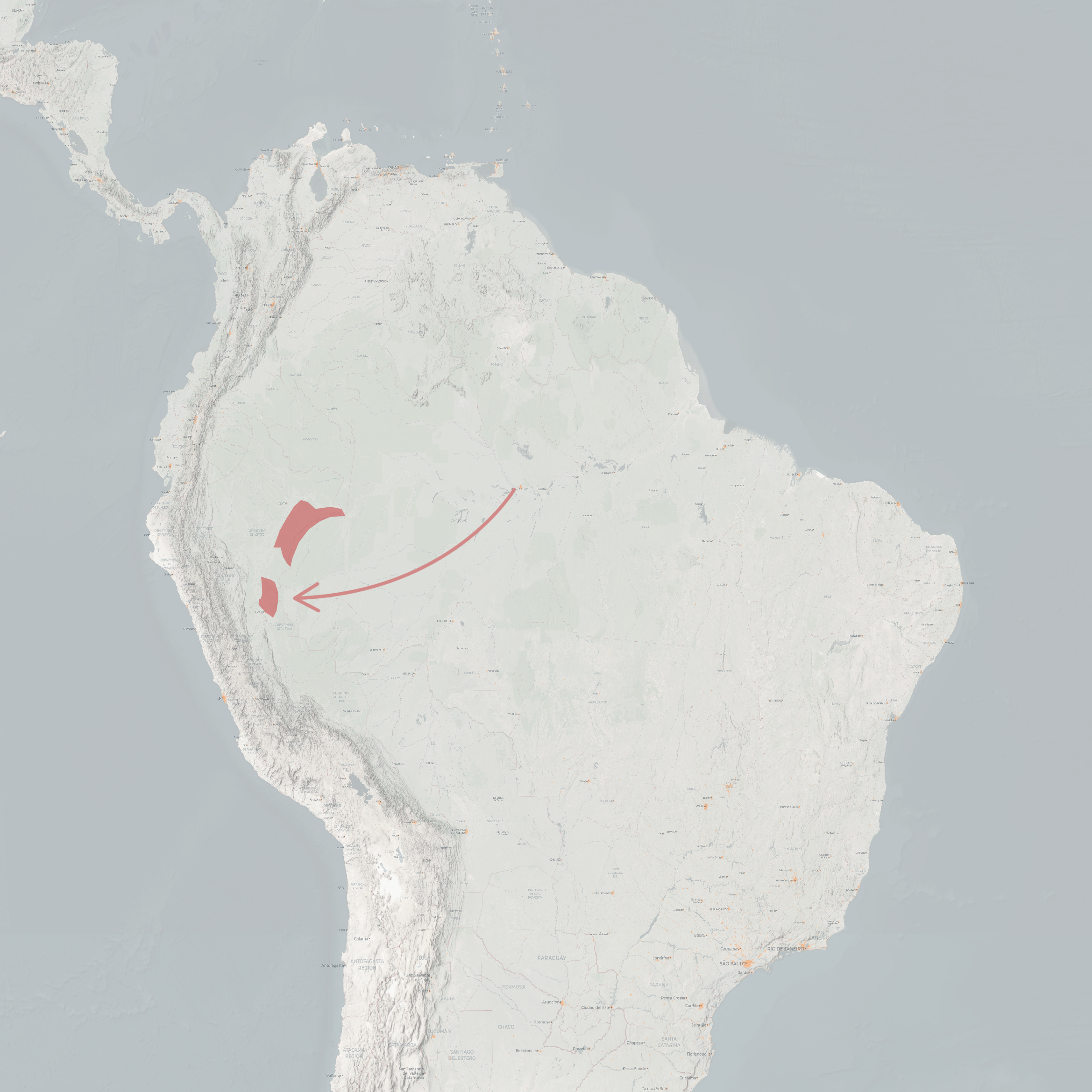
- Range of the Geoffroy's Saddle-back Tamarin

Species of New World monkey

Geoffroy's saddle-back tamarin (Leontocebus nigrifrons) is a species of saddle-back tamarin, a type of small monkey from South America. Geoffroy's saddle-back tamarin was formerly considered to be a subspecies of the brown-mantled tamarin, L. fuscicollis. It lives in Loreto, Peru.

Geoffroy's saddle-back tamarin has a head and body length of between 190 millimetres (7.5 in) and 219 millimetres (8.6 in) with a tail length between 305 millimetres (12.0 in) and 333 millimetres (13.1 in) long. Males weigh about 354 grams (12.5 oz) and females weight about 369 grams (13.0 oz).

It lives in groups with multiple males and females. It reaches sexual maturity at 18 months. Both males and females emigrate from their natal group. Geoffroy's saddle-back tamarin frequently associates with and forms mixed groups with moustached tamarins, Saguinus mystax. The two species often sleep in the same tree and both species respond to each other's alarm calls.

Its diet consists of fruits, gums, nectar, insects and other small animals.

The IUCN rates it as least concern from a conservation standpoint.

== Predation ==
Confirmed or suspected predators of Geoffroy’s saddle-back tamarins include emerald tree boas, Amazon tree boas, mussuranas, and bushmasters.
