= Mura's saddleback tamarin =

Scientific classification
- Kingdom: Animalia
- Phylum: Chordata
- Class: Mammalia
- Order: Primates
- Family: Callitrichidae
- Genus: Leontocebus
- Species: L. fuscicollis
- Subspecies: L. f. mura

Trinomial name
- Leontocebus fuscicollis mura Röhe, Silva Jr., Sampaio & Rylands, 2009

Subspecies of New World monkey

Mura's saddleback tamarin (Leontocebus fuscicollis mura) is a subspecies of monkey that was first seen by scientists in 2007 in the Brazilian state of Amazonas. The monkey, which is mostly gray and brown, weighs 213 grams (7.5 oz), is 240 millimetres (9.4 in) tall, and has a 320 millimetres (13 in) tail.

According to the discoverers of this new subspecies, Mura's saddleback tamarin is threatened by several planned development projects in the region, including a proposed gas pipeline, two hydroelectric dams currently in the beginning stages of construction, and, most notably, a major highway cutting through the Amazon that is currently being paved. Conservationists fear the highway could fuel wider deforestation in the Amazon over the next two decades.
