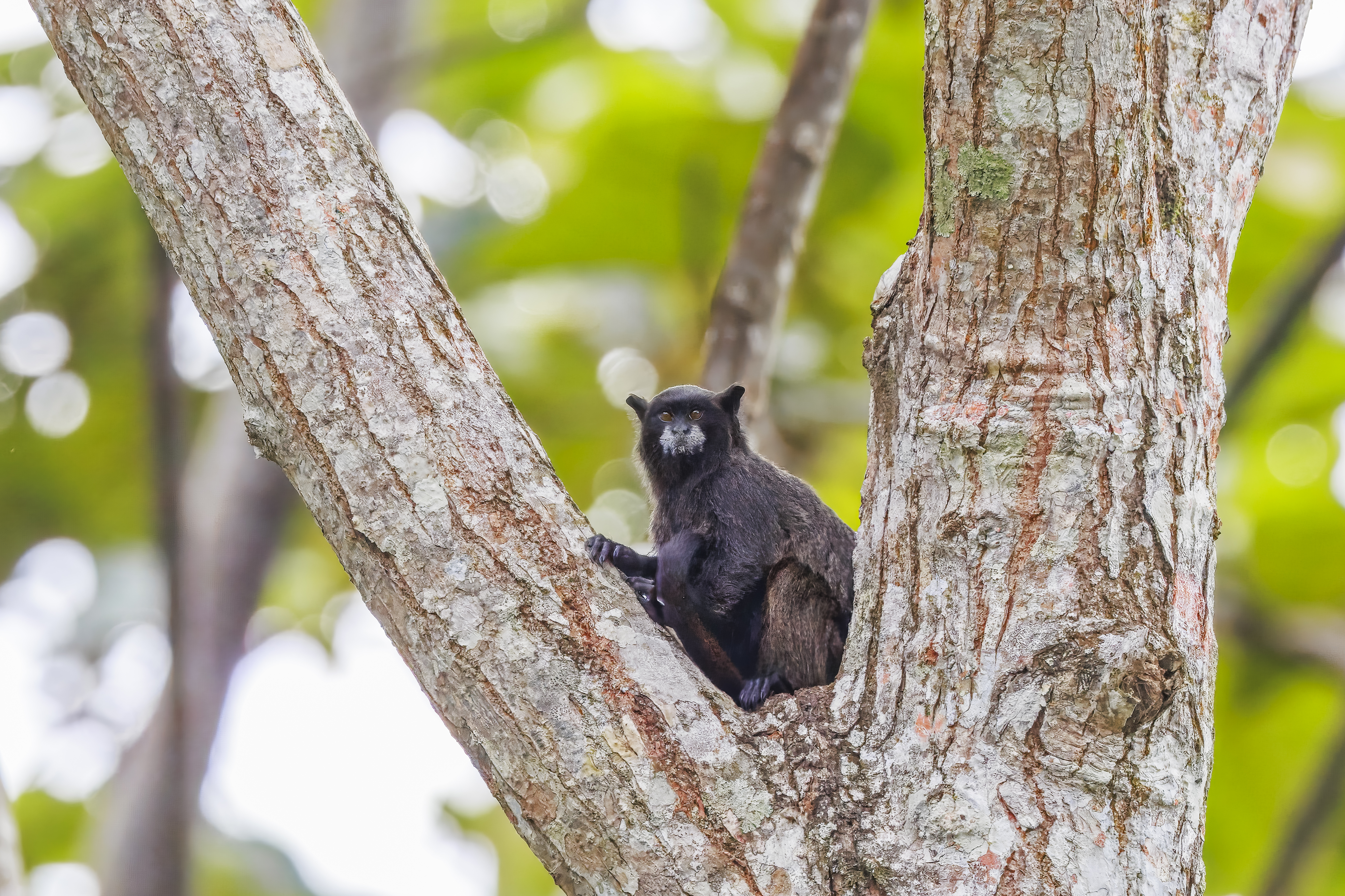
- Leontocebus nigricollis graellsi, Ecuador

Conservation status
- Near Threatened (IUCN 3.1)

Scientific classification
- Kingdom: Animalia
- Phylum: Chordata
- Class: Mammalia
- Order: Primates
- Family: Callitrichidae
- Genus: Leontocebus
- Species: L. nigricollis
- Subspecies: L. n. graellsi

Trinomial name
- Leontocebus nigricollis graellsi (Jimenez de la Espada, 1870)

= Graells's tamarin =

Subspecies of New World monkey

Graells's tamarin, Leontocebus nigricollis graellsi, is a subspecies of the black-mantled tamarin from the northwestern Amazon in southeastern Colombia, eastern Ecuador and northeastern Peru. It differs from other black-mantled tamarins in having a dull olive-brown (no reddish-orange) lower back, rump and thighs. However, molecular genetic analysis does not support treating Graell's tamarin as a separate species from the black-mantled tamarin.
