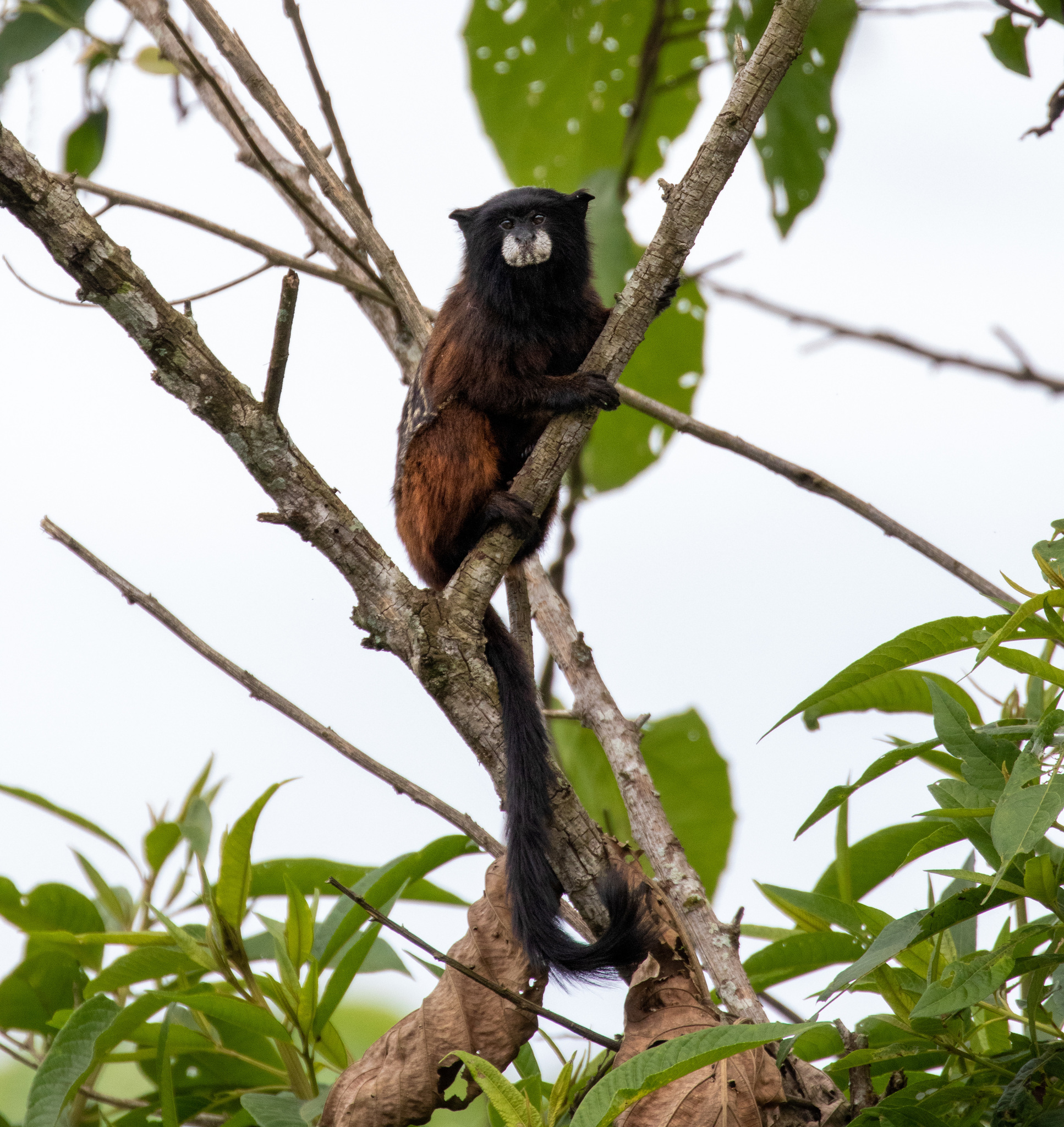

Conservation status
- Least Concern (IUCN 3.1)

Scientific classification
- Kingdom: Animalia
- Phylum: Chordata
- Class: Mammalia
- Infraclass: Placentalia
- Order: Primates
- Family: Callitrichidae
- Genus: Leontocebus
- Species: L. leucogenys

Binomial name
- Leontocebus leucogenys (J. E. Gray, 1866)
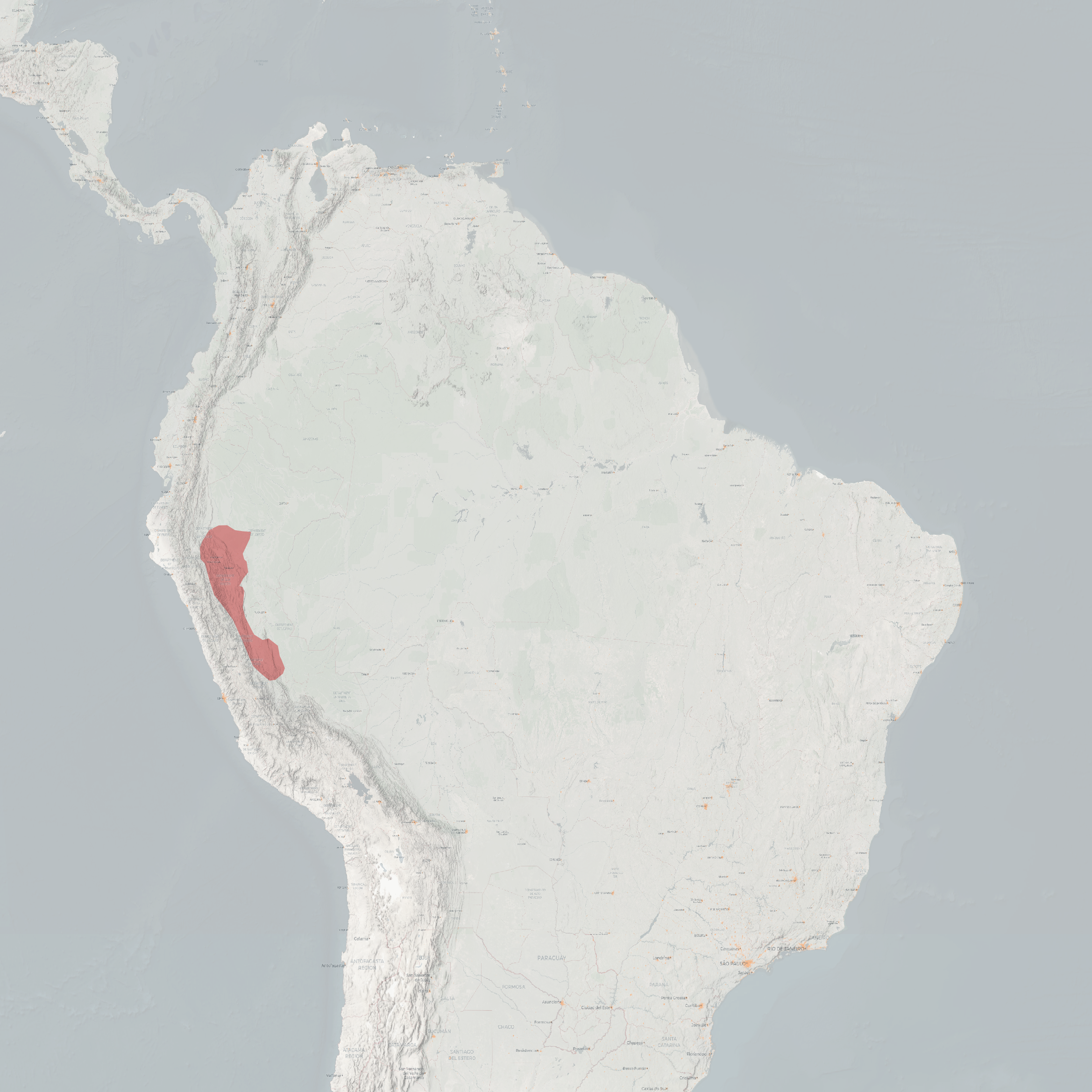
- Range of the Andean Saddle-back Tamarin

= Andean saddle-back tamarin =

Species of New World monkey

The Andean saddle-back tamarin (Leontocebus leucogenys) is a species of saddle-back tamarin, a type of small monkey from South America. The Andean saddle-back tamarin was formerly considered to be a subspecies of the brown-mantled tamarin, L. fuscicollis. It is closely related to Illiger's saddle-back tamarin. It is endemic to Peru and its type locality is in the Department of Huanuco, Peru.

The Andean saddle-back tamarin has a head and body length of between 205 millimetres (8.1 in) and 230 millimetres (9.1 in) with a tail length between 305 millimetres (12.0 in) and 330 millimetres (13 in) long. It weighs between 350 grams (12 oz) and 400 grams (14 oz).

The IUCN rates it as least concern from a conservation standpoint.
