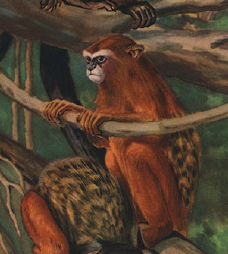
- Cruz Lima's saddle-back tamarin on middle right (crown and cheeks orangish-brown, not black)

Conservation status
- Least Concern (IUCN 3.1)

Scientific classification
- Kingdom: Animalia
- Phylum: Chordata
- Class: Mammalia
- Infraclass: Placentalia
- Order: Primates
- Family: Callitrichidae
- Genus: Leontocebus
- Species: L. cruzlimai

Binomial name
- Leontocebus cruzlimai (Hershkovitz, 1966)
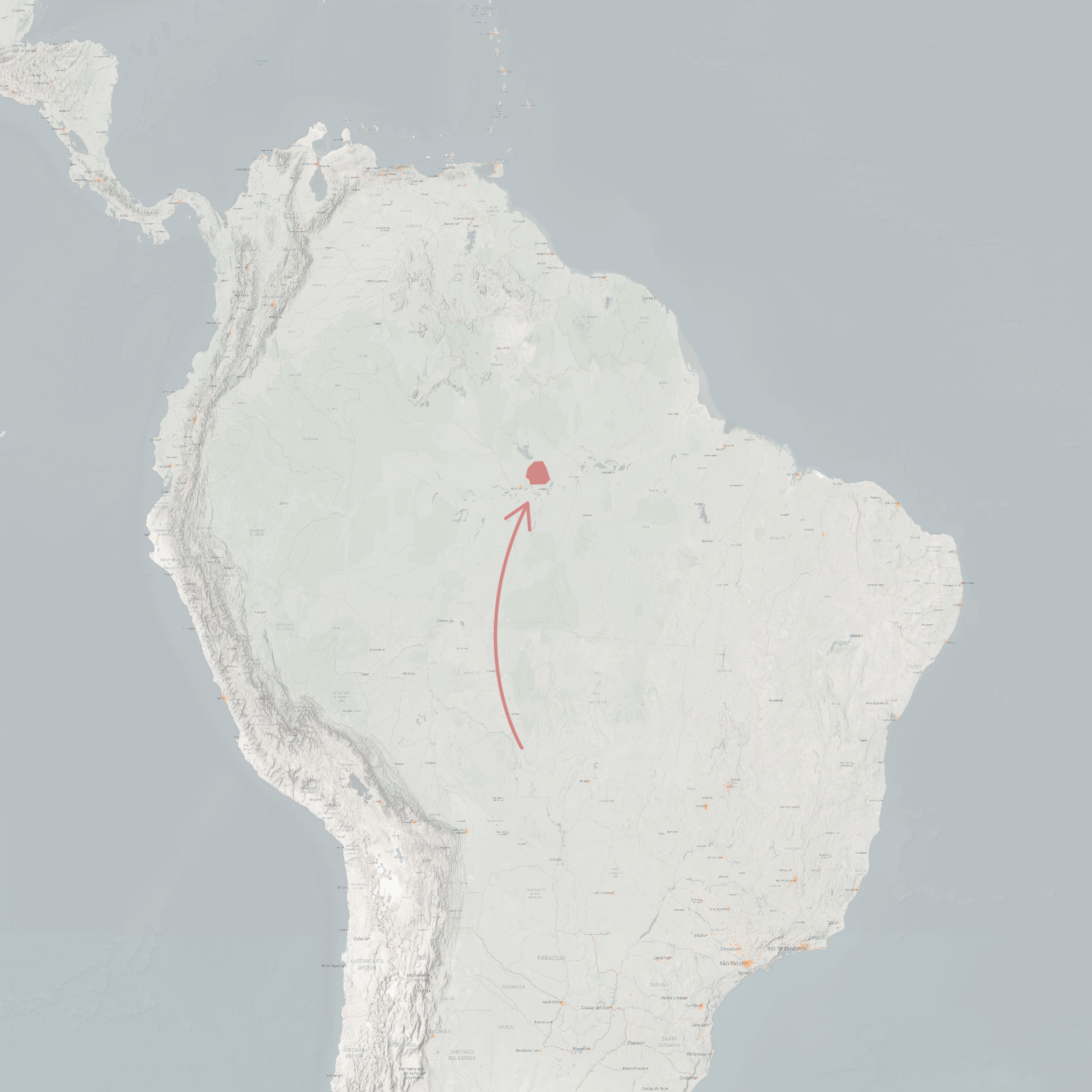
- The approximate range of the Cruz Lima's Saddle-back Tamarin

= Cruz Lima's saddle-back tamarin =

Species of New World monkey

Cruz Lima's saddle-back tamarin (Leontocebus cruzlimai) is a species of saddle-back tamarin, a type of small monkey from South America. Cruz Lima's saddle-back tamarin was formerly considered to be a subspecies of the brown-mantled tamarin, L. fuscicollis. It lives in Brazil in the area near the Inauini River. Its fur is mostly reddish orange, with a black tail and white eyebrows. The IUCN rates it as least concern from a conservation standpoint.
