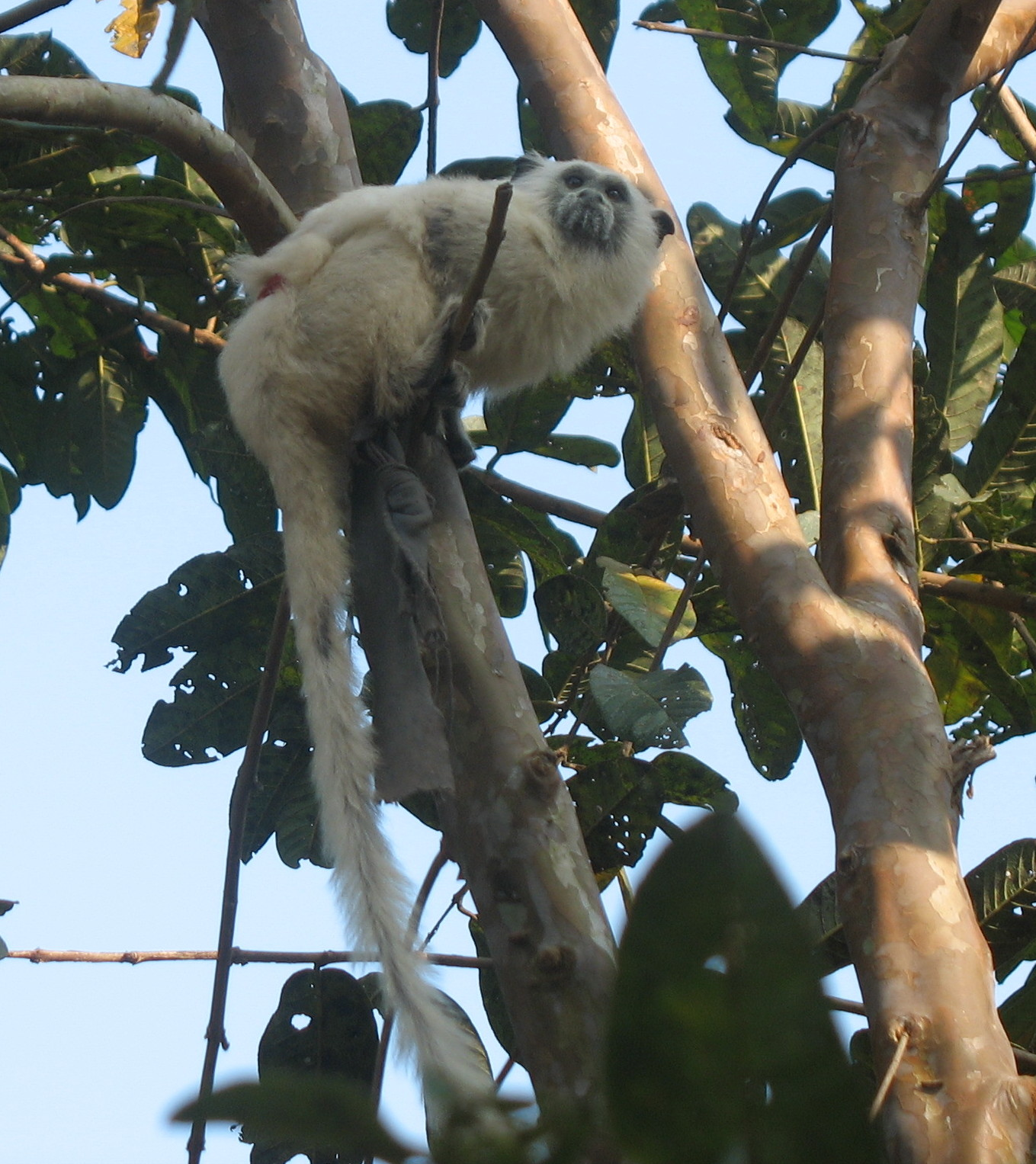

Conservation status
- Least Concern (IUCN 3.1)

Scientific classification
- Kingdom: Animalia
- Phylum: Chordata
- Class: Mammalia
- Order: Primates
- Family: Callitrichidae
- Genus: Leontocebus
- Species: L. weddelli
- Subspecies: L. w. melanoleucus

Trinomial name
- Leontocebus weddelli melanoleucus Ribeiro, 1912
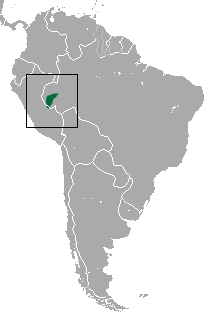
- White-mantled tamarin range

Synonyms
- acrensis (Carvalho, 1957); hololeucus (Pinto, 1937)

= White-mantled tamarin =

Subspecies of New World monkey

The white-mantled tamarin, Leontocebus weddelli melanoleucus, is a subspecies of Weddell's saddle-back tamarin, a tamarin monkey from South America. It is found in Brazil, between Rio Jurua and Rio Tarauacá.
