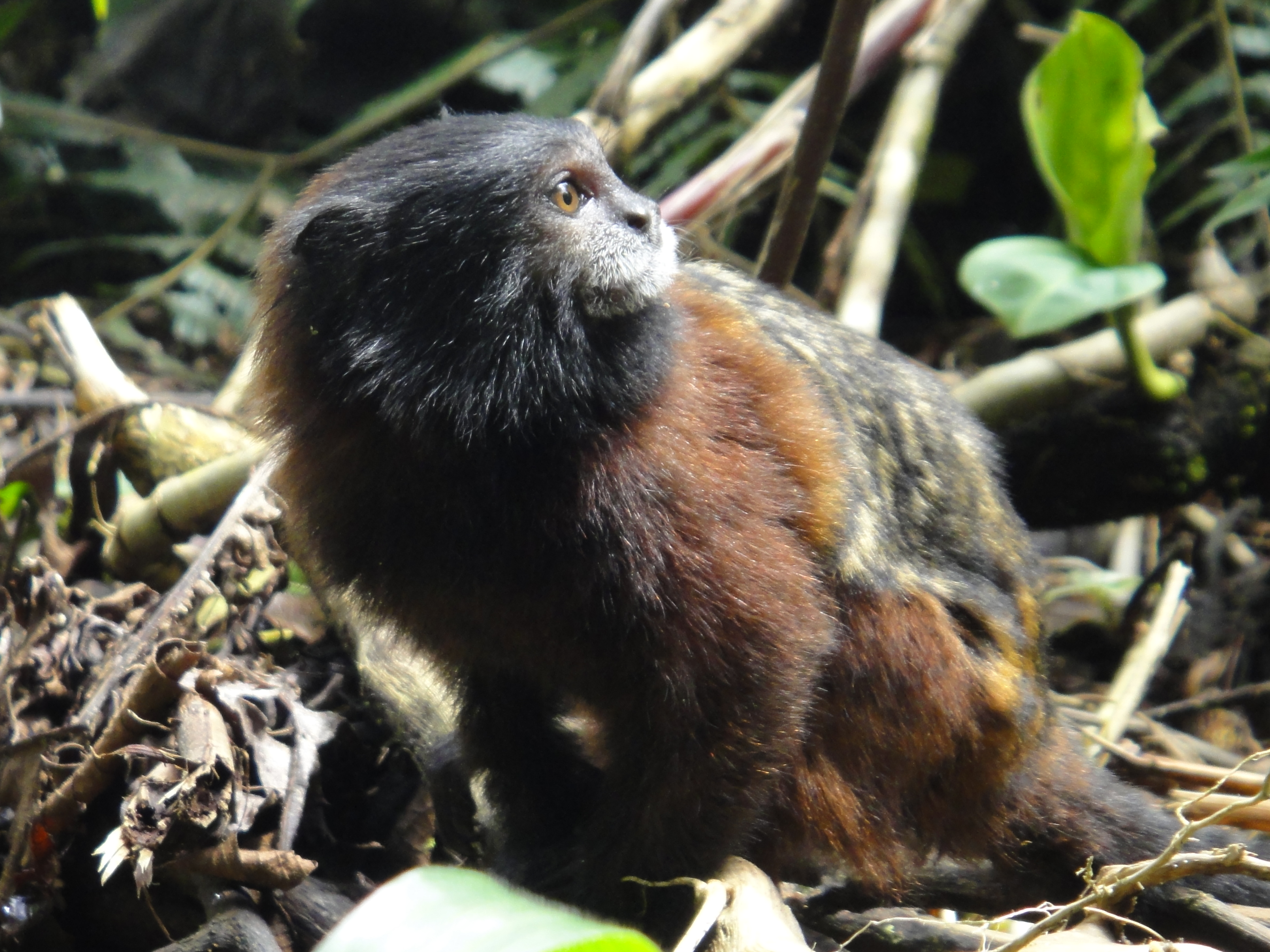

Conservation status
- Least Concern (IUCN 3.1)

Scientific classification
- Kingdom: Animalia
- Phylum: Chordata
- Class: Mammalia
- Infraclass: Placentalia
- Order: Primates
- Family: Callitrichidae
- Genus: Leontocebus
- Species: L. lagonotus

Binomial name
- Leontocebus lagonotus (Jiménez de la Espada, 1870)
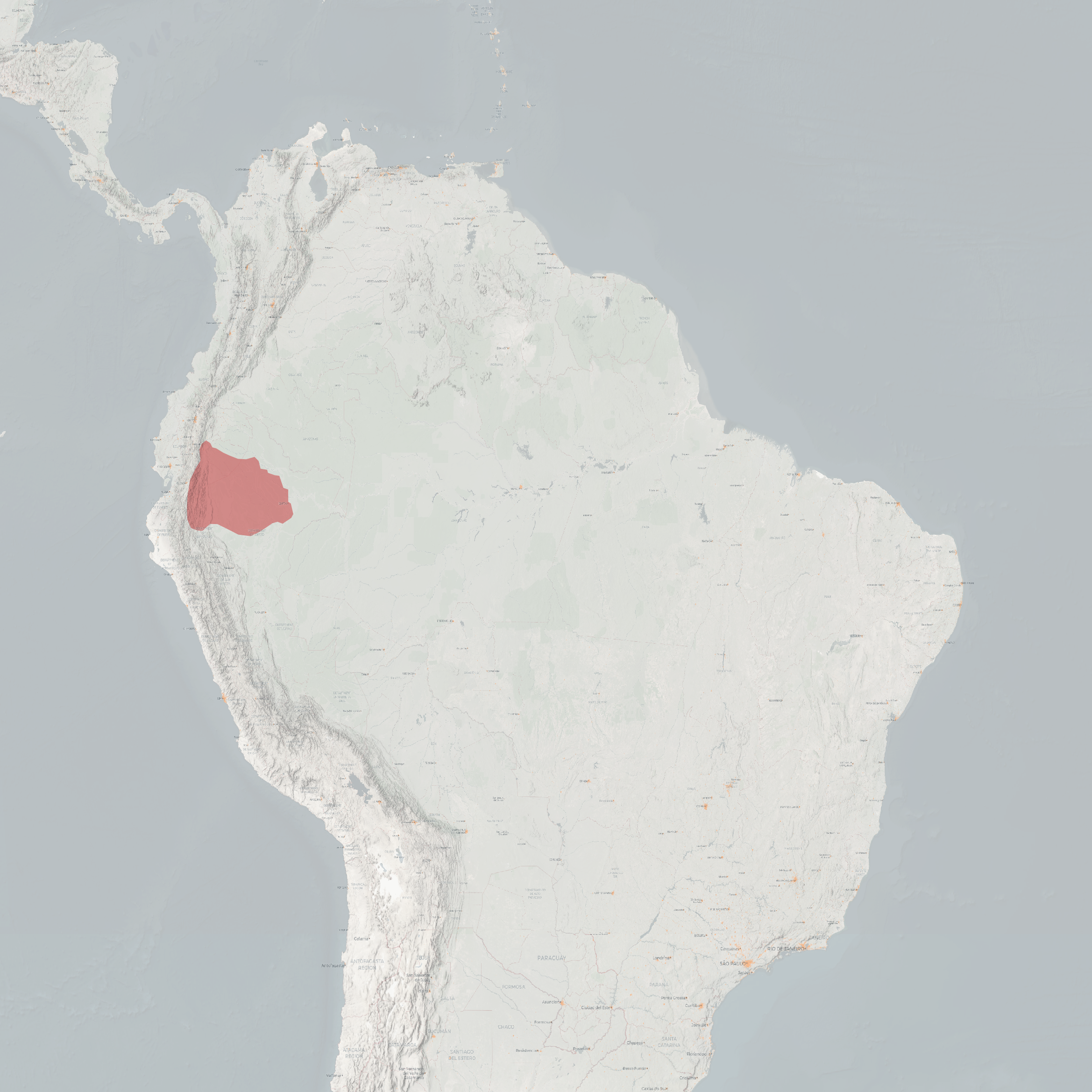
- Range of the Red-mantled Saddle-back Tamarin

Synonyms
- Leontocebus fuscicollis lagonotus (Jimenez de la Espada, 1870); Saguinus fuscicollis lagonotus (Jimenez de la Espada, 1870)

= Red-mantled saddle-back tamarin =

Species of New World monkey

The red-mantled saddle-back tamarin (Leontocebus lagonotus) is a species of saddle-back tamarin, a type of small monkey from South America. The red-mantled saddle-back tamarin was formerly considered to be a subspecies of the brown-mantled tamarin, L. fuscicollis. It lives in Ecuador and Peru and its type locality is in Peru, near the confluence of the Amazon River and the Napo River.

The red-mantled saddle-back tamarin has a head and body length of between 220 millimetres (8.7 in) and 270 millimetres (11 in) with a tail length between 275 millimetres (10.8 in) and 330 millimetres (13 in) long. It weighs between 350 grams (12 oz) and 400 grams (14 oz).

The IUCN rates it as least concern from a conservation standpoint.
