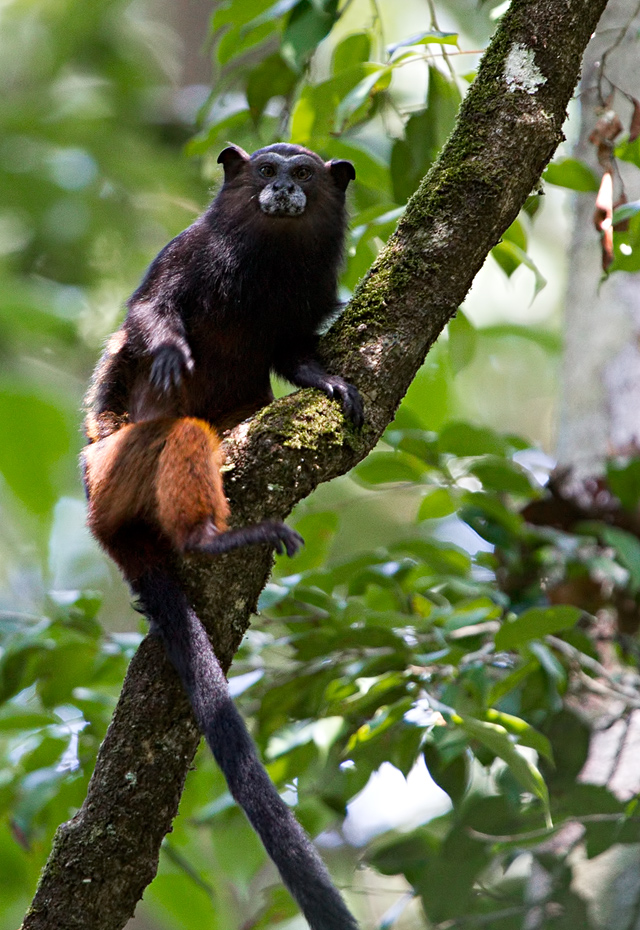
- Weddell's saddle-back tamarin

Conservation status
- Least Concern (IUCN 3.1)

Scientific classification
- Kingdom: Animalia
- Phylum: Chordata
- Class: Mammalia
- Infraclass: Placentalia
- Order: Primates
- Family: Callitrichidae
- Genus: Leontocebus
- Species: L. weddelli

Binomial name
- Leontocebus weddelli (Deville, 1849)
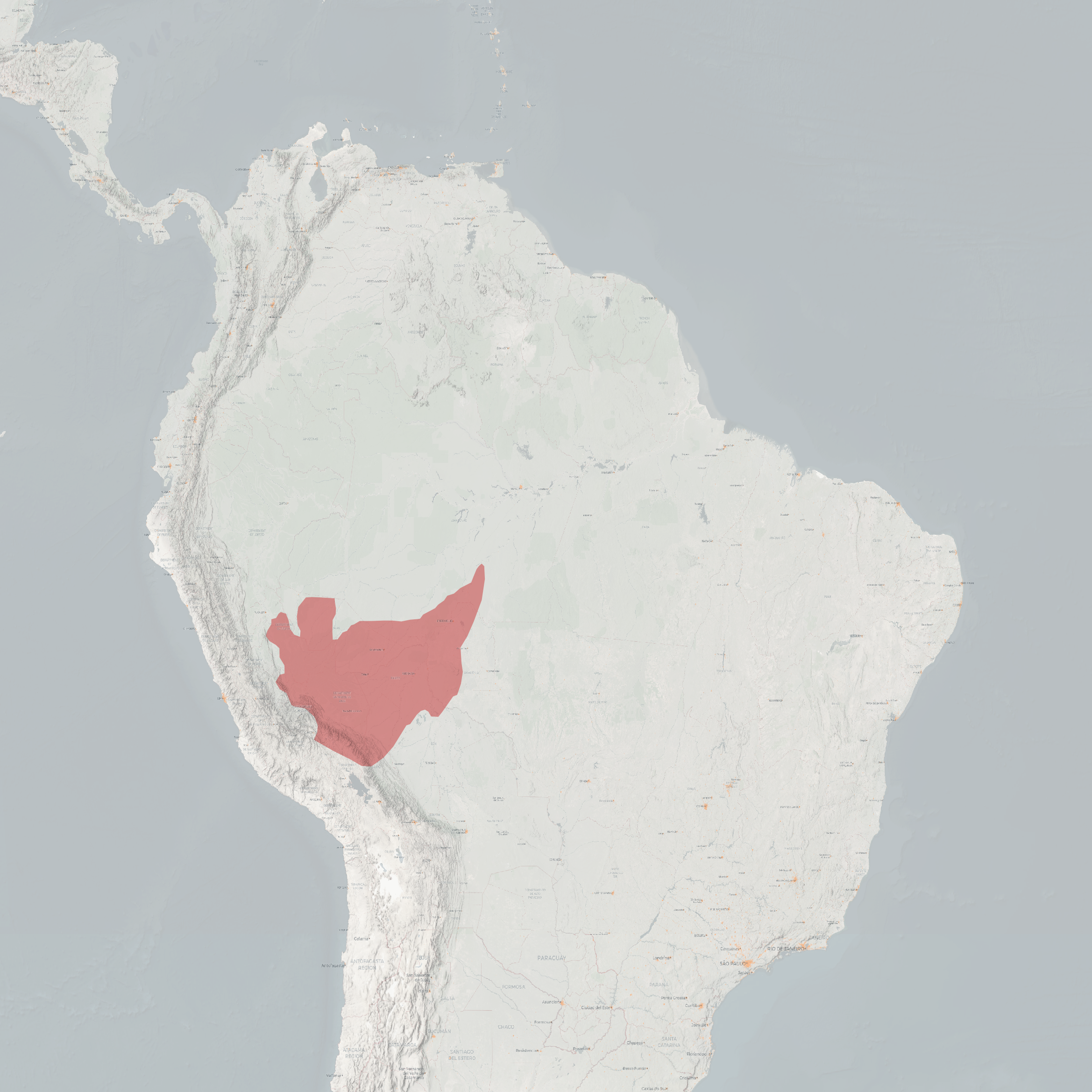
- Range of the Weddell's Saddle-back Tamarin

= Weddell's saddle-back tamarin =

Species of New World monkey

Weddell's saddle-back tamarin (Leontocebus weddelli) is a species of saddle-back tamarin, a type of small monkey from South America. Weddell's saddle-back tamarin was formerly considered to be a subspecies of the brown-mantled tamarin, L. fuscicollis. It lives in Brazil, Bolivia and Peru, with the type locality being in Bolivia.

There are 3 subspecies:

- Leontocebus weddelli weddelli
- Crandall's saddle-back tamarin, (Leontocebus weddelli crandalli)
- White-mantled tamarin or White saddle-back tamarin, (Leontocebus weddelli melanoleucus)

Males have a head and body length of about 190.0 millimetres (7.48 in) and females have a head and body length of about 196.6 millimetres (7.74 in). The tail is between 250 millimetres (9.8 in) and 300 millimetres (12 in) long. Males weigh about 359 grams (12.7 oz) and females weight about 357 grams (12.6 oz).

Its diet consists of fruits, gums, nectar, insects and other small animals. It lives in various types of groups, including single-adult male, single adult female groups, multi-male, multi-female groups, single-male, multi-female groups and single female, multi male groups. Females sometimes remain in their natal group. It associates with the emperor tamarin, the red-bellied tamarin and Goeldi's marmoset.

The IUCN rates it as least concern from a conservation standpoint.
