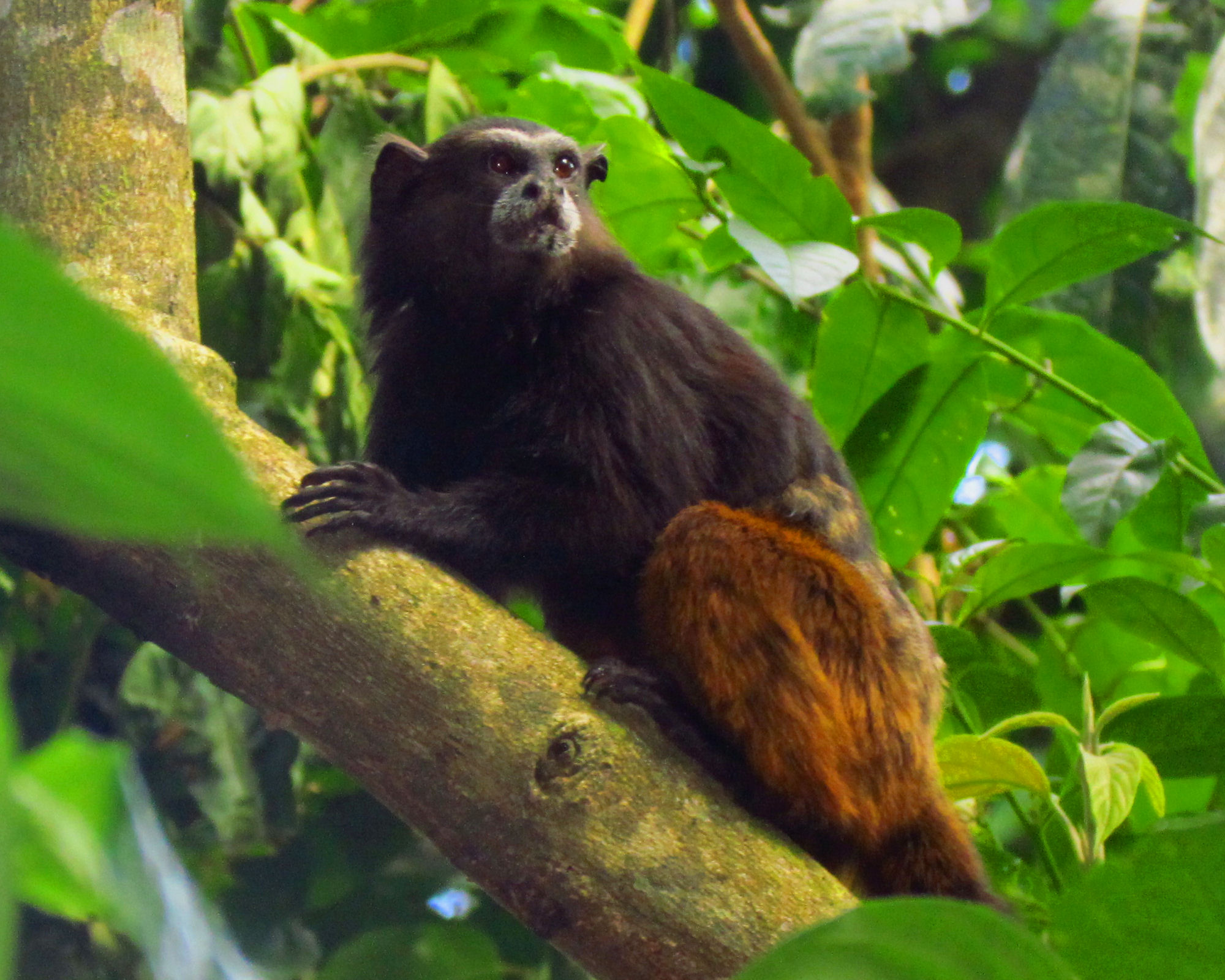
- Weddell's saddle-back tamarin

Scientific classification
- Kingdom: Animalia
- Phylum: Chordata
- Class: Mammalia
- Order: Primates
- Family: Callitrichidae
- Genus: Leontocebus; Wagner, 1840

Type species
- Leontocebus fuscus Lesson, 1840

Species
- 10 species, see text

= Saddle-back tamarin =

Saddle-back tamarins

Genus of New World monkeys

The saddle-back tamarins are squirrel-sized New World monkeys from the family Callitrichidae in the genus or subgenus Leontocebus. They were split from the tamarin genus Saguinus based on genetic data and on the fact that saddle-back tamarins are sympatric with members of Saguinus to a greater extent than would be expected from two members of the same genus. However, this argument can be circular, as several other mammals show sympatry among congeneric species, such as armadillos (genus Dasypus), spotted cats (genus Leopardus), and fruit-eating bats (genus Artibeus). Some authors still consider Leontocebus to be a subgenus of Saguinus.

Species include:

Genus Leontocebus – Wagner, 1840 – ten species
| Common name | Scientific name and subspecies | Range | Size and ecology | IUCN status and estimated population |
|---|---|---|---|---|
| Cruz Lima's saddle-back tamarin | Leontocebus cruzlimai (Hershkovitz, 1966) | Brazil | Size: Habitat: Area near the Inauini River Diet: | LC |
| Brown-mantled tamarin or Spix's saddle-back tamarin | Leontocebus fuscicollis (Spix, 1823) Four subspecies: L. f. avilapiresi, Avila Pires' saddle-back tamarin; L. f. fuscicollis, Spix's saddle-back tamarin; L. f. mura, Mura's saddleback tamarin; L. f. primitivus, Lako's saddleback tamarin | Bolivia, Brazil and Peru. | Size: Habitat: the Andes Mountains throughout the Amazon River Basin, they tend to inhabit primary and secondary lowland tropical forests. Diet: | LC |
| Lesson's saddle-back tamarin | Leontocebus fuscus (Pucheran, 1845) | Peru (Amazonas) | Size: Habitat: Diet: | NT |
| Illiger's saddle-back tamarin | Leontocebus illigeri (Lesson, 1840) | Colombia (Plaines de Mocoa, Putumayo, between the Rio Putumayo and Rio Caqueta), Brazil | Size: Habitat: Diet: | LC |
| Red-mantled saddle-back tamarin | Leontocebus lagonotus (Jiménez de la Espada, 1870) | Ecuador and Peru | Size: Habitat: Diet: | LC |
| Andean saddle-back tamarin | Leontocebus leucogenys (Gray, 1866) | Peru (Huanuco) | Size: Habitat: Diet: | LC |
| Black-mantled tamarin | Leontocebus nigricollis (Spix, 1823) Three subspecies: Spix's black mantle tamarin, Leontocebus nigricollis nigricollis; Graells's tamarin or Graells’ black-mantle tamarin, Leontocebus nigricollis graellsi; Hernandez-Camacho's black-mantle tamarin, Leontocebus nigricollis hernandezi | western Brazil, southeastern Colombia, north-eastern Peru and eastern Ecuador. | Size: Habitat: Diet: | LC |
| Geoffroy's saddle-back tamarin | Leontocebus nigrifrons (I. Geoffroy Saint-Hilaire, 1850) | Peru | Size: Habitat: Diet: | LC |
| Golden-mantled tamarin or Golden-mantled saddle-back tamarin | Leontocebus tripartitus (Milne-Edwards, 1878) | Ecuador and Peru(Amazon), Ecuador, and Northeast Peru (between the Rio Curaray and Rio Napo). | Size: Habitat: Diet: | NT |
| Weddell's saddle-back tamarin | Leontocebus weddelli (Deville, 1849) Three subspecies: Leontocebus weddelli weddelli; Crandall's saddle-back tamarin, (Leontocebus weddelli crandalli); White-mantled tamarin or White saddle-back tamarin, (Leontocebus weddelli melanoleucus) | Brazil, Bolivia and Peru | Size: Habitat: Diet: | LC |

In some locations saddle-back tamarins live sympatrically with tamarins of the genus Sanguinus, but the saddle-back tamarins typically occupy lower strata of the forest than do the Sanguinus species. Saddle-back tamarins have longer and narrower hands than Sanguinus species, possibly adaption to differing foraging behavior, as saddle-back tamarins are more likely to search for insects that are hidden in knotholes, crevices, bromeliad tanks and leaf litter, while Sanguinus species are more likely to forage for insects that are exposed on surfaces such as leaves or branches.
