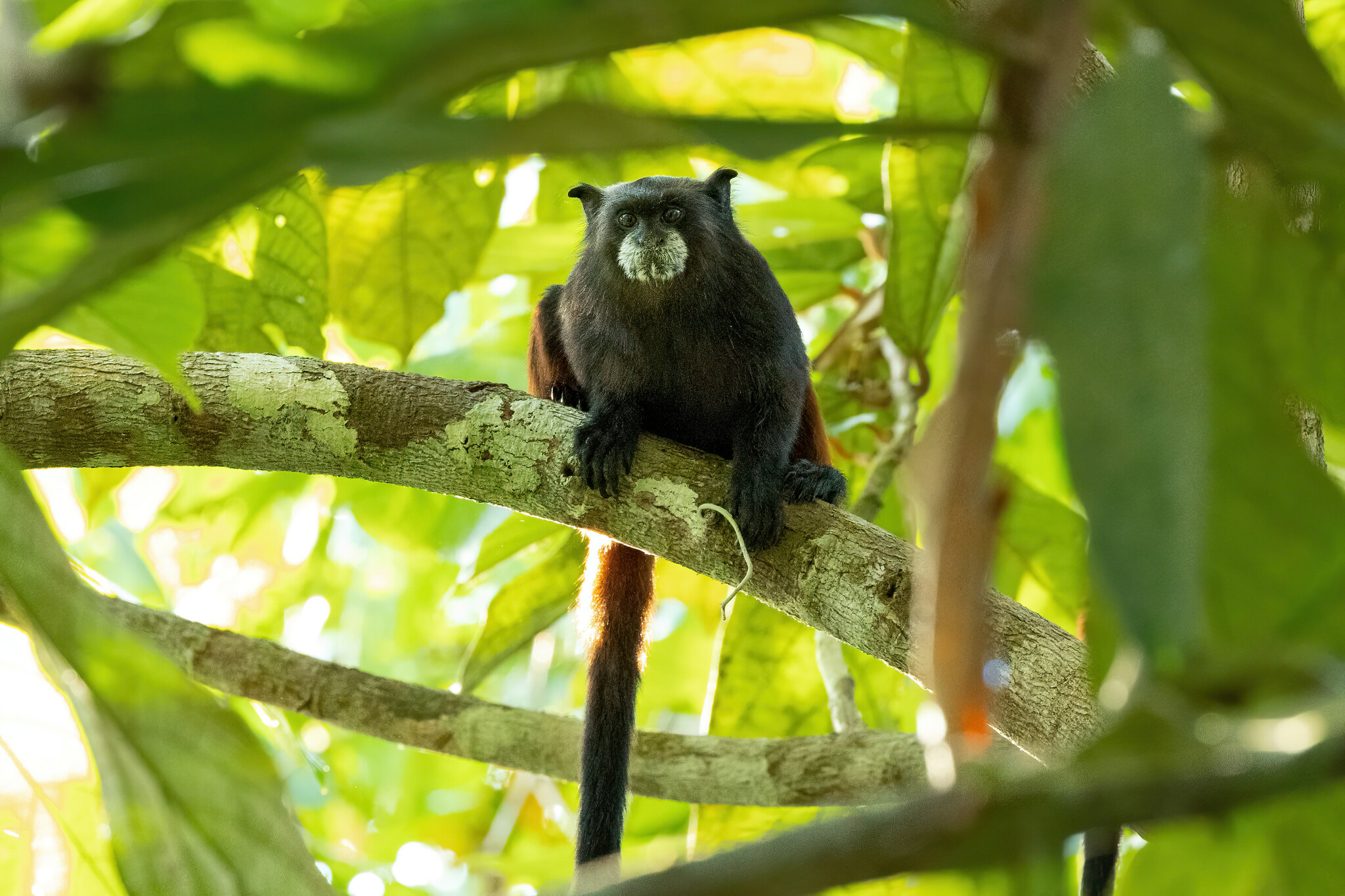

Conservation status
- Least Concern (IUCN 3.1)

Scientific classification
- Kingdom: Animalia
- Phylum: Chordata
- Class: Mammalia
- Infraclass: Placentalia
- Order: Primates
- Family: Callitrichidae
- Genus: Leontocebus
- Species: L. fuscicollis

Binomial name
- Leontocebus fuscicollis (Spix, 1823)
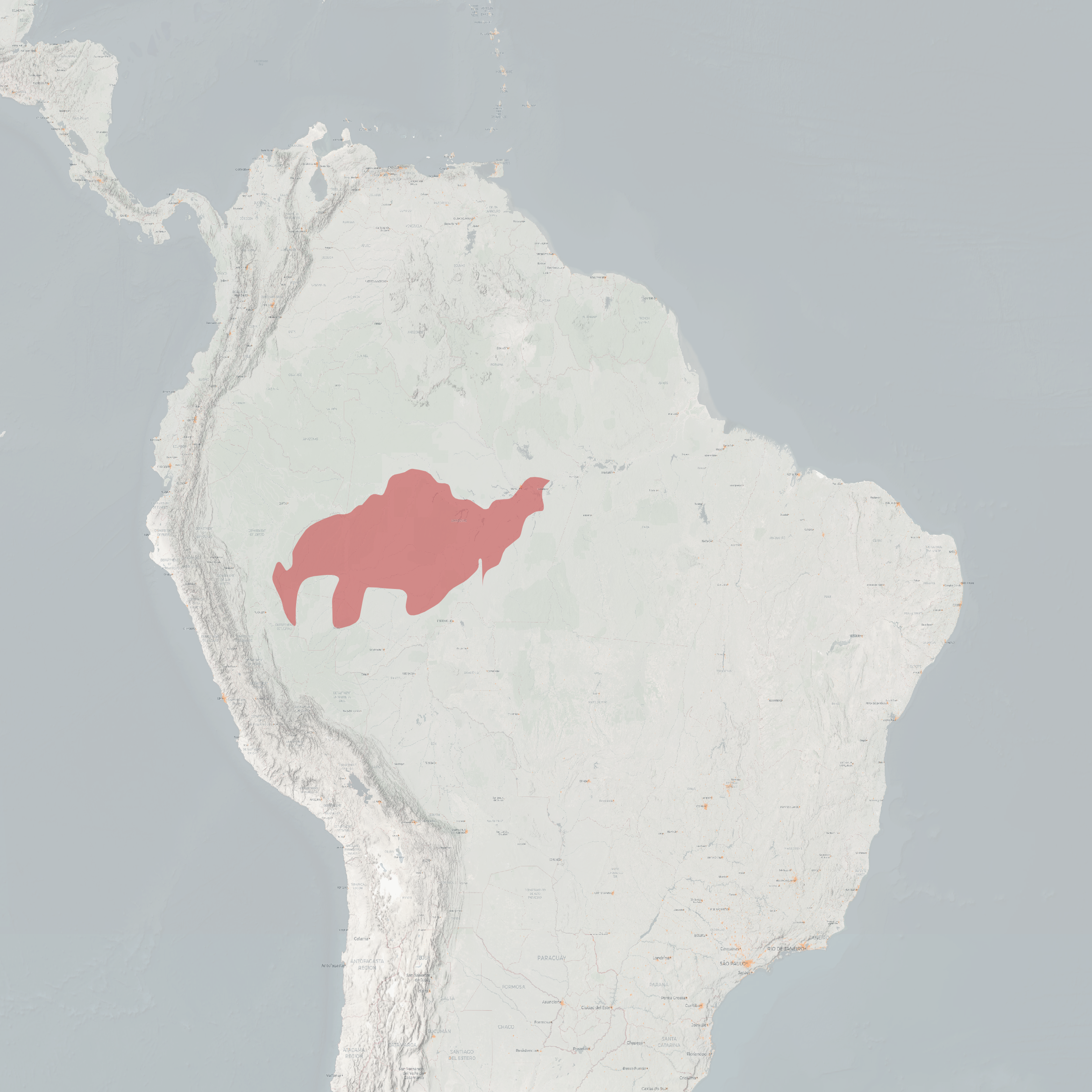
- Approiximate range of the Brown-mantled Tamarin

= Brown-mantled tamarin =

Species of New World monkey

The brown-mantled tamarin (Leontocebus fuscicollis), also known as Spix's saddle-back tamarin, is a species of saddle-back tamarin. This New World monkey is found in the Southern American countries of Bolivia, Brazil and Peru. This omnivorous member of the Callitrichidae family is usually found in smaller groups ranging between 4 and 15 individuals. This species communicates vocally and largely relies on its olfactory system. The brown-mantled tamarin is considered a species of Least Concern by the International Union for Conservation of Nature, despite a decreasing population and being threatened by poaching, habitat loss and capture for the illegal pet trade.

== Taxonomy ==
There are 4 subspecies:

- L. f. avilapiresi, Avila Pires' saddle-back tamarin
- L. f. fuscicollis, Spix's saddle-back tamarin
- L. f. mura, Mura's saddleback tamarin
- L. f. primitivus, Lako's saddleback tamarin

Cruz Lima's saddle-back tamarin, Lesson's saddle-back tamarin, Illiger's saddle-back tamarin, the red-mantled saddle-back tamarin, the Andean saddle-back tamarin, Geoffroy's saddle-back tamarin and Weddell's saddle-back tamarin were all formerly considered subspecies of the brown-mantled tamarin.

== Habitat ==
Brown-mantled tamarins occupy an extensive area of northern Amazonia.

The brown-mantled tamarin is found in South America, with a geographic range from Brazil, Peru, and Bolivia. This primate species is found predominantly in the Andes Mountains throughout the Amazon River Basin; they tend to inhabit primary and secondary lowland tropical forests. The brown-mantled tamarin typically remains at a lower altitude in the canopy than other species of primates.

The brown-mantled tamarin is sympatric with the pygmy marmoset, sharing the same habitat in South American countries, and will often raid the gum holes of this species. It is sometimes associated with the red-bellied tamarin.

== Characteristics ==
The brown-mantled tamarin has an average height between 8.1–9.1 in (210–230 mm) and an average body weight between 348–456 g (12.3–16.1 oz). Sexual dimorphism is not pronounced in this species. Both females and males have long non-prehensile tails between 5–12 in (130–300 mm) long. Brown mantled tamarins usually have a lifetime between 8 and 13 years, but some have been reported to live up to 25 years in captivity. They typically have orange-yellow fur with black patches and narrow hands, which helps this small-statured primate reach into small crevices when foraging. This species is diurnal and arboreal, meaning they spend most of their time within the trees and are most active throughout the day.

== Diet ==
This species eats plant and animal matter, feeding on fruits, flowers, nectar, eggs, and smaller animals, including snails, lizards, tree frogs and insects. The brown-mantled tamarin specifically enjoys tree sap in the late dry season and early wet season. To access the plant exudates, they utilize pre-existing holes made by other primates, primarily the pygmy marmoset, rather than creating a hole themselves.

== Behavior ==
=== Social behavior ===
Brown-mantled tamarin social groups average 8 individuals and sleep in low-lying palms of the Oenocarpus bataua tree and tree hollows, relying on concealment as a strategy of predator protection. Their territory may occasionally overlap with other species of callitrichids, including the pygmy marmoset, Goeldi's marmoset, and moustached tamarin. It is common for this species to defend its territory; however, not all intergroup encounters are aggressive.

=== Vocalization ===
Similar to other species of callitrichids, the brown-mantled tamarin utilizes vocalization to communicate with each other; they have many different forms of vocalizations, including a soft trill contact call, a long-distance loud whistle and an alarm call, which all convey a different message; these calls can sound like chirps or whistles. They do not, however, use their vocalization skill as their main form of communication. The brown-mantled tamarin will sound alarm calls when in proximity of potential danger from intruders or predators; individuals will respond to the alarm calls, which aids in determining the location of each group member.

Due to the brown-mantled tamarin's geographic distribution, its territory often overlaps with that of other primate species. It is not uncommon for different species, such as the moustached tamarin, to respond to its calls, even though every species has different-sounding alarm calls.

=== Olfactory communication ===
This species possesses a well-developed olfactory communication system with specialized glands in the anogenital, suprapubic, and sternal regions; they can perceive information about species, subspecies, sex, and individual identity in the sender's scent marks, as well as females relaying the status of their reproductive condition through their scents. Olfactory communication is substantially different from other forms of communication; scent marks are deposited in the substrate and can be detected long after they were deposited. There are three functional motives for scent marking behavior amongst New World primates: territorial function, regulation of social and reproductive dominance and mate attraction.

The use of scent marking for territorial defense was hypothesized to be one of the main functions within brown-mantled tamarins, as they typically would mark more on the periphery of their area of territory, however spatial patterns of scent marking failed to reveal a consistent pattern and that there is no difference in the pattern of scent marking between exclusive and overlap areas, rather that the distribution of scent-marking was correlated with the intensity of home-range use. Although scent marking may not be primarily a mechanism for defending their territory, it does serve a purpose to neighboring groups and intruders, as the territory of brown-mantled tamarins overlaps the territory of many other primates, scent marking is a strategy used to communicate with other groups to reduce aggressive intergroup encounters.

A secondary use of olfactory communication can be found for reproductive functions, where females will release certain pheromones within their territory to convey their reproductive status to find a mating partner or to prevent other females within the group from breeding. It has been found that males within the group may deposit their own scent mark over the secretions of females as a strategy to claim the female as their copulation partner. Generally, these glandular secretions will be deposited on branches or trees, but can occasionally be deposited on other primates, known as allomarking.

=== Breeding ===
Groups of brown-mantled tamarins typically involve two or more adult males and a single reproductive female. It is common within this species that the dominant female births twins, which are cared for by all group members. Polyandry is more common within groups of brown-mantled tamarins because of the high frequency of twin births, making it difficult for the mother to take care of her offspring at once. As a result, alloparenting highly prevails where nonreproductive helpers and polyandrous males aid with infant care. The breeding male typically carries the infants until they are 90 days old, passing them back to their mother only for feeding. The gestation period for this species is roughly 150 days, and babies are not fully weaned from their mothers until 3–4 months and reach maturity at the age of 2.

== Conservation status ==
The International Union for Conservation of Nature (IUCN) lists the brown mantled tamarin as a Least-concern species. Still, it is slowly becoming in danger of extinction through the destruction of habitat for logging or clearing of land for farming, poaching and being captured for the illegal pet trade.
