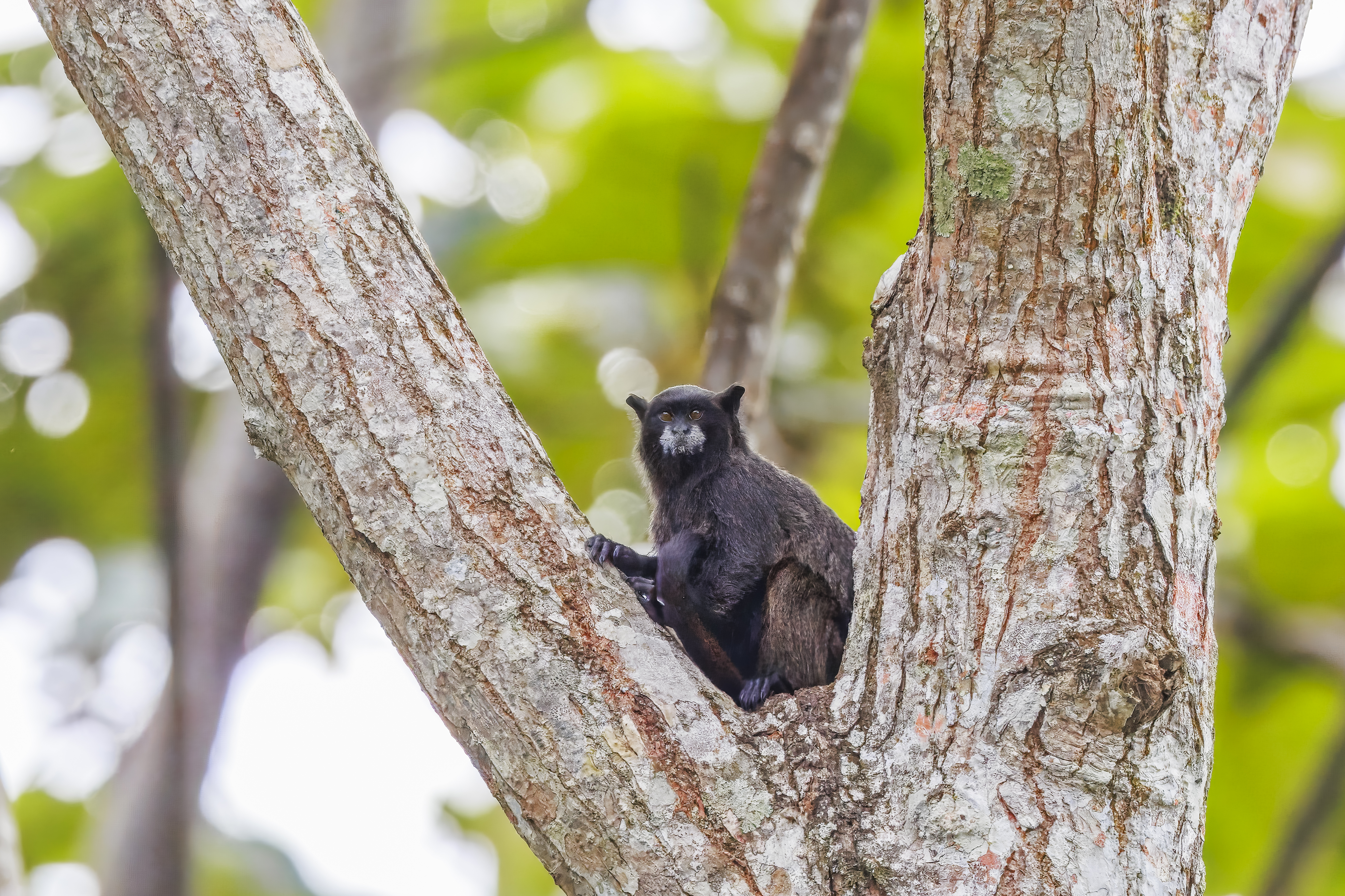
- Leontocebus nigricollis graellsi, Ecuador

Conservation status
- Least Concern (IUCN 3.1)

Scientific classification
- Kingdom: Animalia
- Phylum: Chordata
- Class: Mammalia
- Infraclass: Placentalia
- Order: Primates
- Family: Callitrichidae
- Genus: Leontocebus
- Species: L. nigricollis

Binomial name
- Leontocebus nigricollis (Spix, 1823)
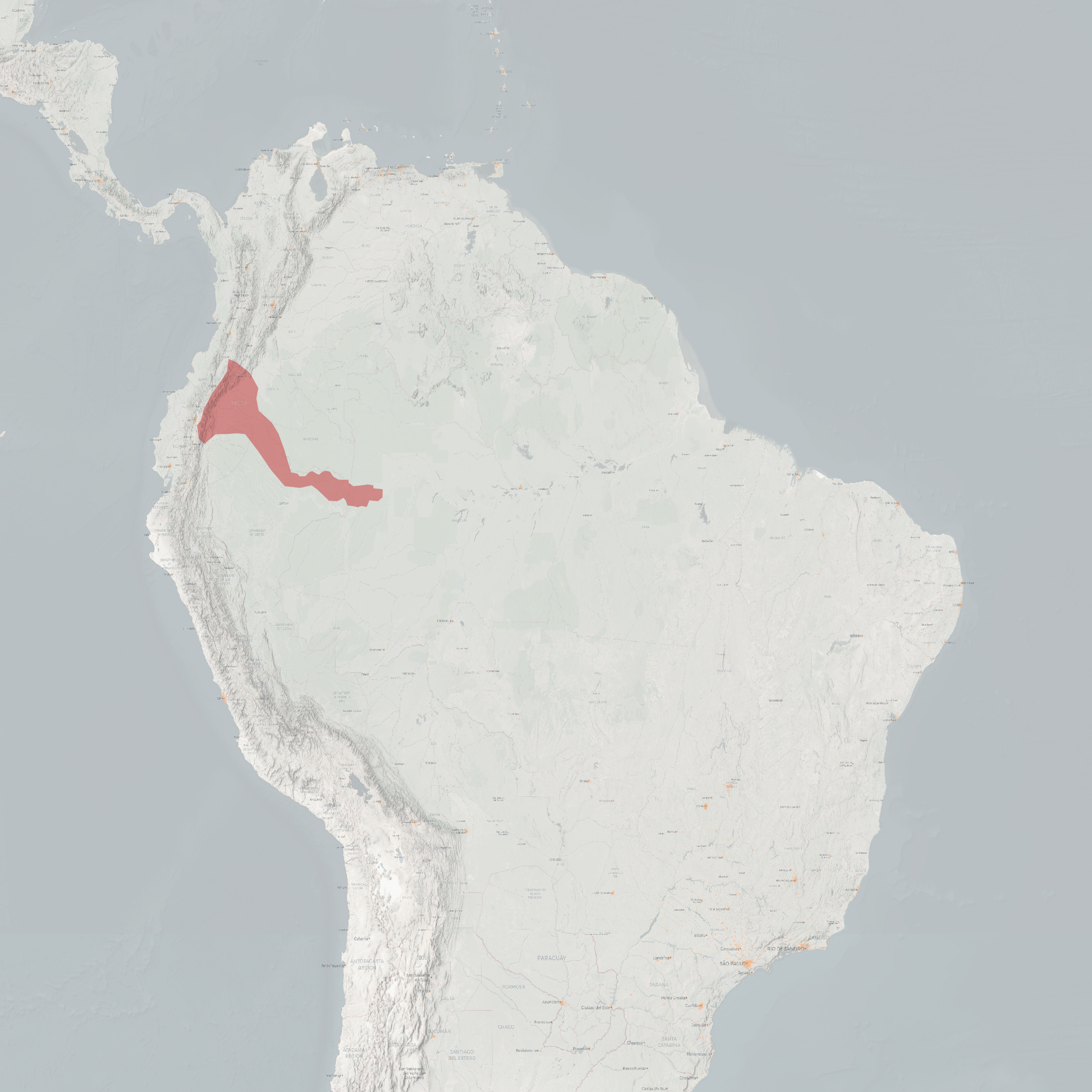
- Range of the Black-mantled Tamarin

= Black-mantled tamarin =

Species of New World monkey

The black-mantled tamarin, Leontocebus nigricollis, is a species of saddle-back tamarin from the northwestern Amazon in far western Brazil, southeastern Colombia, north-eastern Peru and eastern Ecuador.

There are 3 subspecies:

- Spix's black mantle tamarin, Leontocebus nigricollis nigricollis
- Graells's tamarin or Graells' black-mantle tamarin, Leontocebus nigricollis graellsi
- Hernandez-Camacho's black-mantle tamarin, Leontocebus nigricollis hernandezi

Graells's tamarin was previously considered to be a separate species.

== Predation ==
Predators of black-mantled tamarins include barred forest falcons.
