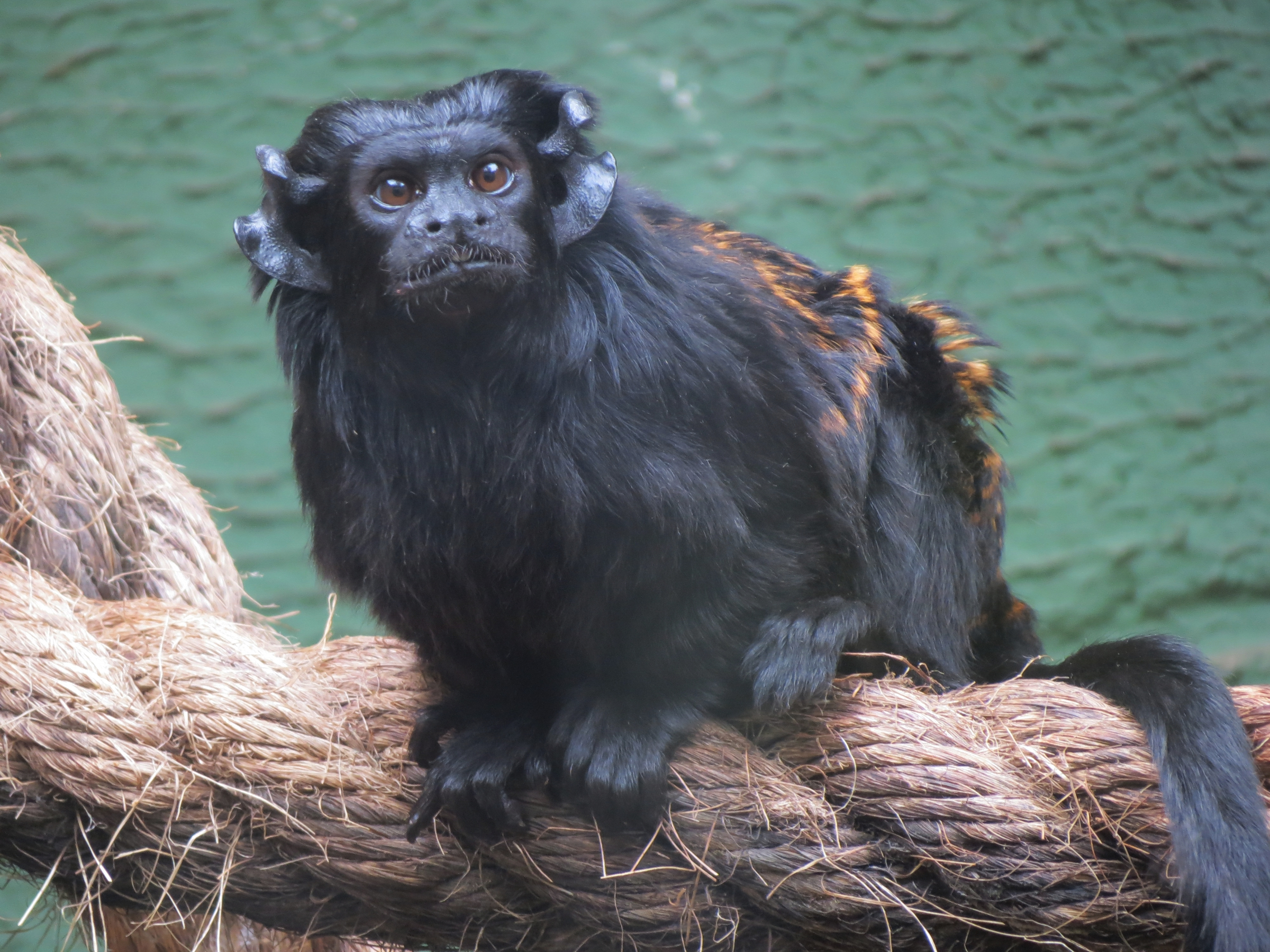
- At Sorocaba Zoo, Brazil

Conservation status
- Vulnerable (IUCN 3.1)

Scientific classification
- Kingdom: Animalia
- Phylum: Chordata
- Class: Mammalia
- Infraclass: Placentalia
- Order: Primates
- Family: Callitrichidae
- Genus: Saguinus
- Species: S. niger

Binomial name
- Saguinus niger (É. Geoffroy, 1803)
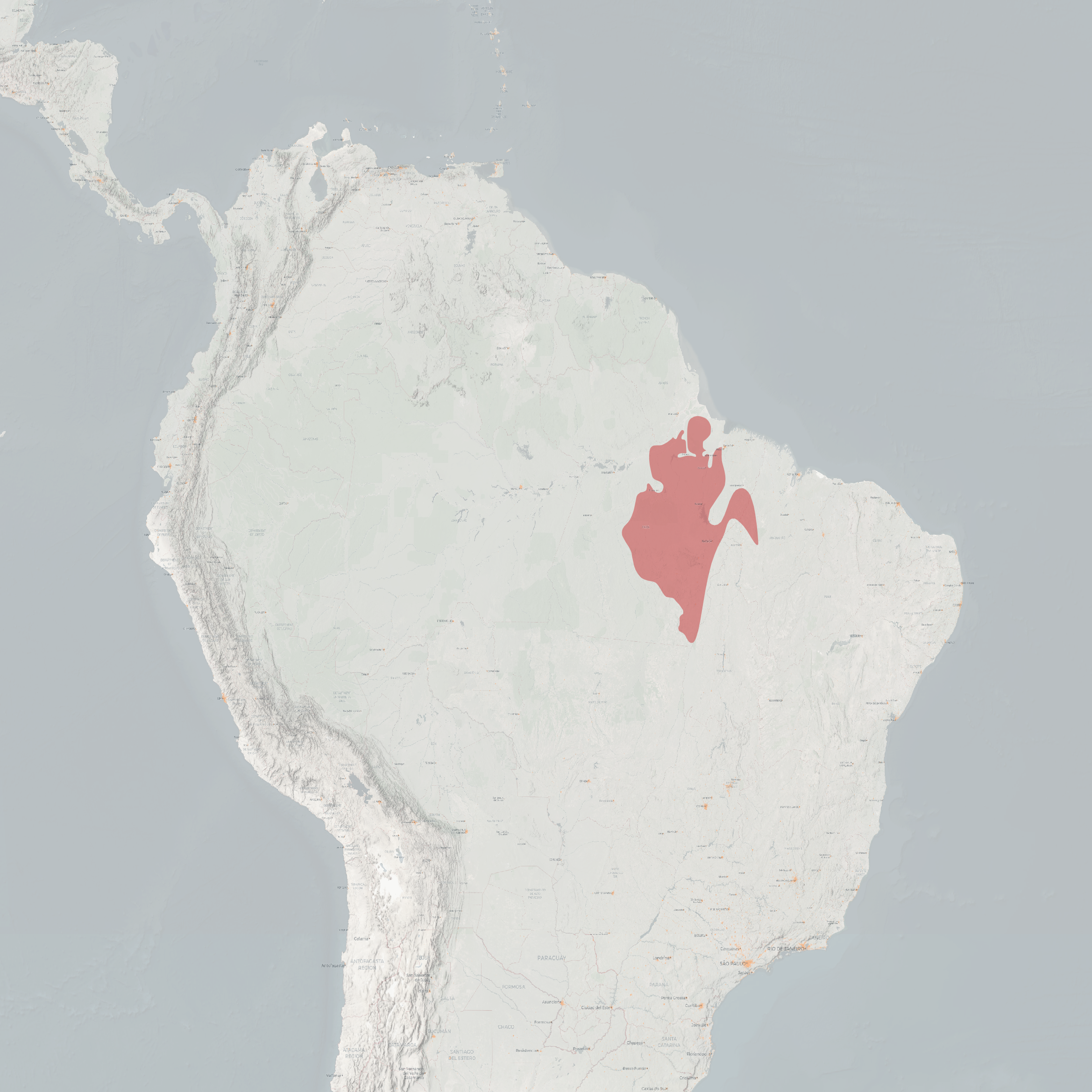
- Range of the Western Black-handed Tamarin

= Black tamarin =

Species of New World monkey

The black tamarin (Saguinus niger) or western black-handed tamarin is a species of tamarin endemic to Brazil.

== Taxonomy ==
Based on mitochondrial DNA analysis, black tamarins were found to be more closely related to populations on the same side of the Tocantins River than on the other, showing that the river constitutes an effective gene flow barrier. As a consequence of the genetic divergence, as well as minor differences in pelage color, some recent authorities have argued for recognizing the population east of the Tocantins River as S. ursulus (eastern black-handed tamarin), leaving the "true" S. niger for the population west of this river.

The closest living relative of the black tamarin is thought to be the golden-handed tamarin (S. midas).

== Description ==
Black-handed tamarins are among the smallest primates, weighing approximately 500 grams. As with other tamarins, the hind limbs are longer than the forelimbs and the thumbs are not opposable. With the exception of the big toe, there are claws on all fingers and toes, as well as two molars on each side of the jaw. The face of the black tamarin is generally hairless. The fur is blackish-brown with lighter markings on the back, similar to the golden-handed tamarin but without the golden-orange feet and hands of that species.

== Distribution and habitat ==
The geographic range of black-handed tamarins, which are endemic to Pará, Brazil, is limited by the Rio Amazonas (Amazon River) to the North, the Rio Tocantins (Tocantins River) to the East, the Rio Xingu (Xingu River) to the West, and until recently, the Rio Gradaus (Gradaus River) to the South. Photographic evidence of a black-handed tamarin in Confresa, a town in the northeastern region of the state of Mato Grosso, indicates an increase in the species' geographic range to the South.

Some marmosets occupy small areas of forest in the Tapajós and Madeira Basins, but the black-handed tamarin is absent from these regions due to lack of food resources. However, this species is considered to be more tolerant of habitat disturbances than other Callitrichides.

Black-handed tamarins are arboreal primates that prefer semi-deciduous forest for ease of foraging and thick growth as cover from aerial and terrestrial predators. Due to deforestation in eastern Brazil, black-handed tamarins regularly rely on fragmented and disturbed secondary forest habitats. Although much of the forest canopy has been destroyed, and black-handed tamarins have been seen moving through all levels of the forest, they are most active in the lower to middle (5-15m) strata of the forest.

== Foraging behavior ==
The species makes use of both primary and secondary forest during foraging, keeping primarily to the canopy and spending minimal time on the ground. Black-handed tamarins subsist largely on fruit. During the dry season (November through January), when fruit is scarcer, they will also take arthropods such as grasshoppers and crickets, and eat the gum of Parkia pendula, an evergreen tree. Even during the dry season, however, fruit from Tetragastris altissima and Inga alba trees is available. During the wet season, over 90 percent of the diet is fruit from as many as nine different species of trees, including Inga stipularis, Inga edulis, Bagassa guianensis, Pouteria lucuma, Pourouma guianesis, Manilkara bidentata, and Chrysophyllum sp.. The seeds of many of these fruits are ingested and defecated. This process plays an important role in the regeneration of forests that are continuously threatened by logging.

== Predators ==
Due to the black-handed tamarin's small size, they are considered prey by many other animals. Their predators include man, diurnal birds of prey, snakes, and various cat species including margay and ocelot, which are capable arboreal hunters. Because black-handed tamarins have both aerial and terrestrial predators, they utilize any tree or bundled, thick foliage into which they can climb, and they maintain a group sleep system to keep safe while resting at night.

The black-handed tamarin's social structure serves as an important line of defense against their predators. While much of their day is spent foraging, each individual keeps a lookout for predators and uses calls to alert their social unit. Although intimidating displays may be made toward predators or in territorial defense, the black-handed tamarin's primary defense is flight. The group aspect of their social structure is important to survival, as a single black-handed tamarin would not be able to forage and keep watch for predators safely and effectively.

== Reproduction ==
=== Breeding behavior ===
Tamarins typically live in extended family groups of 4 to 15 individuals. Although groups of tamarins may have more than one female per group, only one typically breeds (with the exception of Goeldi's marmoset). Dominant female callitrichids suppress the reproductive activity of their daughters and other subordinate females within their family group. Because daughters of dominant females and other females born and remaining in a group tend not to ovulate, when a female becomes sexually mature, there are two options: either find another group or stay in the natal group. In the latter case, the daughter may someday become the dominant female, or she may cease to ovulate. Daughters may compete for the role of dominant female with their siblings. Subordinate members do not generally engage in sexual reproduction.

All adult black-handed tamarin participate in raising and caring for the young, including non-reproductive members of the group (which may number 2-20 members). Group members coordinate and work together to find sufficient food items for infants and juveniles. Unlike many primate groups that provide juveniles with small amounts of food, this species has a cooperative breeding system that shares a substantial portion of food with the juveniles. When group size is large, the breeding male often spends less time attending to his own young because of the universal group effort. When there is sufficient food, or if the dominant female is close to the end of her reproductive cycle, multiple females may be allowed to reproduce in a group.

A number of mating variations have been observed: monogamy, polygyny, polyandry, or polygynandy.

=== Lifetime reproduction ===
Ovulation in female tamarins typically occurs between 12 and 17 months of age, whereas in male tamarins, sperm production occurs slightly later at about 13 to 18 months. The birth of infants has been observed in both early January and mid July. Black-handed tamarins (like all other Callitrichids) usually produce fraternal twins, but litters may consist of 2-4 infants. Triplets and quadruplets usually only occur in captivity. The growth of infants is very rapid; infants become independent within five months. Female callitrichids are able to conceive again after 2–4 weeks of giving birth to their previous offspring.

== Conservation ==
The black-handed tamarin is classified as Vulnerable by the IUCN as a result of a 30% decrease in population size over the last 18 years, and is likely to become endangered if conservation measures are not taken. Because the major threat to the species appears to be a loss of suitable habitat, habitat conservation is thought to be key in their survival. The range of the black-handed tamarin is within one of the most densely inhabited areas of Brazil, where logging has removed a significant amount of the original forest, causing a decrease in food availability and refuges from predators. However, black-handed tamarins are adaptable foragers that can make use of primary, secondary and logged forests, which increases the potential available range of habitat. Populations are present in several reserves where logging is prohibited, including Gurupí Biological Reserve, Tapirapé Biological Reserve, and Caxiuanã National Forest. In central-western Brazil, in the southern part of their range, most black-handed tamarins are only able to survive in the remains of forested areas on private properties.
