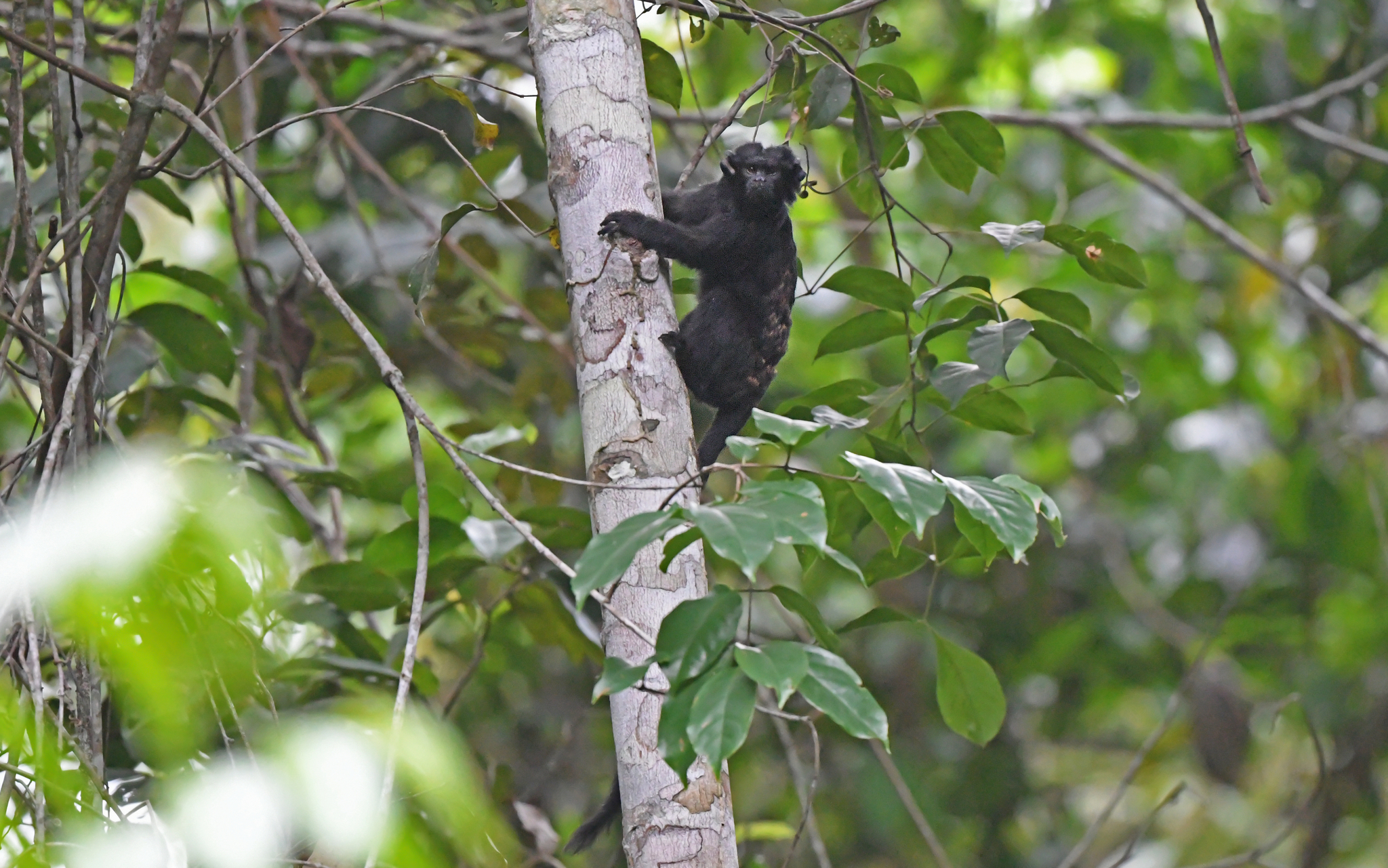

Conservation status
- Vulnerable (IUCN 3.1)

Scientific classification
- Kingdom: Animalia
- Phylum: Chordata
- Class: Mammalia
- Infraclass: Placentalia
- Order: Primates
- Family: Callitrichidae
- Genus: Saguinus
- Species: S. ursulus

Binomial name
- Saguinus ursulus Hoffmannsegg, 1807
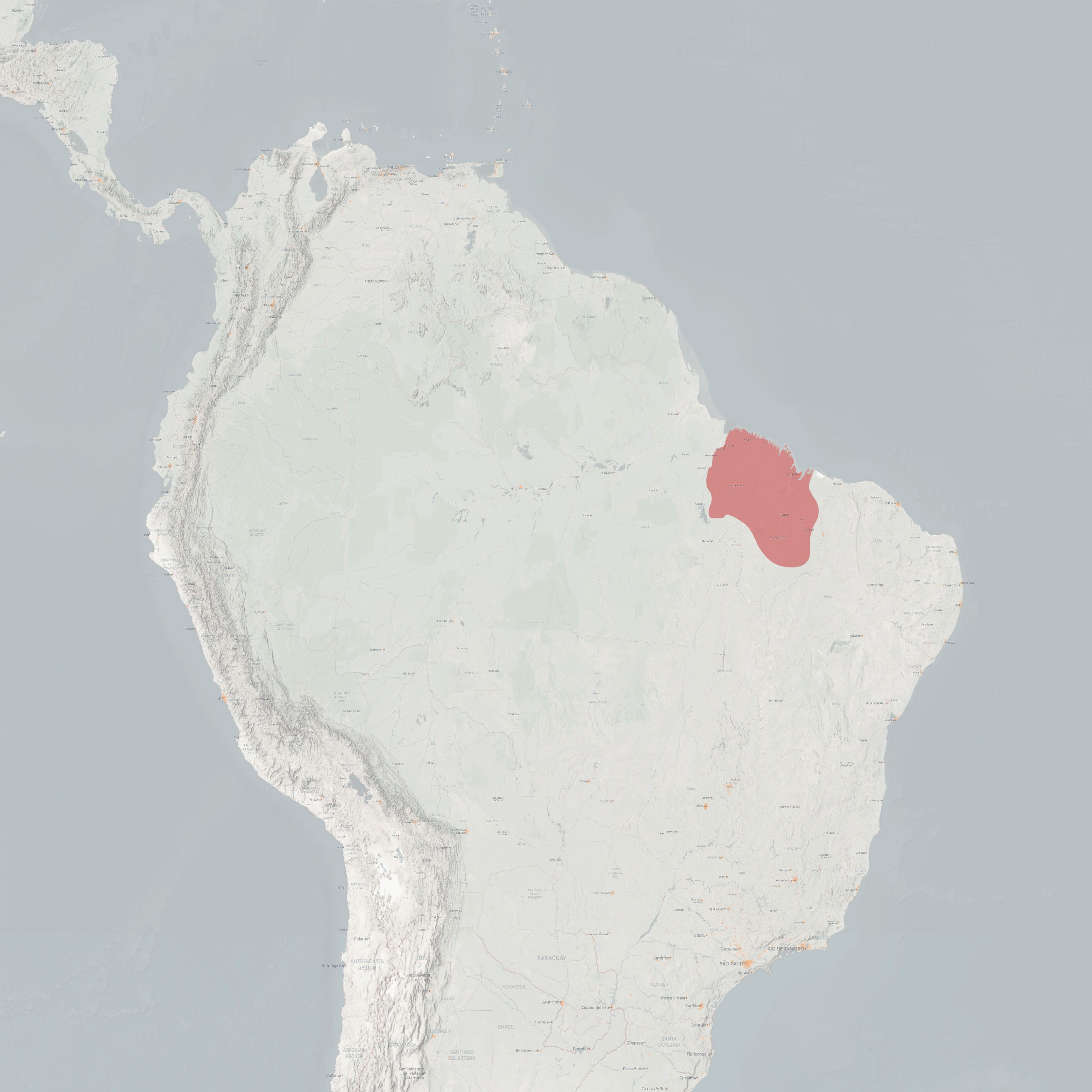
- Range of the Eastern Black-handed Tamarin

= Eastern black-handed tamarin =

Species of New World monkey

The eastern black-handed tamarin (Saguinus ursulus) is a species of tamarin endemic to Brazil.

== Taxonomy ==
Saguinus ursulus was described in 1807 by the German zoologist Johann Centurius Hoffmannsegg. It was later synonymised, first with S. midas and then with S. niger. In 2013, S. ursulus was revalidated based on differences in coat color and morphological divergences, which were corroborated by molecular data. Based on mitochondrial DNA analysis, Saguinus niger, the black-handed tamarin, was split into two species: S. niger, the western black-handed tamarin, and S. ursulus, the eastern black-handed tamarin. The Tocantins River which divided the range was found to constitute an effective gene flow barrier. As a consequence of the genetic divergence, as well as minor differences in pelage color, the population east of the Tocantins River was recognised as a separate species.
