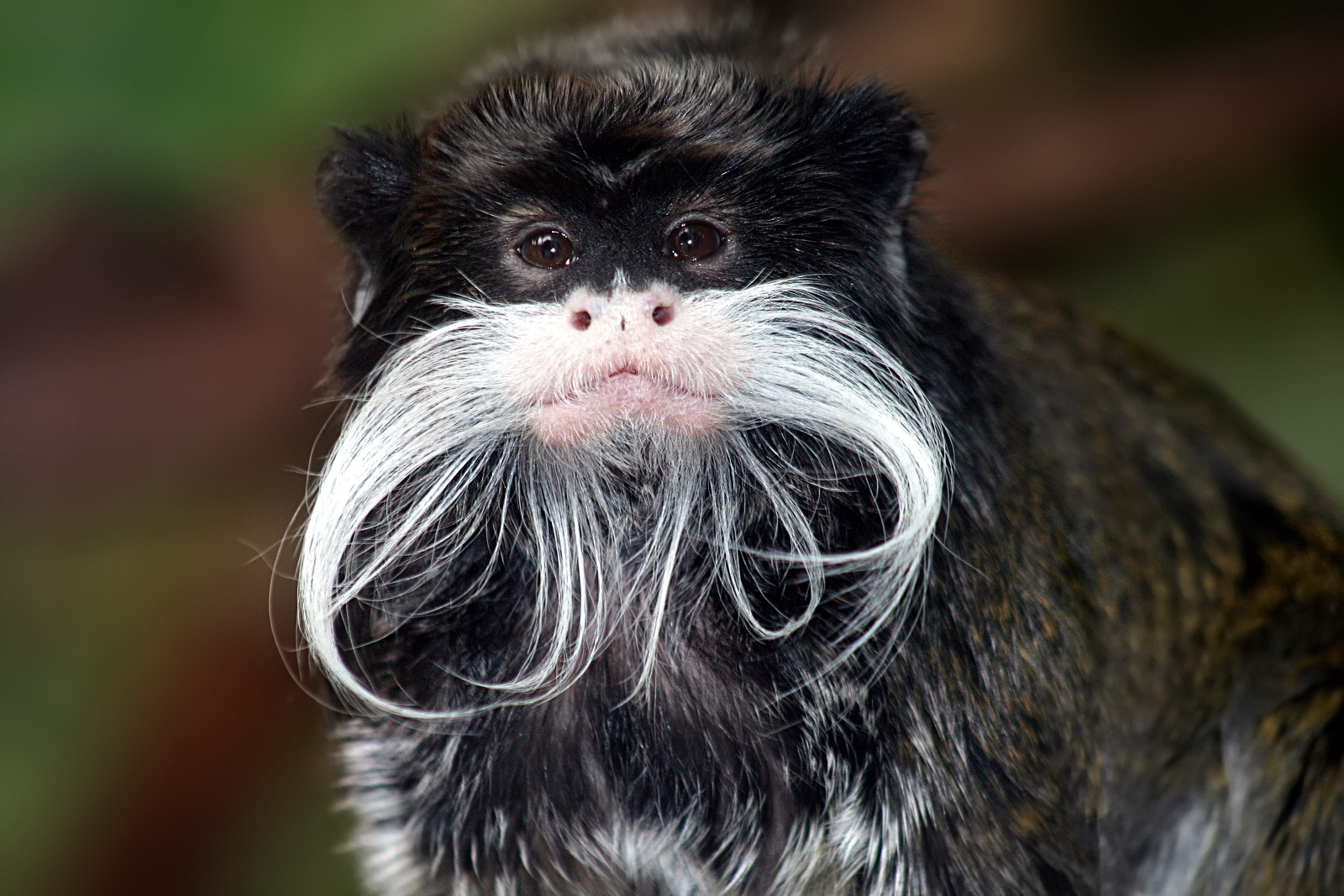
- Emperor tamarin (Saguinus imperator)

Scientific classification
- Kingdom: Animalia
- Phylum: Chordata
- Class: Mammalia
- Infraclass: Placentalia
- Order: Primates
- Family: Callitrichidae
- Genus: Saguinus; Hoffmannsegg, 1807

Type species
- Saguinus ursulus Hoffmannsegg, 1807

Species
- 22 species, see text

Synonyms
- Hapanella Gray, 1870; Marikina Lesson, 1840; Midas E. Geoffroy, 1812; Mystax Gray, 1870; Oedipomidus Reichenbach, 1862; Oedipus Lesson, 1840; Seniocebus Gray, 1870; Tamarin Gray, 1870

= Tamarin =

Tamarins

Genus of New World monkeys

The tamarins are squirrel-sized New World monkeys from the family Callitrichidae in the genus Saguinus. They are the first offshoot in the Callitrichidae tree, and therefore are the sister group of a clade formed by the lion tamarins, Goeldi's monkeys and marmosets.

== Taxonomy and evolutionary history ==
Hershkovitz (1977) recognised ten species in the genus Saguinus, further divided into 33 morphotypes based on facial pelage. A later classification into two clades was based on variations in dental measurements. A taxonomic review (Rylands et al., 2016) showed the tamarins are a sister group to all other callitrichids, branching off 15–13 million years ago. Within this clade, six species groups are historically recognised, nigricollis, mystax, midas, inustus, bicolor and oedipus, five of which were shown to be valid with Saguinus inustus placed within the midas group. The review noted that the smaller-bodied nigricollis group began diverging 11–8 million years ago, leading the authors to move them to a separate genus, Leontocebus (saddle-back tamarins). While a 2018 study proposed that Leontocebus does not have sufficient divergence from Saguinus to be in its own genus, and thus should be reclassified it as a subgenus of Saguinus, this proposal has since found significant traction. The same study found the mystax group of tamarins to be distinct enough to be classified in the subgenus Tamarinus. As of 2021 this proposal has not been universally accepted by primatologists.

=== Taxonomic classification ===
Following the taxonomic review of tamarins by Rylands et al. (2016) and Garbino & Martins-Junior (2018), there are 22 species in the genus Saguinus with 19 subspecies.

- Genus Saguinus
  - Subgenus Saguinus Hoffmannsegg, 1807
    - S. midas group
      - Golden-handed tamarin, midas tamarin, or red-handed tamarin, Saguinus midas
      - Western black-handed tamarin or black tamarin, Saguinus niger
      - Eastern black-handed tamarin, Saguinus ursulus
    - S. bicolor group
      - Pied tamarin, Saguinus bicolor
      - Martins's tamarin, Saguinus martinsi
        - Martins's bare-face tamarin, Saguinus martinsi martinsi
        - Ochraceus bare-face tamarin, Saguinus martinsi ochraceus
    - S. oedipus group
      - Cotton-top tamarin or Pinché tamarin, Saguinus oedipus
      - Geoffroy's tamarin, Saguinus geoffroyi
      - White-footed tamarin, Saguinus leucopus
  - Subgenus Tamarinus Trouessart, 1904
    - Moustached tamarin, Saguinus mystax
      - Spix's moustached tamarin, Saguinus mystax mystax
      - Red-capped tamarin, Saguinus mystax pileatus
      - White-rump moustached tamarin, Saguinus mystax pluto
    - White-lipped tamarin, Saguinus labiatus
      - Geoffroy's red-bellied tamarin, Saguinus labiatus labiatus
      - Thomas's red-bellied tamarin, Saguinus labiatus thomasi
      - Gray's red-bellied tamarin, Saguinus labiatus rufiventer
    - Emperor tamarin, Saguinus imperator
      - Black-chinned emperor tamarin, Saguinus imperator imperator
      - Bearded emperor tamarin, Saguinus imperator subgrisescens
    - Mottle-faced tamarin, Saguinus inustus

== Description ==
Tamarin species vary considerably in appearance, ranging from nearly all black through mixtures of black, brown and white. Mustache-like facial hairs are typical for many species. Their body size ranges from 13 to 30 cm (5.1 to 11.8 in) (plus a 25-to-44 cm-long (9.8-to-17.3 in) tail). They weigh from 348 to 575 grams (12.3 to 20.3 oz). In captivity, red-bellied tamarins have been recorded living up to 20.5 years, while cotton-top tamarins can live up to 23 years old.

== Distribution ==
Tamarins are found from southern Central America through to central South America, where they are found in northwestern Colombia, the Amazon basin, and the Guianas.

== Behavior and reproduction ==
Tamarins are inhabitants of tropical rainforests and open forest areas. They are diurnal and arboreal, and run and jump quickly through the trees. Tamarins live together in groups of up to 40 members consisting of one or more families. More frequently, though, groups are composed of just three to nine members.

Tamarins are omnivores, eating fruits and other plant parts as well as spiders, insects, small vertebrates and bird eggs.

Gestation is typically 140 days, and births are normally twins. The adult males, subadults, and juveniles in the group assist with caring for the young, bringing them to their mother to nurse. After approximately one month the young begin to eat solid food, although they are not fully weaned for another two to three months. They reach full maturity in their second year. Tamarins are almost exclusively polyandrous.

Cottontop tamarins (Saguinus oedipus) breed cooperatively in the wild. Cronin, Kurian, and Snowdon tested eight cottontop tamarins in a series of cooperative pulling experiments. Two monkeys were put on opposite sides of a transparent apparatus containing food. Only if both monkeys pulled a handle on their side of the apparatus towards themselves at the same time would food drop down for them to obtain. The results showed that tamarins pulled the handles at a lower rate when alone with the apparatus than when in the presence of a partner. Cronin, Kurian, and Snowdon concluded from this that cottontop tamarins have a good understanding of cooperation. They suggest that cottontop tamarins have developed cooperative behaviour as a cognitive adaptation.

In some locations, saddle-back tamarins (subgenus Leontocebus) live sympatrically with tamarins of the subgenus Saguinus, but the saddle-back tamarins typically occupy lower strata of the forest than do the Saguinus species. Saddle-back tamarins have longer and narrower hands than Saguinus species, possibly adaption to differing foraging behavior, as saddle-back tamarins are more likely to search for insects that are hidden in knotholes, crevices, bromeliad tanks and leaf litter, while Saguinus species are more likely to forage for insects that are exposed on surfaces such as leaves or branches. This differentiation in lifestyles was why both were formerly considered different genera.

== Predators ==
While tamarins spend much of their day foraging, they must be on high alert for aerial and terrestrial predators. Due to their small size compared to other primates, they are an easy target for predatory birds, snakes, and mammals.
