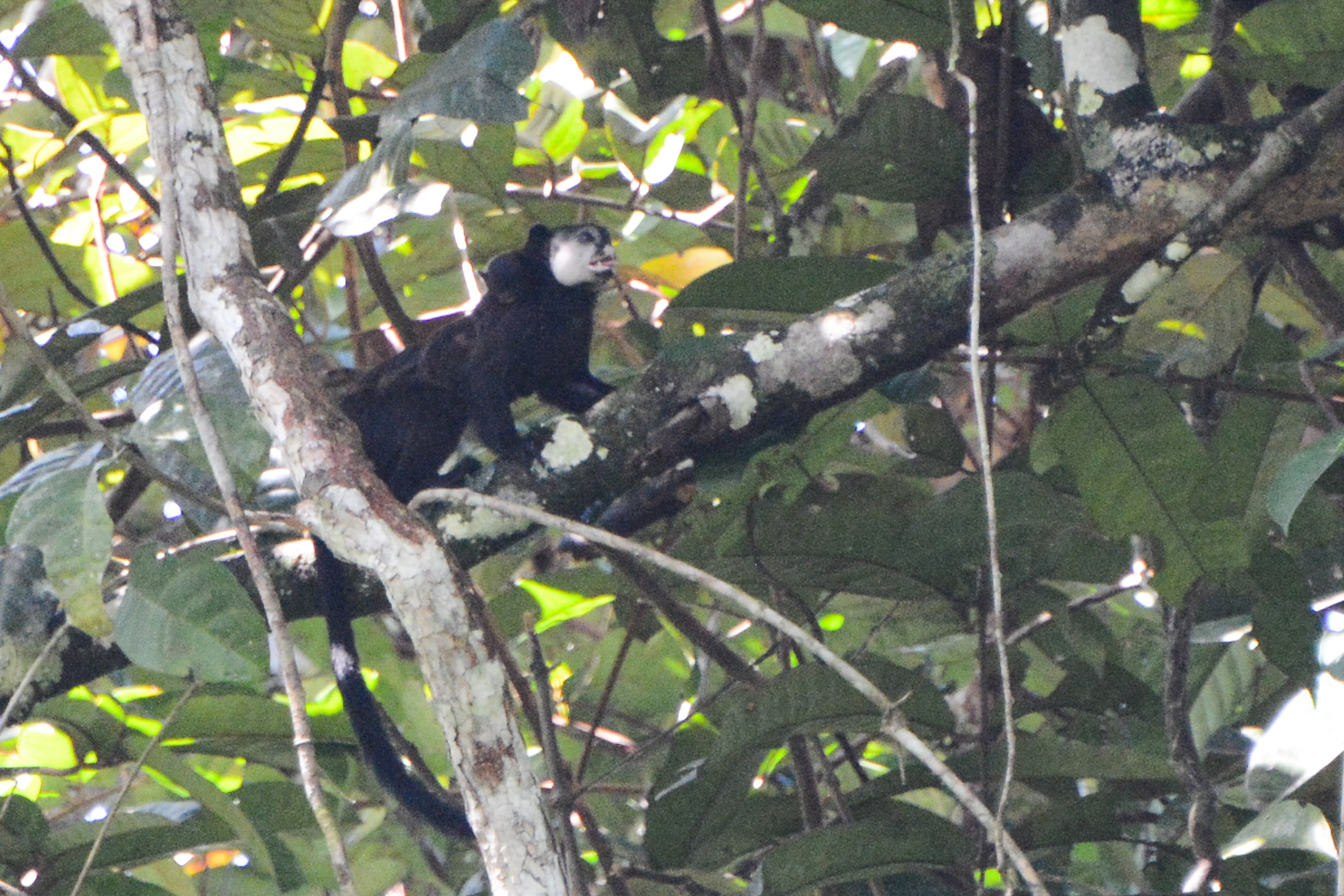
- Adult and young near Mitú, Colombia

Conservation status
- Least Concern (IUCN 3.1)

Scientific classification
- Kingdom: Animalia
- Phylum: Chordata
- Class: Mammalia
- Infraclass: Placentalia
- Order: Primates
- Family: Callitrichidae
- Genus: Saguinus
- Species: S. inustus

Binomial name
- Saguinus inustus (Schwarz, 1951)
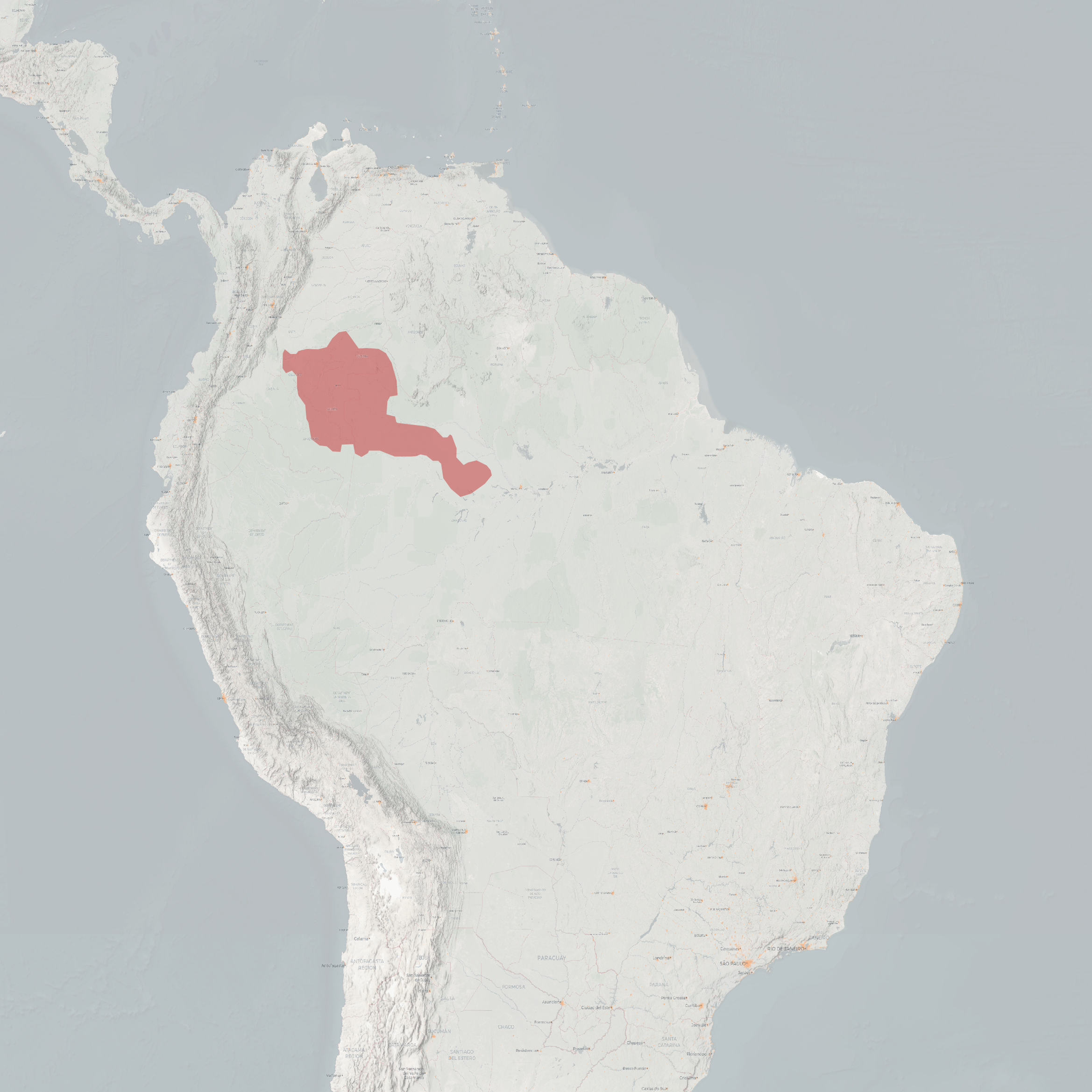
- Range of the Mottled-face Tamarin

= Mottle-faced tamarin =

Species of New World monkey

The mottle-faced tamarin (Saguinus inustus) is a species of tamarin from South America. It is found in Brazil and Colombia.

== Interaction With Humans ==
Mottle-faced tamarins are not hunted by locals, due to their "small size" and instead some are even kept as pets.
