= Martins's tamarin =

Conservation status
- Near Threatened (IUCN 3.1)
- CITES Appendix I

Scientific classification
- Kingdom: Animalia
- Phylum: Chordata
- Class: Mammalia
- Infraclass: Placentalia
- Order: Primates
- Family: Callitrichidae
- Genus: Saguinus
- Species: S. martinsi

Binomial name
- Saguinus martinsi (Thomas, 1912)

Subspecies
- S. m. martinsi Thomas, 1912 S. m. ochraceus Hershkovitz, 1966
- Range of the Martins's Bare-faced Tamarin

Species of New World monkey

Martins's tamarin (Saguinus martinsi) or Martin's ochraceous bare-face tamarin, is a species of tamarin endemic to Brazil.

== Taxonomy ==
Martin's tamarin is a monkey in the genus Saguinus. It has two subspecies: S. m. martinsi and S. m. ochraceus. Both subspecies were formerly considered to be subspecies of the pied tamarin: Saguinus bicolor martinsi and S. b. ochraceus. Subspecies martinsi is commonly known as Martin's bare-face tamarin; subspecies ochraceus is commonly known as the ochraceous bare-faced tamarin.
