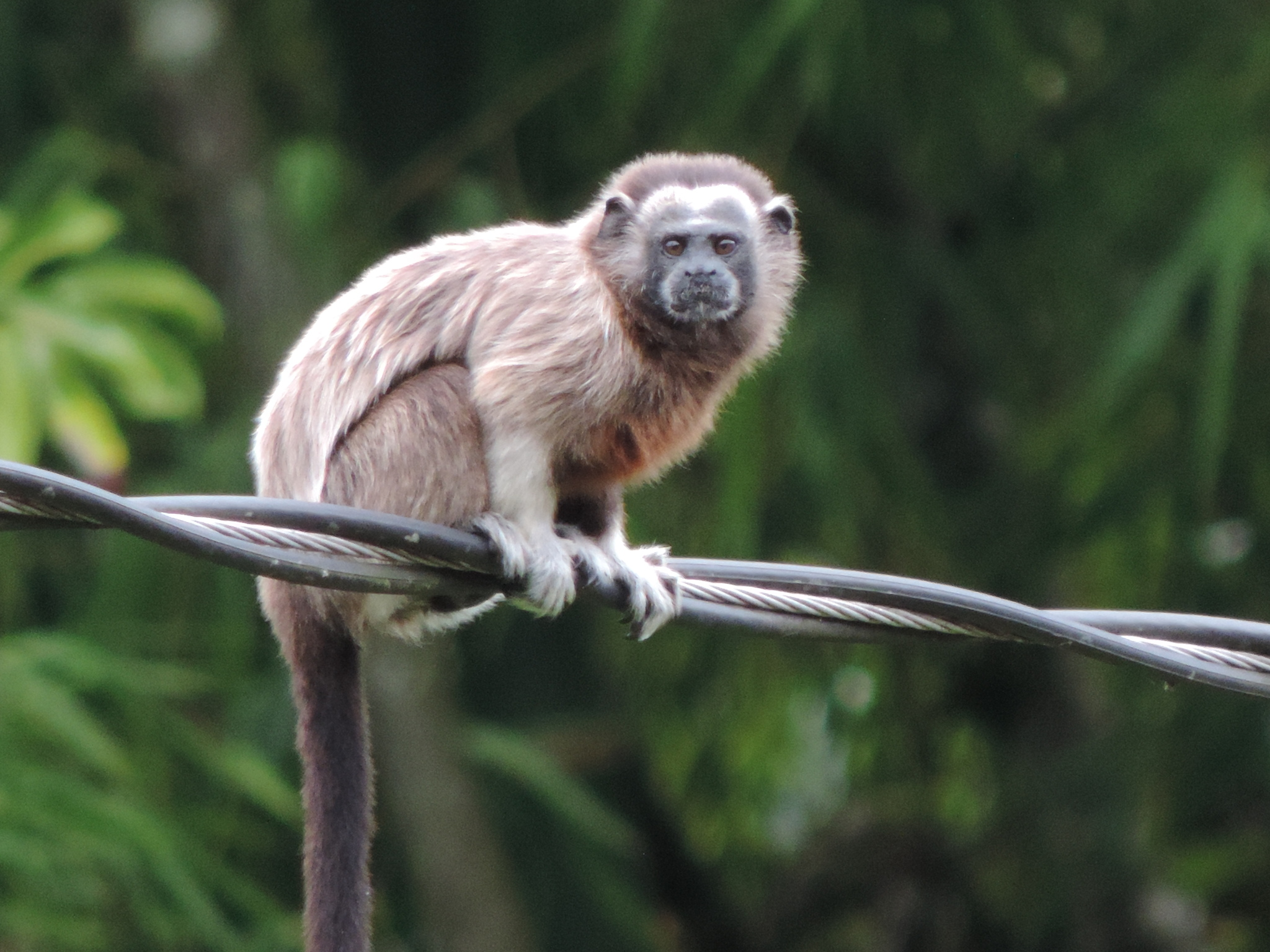

Conservation status
- Vulnerable (IUCN 3.1)
- CITES Appendix I

Scientific classification
- Kingdom: Animalia
- Phylum: Chordata
- Class: Mammalia
- Order: Primates
- Family: Callitrichidae
- Genus: Saguinus
- Species: S. leucopus

Binomial name
- Saguinus leucopus (Günther, 1877)
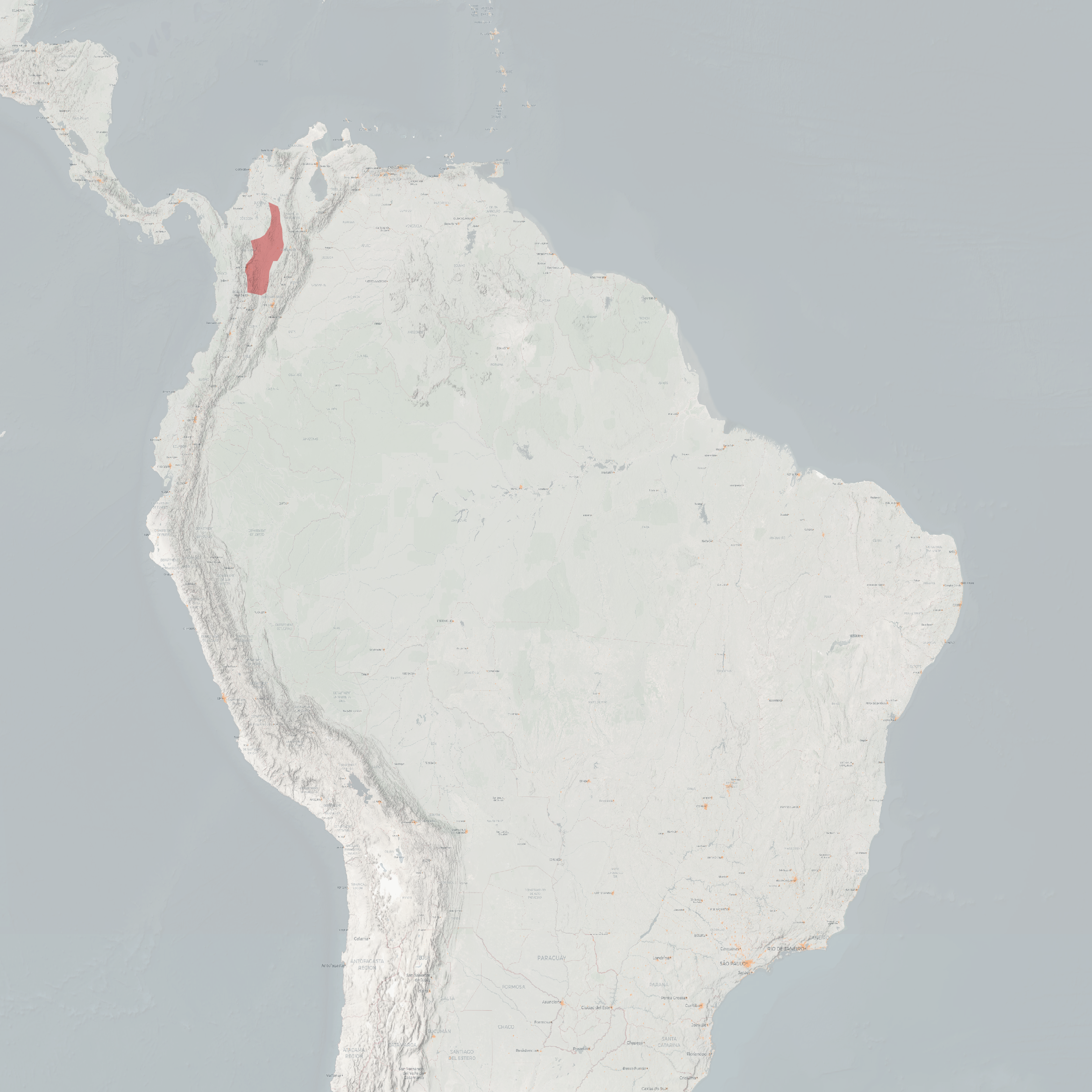
- Range of the White-footed Tamarin

= White-footed tamarin =

Species of New World monkey

The white-footed tamarin (Saguinus leucopus) is a tamarin species endemic to Colombia. It is a silvery brown colour with pale streaks and russet underparts, and is very similar in appearance to the cotton-top tamarin, from which it is separated by the Atrato River. It is thought that the two species diverged during the Pleistocene, at a time when a sea occupied the area between their present ranges. This tamarin is an arboreal species, living in small family groups in the canopy. Females give birth to one to three young after a gestation period of about 140 days. This species has a relatively small range and is under threat from destruction and fragmentation of the forest in which it lives and the International Union for Conservation of Nature has assessed its conservation status as "vulnerable".

== Taxonomy and phylogeny ==
Some authorities, such as Thorington (1976), posit that S. leucopus is very closely related to the cotton-top tamarin, Saguinus oedipus. Other analyses made by Hernandez-Camacho & Cooper (1976), and later Mittermeier and Coimbra-Filho in 1981, and finally Grooves (2001) This view is supported by Hanihara & Natoria's multivariate analysis of toothcomb dental morphology (1987) and by Skinner's work in 1991, which found high similarity between S. oedipus and S. leucopus in 16 out of 17 morphological traits considered. This is further supported by the transition from child to adult, during which the fur coloration changes take place and are similar between the two species. Philip Hershkovitz proposed that the divergence of the two species occurred in the Pleistocene at the height of the Atrato River, where it intersected the Cauca-Magdalena. At this time, the area was covered by a sea, which created a geographic barrier which caused this ancestral species to diverge from S. oedipus through the process of allopatric speciation. Today, the two species are principally separated by the Atrato river.

== Description ==
The white-footed tamarin exhibits a silvery pale brown back with lighter streaks. The front is russet colored. The tail is brown, sometimes with a white tip. Feet and hands are also white. The face is only thinly furred with white hairs. Thick brown hair is around the neck and between the ears. Its forelimbs are shorter than its hindlimbs. Its vision, auditory, and olfactory senses are very sharp. Average adult male can weigh 494 g and the average adult female is only slightly smaller, weighing 490 g. Other primates have nails on each digit but tamarins have claws on all digits except the big toe.

== Behavior ==
The white-footed tamarin uses scent glands to mark its territory. It lives in a group with its extended family of four to fifteen individuals. It lives in trees and is active during the day. Very agile in the trees, it uses all four limbs (quadrupedal) to aid in maneuvering through the branches.

The white-footed tamarin exhibits polyandrous reproduction, meaning one female will mate with more than one male. Gestation cycle is 130–150 days. Females will give birth to one to three young and males have a role in rearing the young and carrying them on his back. Maturity is 12–18 months old. Two birthing seasons have been recorded, one between May and June and the other between October and November.

== Ecology ==
The white-footed tamarin lives in tropical dry forests, tropical wet forests, primary and secondary forests. It prefers the edges of forests, close to streams.

Its diet consists of insects, soft fruits, and nectar, plant exudates, prey animals, and flowers.

== Status ==
The forests in which the white-footed tamarin lives are disappearing rapidly as the land is used for logging and mining, cleared for agriculture and for the construction of roads and dams. Populations of the tamarin are declining and some animals are sold in local markets as pets. As a result of these factors, the International Union for Conservation of Nature has assessed the animal's conservation status as being "vulnerable".
