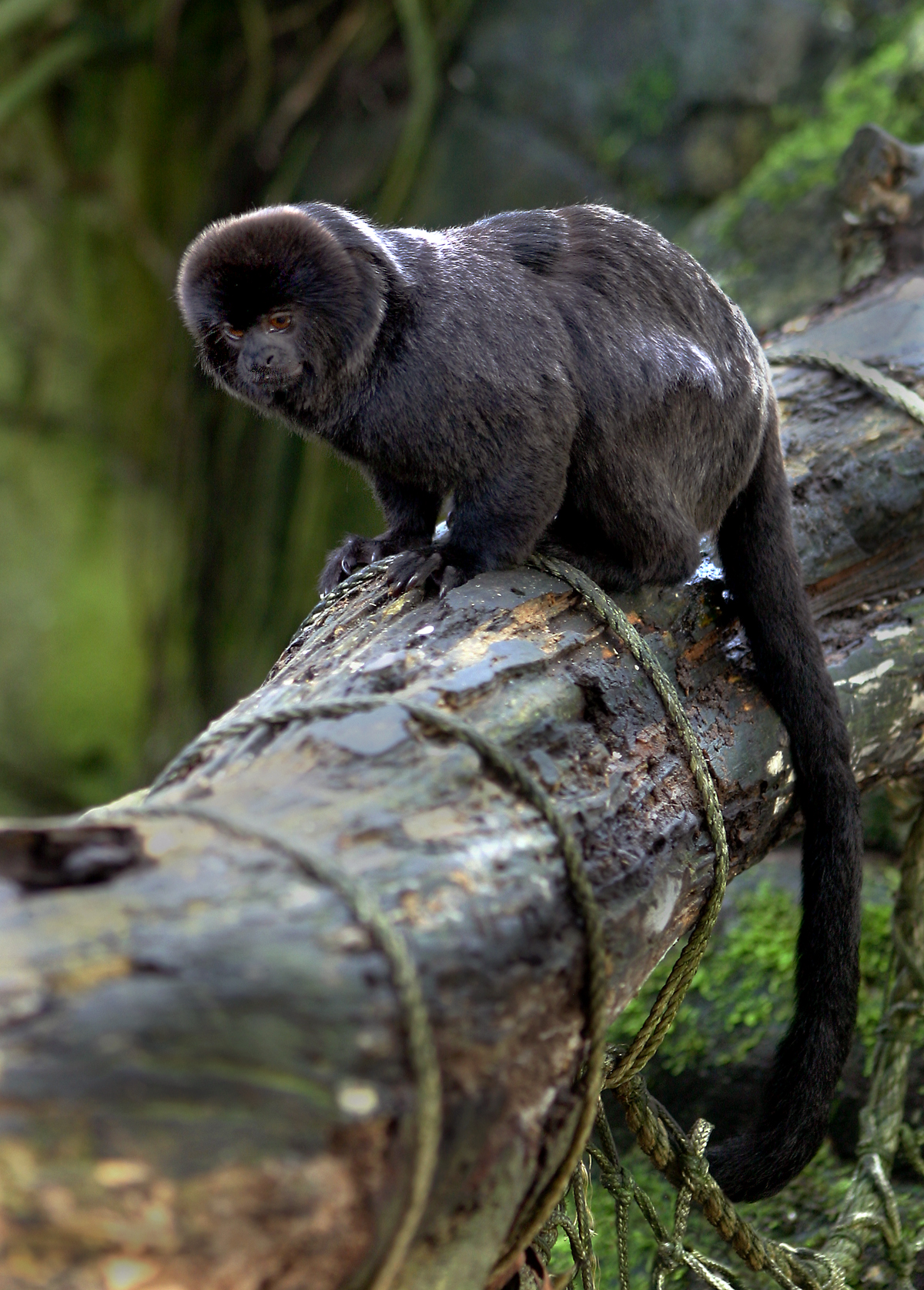

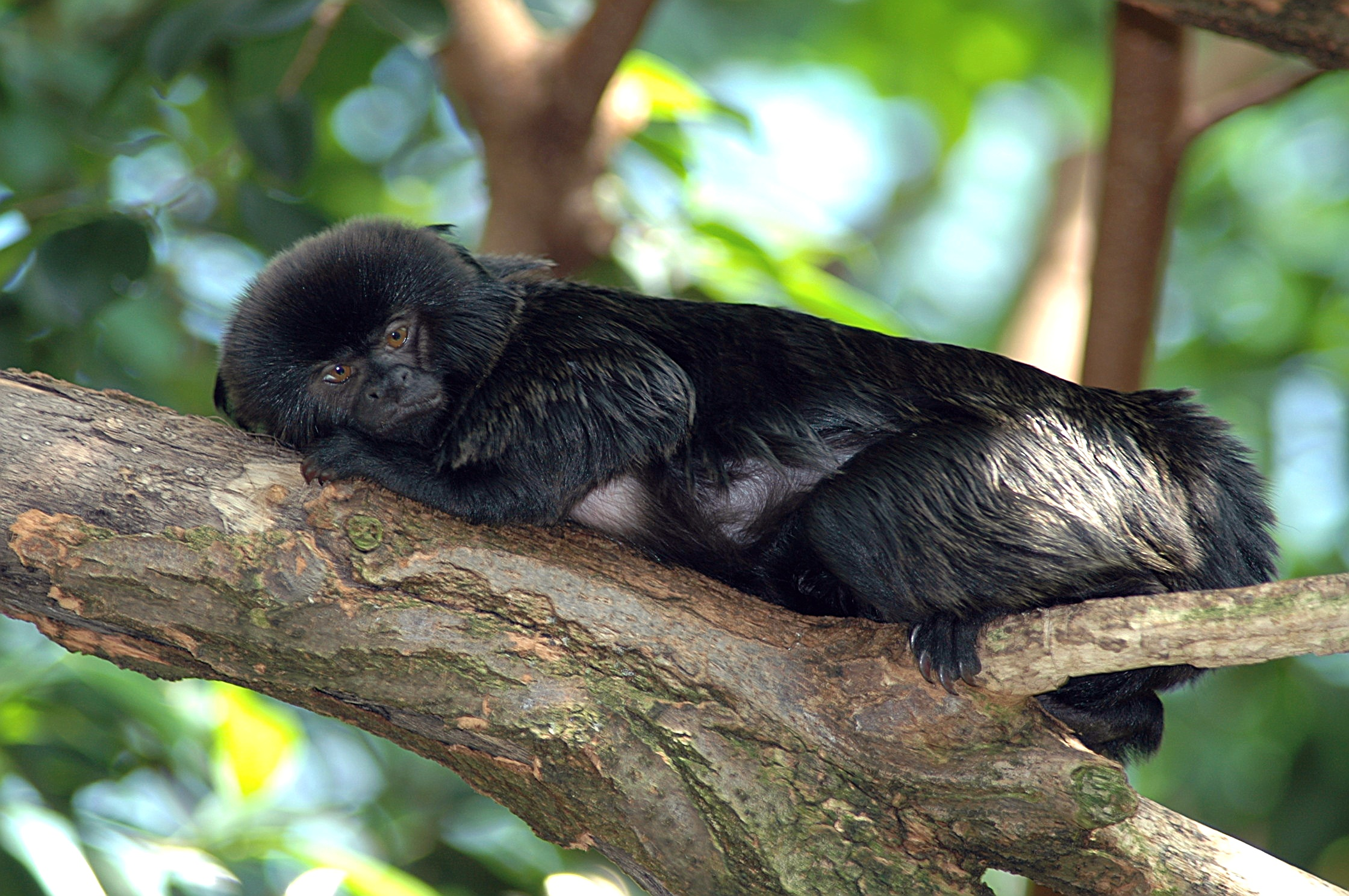

Conservation status
- Vulnerable (IUCN 3.1)
- CITES Appendix I

Scientific classification
- Kingdom: Animalia
- Phylum: Chordata
- Class: Mammalia
- Order: Primates
- Family: Callitrichidae
- Genus: Callimico; Miranda-Ribeiro, 1922
- Species: C. goeldii

Binomial name
- Callimico goeldii Thomas, 1904
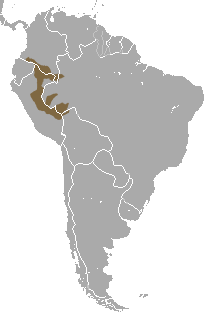
- Geographic range

Synonyms
- snethlageri Miranda-Ribeiro, 1912

= Goeldi's marmoset =

Species of New World monkey

Goeldi's marmoset, or Goeldi's monkey (Callimico goeldii), is a small New World monkey found on the South American continent, mainly in the upper Amazon basin of Bolivia, Brazil, Colombia, and Perú. It is the only species classified in the monotypic genus Callimico, thus these monkeys are sometimes referred to as "callimicos". The species takes its name from its discoverer, Swiss-Brazilian naturalist Emil August Goeldi.

Likely an evolutionary adaptation for camouflage and the evasion of predators, Goeldi's marmosets are a dark-furred species, usually a blackish-gray or darker brown in color. Superficially, the short hair on their head gives them a vague resemblance to the larger woolly monkey (Lagothrix); however, the back of their necks, their backside, and tails often display light, horizontal striping or highlights. Their bodies are about 8–9 in (200–230 mm) long, and their tails are about another 10–12 in (250–300 mm) long. Captive Goeldi's marmosets weigh around 480 g (17 oz), while observed individuals were approximately 500 g (18 oz) in the wild. Their digits have claw-like nails, except for the hallux, which serves for clinging, scansorial (arboreal) movement and escape, and the extraction of certain food sources from trees, such as fruits, honey, seed pods, etc.

== Taxonomy and evolution ==
Goeldi's marmoset was first described in 1904, making Callimico one of the more recent monkey genera to be described. In older classification schemes it was sometimes placed in its own family Callimiconidae and sometimes, along with the marmosets and tamarins, in the subfamily Callitrichinae in the family Cebidae. More recently, Callitrichinae has been (re-)elevated to family status as Callitrichidae.

Molecular phylogenetics shows that C. goeldii evolved from an ancestral callitrichine and shares this origin with marmosets making them sister taxa. One evolutionary argument to account for their differences, states that C. goeldii conserves primitive traits such as single births and a third molar lost in many marmosets. Alternatively, another evolutionary argument indicates that Callimicos came from a two-molar marmoset and reintroduced the remote traits, which in either case selectively give them the ability to access to different resources and occupy different niches. Similarities in delayed embryonic development and secondary limb-bone ossification between C. goeldii and marmosets are evidence of their close evolutionary relationship.

== Reproduction ==
Females reach sexual maturity at 8.5 months, males at 16.5 months. The gestation period lasts from 144 to 159 days. Callimicos studied in captivity in North America and Europe for near 40 years have shown to produce on average 3.5 offspring during their lifetime. However, 30% of the females and 45% of the males observed in these settings never reproduced.

Unlike other New World monkeys, they have the capacity to give birth twice a year. Biannual births occur regularly in captivity and less consistently in the wild and are attributed to postpartum estrus that allows the female to be ready to reproduce soon after parturition. The availability of fungus—an important food source for C. goeldii—throughout the year also contributes to these multiple births.

The mother carries a single baby monkey per pregnancy, whereas most other species in the family Callitrichidae usually give birth to twins. These singleton births provide the offspring with longer maternal care and weaning delay that results in faster growth rates and in turn earlier sexual maturity than the other marmosets.

== Infant care ==
For the first 2–3 weeks the mother acts as the primary caregiver after which the father and the helpers, who are often the siblings, share many of the responsibilities. However, mothers in the wild have been observed giving their babies to other members of the troop as early as 10 days after parturition, which is late for other marmosets.

At birth, Callimico offspring weigh 10% the weight of their mother's whereas the twinning marmosets weight double that amount, which explains the delay in allocare in C. goeldii since it is not as crucial as it is for its counterparts. Cooperative care in callitrichines is therefore necessary to help mothers recover from gestation, parturition, and lactation as well as to share the energetic cost of carrying the infant among the helpers and the father.

Caregivers must also provide food to the infants when they turn 4 weeks of age. The task of food provisioning includes tolerance to food robbing since infants are at a stage of learning how to forage by themselves. Also at week 4, mothers stop nursing in the wild, but that behaviour is believed to be influenced by the presence of the observers and therefore, it is suspected that nursing resumes when humans are not present. In captivity, nursing extends until the infant is 8–15 weeks old. Thus, the offspring will be weaned when it becomes about 63 days of age. There is no difference between male and female helpers on the amount of involvement on infant care. Even juvenile C. goeldii participate as active caregivers.

Infants are carried entirely during the first month and 63% of the time on the next month. They do not leave their guardian side until they become 2.5 months of age and around 3 months old, they are rarely carried, but locomotive independence comes more forcibly than voluntarily. Females outnumber males by 2 to 1. The life expectancy in captivity is about 10 years.

== Development ==
From birth to about 18 months old, callimicos grow faster than other marmosets in part because the energy they would otherwise invest on thermal regulation and activity costs if they were not carried by their mothers is instead directed to growth. Likewise, a longer lactation period is also responsible for a faster development. Growth rate and weight gain is similar in both male and female infants and juveniles.

== Distribution and habitat ==
Callimicos's geographic distribution extends from the Colombian Amazon and the Río Caquetá (Portuguese: Japurá) to the Peruvian and the western Brazilian Amazon, into the Pando department of northwestern Bolivia, where high densities have been reported. Its presence in Ecuador has yet to be officially confirmed. The distribution of the species is patchy, and its density seems to be dependent on polyspecific associations with tamarins.

Sightings of Goeldi's marmosets have been made at the base of the Cordillera Oriental of the Andes in Colombia, in the Department of Putumayo, along the Putumayo and Caquetá Rivers.

In Peru's northern interior, they occur in the Pucacuro National Reserve, close to the Río Tigre, where they are known as chi-chi by locals. To the south, they have been found at the Centro de Investigación y Capacitación Río Los Amigos (or Los Amigos River Training and Research Center, CICRA), Manu National Park, and the Concesión de Conservación Rodal Semillero Tahuamanu (CCRST), in addition to adjacent and surrounding areas. They were also spotted near the Yura River and Sierra del Divisor National Park in groups of three to twelve individuals.

Some observations were previously recorded via the live-trapping of marmosets, beginning in the 1970s until the early 2010s; on one occasion, the captured marmosets were taken for closer examination and breeding at the Centro de Conservación y Reprodución de Primates, Iquitos. Using food baits at stationary sites, and recordings of their vocalizations, and those of tamarins, with whom they associate, were also employed to attract them.

In Brazil, Goeldi's marmosets occur in the southwest Amazon in the west-central state of Acre, over the Serra do Divisor, south near the Juruá and into the Gregório, Amazonas; they can also be found near the Laco River, further south to the upper Purús and in the Madeira basin, as well as near the Abunã River, Rondônia. High densities of this species have been recorded in the Pando department in Bolivia.

Goeldi's marmosets prefer to forage in dense, scrubby undergrowth; perhaps because of this, they are rare, with groups living in separate patches of preferred habitat, separated by miles of unfavorable habitat. In the wet season, their diet includes fruits, flowers, flying insects, spiders, mollusks, small lizards, tree frogs and small or young snakes. In the dry season, they feed on fungi, the only tropical primates known to choose this as a source of sustenance. They live in small social groups, of approximately six individuals, that stay within a few feet of one another most of the time, staying in contact via high-pitched calls. They are also known to form polyspecific or interspecific groups with tamarins such as the white-lipped tamarin and brown-mantled tamarin. This is perhaps because Goeldi's marmosets are not known to have the X-linked polymorphism which enables some individuals of other New World monkey species to see in full tri-chromatic vision.

== Gallery ==
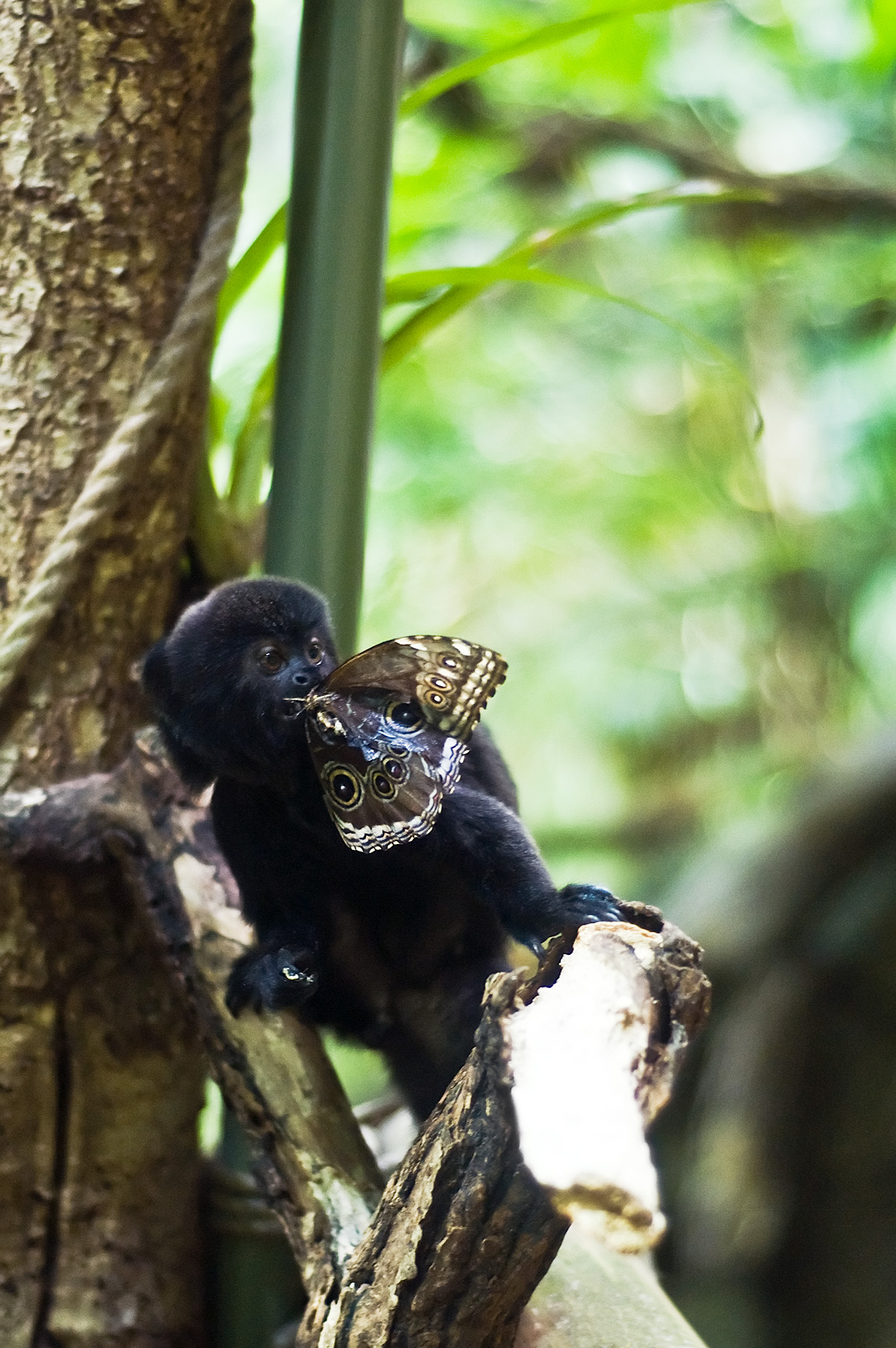
Marmoset eating a butterfly

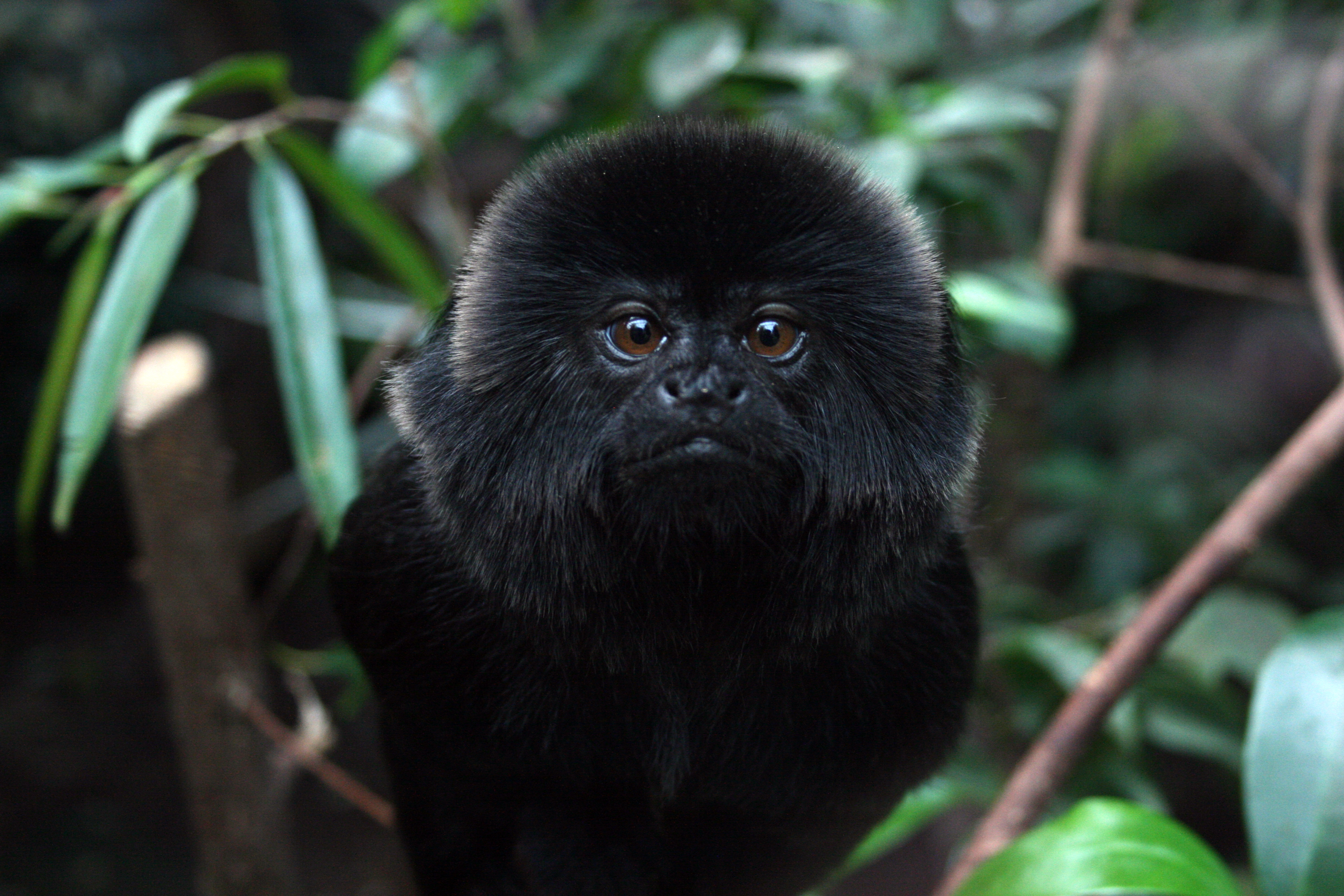
At The Living Rain Forest in Berkshire, UK

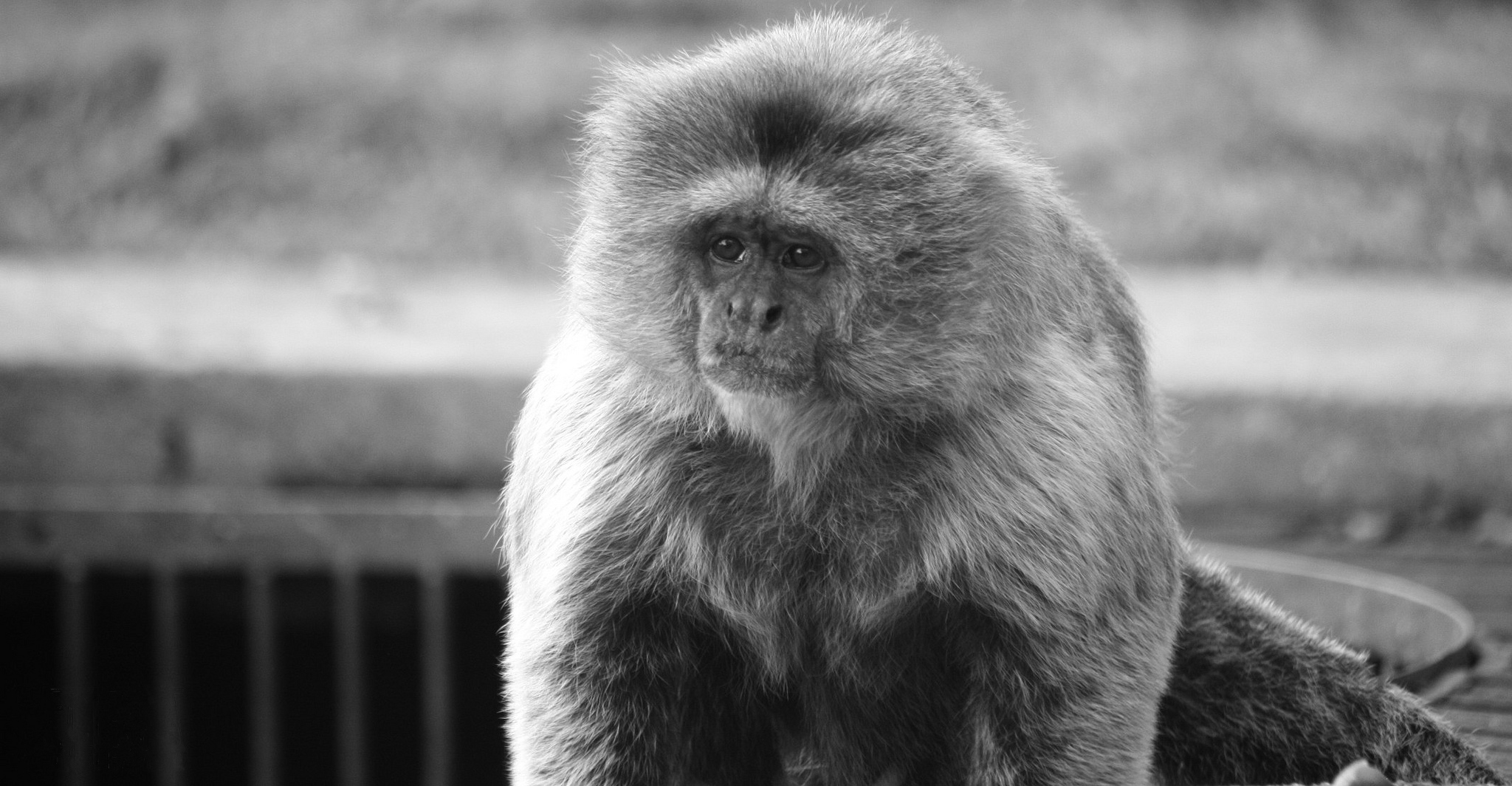
Marmoset in Venezuela

Callimico goeldii at Universeum, Gothenburg, Sweden
