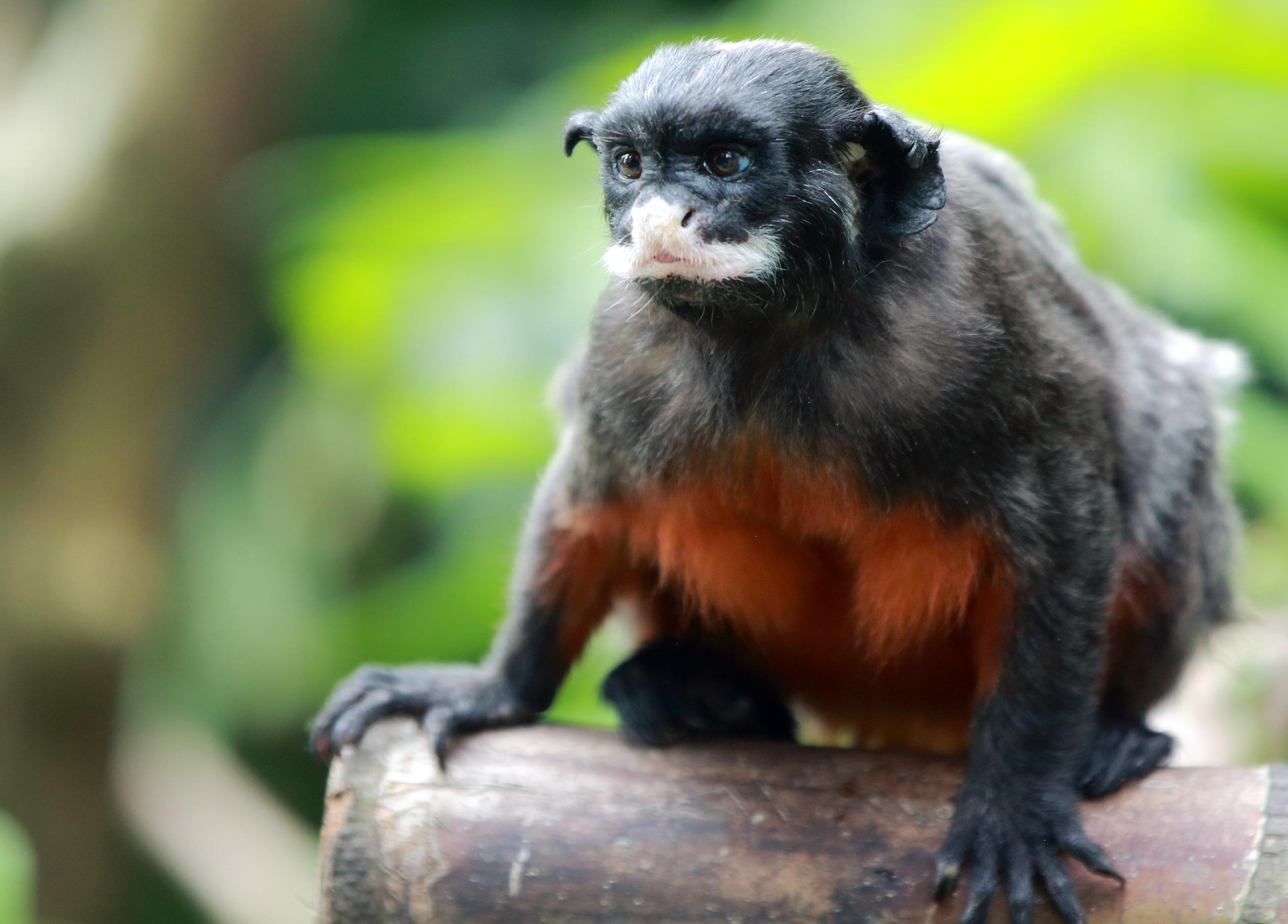
- At Singapore Zoo, Singapore

Conservation status
- Least Concern (IUCN 3.1)

Scientific classification
- Kingdom: Animalia
- Phylum: Chordata
- Class: Mammalia
- Order: Primates
- Family: Callitrichidae
- Genus: Saguinus
- Species: S. labiatus

Binomial name
- Saguinus labiatus (É. Geoffroy in Humboldt, 1812)
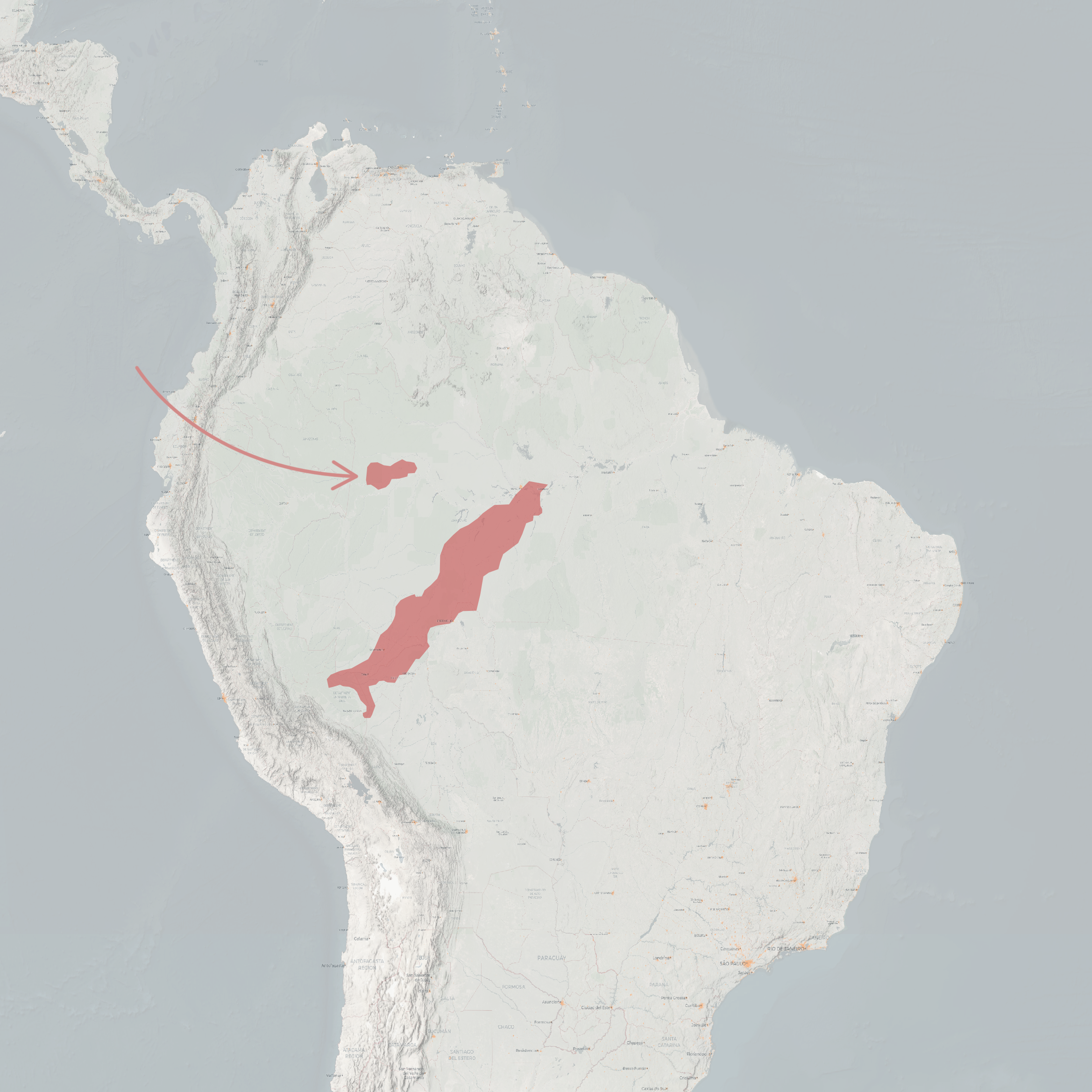
- Range of the White-lipped Tamarin

= White-lipped tamarin =

Species of New World monkey

The white-lipped tamarin (Saguinus labiatus), also known as the red-bellied tamarin, is a tamarin which lives in the Amazon area of Brazil and Bolivia.

The red belly of these New World monkeys is its most prominent characteristic. It is black with a thin white mustache on its face and a black-brown back.

They live in social groups of related animals. The mother usually gives birth to one or two young at a time. The father carries the babies most, but siblings (brothers and sisters) will also share the carrying of youngsters, and so learn how to be good carers.

There are three subspecies:

- Saguinus labiatus labiatus
- Saguinus labiatus rufiventer
- Thomas' moustached tamarin, Saguinus labiatus thomasi
