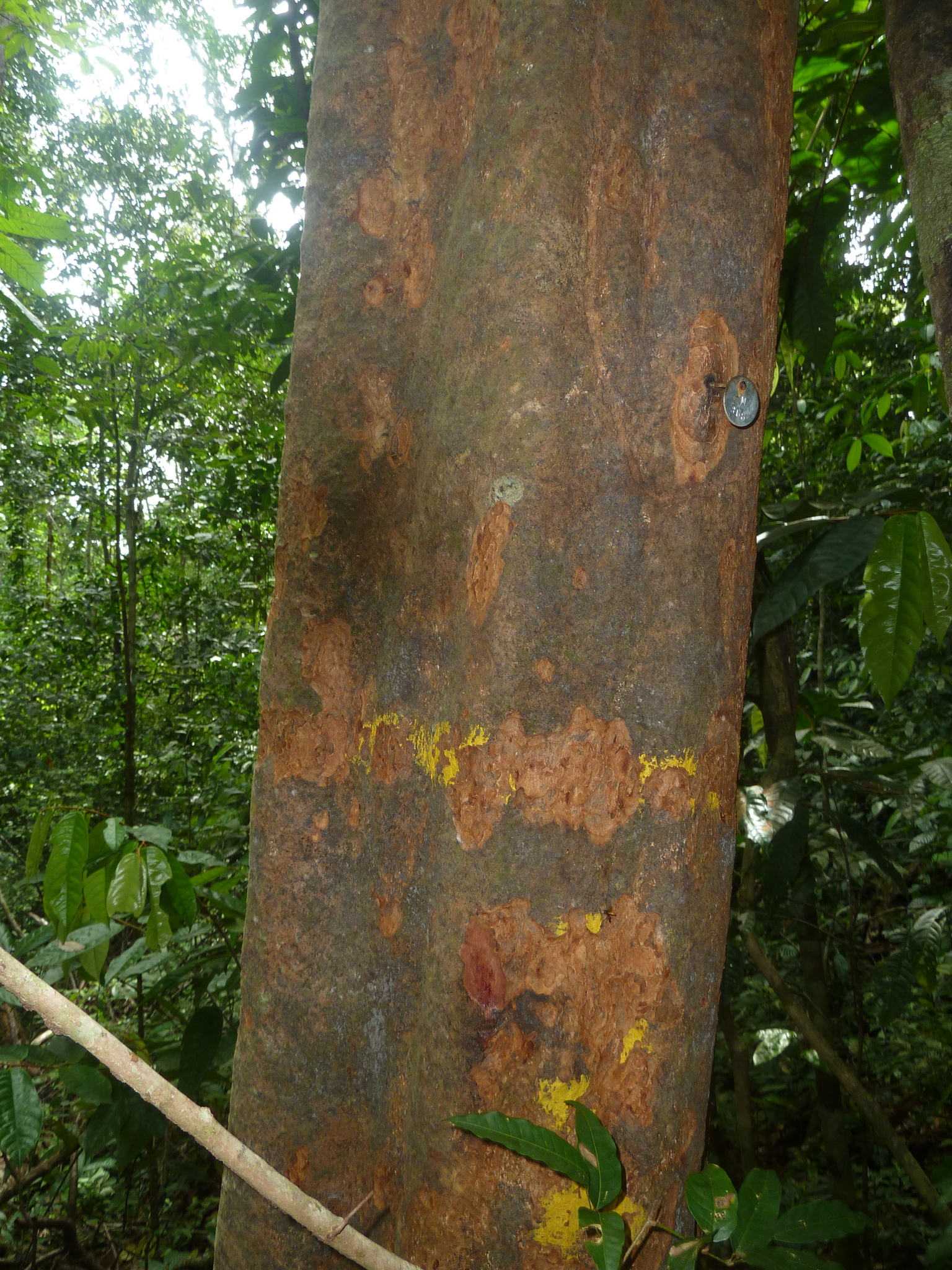

Conservation status
- Least Concern (IUCN 3.1)

Scientific classification
- Kingdom: Plantae
- Clade: Tracheophytes
- Clade: Angiosperms
- Clade: Eudicots
- Clade: Rosids
- Order: Fabales
- Family: Fabaceae
- Subfamily: Caesalpinioideae
- Clade: Mimosoid clade
- Genus: Inga
- Species: I. alba

Binomial name
- Inga alba (Sw.) Willd.

Synonyms
- Inga carachensis Pittier; Inga fraxinea Willd.; Inga spruceana Benth.; Inga thyrsoidea Desv.; Mimosa alba Sw.; Mimosa fraxinea Poir.

= Inga alba =

Species of tree

Inga alba is a species of tree from the family Fabaceae, native to Central and South America. The common name in English is white inga.

== Description ==
Inga alba can grow up to 40 m in height. It has red bark and 4 to 5 leaf pairs (occasionally 3 or 6 pairs), with the distal pair 6.1–10 cm long and 2.5—7.7 cm wide. The rachis is 5—13.5 cm long and wingless. The glands are cone-shaped, the stipules obsolete. The inflorescences are short, the shaft is 4–20 mm long and the rachis 5–8 mm long. The flowers are pale green and the stamen are white. The fruits are flat up to 14 cm long and 2 cm wide. It flowers between August and November and bears fruit between January and March.

== Distribution ==
Inga alba's distribution ranges from Mexico and Central America down to Peru, Bolivia and Brazil in South America.

== Classification ==
The species was in originally described in 1788 by Olof Swartz as Mimosa alba. It was placed in the genus Inga in 1806 by Carl Ludwig von Willdenow.
