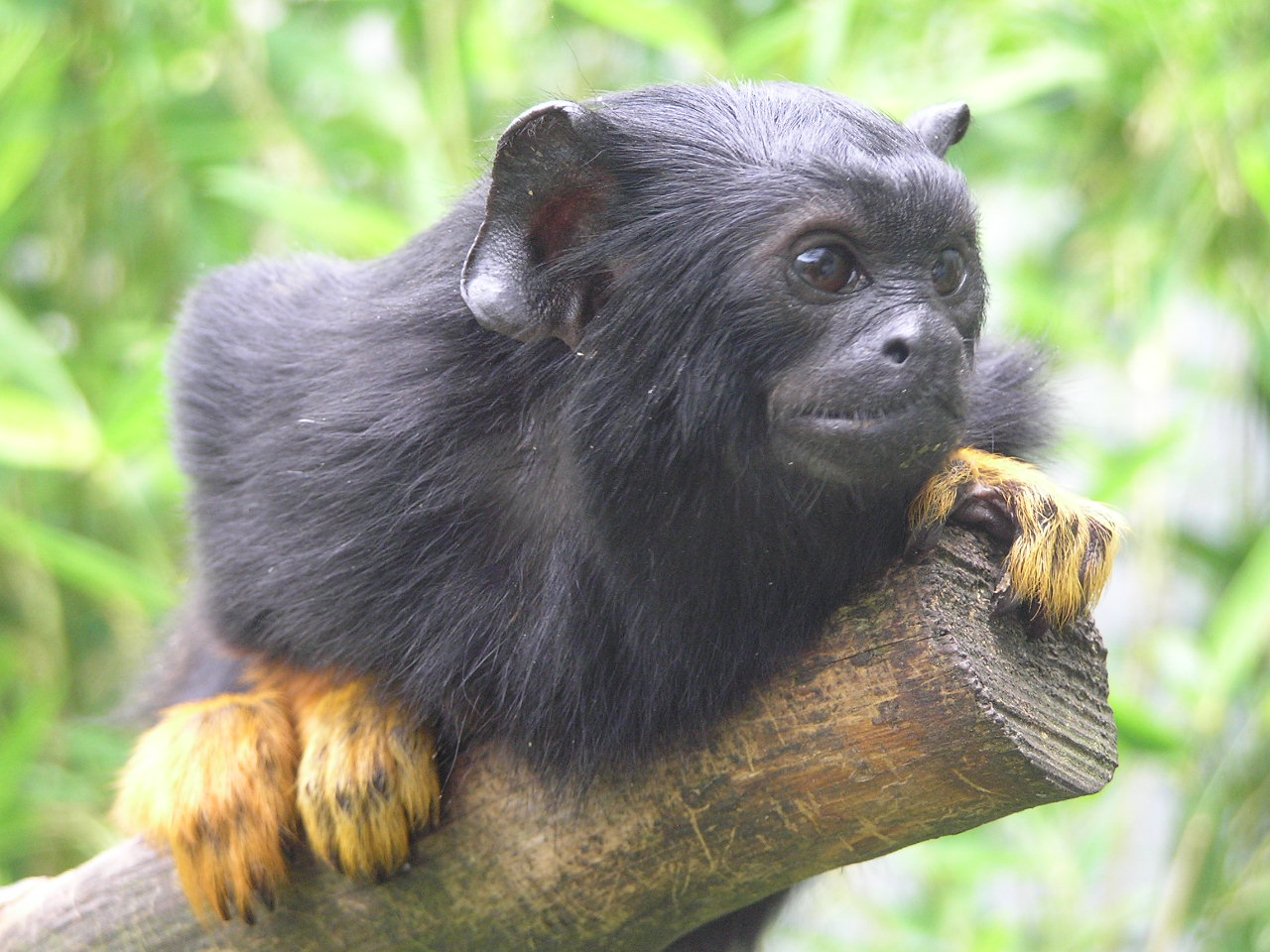
- At Parc Zoologique et Botanique de Mulhouse, France

Conservation status
- Least Concern (IUCN 3.1)

Scientific classification
- Kingdom: Animalia
- Phylum: Chordata
- Class: Mammalia
- Infraclass: Placentalia
- Order: Primates
- Family: Callitrichidae
- Genus: Saguinus
- Species: S. midas

Binomial name
- Saguinus midas (Linnaeus, 1758)
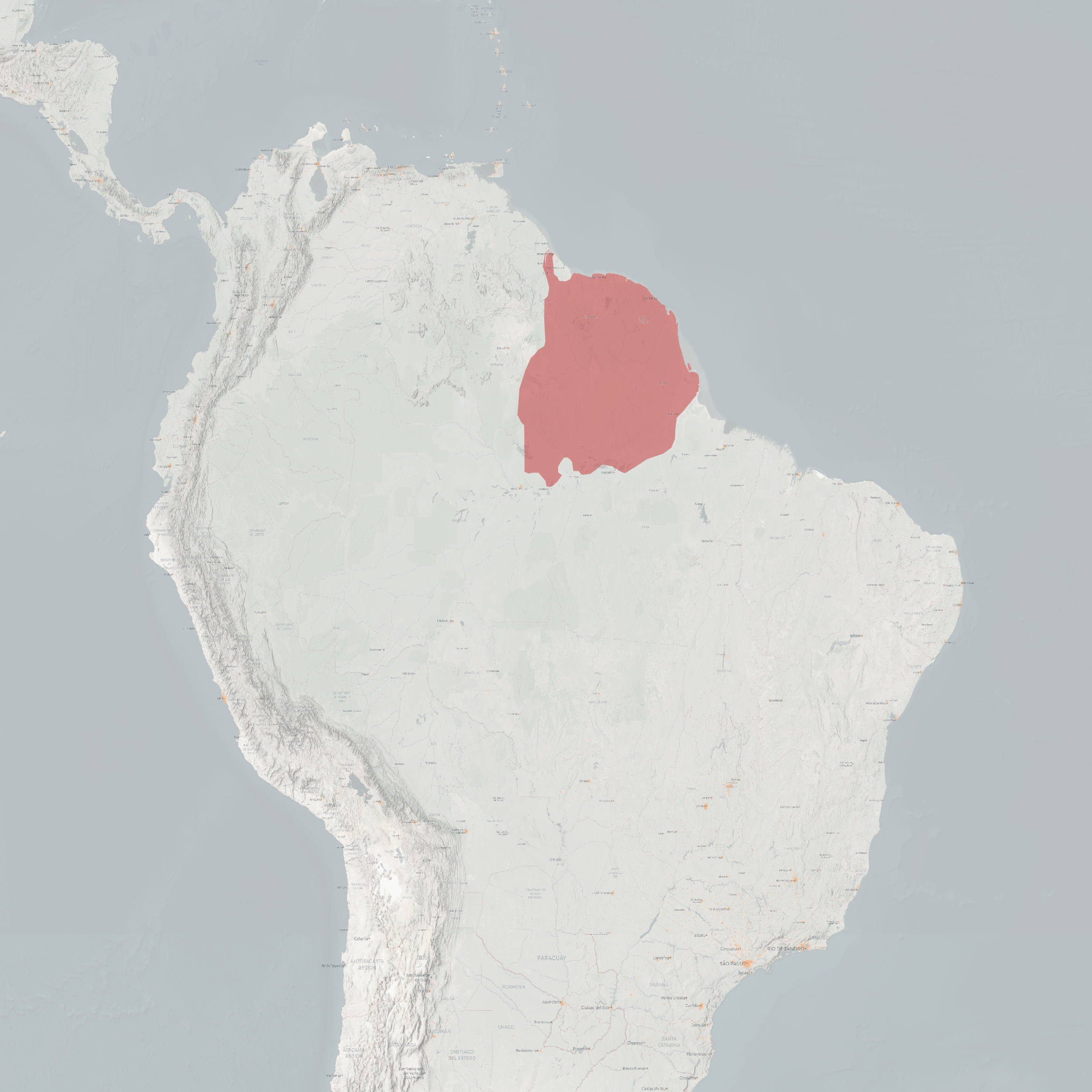
- Range of the Midas Tamarin

Synonyms
- Simia midas Linnaeus, 1758

= Golden-handed tamarin =

Species of New World monkey

The golden-handed tamarin (Saguinus midas), also known as the red-handed tamarin or Midas tamarin, is a New World monkey belonging to the family Callitrichidae.

== Distribution and habitat ==
This species is native to wooded areas north of the Amazon River in Brazil, Guyana, French Guiana, Suriname, and possibly Venezuela. A population of tamarins south of the Amazon River that lack the contrasting feet and hands was previously believed to be a sub-population of golden-handed tamarins but is now treated as a separate species, the black tamarin.

Populations of golden-handed tamarins appear to be expanding into the historical range of the pied tamarin, with the golden-handed tamarin gradually displacing the pied tamarin through interspecific competition.

This species prefers trees with small crowns.

== Description ==
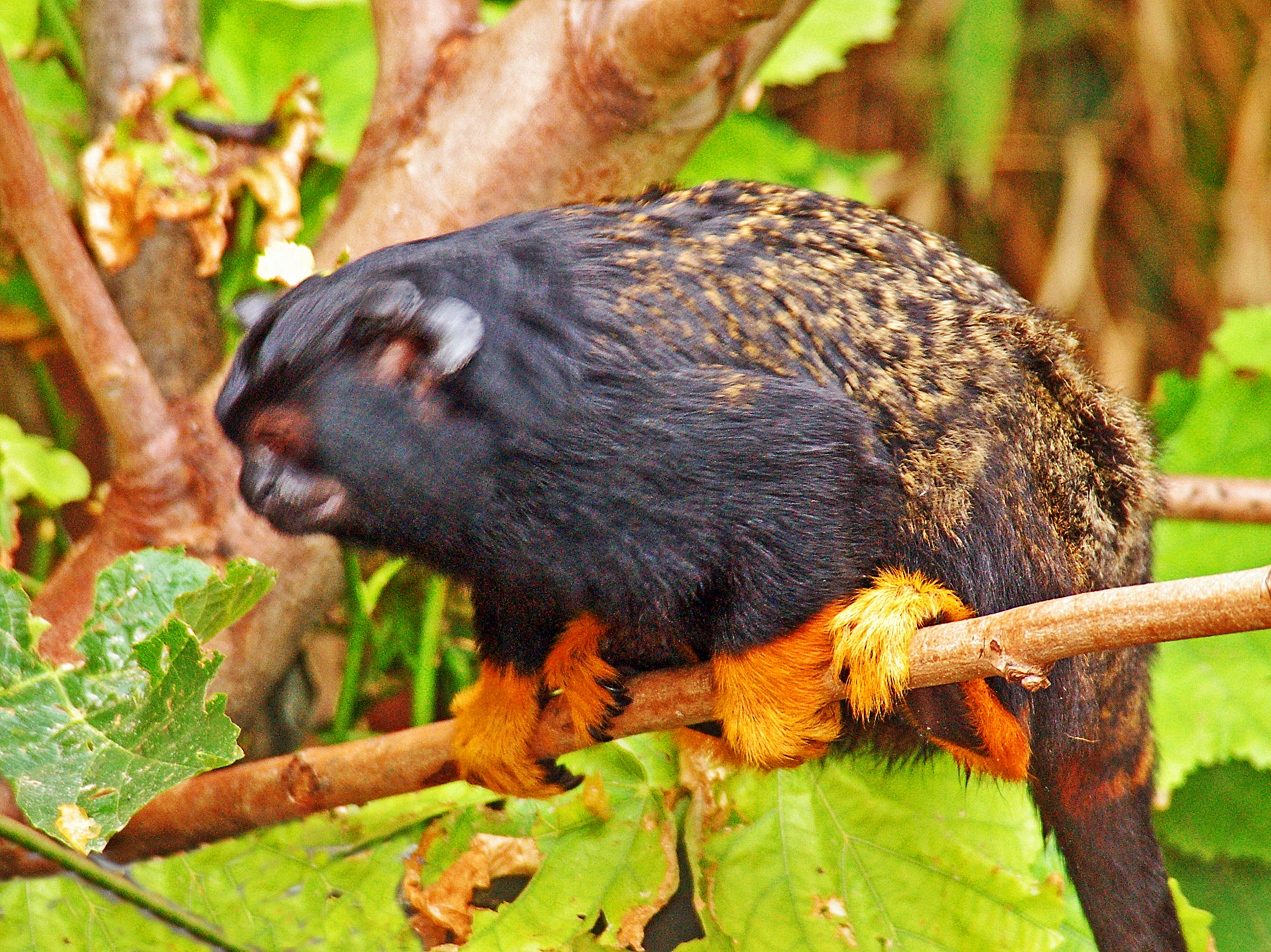
Saguinus midas

The golden-handed tamarin's body measures 20.5–28 centimetres (8.1–11.0 in); including the tail it measures 31–44 centimetres (12–17 in). It weighs 400–550 grams (0.88–1.21 lb).

The fur of the golden-handed tamarin is dark brown or black, with contrasting golden-orange hair on its feet and hands (hence the common name). The dark face is hairless; the big ears stick out of the fur. As with all marmosets, there are claws instead of nails on the fingers and toes (with the exception of the big toe). Furthermore, the thumb is not opposable.

== Biology and behavior ==
The life expectancy of Saguinus midas is approximately 10 years in the wild and 16 years in captivity. These tamarins live in cooperative groups of 4 to 15 members with little competition within group even between breeding males. Adults can reach sexual maturity aged 16–20 months. Only one female in the group will breed during breeding season with the other females suppressing the instinct. The gestation period is 140–170 days and mothers typically give birth to two offspring. Young tamarins are cared for primarily by the father and turned over to the mother only to nurse, however the entire group helps with the care of the young. Defense is a priority in a group, and when one tamarin is threatened the others will rush to its defense. The golden-handed tamarin is territorial and can be aggressive, with sharp canines and claws instead of fingernails on all fingers and all but the large toe.

The golden-handed tamarin is an exceptional climber and spends most of its time among the vines and branches of the trees. It is quick and agile and is a superb jumper known to jump distances of over 60 feet (18 m) from a tree to the ground with no sign of injury. It is an omnivore. Its diet consists of leaves, plant exudates, fruit, flowers, eggs, insects and other arthropods, frogs, spiders, lizards, and nectar. Its natural predators include small cats, birds of prey, and snakes.
