= Municipal Zoological Park Quinzinho de Barros =

Municipal Zoological Park "Quinzinho de Barros"
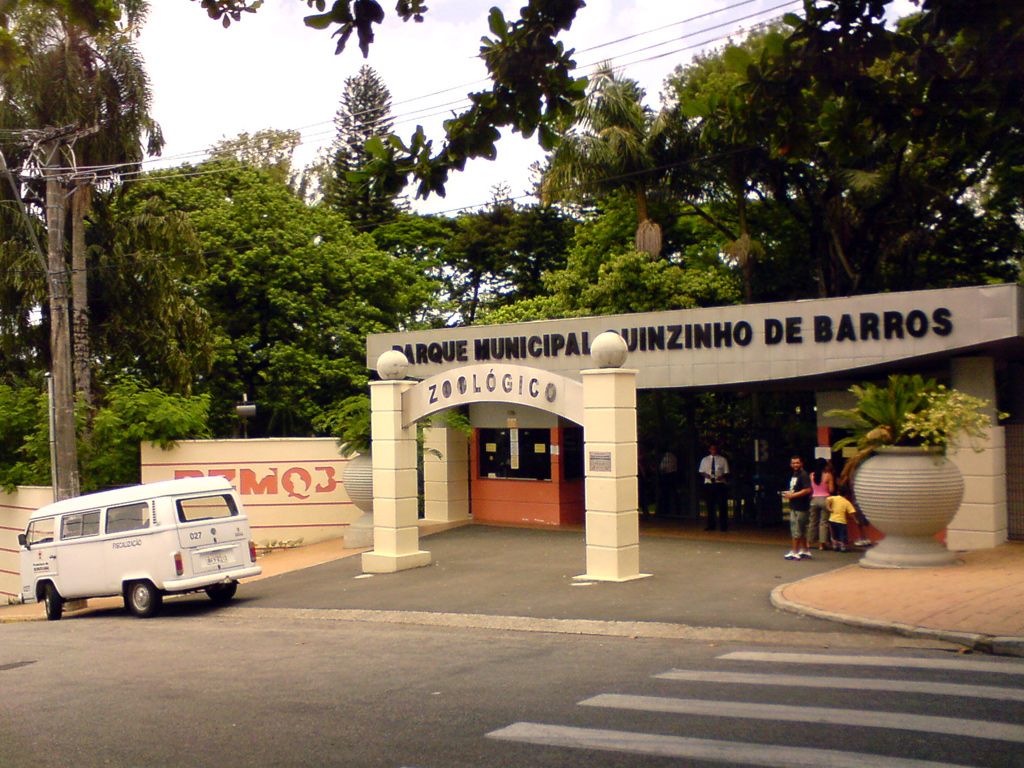
- Main entrance
- Interactive map of Municipal Zoological Park "Quinzinho de Barros"
- 23°30′21″S 47°26′17″W
- Date opened: 1968
- Location: Sorocaba, state of São Paulo, Brazil
- Land area: 15 ha (37 acres)
- No. of animals: 353 (1992)
- No. of species: 1,487 (1992)
- Annual visitors: 1 million (2007)
- Memberships: SZB
- Website: zoo.sorocaba.sp.gov.br

The Municipal Zoological Park "Quinzinho de Barros" (the City Zoo of Sorocaba) is a 15-hectare (37-acre) zoo located in the municipality of Sorocaba, state of São Paulo, Brazil. It is a member of the Society of Brazilian Zoos (SZB), and is considered Brazil's second zoo in terms of species.

The zoo lies in the Vila Hortência district, in the eastern area of the town of Sorocaba and covers an area of approximately 15 ha (37 acres). It includes a strip of transitional Atlantic Forest in its secondary stage, a lake, as well as the Historical Museum of Sorocaba. According to a survey carried out in 1992 by the Society of Brazilian Zoos, it sheltered 1,487 specimens of 353 different species of mammals, birds and reptiles at that time. 70% belonged to the Brazilian fauna; among these, 36 species were threatened by extinction.

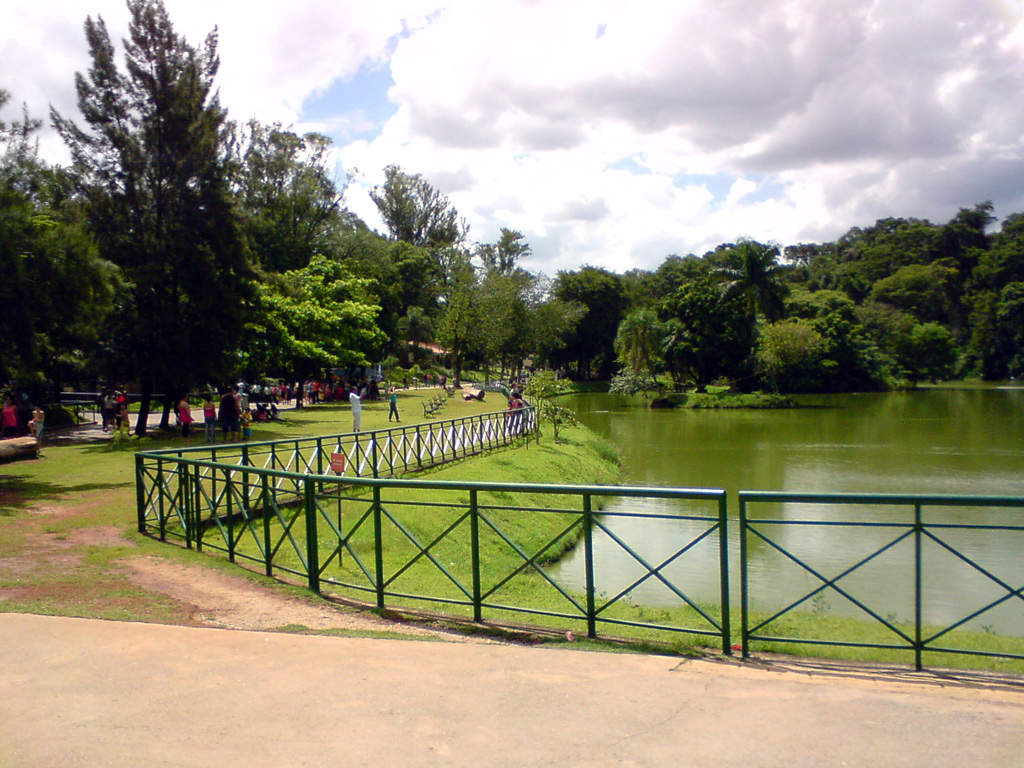
Lake with islands

Classified as "A", the highest rank granted by the Brazilian Institute of Environment and Renewable Natural Resources (IBAMA), the zoo is a reference in Latin America in terms of leisure, research, preservation, and environmental education. It attracted over one million visitors in 2007, including pupils from 81 different towns of the state of São Paulo.

Activities developed by the Zoo have been sponsored and recognized by several national and international institutions, like the Smithsonian Institution, the World Wide Fund for Nature, the U.S. Fish and Wildlife Service, among others.

== History ==
At the time of its foundation in 1654, Sorocaba featured several large squares called "largos", where makeshift stages were set up for plays, local popular festivals were held, or the donkey troops would rest at the time of the "Tropeirismo". With time, these "largos" became the city's current squares and parks.

=== Animal Garden ===
The Largo do Jardim (Garden Square) was inaugurated on 1 January 1899; its name was later changed to Praça Frei Baraúna (Frei Baraúna Square). That's where the Jardim dos Bichos (Animal Garden) was installed on 15 January 1916; it remained there until 1930 and featured species of the Brazilian fauna, like panthers, monkeys, deer, sloths, small crocodiles, snakes, and birds, especially macaws.

Around 1965, the City Hall of Sorocaba decided to develop a large area along the banks of the Sorocaba River and built a park for the local public. Some neighbors suggested including some animals to make it more attractive. As a result, several types of birds were initially installed; other varieties of birds followed, as well as two tufted capuchins and an aquarium, which gave birth to the second Jardim dos Bichos (Animal Garden); it was officially inaugurated in 1966 and called Jardim da Margem (River Bank Garden).

=== Inauguration of the "Quinzinho de Barros" Zoo ===
The Parque Zoológico Municipal Quinzinho de Barros was inaugurated on 20 October 1968 in the presence of more than 2.000 people. It was set up in the rural property Quinzinho de Barros, which belonged to the family Prestes de Barros. The city of Sorocaba had acquired it by voluntary expropriation and transferred the animals from the Jardim da Margem to that location.

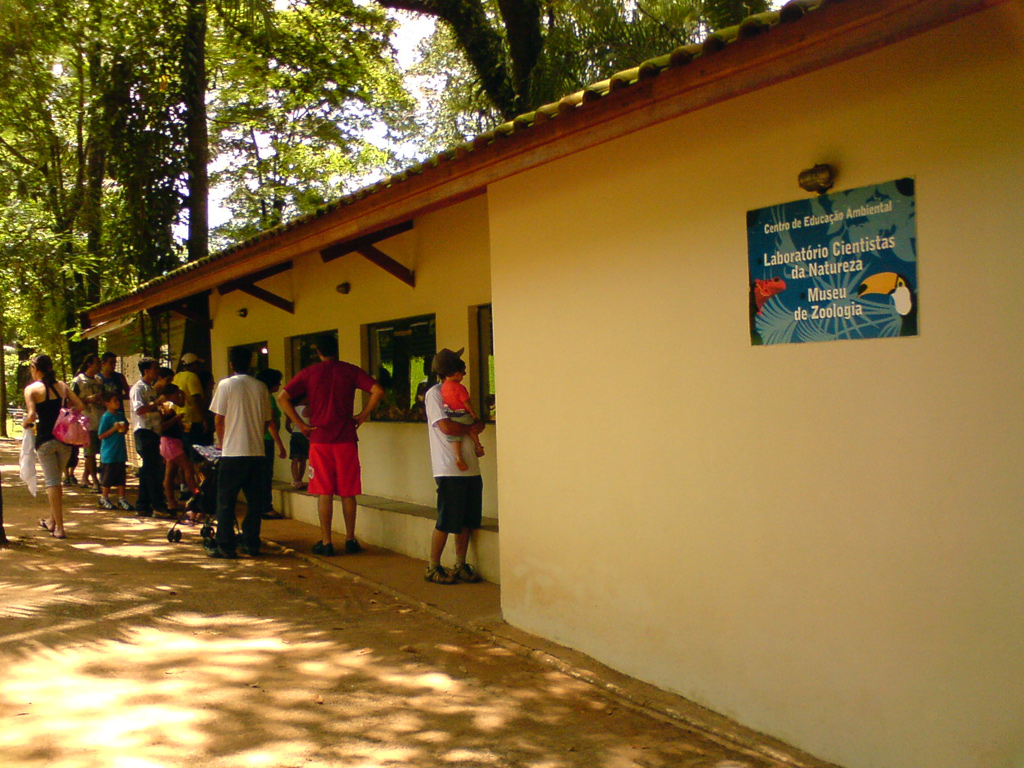
Museum of Zoology – Nature's Scientists Lab

=== Onset of educational activities ===
Quinzinho, as the local population calls it, began to offer educational activities in 1979 due to an initiative by both the Municipal Secretary of Education and Culture and the Zoo Director. As a result, the park ceased to be a mere showcase for animals and became a classroom as well.

The Environmental Education Center was set up in 1988; it comprises a specialized library on the environment which contains both technical books and books for children, a museum of zoology, a lecture hall, as well as a dormitory for trainees who come from other cities to attend courses. The Laboratório Cientistas da Natureza (Scientists of Nature Lab) was added later to make research more popular.

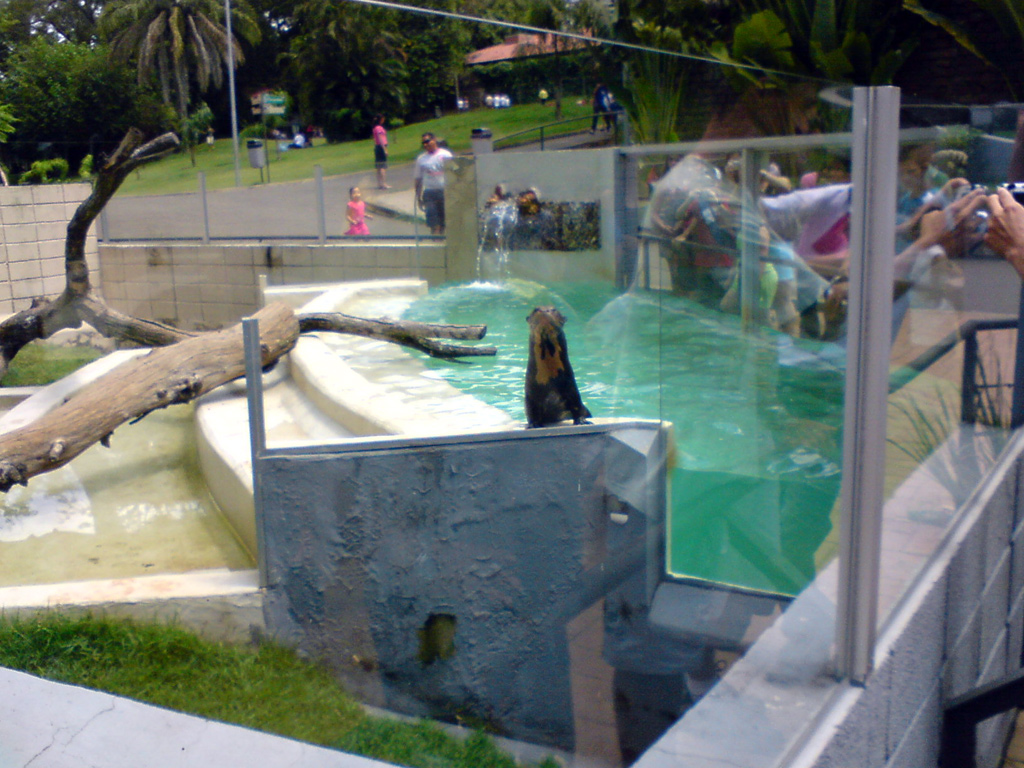
Giant otter exhibit

=== Current situation ===
The zoo was refurbished in 2004; it now includes state-of-the-art exhibition techniques, such as monkey pits, aviaries in which the visitors can watch the birds flying around them, as well as large glass panes that allow them to watch bears, the South American giant otter, and other species from a short distance.

In addition to the courses offered to biologists and veterinary surgeons from all over Brazil, the Quinzinho de Barros Municipal Zoological Park is in charge of training the São Paulo Forrest Police soldiers, sergeants, and officials.
