= List of cercopithecoids =

Species in mammal superfamily Cercopithecoidea

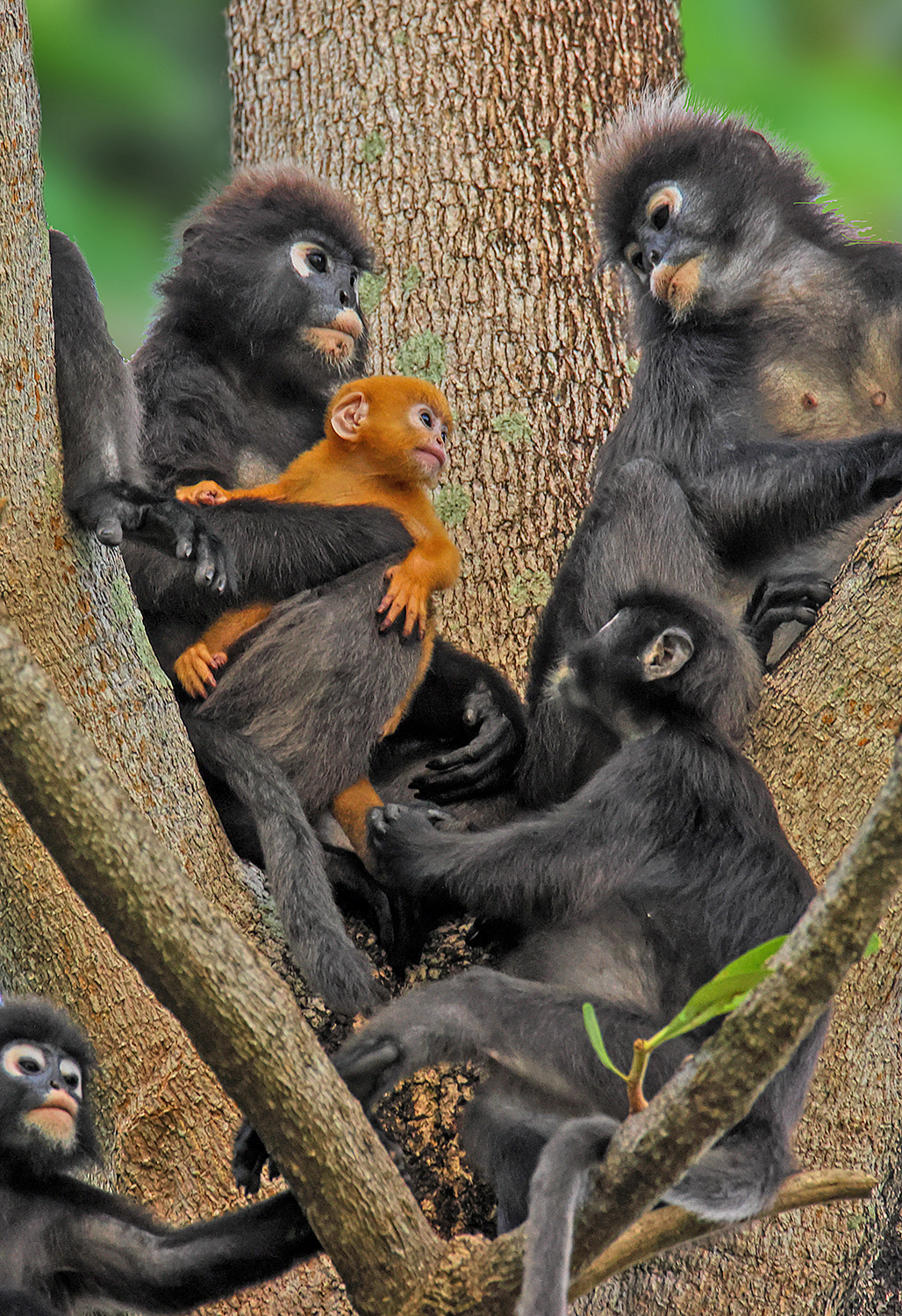
Dusky leaf monkeys (Trachypithecus obscurus)

Cercopithecoidea is a superfamily of primates. Members of this family are called cercopithecoids, or Old World monkeys, and include baboons, colobuses, guenons, lutungs, macaques, and other types of monkeys. Cercopithecoidea contains only a single family, Cercopithecidae, and includes nearly half of the species in the suborder Haplorhini, itself one of two suborders in the order Primates. Cercopithecoids are found in Asia and Africa, generally in forests, though some species can be found in shrublands, wetlands, and caves. They range in size from the Gabon talapoin, at 23 cm (9 in) plus a 31 cm (12 in) tail, to the Chacma baboon, at 115 cm (45 in) plus a 72 cm (28 in) tail. Cercopithecoids primarily eat leaves, fruit, and seeds. Most cercopithecoids do not have population estimates, but the ones that do range from 30 mature individuals to 100,000. Forty-eight species are categorized as endangered, and a further twenty-six species are categorized as critically endangered.

The 158 extant species of Cercopithecidae are divided into two subfamilies: Cercopithecinae, containing 78 baboon, guenon, macaque, and other monkey species divided between thirteen genera, and Colobinae, containing 80 colobus, lutung, and other monkey species divided between ten genera. Dozens of extinct prehistoric cercopithecoid species have been discovered, though due to ongoing research and discoveries the exact number and categorization is not fixed.

== Conventions ==
IUCN Red List categories
Conservation status
- EX: Extinct (0 species)
- EW: Extinct in the wild (0 species)
- CR: Critically endangered (26 species)
- EN: Endangered (49 species)
- VU: Vulnerable (39 species)
- NT: Near threatened (17 species)
- LC: Least concern (25 species)

Other categories
- DD: Data deficient (2 species)
- NE: Not evaluated (0 species)

The author citation for the species or genus is given after the scientific name; parentheses around the author citation indicate that this was not the original taxonomic placement. Conservation status codes listed follow the International Union for Conservation of Nature (IUCN) Red List of Threatened Species. Range maps are provided wherever possible; if a range map is not available, a description of the cercopithecoid's range is provided. Ranges are based on the IUCN Red List for that species unless otherwise noted. All extinct genera, species, or subspecies listed alongside extant species went extinct after 1500 CE, and are indicated by a dagger symbol "†".

== Classification ==
The superfamily Cercopithecoidea consists of one extant family, Cercopithecidae, which itself consists of two extant subfamilies: Cercopithecinae, containing 78 species divided into thirteen genera, and Colobinae, containing 80 species divided into ten genera.

Subfamily Cercopithecinae

- Genus Allenopithecus (Allen's swamp monkey): one species
- Genus Allochrocebus (terrestrial guenons): three species
- Genus Cercocebus (white-eyelid mangabeys): seven species
- Genus Cercopithecus (guenons): nineteen species
- Genus Chlorocebus (vervet monkeys): seven species
- Genus Erythrocebus (patas monkeys): three species
- Genus Lophocebus (crested mangabeys): two species
- Genus Macaca (macaques): twenty-four species
- Genus Mandrillus (mandrills): two species
- Genus Miopithecus (talapoins): two species
- Genus Papio (baboons): six species
- Genus Rungwecebus (kipunji): one species
- Genus Theropithecus (gelada): one species

Subfamily Colobinae

- Genus Colobus (black-and-white colobuses): five species
- Genus Nasalis (proboscis monkey): one species
- Genus Piliocolobus (red colobuses): fifteen species
- Genus Presbytis (surilis): nineteen species
- Genus Procolobus (olive colobus): one species
- Genus Pygathrix (doucs): three species
- Genus Rhinopithecus (snub-nosed monkeys): five species
- Genus Semnopithecus (gray langurs): eight species
- Genus Simias (pig-tailed langur): one species
- Genus Trachypithecus (lutungs): twenty-one species

- Cercopithecidae
  - Cercopithecinae
    - - - - - Lophocebus
            - - Papio
              - Rungwecebus
          - Theropithecus
        - - Mandrillus
          - Cercocebus
      - Macaca
    - - - - - Erythrocebus
            - Chlorocebus
          - Allochrocebus
        - Allenopithecus
      - - Miopithecus
        - Cercopithecus
  - Colobinae
    - - - - - Pygathrix
            - - Nasalis
              - Simias
          - Rhinopithecus
        - - Semnopithecus
          - Trachypithecus
      - Presbytis
    - - Colobus
      - - Piliocolobus
        - Procolobus

== Cercopithecoids ==
The following classification is based on the taxonomy described by the reference work Mammal Species of the World (2005), with augmentation by generally accepted proposals made since using molecular phylogenetic analysis, as supported by both the IUCN and the American Society of Mammalogists.

=== Subfamily Cercopithecinae ===
Genus Allenopithecus – Lang, 1923 – one species
Common name	Scientific name and subspecies	Range	Size and ecology	IUCN status and estimated population
Allen's swamp monkey	A. nigroviridis (Pocock, 1907)	Central Africa	Size: 33–51 cm (13–20 in) long, plus 35–52 cm (14–20 in) tail Habitat: Forest Diet: Fruit, leaves, and small invertebrates	LC Unknown

Genus Allochrocebus – Elliot, 1913 – three species
Common name	Scientific name and subspecies	Range	Size and ecology	IUCN status and estimated population
L'Hoest's monkey	A. lhoesti P. L. Sclater, 1899	Central Africa	Size: 31–69 cm (12–27 in) long, plus 48–10 cm (19–4 in) tail Habitat: Forest Diet: Fruit, leaves, mushrooms, and invertebrates	VU Unknown
Preuss's monkey	A. preussi Matschie, 1898 Two subspecies: C. p. insularis (Bioko Preuss's monkey); C. p. preussi (Cameroon Preuss's monkey)	West-central Africa	Size: 45–61 cm (18–24 in) long, plus 49–69 cm (19–27 in) tail Habitat: Forest and grassland Diet: Fruit, seeds, shoots, leaves, buds, flowers, and mushrooms	EN Unknown
Sun-tailed monkey	A. solatus M. J. S. Harrison, 1988	West-central Africa	Size: 45–58 cm (18–23 in) long, plus 56–76 cm (22–30 in) tail Habitat: Forest Diet: Fruit, seeds, and invertebrates	NT Unknown

Genus Cercocebus – Geoffroy, 1812 – seven species
Common name	Scientific name and subspecies	Range	Size and ecology	IUCN status and estimated population
Agile mangabey	C. agilis (H. Milne-Edwards, 1886)	Central Africa	Size: 44–65 cm (17–26 in) long, plus 45–79 cm (18–31 in) tail Habitat: Forest Diet: Fruit, seeds and shoots, as well as small vertebrates	LC Unknown
Collared mangabey	C. torquatus (Kerr, 1792)	Western Africa	Size: 45–67 cm (18–26 in) long, plus 60–75 cm (24–30 in) tail Habitat: Forest Diet: Fruit and nuts, as well as stems and roots	EN Unknown
Golden-bellied mangabey	C. chrysogaster Lydekker, 1900	Central Africa	Size: 40–80 cm (16–31 in) long, plus 45–100 cm (18–39 in) tail Habitat: Forest Diet: Invertebrates, fruit, seeds, and nectar	EN Unknown
Sanje mangabey	C. sanjei Mittermeier, 1986	East-central Africa	Size: 50–65 cm (20–26 in) long, plus 55–65 cm (22–26 in) tail Habitat: Forest Diet: Fruit, nuts, and seeds, as well as fungi, invertebrates, and plants	EN Unknown
Sooty mangabey	C. atys (Audebert, 1797)	Western Africa	Size: 40–68 cm (16–27 in) long, plus 40–80 cm (16–31 in) tail Habitat: Forest and savanna Diet: Fruit and nuts, as well as swamp plants, grass, seeds, fungi, and invertebrates	VU Unknown
Tana River mangabey	C. galeritus Peters, 1879	Eastern Africa	Size: 44–63 cm (17–25 in) long, plus 50–68 cm (20–27 in) tail Habitat: Forest, shrubland, and inland wetlands Diet: Fruit and seeds, as well as stems, leaves, insects, and fungi	CR 100–1,000
White-naped mangabey	C. lunulatus (Temminck, 1853)	Western Africa	Size: 52–73 cm (20–29 in) long, plus 68–74 cm (27–29 in) tail Habitat: Forest and inland wetlands Diet: Fruit, leaves, seeds, buds, and grass	EN Unknown

Genus Cercopithecus – Linnaeus, 1758 – nineteen species
Common name	Scientific name and subspecies	Range	Size and ecology	IUCN status and estimated population
Blue monkey	C. mitis Wolf, 1822 Sixteen subspecies: C. m. albogularis (Sykes' monkey); C. m. albotorquatus; C. m. boutourlinii (Boutourlini's blue monkey); C. m. doggetti (silver monkey); C. m. erythrarchus; C. m. heymansi (Lomami River blue monkey); C. m. kandti (golden monkey); C. m. kolbi; C. m. labiatus; C. m. manyaraensis; C. m. mitis (Pluto monkey); C. m. moloneyi; C. m. monoides; C. m. opisthostictus; C. m. stuhlmanni (Stuhlmann's blue monkey); C. m. zammaranoi	Sub-Saharan Africa	Size: 31–70 cm (12–28 in) long, plus 55–109 cm (22–43 in) tail Habitat: Forest Diet: Fruit and leaves, as well as invertebrates	LC Unknown
Campbell's mona monkey	C. campbelli Waterhouse, 1838	Western Africa	Size: 36–55 cm (14–22 in) long, plus 49–85 cm (19–33 in) tail Habitat: Forest, savanna, and shrubland Diet: Fruit, leaves, seeds and grains, as well as birds, bird eggs, small reptiles, and insects	NT Unknown
Crested mona monkey	C. pogonias Bennett, 1833 Three subspecies: C. p. grayi (Gray's crested mona); C. p. nigripes (Black-footed crested mona); C. p. pogonias (Golden-bellied crested mona)	Central Africa	Size: 34–55 cm (13–22 in) long, plus 48–87 cm (19–34 in) tail Habitat: Forest Diet: Fruit and seeds, as well as leaves, flowers and insects	NT Unknown
De Brazza's monkey	C. neglectus Schlegel, 1876	Central Africa	Size: 39–60 cm (15–24 in) long, plus 47–79 cm (19–31 in) tail Habitat: Inland wetlands and forest Diet: Fruit, as well as leaves, flowers, mushrooms, beetles, termites, and worms	LC Unknown
Dent's mona monkey	C. denti Thomas, 1907	Central Africa	Size: 40–70 cm (16–28 in) long, plus 70–90 cm (28–35 in) tail Habitat: Forest Diet: Fruit and arthropods, as well as flowers, caterpillars, shoots, and leaves	LC Unknown
Diana monkey	C. diana (Linnaeus, 1758)	Western Africa	Size: 40–55 cm (16–22 in) long, plus 50–75 cm (20–30 in) tail Habitat: Forest Diet: Fruit, flowers, leaves, insects, and other invertebrates	EN Unknown
Greater spot-nosed monkey	C. nictitans (Linnaeus, 1766) Five subspecies: C. n. insolitus; C. n. ludio; C. n. martini; C. n. nictitans; C. n. stampflii	Western Africa	Size: 40–57 cm (16–22 in) long, plus 56–100 cm (22–39 in) tail Habitat: Forest Diet: Fruits and seeds, as well as leaves and insects	NT Unknown
Hamlyn's monkey	C. hamlyni Pocock, 1907 Two subspecies: C. h. hamlyni; C. h. kahuziensis	Central Africa	Size: 43–63 cm (17–25 in) long, plus 49–63 cm (19–25 in) tail Habitat: Forest Diet: Shoots, leaves, plants, and herbs, as well as fruit and seeds	VU Unknown
Lesser spot-nosed monkey	C. petaurista (Schreber, 1774) Two subspecies: C. p. buettikoferi; C. p. petaurista	Western Africa	Size: 29–53 cm (11–21 in) long, plus 57–78 cm (22–31 in) tail Habitat: Forest Diet: Fruit as well as insects	NT Unknown
Lesula	C. lomamiensis Hart et al., 2012	Central Africa	Size: 40–65 cm (16–26 in) long, plus 40–65 cm (16–26 in) tail Habitat: Forest Diet: Leaves, fruits and flowers	VU Unknown
Lowe's mona monkey	C. lowei Thomas, 1923	Western Africa (in green)	Size: 36–55 cm (14–22 in) long, plus 54–85 cm (21–33 in) tail Habitat: Forest and savanna Diet: Fruit and insects	VU 10,000
Mona monkey	C. mona (Schreber, 1774)	Western Africa	Size: 32–53 cm (13–21 in) long, plus 67–90 cm (26–35 in) tail Habitat: Forest Diet: Fruit, sprouts, leaves, and invertebrates	NT Unknown
Moustached guenon	C. cephus (Linnaeus, 1758) Three subspecies: C. c. cephodes; C. c. cephus; C. c. ngottoensis	Western Africa	Size: 44–60 cm (17–24 in) long, plus 66–99 cm (26–39 in) tail Habitat: Forest Diet: Fruit, as well as seeds, leaves, insects, and eggs	LC Unknown
Red-eared guenon	C. erythrotis Waterhouse, 1838 Two subspecies: C. e. camerunensis (Cameroon Red-eared Monkey); C. e. erythrotis (Bioko Red-eared Monkey)	Western Africa	Size: 36–55 cm (14–22 in) long, plus 46–77 cm (18–30 in) tail Habitat: Forest Diet: Fruit, as well as leaves, shoots and arthropods	VU Unknown
Red-tailed monkey	C. ascanius (Audebert, 1799) Five subspecies: C. a. ascanius; C. a. atrinasus; C. a. katangae; C. a. schmidti; C. a. whitesidei	Central Africa	Size: 34–55 cm (13–22 in) long, plus 67–92 cm (26–36 in) tail Habitat: Forest Diet: Fruit, as well as leaves, insects, flowers, buds, and tree gum	LC Unknown
Roloway monkey	C. roloway (Schreber, 1774)	Western Africa	Size: 44–62 cm (17–24 in) long, plus 70–91 cm (28–36 in) tail Habitat: Forest Diet: Insects, as well as seeds, fruit, and leaves	CR Unknown
Sclater's guenon	C. sclateri Pocock, 1904	Western Africa	Size: 32–38 cm (13–15 in) long, plus 61–85 cm (24–33 in) tail Habitat: Forest Diet: Fruit, as well as insects, flowers and leaves	EN Unknown
White-throated guenon	C. erythrogaster Gray, 1866 Two subspecies: C. e. erythrogaster (Red-bellied guenon); C. e. pococki (Nigerian white-throated guenon)	Western Africa	Size: 38–46 cm (15–18 in) long, plus 58–70 cm (23–28 in) tail Habitat: Forest and inland wetlands Diet: Fruit	EN Unknown
Wolf's mona monkey	C. wolfi (Meyer, 1891) Three subspecies: C. w. elegans; C. w. pyrogaster; C. w. wolfi	Central Africa	Size: 44–52 cm (17–20 in) long, plus 69–83 cm (27–33 in) tail Habitat: Forest Diet: Fruit, leaves, seeds, and flowers	NT Unknown

Genus Chlorocebus – Gray, 1870 – seven species
Common name	Scientific name and subspecies	Range	Size and ecology	IUCN status and estimated population
Bale Mountains vervet	C. djamdjamensis Neumann, 1902 Two subspecies: C. d. djamdjamensis; C. d. harennaensis	Eastern Africa	Size: 43–45 cm (17–18 in) long, plus 47–50 cm (19–20 in) tail Habitat: Forest Diet: Leaves and fruit, as well as flowers, small vertebrates, shoots, stems, and roots	VU Unknown
Dryas monkey	C. dryas (Schwarz, 1932)	Central Africa	Size: 36–40 cm (14–16 in) long, plus 48–52 cm (19–20 in) tail Habitat: Forest Diet: Fruit, leaves, shoots, pith, seeds, insects, and mushrooms	EN 100–250
Green monkey	C. sabaeus (Linnaeus, 1766)	Western Africa	Size: 42–46 cm (17–18 in) long, plus 42–72 cm (17–28 in) tail Habitat: Forest and savanna Diet: Fruit and leaves	LC Unknown
Grivet	C. aethiops (Linnaeus, 1758) Two subspecies: C. a. aethiops; C. a. matschiei	Eastern Africa	Size: 40–60 cm (16–24 in) long, plus 30–50 cm (12–20 in) tail Habitat: Savanna and shrubland Diet: Fruit, insects, and vegetable matter, as well as small mammals and birds	LC Unknown
Malbrouck	C. cynosuros (Scopoli, 1786)	Southern Africa	Size: 34–70 cm (13–28 in) long, plus 44–79 cm (17–31 in) tail Habitat: Forest and savanna Diet: Fruit, as well as shoots, stems, gum, and seeds	LC Unknown
Tantalus monkey	C. tantalus (Ogilby, 1841) Three subspecies: C. t. budgetti; C. t. marrensis; C. t. tantalus	Equatorial Africa	Size: 38–83 cm (15–33 in) long, plus 55–114 cm (22–45 in) tail Habitat: Forest and savanna Diet: Fruit, buds, seeds, roots, bark, and gum, as well as insects, small vertebrates and eggs	LC Unknown
Vervet monkey	C. pygerythrus F. Cuvier, 1821 Five subspecies: C. p. hilgerti; C. p. nesiotes; C. p. pygerythrus; C. p. rufoviridis; C. p. zavattarii	Eastern and southern Africa	Size: 42–57 cm (17–22 in) long, plus 48–75 cm (19–30 in) tail Habitat: Savanna, shrubland, and forest Diet: Leaves, flowers, fruit, seeds, arthropods, and gum	LC Unknown

Genus Erythrocebus – Trouessart, 1897 – three species
Common name	Scientific name and subspecies	Range	Size and ecology	IUCN status and estimated population
Blue Nile patas monkey	E. poliophaeus Reichenbach, 1862	Eastern Africa	Size: 49–64 cm (19–25 in) long, plus 43–73 cm (17–29 in) tail Habitat: Forest, savanna, and shrubland Diet: Gum and arthropods, as well as flowers, fruit, seeds, leaves, stems, roots, and small vertebrates	DD Unknown
Common patas monkey	E. patas (Schreber, 1775) Three subspecies: E. p. patas; E. p. pyrrhonotus; E. p. villiersi	Equatorial Africa	Size: 50–70 cm (20–28 in) long, plus 50–70 cm (20–28 in) tail Habitat: Forest, savanna, shrubland, and grassland Diet: Fruit and insects, as well as leaves, roots, and bird eggs	NT Unknown
Southern patas monkey	E. baumstarki Matschie, 1905	Eastern Africa	Size: 49–64 cm (19–25 in) long, plus 43–73 cm (17–29 in) tail Habitat: Forest, savanna, shrubland, and grassland Diet: Gum and arthropods, as well as flowers, fruit, seeds, leaves, stems, roots, and small vertebrates	CR 100

Genus Lophocebus – Palmer, 1903 – two species
Common name	Scientific name and subspecies	Range	Size and ecology	IUCN status and estimated population
Black crested mangabey	L. aterrimus (Oudemans, 1890) Two subspecies: L. a. aterrimus; L. a. opdenboschi	Central Africa	Size: 45–65 cm (18–26 in) long, plus 80–85 cm (31–33 in) tail Habitat: Forest Diet: Fruit	VU Unknown
Grey-cheeked mangabey	L. albigena (Gray, 1850) Four subspecies: L. a. albigena; L. a. johnstoni; L. a. osmani; L. a. ugandae	Central Africa	Size: 44–75 cm (17–30 in) long, plus 57–94 cm (22–37 in) tail Habitat: Forest Diet: Fruit and seeds	VU Unknown

Genus Macaca – Lacépède, 1799 – 24 species
Common name	Scientific name and subspecies	Range	Size and ecology	IUCN status and estimated population
Toque macaque	M. sinica (Linnaeus, 1771) Three subspecies: M. s. aurifrons (Pale-fronted toque macaque); M. s. opisthomelas (Highland toque macaque); M. s. sinica (Common toque macaque)	Sri Lanka	Size: 36–53 cm (14–21 in) long, plus at least 36–53 cm (14–21 in) tail Habitat: Forest Diet: Fruit as well as tree flowers, buds, and leaves	EN Unknown
Arunachal macaque	M. munzala Sinha, Datta, Madhusudan, Mishra, 2005	Eastern Himalayas	Size: 36–77 cm (14–30 in) long, plus about 9–20 cm (4–8 in) tail Habitat: Forest Diet: Fruit, leaves, grains, buds, seeds, flowers, and bark, as well as insects and small invertebrates	EN 250
Assam macaque	M. assamensis McClelland, 1840 Two subspecies: M. a. assamensis (Eastern Assamese macaque); M. a. pelops (Western Assamese macaque)	Southeastern Asia	Size: 36–77 cm (14–30 in) long, plus about 9–20 cm (4–8 in) tail Habitat: Forest Diet: Fruit, leaves, grains, buds, seeds, flowers, and bark, as well as insects and small invertebrates	NT Unknown
Barbary macaque	M. sylvanus (Linnaeus, 1758)	Northwestern Africa	Size: 45–60 cm (18–24 in) long, plus 1–2 cm (0–1 in) tail Habitat: Forest, shrubland, grassland, rocky areas, and caves Diet: Plants, caterpillars, fruit, seeds, roots, and fungi	EN Unknown
Bonnet macaque	M. radiata (Geoffroy, 1812) Two subspecies: M. r. diluta; M. r. radiata	Southern India	Size: 36–77 cm (14–30 in) long, plus about 9–20 cm (4–8 in) tail Habitat: Forest, savanna, and shrubland Diet: Fruit, foliage, and insects, as well as bird eggs and lizards	VU Unknown
Booted macaque	M. ochreata (Ogilby, 1841)	Island of Sulawesi in Indonesia	Size: 36–77 cm (14–30 in) long, plus about 1–15 cm (0–6 in) tail Habitat: Forest and savanna Diet: Fruit, leaves, grains, buds, seeds, flowers, and bark, as well as insects and small invertebrates	VU Unknown
Celebes crested macaque	M. nigra (Desmarest, 1822)	Island of Sulawesi	Size: 44–57 cm (17–22 in) long, plus about 2 cm (1 in) tail Habitat: Forest Diet: Fruit, as well as insects, shoots, leaves, and stems	CR Unknown
Crab-eating macaque	M. fascicularis Raffles, 1821 Ten subspecies: M. f. atriceps (Dark-crowned long-tailed macaque); M. f. aureus (Burmese long-tailed macaque); M. f. condorensis (Con Song long-tailed macaque); M. f. fascicularis (Common long-tailed macaque); M. f. fusca (Simeulue long-tailed macaque); M. f. karimondjawae (Kemujan long-tailed macaque); M. f. lasiae (Lasia long-tailed macaque); M. f. philippensis (Philippine long-tailed macaque); M. f. tua (Maratua long-tailed macaque); M. f. umbrosus (Nicobar long-tailed macaque)	Southeastern Asia	Size: 40–47 cm (16–19 in) long, plus 50–60 cm (20–24 in) tail Habitat: Forest, intertidal marine, caves, inland wetlands, grassland, shrubland, and savanna Diet: Fruit, crabs, flowers, insects, leaves, fungi, grasses, and clay	EN Unknown
Formosan rock macaque	M. cyclopis (Swinhoe, 1862)	Taiwan	Size: 36–45 cm (14–18 in) long, plus 26–46 cm (10–18 in) tail Habitat: Forest Diet: Fruit, leaves, berries, seeds, insects, and small vertebrates, buds, and shoots	LC Unknown
Gorontalo macaque	M. nigrescens (Temminck, 1849)	Island of Sulawesi	Size: 36–77 cm (14–30 in) long, plus about 1–15 cm (0–6 in) tail Habitat: Forest Diet: Fruit, leaves, grains, buds, seeds, flowers, and bark, as well as insects and small invertebrates	VU Unknown
Heck's macaque	M. hecki (Matschie, 1901)	Island of Sulawesi	Size: 36–77 cm (14–30 in) long, plus about 1–15 cm (0–6 in) tail Habitat: Forest and grassland Diet: Fruit, leaves, grains, buds, seeds, flowers, and bark, as well as insects and small invertebrates	VU 100,000
Japanese macaque	M. fuscata Blyth, 1875 Two subspecies: M. f. fuscata; M. f. yakui (Yakushima macaque)	Japan	Size: 36–77 cm (14–30 in) long, plus about 1–15 cm (0–6 in) tail Habitat: Forest Diet: Fruit, seeds, flowers, nectar, leaves, and fungi	LC Unknown
Lion-tailed macaque	M. silenus (Linnaeus, 1758)	Southwestern India	Size: 40–61 cm (16–24 in) long, plus 24–38 cm (9–15 in) tail Habitat: Forest Diet: Fruit, as well as leaves, stems, flowers, buds, fungi, insects, lizards, tree frogs, and small mammals	EN 2,400–2,500
Moor macaque	M. maura (Schinz, 1825)	Island of Sulawesi	Size: 36–77 cm (14–30 in) long, plus about 1–15 cm (0–6 in) tail Habitat: Forest and grassland Diet: Fruit, leaves, grains, buds, seeds, flowers, and bark, as well as insects and small invertebrates	EN Unknown
Muna-Buton macaque	M. brunnescens (Matschie, 1901)	Island of Sulawesi in Indonesia	Size: 36–77 cm (14–30 in) long, plus about 1–15 cm (0–6 in) tail Habitat: Forest Diet: Fruit, leaves, grains, buds, seeds, flowers, and bark, as well as insects and small invertebrates	VU Unknown
Northern pig-tailed macaque	M. leonina (Blyth, 1863)	Southeastern Asia	Size: 36–77 cm (14–30 in) long, plus about 9–20 cm (4–8 in) tail Habitat: Forest Diet: Leaves, seeds, stems, roots, flowers, bamboo shoots, rice, gums, insects, larvae, termite eggs and spiders	VU Unknown
Pagai Island macaque	M. pagensis (Miller, 1903)	Mentawai Islands in Indonesia	Size: 36–77 cm (14–30 in) long, plus about 9–20 cm (4–8 in) tail Habitat: Forest Diet: Fruit, leaves, grains, buds, seeds, flowers, and bark, as well as insects and small invertebrates	CR 2,100–3,700
Rhesus macaque	M. mulatta (Zimmermann, 1790)	Southern and southeastern Asia	Size: 45–64 cm (18–25 in) long, plus 19–32 cm (7–13 in) tail Habitat: Forest, savanna, and shrubland Diet: Fish, crabs, shellfish, bird eggs, honeycombs, crayfish, crabs, spiders, plants, gums and pith	LC Unknown
Siberut macaque	M. siberu Fuentes, 1995	Siberut island in Indonesia	Size: 36–77 cm (14–30 in) long, plus about 9–20 cm (4–8 in) tail Habitat: Forest Diet: Fruit, as well as mushrooms, leaves, crabs, crayfish, pith, sap, shoots and flowers	EN Unknown
Southern pig-tailed macaque	M. nemestrina (Linnaeus, 1766)	Southeastern Asia	Size: 46–57 cm (18–22 in) long, plus 13–26 cm (5–10 in) tail Habitat: Forest and shrubland Diet: Fruit, insects, seeds, leaves, dirt, and fungus, as well as birds, termite eggs and larvae, and river crabs	EN Unknown
Stump-tailed macaque	M. arctoides (Geoffroy, 1831)	Southeastern Asia	Size: 48–65 cm (19–26 in) long, plus 3–7 cm (1–3 in) tail Habitat: Forest Diet: Fruit, seeds, flowers, roots, leaves, frogs, crabs, birds, and bird eggs	VU Unknown
Tibetan macaque	M. thibetana (H. Milne-Edwards, 1870) Four subspecies: M. t. esau; M. t. guiahouensis; M. t. huangshanensis; M. t. thibetana	East China	Size: 36–77 cm (14–30 in) long, plus about 1–15 cm (0–6 in) tail Habitat: Forest and caves Diet: Fruit, as well as flowers, berries, seeds, leaves, stems, stalks, and invertebrates	NT Unknown
Tonkean macaque	M. tonkeana (von Meyer, 1899)	Island of Sulawesi	Size: 36–77 cm (14–30 in) long, plus about 1–15 cm (0–6 in) tail Habitat: Forest Diet: Fruit, leaves, grains, buds, seeds, flowers, and bark, as well as insects and small invertebrates	VU Unknown
White-cheeked macaque	M. leucogenys Li, Zhao, Fan, 2015	Northeastern India	Size: 36–77 cm (14–30 in) long, plus about 9–20 cm (4–8 in) tail Habitat: Forest Diet: Fruit, leaves, grains, buds, seeds, flowers, and bark, as well as insects and small invertebrates	EN Unknown

Genus Mandrillus – Ritgen, 1824 – two species
Common name	Scientific name and subspecies	Range	Size and ecology	IUCN status and estimated population
Drill	M. leucophaeus (F. Cuvier, 1807) Two subspecies: M. l. leucophaeus (Mainland drill); M. l. poensis (Bioko drill)	Western Africa	Size: 61–77 cm (24–30 in) long, plus 5–8 cm (2–3 in) tail Habitat: Forest, savanna, and rocky areas Diet: Omnivorous, primarily fruit and seeds	EN 4,000
Mandrill	M. sphinx (Linnaeus, 1758)	Western Africa	Size: 55–95 cm (22–37 in) long, plus 7–10 cm (3–4 in) tail Habitat: Forest Diet: Fruit, seeds, fungi, roots, insects, snails, worms, frogs, and lizards, as well as snakes and small vertebrates	VU Unknown

Genus Miopithecus – Geoffroy, 1842 – two species
Common name	Scientific name and subspecies	Range	Size and ecology	IUCN status and estimated population
Angolan talapoin	M. talapoin (Schreber, 1774)	Western Africa	Size: 32–45 cm (13–18 in) long, plus 36–53 cm (14–21 in) tail Habitat: Forest and inland wetlands Diet: Insects, leaves, seeds, fruit, water plants, grubs, eggs, and small vertebrates	VU Unknown
Gabon talapoin	M. ogouensis Kingdon, 1997	Western Africa	Size: 23–36 cm (9–14 in) long, plus 31–45 cm (12–18 in) tail Habitat: Forest Diet: Fruit, seeds and insects	NT Unknown

Genus Papio – Erxleben, 1777 – six species
Common name	Scientific name and subspecies	Range	Size and ecology	IUCN status and estimated population
Chacma baboon	P. ursinus (Kerr, 1792) Three subspecies: P. u. griseipes (Gray-footed chacma); P. u. ruacana (Ruacana chacma); P. u. ursinus (Cape chacma)	Southern Africa	Size: 50–115 cm (20–45 in) long, plus 45–72 cm (18–28 in) tail Habitat: Forest, savanna, shrubland, grassland, rocky areas, and desert Diet: Fruit, leaves, gum, insects, eggs, seeds, flowers, grass, roots, tubers, and small vertebrates	LC Unknown
Guinea baboon	P. papio (Desmarest, 1820)	Western Africa	Size: 50–115 cm (20–45 in) long, plus 45–72 cm (18–28 in) tail Habitat: Forest, savanna, grassland, and inland wetlands Diet: Roots, tubers, bulbs, corms, small vertebrates, fruit, and seeds	NT Unknown
Hamadryas baboon	P. hamadryas (Linnaeus, 1758)	Horn of Africa and southwestern Arabian Peninsula	Size: 61–77 cm (24–30 in) long, plus 38–61 cm (15–24 in) tail Habitat: Shrubland, grassland, and rocky areas Diet: Fruit, gum, insects, eggs, seeds, flowers, grass, rhizomes, corms, roots, tubers, and small vertebrates	LC Unknown
Kinda baboon	P. kindae Lönnberg, 1919	Central Africa (in green)	Size: 55–84 cm (22–33 in) long, plus 38–66 cm (15–26 in) tail Habitat: Forest, savanna, and shrubland Diet: Omnivorous; primarily fruit	LC Unknown
Olive baboon	P. anubis (Lesson, 1827)	Equatorial Africa	Size: 61–84 cm (24–33 in) long, plus 31–60 cm (12–24 in) tail Habitat: Forest, savanna, shrubland, and grassland Diet: Fruit, gums, insects, eggs, seeds, flowers, grass, rhizomes, corms, roots, tubers, and small vertebrates	LC Unknown
Yellow baboon	P. cynocephalus (Linnaeus, 1766) Two subspecies: P. c. cynocephalus (Common yellow baboon); P. c. ibeanus (Ibean baboon)	Eastern Africa (in red)	Size: 50–115 cm (20–45 in) long, plus 45–72 cm (18–28 in) tail Habitat: Shrubland, savanna, and forest Diet: Grass, sedges, seeds, fruit, roots, leaves, buds, bark, flowers, insects, and small vertebrates	LC Unknown

Genus Rungwecebus – Davenport, 2006 – one species
Common name	Scientific name and subspecies	Range	Size and ecology	IUCN status and estimated population
Kipunji	R. kipunji Jones et al., 2005	Southeastern Africa	Size: 85–90 cm (33–35 in) long, plus about 115 cm (45 in) tail Habitat: Forest Diet: Omnivorous, including bulbs, roots, shoots, seeds, and fruit	EN Unknown

Genus Theropithecus – Geoffroy, 1843 – one species
Common name	Scientific name and subspecies	Range	Size and ecology	IUCN status and estimated population
Gelada	T. gelada (Rüppell, 1835) Two subspecies: T. g. gelada (Northern gelada); T. g. obscurus (Eastern gelada)	Eastern Africa	Size: 50–75 cm (20–30 in) long, plus 32–55 cm (13–22 in) tail Habitat: Grassland and rocky areas Diet: Leaves and forbs, as well as roots, corms, tubers and rhizomes	LC Unknown

=== Subfamily Colobinae ===
Genus Colobus – Illiger, 1811 – five species
Common name	Scientific name and subspecies	Range	Size and ecology	IUCN status and estimated population
Angola colobus	C. angolensis P. L. Sclater, 1860 Six subspecies: C. a. angolensis (Sclater's Angola colobus); C. a. cordieri (Cordier's Angola colobus); C. a. cottoni (Powell-Cotton's Angola colobus); C. a. palliates (Tanzanian black-and-white colobus); C. a. prigoginei (Prigogine's Angola colobus); C. a. ruwenzorii (Ruwenzori colobus); C. a. sharpei (Sharpe's Angola Colobus)	Central Africa	Size: 49–68 cm (19–27 in) long, plus 70–83 cm (28–33 in) tail Habitat: Forest Diet: Leaves, as well as stems, bark, flowers, buds, shoots, fruits, and insects	VU Unknown
Black colobus	C. satanas Waterhouse, 1838 Two subspecies: C. s. anthracinus (Gabon black colobus); C. s. satanas (Bioko black colobus)	Western Africa	Size: 50–70 cm (20–28 in) long, plus 62–88 cm (24–35 in) tail Habitat: Forest Diet: Nuts and seeds, as well as unripe fruit and leaves	VU Unknown
King colobus	C. polykomos (Zimmermann, 1780)	Western Africa	Size: 45–72 cm (18–28 in) long, plus 52–100 cm (20–39 in) tail Habitat: Forest and savanna Diet: Leaves, as well as fruit and flowers	EN Unknown
Mantled guereza	C. guereza Rüppell, 1835 Seven subspecies: C. g. caudatus (Kilimanjaro guereza); C. g. dodingae (Dodinga Hills guereza); C. g. guereza (Omo River guereza); C. g. kikuyuensis (Eastern black-and-white colobus); C. g. matschiei (Mau Forest guereza); C. g. occidentalis (Western guereza); C. g. percivali (Mt Uaraguess guereza)	Central Africa	Size: 45–72 cm (18–28 in) long, plus 52–100 cm (20–39 in) tail Habitat: Forest Diet: Leaves, as well as fruit, buds, and blossoms	LC Unknown
Ursine colobus	C. vellerosus (Geoffroy, 1834)	Western Africa	Size: 60–67 cm (24–26 in) long, plus 73–93 cm (29–37 in) tail Habitat: Forest Diet: Leaves and seeds, as well as fruit, insects, and clay	CR 975

Genus Nasalis – Geoffroy, 1812 – one species
Common name	Scientific name and subspecies	Range	Size and ecology	IUCN status and estimated population
Proboscis monkey	N. larvatus Wurmb, 1787	Borneo	Size: 61–76 cm (24–30 in) long, plus 50–75 cm (20–30 in) tail Habitat: Forest Diet: Fruit, seeds, leaves, and shoots, as well as caterpillars and larvae	EN Unknown

Genus Piliocolobus – Rochebrune, 1887 – sixteen species
Common name	Scientific name and subspecies	Range	Size and ecology	IUCN status and estimated population
Bouvier's red colobus	P. bouvieri (Rochebrune, 1887)	Congo (in purple on left)	Size: 41–70 cm (16–28 in) long, plus 42–80 cm (17–31 in) tail Habitat: Forest Diet: Fruit, seeds, and leaves	EN Unknown
Foa's red colobus	P. foai (Pousargues, 1899)	Congo (in black, bottom right)	Size: 41–70 cm (16–28 in) long, plus 42–80 cm (17–31 in) tail Habitat: Forest Diet: Fruit, seeds, and leaves	EN Unknown
Lomami red colobus	P. parmentieri (Colyn, Verheyen, 1987)	Congo	Size: 41–70 cm (16–28 in) long, plus 42–80 cm (17–31 in) tail Habitat: Forest Diet: Fruit, seeds, and leaves	EN Unknown
Lang's red colobus	P. langi (J. A. Allen, 1925)	Congo	Size: 41–70 cm (16–28 in) long, plus 42–80 cm (17–31 in) tail Habitat: Forest Diet: Fruit, seeds, and leaves	EN Unknown
Miss Waldron's red colobus	P. waldronae (Hayman, 1936)	Western Africa	Size: 47–63 cm (19–25 in) long, plus 52–75 cm (20–30 in) tail Habitat: Forest Diet: Fruit, seeds, leaves, buds, and flowers	CR Unknown
Niger Delta red colobus	P. epieni (Grubb, Powell, 1999)	Western Africa	Size: 41–70 cm (16–28 in) long, plus 42–80 cm (17–31 in) tail Habitat: Forest Diet: Fruit, seeds, and leaves	CR Unknown
Oustalet's red colobus	P. oustaleti (Trouessart, 1906)	Congo (in green)	Size: 41–70 cm (16–28 in) long, plus 42–80 cm (17–31 in) tail Habitat: Forest Diet: Fruit, seeds, and leaves	VU Unknown
Pennant's colobus	P. pennantii (Waterhouse, 1838)	Western Africa	Size: 53–63 cm (21–25 in) long, plus 60–70 cm (24–28 in) tail Habitat: Forest Diet: Leaves and shoots, as well as seeds and fruit	CR Unknown
Preuss's red colobus	P. preussi (Matschie, 1900)	Western Africa	Size: 41–70 cm (16–28 in) long, plus 42–80 cm (17–31 in) tail Habitat: Forest Diet: Fruit, seeds, and leaves	CR Unknown
Semliki red colobus	P. semlikiensis (Colyn, 1991)	Congo (in dark blue on right)	Size: 41–70 cm (16–28 in) long, plus 42–80 cm (17–31 in) tail Habitat: Forest Diet: Fruit, seeds, and leaves	VU Unknown
Tana River red colobus	P. rufomitratus (Peters, 1879)	Kenya	Size: 45–67 cm (18–26 in) long, plus 52–80 cm (20–31 in) tail Habitat: Forest, shrubland, and inland wetlands Diet: Leaves, fruit, and seeds, as well as flowers	CR Unknown
Thollon's red colobus	P. tholloni (A. Milne-Edwards, 1886)	Congo (in orange)	Size: 41–70 cm (16–28 in) long, plus 42–80 cm (17–31 in) tail Habitat: Forest Diet: Leaves, fruit, and seeds, as well as flowers	VU Unknown
Udzungwa red colobus	P. gordonorum (Matschie, 1900)	Southeastern Africa	Size: 41–70 cm (16–28 in) long, plus 42–80 cm (17–31 in) tail Habitat: Forest Diet: Fruit, seeds, and leaves	VU 35,000
Ugandan red colobus	P. tephrosceles Elliot, 1907	Eastern Africa	Size: 41–70 cm (16–28 in) long, plus 42–80 cm (17–31 in) tail Habitat: Forest and savanna Diet: Fruit, seeds, and leaves	EN Unknown
Western red colobus	P. badius (Kerr, 1792) Three subspecies: P. b. badius (Bay red colobus); P. b. temminckii (Temminck's red colobus)	Western Africa	Size: 45–67 cm (18–26 in) long, plus 52–80 cm (20–31 in) tail Habitat: Forest and savanna Diet: Leaves, seeds, unripe fruit, and shoots	EN Unknown
Zanzibar red colobus	P. kirkii (Gray, 1868)	Eastern Africa	Size: 41–70 cm (16–28 in) long, plus 42–80 cm (17–31 in) tail Habitat: Forest and shrubland Diet: Leaves, fruit, and seeds, as well as flowers	EN 5,900

Genus Presbytis – Eschscholtz, 1821 – nineteen species
Common name	Scientific name and subspecies	Range	Size and ecology	IUCN status and estimated population
Black Sumatran langur	P. sumatranus (S. Müller, Schlegel, 1841)	Island of Sumatra in Indonesia	Size: 42–61 cm (17–24 in) long, plus 50–85 cm (20–33 in) tail Habitat: Forest Diet: Fruit, leaves, seeds and flowers	EN Unknown
Black-and-white langur	P. bicolor Aimi, Bakar, 1992	Island of Sumatra	Size: 42–61 cm (17–24 in) long, plus 50–85 cm (20–33 in) tail Habitat: Forest Diet: Fruit, seeds, and leaves	DD Unknown
Black-crested Sumatran langur	P. melalophos (Raffles, 1821)	Island of Sumatra	Size: 42–61 cm (17–24 in) long, plus 50–85 cm (20–33 in) tail Habitat: Forest and shrubland Diet: Fruits and leaves, as well as seeds and flowers	EN Unknown
East Sumatran banded langur	P. percura Lyon, 1908	Island of Sumatra	Size: 42–61 cm (17–24 in) long, plus 50–85 cm (20–33 in) tail Habitat: Forest Diet: Fruit, seeds, and leaves	CR Unknown
Hose's langur	P. hosei (Thomas, 1889)	Borneo	Size: 42–61 cm (17–24 in) long, plus 50–85 cm (20–33 in) tail Habitat: Forest Diet: Leaves, unripe fruits, seeds, flowers, bird eggs and nestlings	VU Unknown
Javan surili	P. comata (Desmarest, 1822) Two subspecies: P. c. comata; P. c. fredericae	Island of Java in Indonesia	Size: 42–61 cm (17–24 in) long, plus 50–85 cm (20–33 in) tail Habitat: Forest Diet: Leaves, as well as fruits, flowers, and seeds	VU 5,500
Maroon leaf monkey	P. rubicunda (Müller, 1838) Five subspecies: P. r. carimatae; P. r. chrysea; P. r. ignita; P. r. rubicunda; P. r. rubida	Borneo	Size: 42–61 cm (17–24 in) long, plus 50–85 cm (20–33 in) tail Habitat: Forest and inland wetlands Diet: Leaves, seeds, and fruit, as well as flowers and pith	VU Unknown
Siberut langur	P. siberu (Chasen, Kloss, 1928)	Island of Siberut in Indonesia	Size: 42–61 cm (17–24 in) long, plus 50–85 cm (20–33 in) tail Habitat: Forest Diet: Fruit, seeds, and leaves	EN Unknown
Mentawai langur	P. potenziani (Bonaparte, 1856)	Mentawai islands in Indonesia	Size: 42–61 cm (17–24 in) long, plus 50–85 cm (20–33 in) tail Habitat: Forest Diet: Fruit, seeds, and leaves	CR Unknown
Miller's langur	P. canicrus G. S. Miller, 1934	Eastern Borneo (in light green)	Size: 42–61 cm (17–24 in) long, plus 50–85 cm (20–33 in) tail Habitat: Forest Diet: Fruit, seeds, and leaves	EN Unknown
Mitered langur	P. mitrata Eschscholtz, 1821	Island of Sumatra	Size: 42–61 cm (17–24 in) long, plus 50–85 cm (20–33 in) tail Habitat: Forest Diet: Fruit, seeds, and leaves	VU Unknown
Natuna Island surili	P. natunae (Thomas, Hartert, 1894)	Island of Natuna Besar in Indonesia	Size: 42–61 cm (17–24 in) long, plus 50–85 cm (20–33 in) tail Habitat: Forest Diet: Fruit, seeds, and leaves	VU 9,000
Raffles' banded langur	P. femoralis (Martin, 1838)	Singapore and southern Peninsular Malaysia	Size: 42–61 cm (17–24 in) long, plus 50–85 cm (20–33 in) tail Habitat: Forest Diet: Fruit, seeds, and leaves	CR 200–250
Robinson's banded langur	P. robinsoni Thomas, 1910	Southern Malay Peninsula	Size: 42–61 cm (17–24 in) long, plus 50–85 cm (20–33 in) tail Habitat: Forest Diet: Fruit, seeds, and leaves	NT Unknown
Sabah grizzled langur	P. sabana (Thomas, 1893)	Eastern Borneo (in dark brown)	Size: 42–61 cm (17–24 in) long, plus 50–85 cm (20–33 in) tail Habitat: Forest Diet: Fruit, seeds, and leaves	EN Unknown
Sarawak surili	P. chrysomelas (Müller, 1838) Two subspecies: P. c. chrysomelas; P. c. cruciger	Northern Borneo	Size: 42–61 cm (17–24 in) long, plus 50–85 cm (20–33 in) tail Habitat: Forest Diet: Fruit, seeds, and leaves	CR Unknown
Thomas's langur	P. thomasi (Collett, 1893)	Northern island of Sumatra in Indonesia	Size: 42–62 cm (17–24 in) long, plus 50–85 cm (20–33 in) tail Habitat: Forest Diet: Fruit, leaves, and seeds, as well as flowers, bark, twigs, stalks, birds, bird eggs, algae, and insects	VU Unknown
White-fronted surili	P. frontata (Müller, 1838)	Borneo	Size: 42–61 cm (17–24 in) long, plus 50–85 cm (20–33 in) tail Habitat: Forest Diet: Fruit, seeds, and leaves	VU Unknown
White-thighed surili	P. siamensis (Müller, Schlegel, 1838) Four subspecies: P. s. cana; P. s. paenulata; P. s. rhionis; P. s. siamensis	Southeastern Asia	Size: 42–61 cm (17–24 in) long, plus 50–85 cm (20–33 in) tail Habitat: Forest Diet: Fruit, seeds, and leaves	NT Unknown

Genus Procolobus – Rochebrune, 1877 – one species
Common name	Scientific name and subspecies	Range	Size and ecology	IUCN status and estimated population
Olive colobus	P. verus (Van Beneden, 1838)	Western Africa	Size: 43–50 cm (17–20 in) long, plus 57–64 cm (22–25 in) tail Habitat: Forest Diet: Leaves and flowers	VU Unknown

Genus Pygathrix – Geoffroy, 1812 – three species
Common name	Scientific name and subspecies	Range	Size and ecology	IUCN status and estimated population
Black-shanked douc	P. nigripes H. Milne-Edwards, 1871	Southeastern Asia	Size: 60–76 cm (24–30 in) long, plus 56–76 cm (22–30 in) tail Habitat: Forest Diet: Leaves, as well as seeds, fruit and flowers	CR Unknown
Gray-shanked douc	P. cinerea (Nadler, 1997)	Southeastern Asia	Size: About 60 cm (24 in) long, plus 59–68 cm (23–27 in) tail Habitat: Forest Diet: Leaves, as well as buds, fruit, seeds, and flowers	CR Unknown
Red-shanked douc	P. nemaeus (Linnaeus, 1771)	Southeastern Asia	Size: 61–77 cm (24–30 in) long, plus 55–77 cm (22–30 in) tail Habitat: Forest Diet: Leaves, as well as unripe fruit, seeds, and flowers	CR Unknown

Genus Rhinopithecus – H. Milne-Edwards, 1872 – five species
Common name	Scientific name and subspecies	Range	Size and ecology	IUCN status and estimated population
Black-and-white snub-nosed monkey	R. bieti (A. Milne-Edwards, 1897)	Southern China	Size: 74–83 cm (29–33 in) long, plus 51–72 cm (20–28 in) tail Habitat: Forest Diet: Leaves, fruit, and lichen	EN 1,000
Golden snub-nosed monkey	R. roxellana A. Milne-Edwards, 1870 Three subspecies: R. r. hubeiensis (Hubei golden snub-nosed monkey); R. r. qinlingensis (Qinling golden snub-nosed monkey); R. r. roxellana (Moupin golden snub-nosed monkey)	Central China	Size: 57–76 cm (22–30 in) long, plus 51–72 cm (20–28 in) tail Habitat: Forest Diet: Leaves, bark, and lichen, as well as buds and fruit seeds	EN Unknown
Gray snub-nosed monkey	R. brelichi Thomas, 1903	Central China	Size: 64–73 cm (25–29 in) long, plus 70–97 cm (28–38 in) tail Habitat: Forest Diet: Leaves, buds, fruit, seeds and bark, as well as insect larvae	CR 200
Myanmar snub-nosed monkey	R. strykeri Geissmann et al., 2010	Northern Myanmar	Size: About 56 cm (22 in) long, plus 78 cm (31 in) tail Habitat: Forest Diet: Leaves, fruit, seeds, buds, flowers, twigs, and bark	CR 350–400
Tonkin snub-nosed monkey	R. avunculus (Dollman, 1912)	Northern Vietnam	Size: 51–65 cm (20–26 in) long, plus 66–92 cm (26–36 in) tail Habitat: Forest Diet: Leaves, fruit, flowers, and seeds	CR 80–100

Genus Semnopithecus – Desmarest, 1822 – eight species
Common name	Scientific name and subspecies	Range	Size and ecology	IUCN status and estimated population
Black-footed gray langur	S. hypoleucos Blyth, 1841 Three subspecies: S. h. achates; S. h. hypoleucos; S. h. iulus	Southern India	Size: 41–78 cm (16–31 in) long, plus 69–108 cm (27–43 in) tail Habitat: Forest and shrubland Diet: Leaves, fruit, and flowers	LC Unknown
Kashmir gray langur	S. ajax Pocock, 1928	Himalayas	Size: 41–78 cm (16–31 in) long, plus 69–108 cm (27–43 in) tail Habitat: Forest Diet: Leaves, bark, and seeds	EN 1,400–1,500
Nepal gray langur	S. schistaceus Hodgson, 1840	Himalayas	Size: 41–78 cm (16–31 in) long, plus 69–108 cm (27–43 in) tail Habitat: Forest, shrubland, and rocky areas Diet: Leaves and fruit, as well as seeds, roots, flowers, bark, twigs, coniferous cones, moss, lichens, ferns, shoots, rhizomes, grass, and invertebrate animals	LC Unknown
Nilgiri langur	S. johnii (J. Fischer, 1829)	Southern India	Size: 41–78 cm (16–31 in) long, plus 69–108 cm (27–43 in) tail Habitat: Forest Diet: Leaves, fruit, and flowers	VU 9,500–10,000
Northern plains gray langur	S. entellus (Dufresne, 1797)	India	Size: 41–78 cm (16–31 in) long, plus 69–108 cm (27–43 in) tail Habitat: Forest, savanna, and shrubland Diet: Leaves, fruit, and flowers, as well as insects, bark, gum, and soil	LC Unknown
Tarai gray langur	S. hector Pocock, 1928	Himalayas	Size: 41–78 cm (16–31 in) long, plus 69–108 cm (27–43 in) tail Habitat: Forest Diet: Leaves, fruit, and flowers	NT Unknown
Tufted gray langur	S. priam Blyth, 1844 Three subspecies: S. p. anchises; S. p. priam; S. p. thersites	Southern India and Sri Lanka	Size: 41–78 cm (16–31 in) long, plus 69–108 cm (27–43 in) tail Habitat: Forest and shrubland Diet: Leaves and fruit	NT Unknown
Purple-faced langur	S. vetulus (Erxleben, 1777) Four subspecies: T. v. monticola (Montane purple-faced langur); T. v. nestor (Western purple-faced langur); T. v. philbricki (Dryzone purple-faced langur); T. v. vetulus (Southern lowland wetzone purple-faced langur)	Sri Lanka	Size: 41–78 cm (16–31 in) long, plus 69–108 cm (27–43 in) tail Habitat: Forest Diet: Leaves, fruit, flowers, and seeds	EN Unknown

Genus Simias – Miller, 1903 – one species
Common name	Scientific name and subspecies	Range	Size and ecology	IUCN status and estimated population
Pig-tailed langur	S. concolor Miller, 1903 Three subspecies: S. c. concolor; S. c. siberu	Islands near Sumatra in Indonesia	Size: 45–53 cm (18–21 in) long, plus 13–18 cm (5–7 in) tail Habitat: Forest Diet: Leaves, fruit, and berries	CR Unknown

Genus Trachypithecus – Reichenbach, 1862 – twenty-one species
Common name	Scientific name and subspecies	Range	Size and ecology	IUCN status and estimated population
Annamese langur	T. margarita (Elliot, 1909)	Southeastern Asia	Size: 40–76 cm (16–30 in) long, plus 57–110 cm (22–43 in) tail Habitat: Forest Diet: Leaves, flowers, and fruit	EN Unknown
Capped langur	T. pileatus (Blyth, 1843) Three subspecies: T. p. brahma; T. p. pileatus; T. p. tenebricus	Southern Asia	Size: 40–76 cm (16–30 in) long, plus 57–110 cm (22–43 in) tail Habitat: Forest Diet: Leaves, seeds, and fruit, as well as flowers, buds, bark, and caterpillars	VU Unknown
Cat Ba langur	T. poliocephalus (Pousargues, 1898)	Cát Bà Island, Vietnam (in purple)	Size: 40–76 cm (16–30 in) long, plus 57–110 cm (22–43 in) tail Habitat: Forests and caves Diet: Leaves, flowers, and fruit	CR 30–35
Delacour's langur	T. delacouri (Osgood, 1911)	Northern Vietnam	Size: 40–76 cm (16–30 in) long, plus 57–110 cm (22–43 in) tail Habitat: Forest, rocky areas, and caves Diet: Leaves, flowers, and fruit	CR 240–250
Dusky leaf monkey	T. obscurus (Reid, 1837) Seven subspecies: T. o. carbo; T. o. flavicauda; T. o. halonifer; T. o. obscurus; T. o. sanctorum; T. o. seimundi; T. o. styx	Southeastern Asia	Size: 42–61 cm (17–24 in) long, plus 50–85 cm (20–33 in) tail Habitat: Forest Diet: Leaves, shoots, fruit, and seedlings	EN Unknown
East Javan langur	T. auratus Geoffroy, 1812	Java and nearby islands in Indonesia	Size: 44–65 cm (17–26 in) long, plus 61–87 cm (24–34 in) tail Habitat: Forest Diet: Leaves and flowers, as well as fruit and insect larvae	VU Unknown
François' langur	T. francoisi (Pousargues, 1898)	Southern Asia	Size: 40–76 cm (16–30 in) long, plus 57–110 cm (22–43 in) tail Habitat: Forest, rocky areas, and caves Diet: Leaves, fruit, and seeds, as well as insects	EN 2,000–2,100
Gee's golden langur	T. geei (Khajuria, 1956)	Southern Asia	Size: 50–75 cm (20–30 in) long, plus 70–100 cm (28–39 in) tail Habitat: Forest Diet: Fruit, leaves, flowers, seeds, and twigs	EN 6,000–6,500
Germain's langur	T. germaini (H. Milne-Edwards, 1876)	Southeastern Asia	Size: 40–76 cm (16–30 in) long, plus 57–110 cm (22–43 in) tail Habitat: Forest and rocky areas Diet: Leaves, fruit, and flowers	EN Unknown
Hatinh langur	T. hatinhensis (Dao, 1970)	Vietnam	Size: 40–76 cm (16–30 in) long, plus 57–110 cm (22–43 in) tail Habitat: Forest, rocky areas, and caves Diet: Leaves, as well as fruit, vines, and flowers	EN Unknown
Indochinese black langur	T. ebenus Brandon-Jones, 1995	Southeastern Asia	Size: 40–76 cm (16–30 in) long, plus 57–110 cm (22–43 in) tail Habitat: Forest, rocky areas, and caves Diet: Leaves, as well as fruit, vines, and flowers	EN Unknown
Indochinese grey langur	T. crepuscula (Elliot, 1909)	Southeast Asia (in red)	Size: 40–76 cm (16–30 in) long, plus 57–110 cm (22–43 in) tail Habitat: Forest, inland wetlands, and rocky areas Diet: Leaves, flowers, and fruit	EN 2,400–2,500
Laotian langur	T. laotum (Thomas, 1911)	Laos	Size: 40–76 cm (16–30 in) long, plus 57–110 cm (22–43 in) tail Habitat: Forest and rocky areas Diet: Leaves, flowers, and fruit	EN Unknown
Phayre's leaf monkey	T. phayrei (Blyth, 1847) Two subspecies: T. p. phayrei; T. p. shanicus	Southeast Asia (in green)	Size: 40–76 cm (16–30 in) long, plus 57–110 cm (22–43 in) tail Habitat: Forest Diet: Leaves, as well as bamboo shoots	EN Unknown
Popa langur	T. popa Roos et al., 2020	Myanmar	Size: 40–76 cm (16–30 in) long, plus 57–110 cm (22–43 in) tail Habitat: Forest Diet: Leaves, flowers, and fruit	CR 130–180
Shortridge's langur	T. shortridgei Wroughton, 1915	Southern Asia	Size: 40–76 cm (16–30 in) long, plus 57–110 cm (22–43 in) tail Habitat: Forest Diet: Leaves, flowers, and fruit	EN Unknown
Selangor silvered langur	T. selangorensis Roos, Nadler, Walter, 2008	Peninsular Malaysia	Size: 40–76 cm (16–30 in) long, plus 57–110 cm (22–43 in) tail Habitat: Forest Diet: Leaves, flowers, and fruit	NT Unknown
Silvery lutung	T. cristatus Raffles, 1821 Two subspecies: T. c. cristatus; T. c. vigilans	Southeastern Asia	Size: 46–56 cm (18–22 in) long, plus 63–84 cm (25–33 in) tail Habitat: Forest Diet: Leaves, as well as fruit, seeds, shoots, flowers, and buds	VU Unknown
Tenasserim lutung	T. barbei (Blyth, 1847)	Southeastern Asia	Size: 40–76 cm (16–30 in) long, plus 57–110 cm (22–43 in) tail Habitat: Forest Diet: Leaves, flowers, and fruit	VU Unknown
West Javan langur	T. mauritius (Griffith, 1821)	Island of Java	Size: 40–76 cm (16–30 in) long, plus 57–110 cm (22–43 in) tail Habitat: Forest Diet: Leaves, flowers, and fruit	VU Unknown
White-headed langur	T. leucocephalus Tan, 1957	Southern China	Size: 40–76 cm (16–30 in) long, plus 57–110 cm (22–43 in) tail Habitat: Rocky areas Diet: Leaves, flowers, and fruit	CR 230–250

== Sources ==
- Groves, Colin P. (2005). Wilson, Don E.; Reeder, DeeAnn M. (eds.). Mammal Species of the World. Vol. 1 (3rd ed.). Johns Hopkins University Press. ISBN 978-0-8018-8221-0.
- Kingdon, Jonathan (2014). Mammals of Africa. Vol. II: Primates. A & C Black. ISBN 978-1-4081-8991-7.
- Kingdon, Jonathan (2015). The Kingdon Field Guide to African Mammals (Second ed.). Bloomsbury Publishing. ISBN 978-1-4729-2531-2.
- Nowak, Ronald M. (1999a). Walker's Mammals of the World. Vol. 1. Johns Hopkins University Press. ISBN 978-0-8018-5789-8.
- Nowak, Ronald M. (1999b). Walker's Primates of the World. Johns Hopkins University Press. ISBN 978-0-8018-6251-9.
- Petter, Jean-Jacques; Desbordes, François (2013). Primates of the World: An Illustrated Guide. Princeton University Press. ISBN 978-0-691-15695-8.
