= Foa's red colobus =

Conservation status
- Endangered (IUCN 3.1)

Scientific classification
- Kingdom: Animalia
- Phylum: Chordata
- Class: Mammalia
- Infraclass: Placentalia
- Order: Primates
- Family: Cercopithecidae
- Genus: Piliocolobus
- Species: P. foai

Binomial name
- Piliocolobus foai (de Pousargues, 1899)
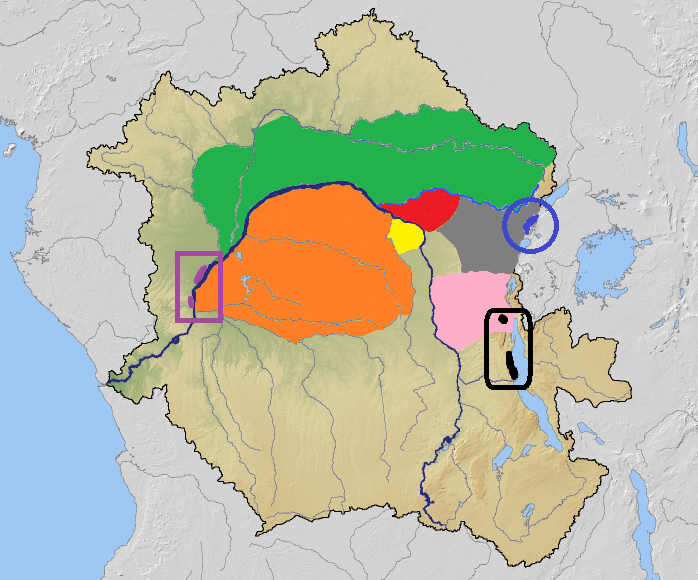
- Foa's red colobus range shown in black

Species of Old World monkey

Foa's red colobus (Piliocolobus foai) or the Central African red colobus, is a species of red colobus monkey found in the Democratic Republic of the Congo.

== Taxonomy ==
Several other species of red colobus were formerly considered subspecies of Piliocolobus foai by at least some authors but have since been elevated to full species. These include:

- Lang's red colobus (P. langi)
- Ulindi River red colobus (P. lulindicus)
- Oustalet's red colobus (P. oustaleti)
- Lomami red colobus (P. parmentieri)
- Tana River red colobus (P. rufomitratus)
- Semliki red colobus (P. semlikiensis)
- Ugandan red colobus (P. tephrosceles)

It was previously thought that Foa's red colobus was made of two formerly separate species, one originally from the highlands and the other originally from the lowlands, which interbred into a single species. The highland species has since been split into P. foai sensu stricto, while the lowland species has been split into P. lulindicus.

== Distribution ==
Foa's red colobus is known only from two widely separated regions in the Itombwe Mountains of the Democratic Republic of the Congo. It likely once had a larger range throughout the Albertine Rift, but past deforestation in the area is thought to have led to a major range contraction.

== Description ==
Foa's red colobus has long red and black fur on its back and head, with light underparts. Males have a body length excluding tail of between 50 and 69 centimetres (20 and 27 in) with a tail that is between 62 and 67 centimetres (24 and 26 in) long. Males typically weigh between 9 and 13 kilograms (20 and 29 lb) and females typically between 7 and 9 kilograms (15 and 20 lb). It has smaller teeth than most other red colobus species.

== Behavior ==
Foa's red colobus is arboreal and diurnal. It has a varied diet which includes leaves, buds, fruit and flowers. It is frequently hunted for bushmeat.
