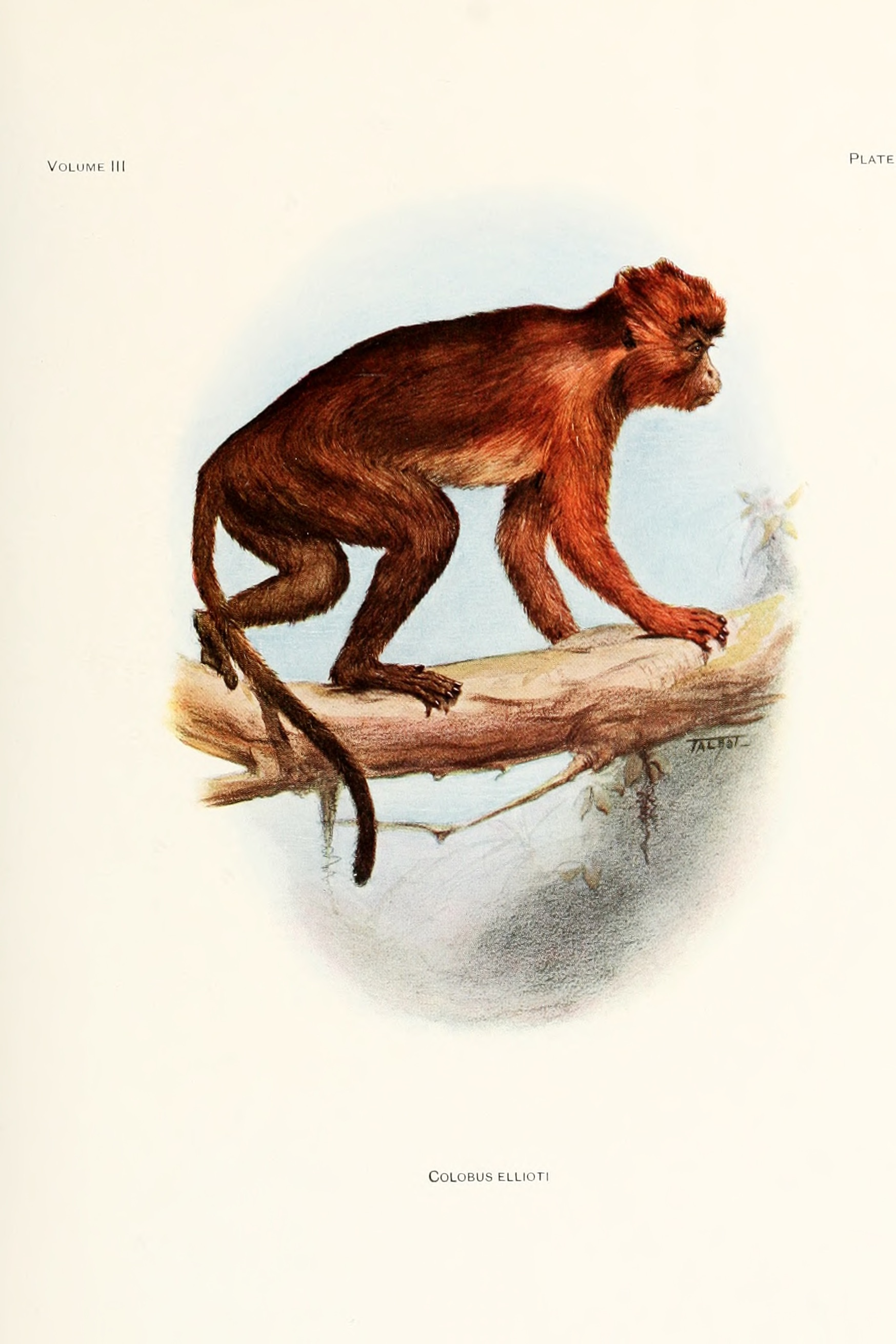

Scientific classification
- Kingdom: Animalia
- Phylum: Chordata
- Class: Mammalia
- Infraclass: Placentalia
- Order: Primates
- Family: Cercopithecidae
- Tribe: Colobini
- Genus: Piliocolobus

Groups included
- Piliocolobus foai; Piliocolobus langi; Piliocolobus oustaleti; Piliocolobus parmentieri; Piliocolobus rufomitratus; Piliocolobus semlikiensis; Piliocolobus tephrosceles
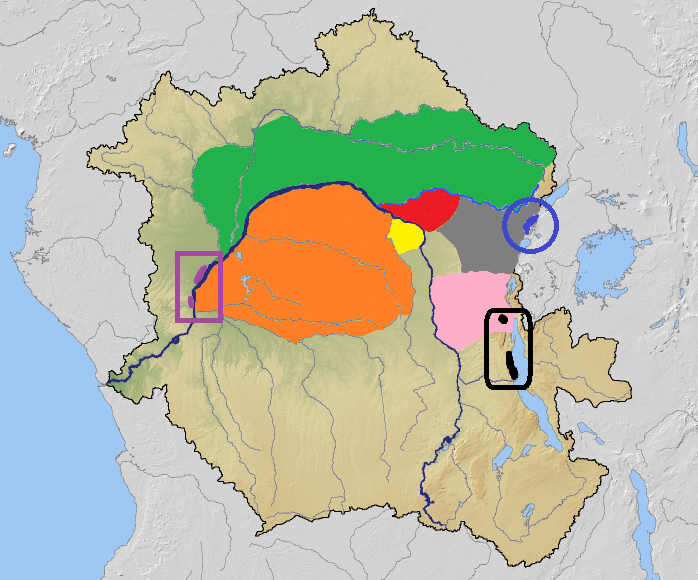
- Species considered Central African red colobus are found within the ranges colored in green, red, yellow, gray, dark blue and pink

Cladistically included but traditionally excluded taxa
- All nine other species in this genus

= Central African red colobus =

Common name for several monkey species

Central African red colobus is the traditional name for several species of red colobus monkey that had formerly been considered a single species, Piliocolobus foai. Central African red colobus monkeys are found in humid forests in the Democratic Republic of the Congo, the Republic of the Congo, the Central African Republic and South Sudan.

Species that have at times been included within the Central African red colobus include:

- Foa's red colobus (Piliocolobus foai)
- Lang's red colobus (Piliocolobus langi)
- Oustalet's red colobus (Piliocolobus oustaleti)
- Lomami red colobus (Piliocolobus parmentieri)
- Tana River red colobus (Piliocolobus rufomitratus)
- Semliki red colobus (Piliocolobus semlikiensis)
- Ugandan red colobus (Piliocolobus tephrosceles)

Central African red colobus monkeys are endemic to tropical central Africa, including the Republic of Congo, the southern part of the Central African Republic, the Democratic Republic of the Congo and the southern part of South Sudan. The southern limit of the range is the Congo River, the eastern limit is the Aruwimi River and the northern limit is the savannah woodlands north of the Uele River. They are found in lowland primary forest, particularly swampy areas, open woodland and gallery forest. They spend about seventy percent of their time in the canopy, and the rest of the time on the ground. They sometimes wade into water to collect aquatic bulbs.
