= Ulindi River red colobus =

Conservation status
- Endangered (IUCN 3.1)

Scientific classification
- Kingdom: Animalia
- Phylum: Chordata
- Class: Mammalia
- Infraclass: Placentalia
- Order: Primates
- Family: Cercopithecidae
- Genus: Piliocolobus
- Species: P. lulindicus

Binomial name
- Piliocolobus lulindicus Matschie, 1914
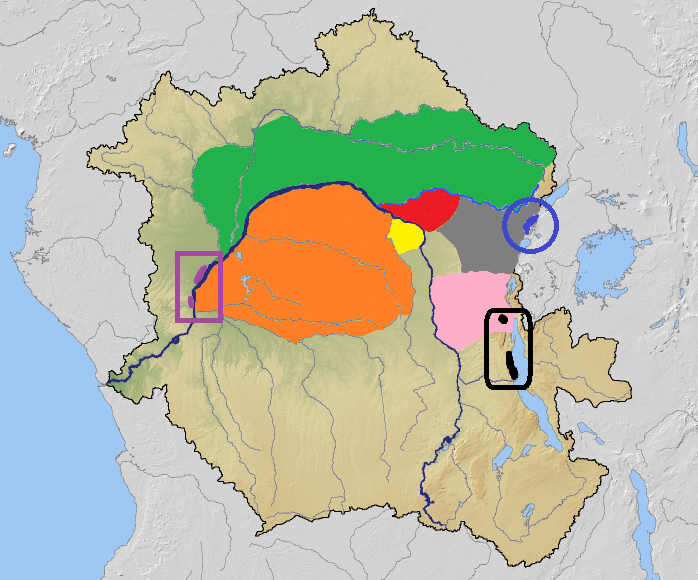
- Ulindi River red colobus range shown in pink

Species of Old World monkey

The Ulindi River red colobus (Piliocolobus lulindicus) is a species of red colobus monkey endemic to the Democratic Republic of the Congo. It is named after the Ulindi River.

It was formerly considered conspecific with Foa's red colobus (P. foai), but it has been tentatively recognized as a distinct species by the IUCN Red List and the American Society of Mammalogists.

It is found in lowland forests east of the Lualaba River, with the Albertine Rift serving as an eastern barrier to the species' range. It is found as far south as the Lukuga River and north to the Lowa River. It is threatened by habitat loss and hunting; its large size makes it a frequent target for bushmeat, and large tracts of its habitat are being deforested for farmland.
