= Miss Waldron's red colobus =

Conservation status
- Critically endangered, possibly extinct (IUCN 3.1)

Scientific classification
- Kingdom: Animalia
- Phylum: Chordata
- Class: Mammalia
- Order: Primates
- Family: Cercopithecidae
- Genus: Piliocolobus
- Species: P. waldronae

Binomial name
- Piliocolobus waldronae (Hayman, 1936)
- Miss Waldron's red colobus historic range shown in red

Species of Old World monkey

Miss Waldron's red colobus (Piliocolobus waldronae) is a species of the red colobus native to West Africa. It had previously been described as a subspecies of the western red colobus, P. badius. It has not been officially sighted since 1978 and was considered extinct in 2000. However, new evidence suggests that a very small number of these monkeys may be living in the southeast corner of Côte d'Ivoire. The IUCN Red List notes Miss Waldron's red colobus as critically endangered.

Miss Waldron's red colobus was discovered in December 1933 by Willoughby P. Lowe, a British Museum (Natural History) collector who had shot eight specimens of the animal. Robert William Hayman named it after a fellow museum employee, Miss Fanny Waldron, who assisted in the expedition where Lowe collected the eight specimens.

== Description ==
Black fur covers the majority of Miss Waldron's red colobus, but a distinctive pattern of bright red fur can be found on its forehead and thighs, allowing it to be distinguished from conspecifics. An Old World monkey, it grows to a height of about 3 feet (1 m), with a head that is small for its frame. No photograph of a living Miss Waldron's red colobus is known to exist.

== Ecology and status ==
High-canopy forests (rainforests) in Ghana and Côte d'Ivoire serve as the exclusive habitat of Miss Waldron's red colobus. The monkey usually forms large family groups of 20 or more. It is a social and highly vocal animal, frequently communicating with others using loud calls, shrieks and chattering. Its strategy for safety depends on using the many eyes and ears of the group.

Fruit, seeds and foliage provide the primary food source of Miss Waldron's red colobus. The western red colobus frequently is hunted and eaten by larger carnivores, including common chimpanzees (specifically western chimpanzees, Pan troglodytes verus, in the range of P. b. waldronae), leopards, pythons, eagles and humans.

=== Decline to (near-)extinction ===
The monkey was frequently (and illegally) poached for bushmeat, with little interference by local governments. Habitat destruction also played a role in its decline. Miss Waldron's red colobus is the first primate to be suspected extinct in the 21st century, but there is considerable debate over whether this assessment is indeed correct.

A series of forest surveys, conducted by the Wildlife Conservation Society from 1993 to 1999, failed to uncover any evidence of the monkey's existence, and the animal was declared extinct a year later. However, the IUCN and other authorities which compile Red Lists felt that the required criterion that "there is no reasonable doubt that its last individual has died" was not yet fulfilled.

However, primatologist W. Scott McGraw from Ohio State University has been collecting evidence of the monkey's continued existence during his expeditions to Côte d'Ivoire over the past several years:

- In 2000, McGraw was given a black monkey tail which DNA tests proved to be from a red colobus. The hunter who gave McGraw the tail claimed he had shot the monkey the previous year.
- In 2001, an Ivorian hunter gave McGraw a piece of reddish monkey skin believed to be from Miss Waldron's red colobus.
- That same year, McGraw received from an associate in Africa a photograph of what appeared to be an adult Miss Waldron's red colobus which had been killed. Experts who have examined the photograph attest to its likely authenticity.

Presumably, a relict population of the monkey still is found in the Ehy Forest (also Ehi or Tanoé Forest) near the mouth of the Tano River into Ehy Lagoon, at the border between Côte d'Ivoire and Ghana. Miss Waldron's Red Colobus is among the 25 "most wanted lost" species that are the focus of Re:wild's "Search for Lost Species" initiative.
