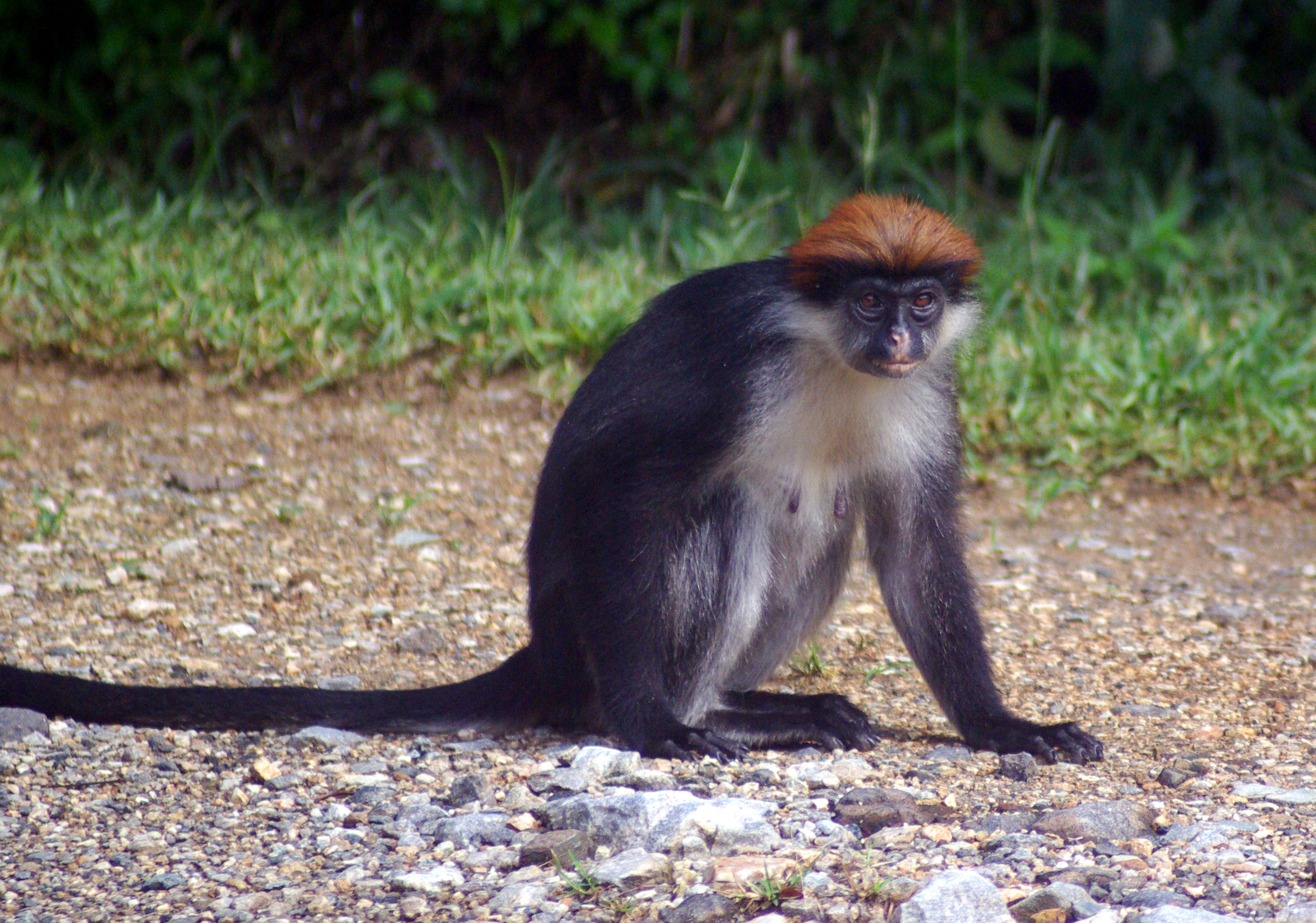

Conservation status
- Vulnerable (IUCN 3.1)

Scientific classification
- Kingdom: Animalia
- Phylum: Chordata
- Class: Mammalia
- Infraclass: Placentalia
- Order: Primates
- Family: Cercopithecidae
- Genus: Piliocolobus
- Species: P. gordonorum

Binomial name
- Piliocolobus gordonorum Matschie, 1900
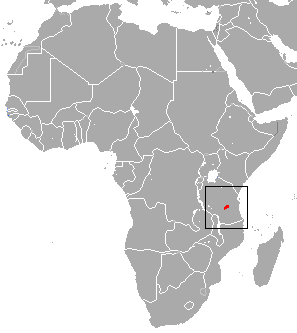
- Udzungwa red colobus range

= Udzungwa red colobus =

Species of Old World monkey

The Udzungwa red colobus (Piliocolobus gordonorum), also known as the Uzungwa red colobus or Iringa red colobus, is a species of the primate family Cercopithecidae that is endemic to riverine and montane forests in the Udzungwa Mountains in Tanzania. It is classified as Vulnerable in the IUCN Red List.

== Taxonomy ==
The Udzungwa red colobus is a species of the primate family Cercopithecidae. It was first described by German zoologist Paul Matschie in 1900. It has been considered as a subspecies of the Western red colobus and Pennant's red colobus by various zoologists. It was re-classified as a separate species in 2001.

== Morphology ==
The Udzungwa red colobus is a medium-sized monkey with a long tail. The males do not differ much in size from the females, but have longer canine teeth and a thicker tail. The body is covered with predominantly black fur with some greyish hairs. The sides of the face and underside are covered with white hairs. It has a tuft of brown or red hair like a crown on top of the head. The face is black with white colored lips and nose.

== Distribution and habitat ==
The Uzungwa red colobus is endemic to riverine and montane forests in the Udzungwa Mountains in the Kilolo District of the Iringa Region in Tanzania. It occurs in a variety of habitats from dry lowland forests to wet montane forests. It is found in large numbers in low-altitude semi-evergreen and deciduous forests with high precipitation. A 2009 study estimated the population at 25,000 to 35,000 mature individuals. It is threatened by habitat loss and is classified as a vulnerable species on the IUCN Red List.

== Behaviour ==
The red colobus is mostly diurnal, and spends more than one-third of the day feeding. The diet mainly consists of leaves. The animals are also known to dig and eat the soil, presumably to get minerals to aid in digestion and serve as an antitoxin. The primates often live in large social groups, and solitary individuals are rare in the wild. The groups tend to be larger in forested areas and smaller in dry lands. Adult males rarely show aggression and often engage in social behaviour within the group.
