= Thollon's red colobus =

Conservation status
- Vulnerable (IUCN 3.1)

Scientific classification
- Kingdom: Animalia
- Phylum: Chordata
- Class: Mammalia
- Infraclass: Placentalia
- Order: Primates
- Family: Cercopithecidae
- Genus: Piliocolobus
- Species: P. tholloni

Binomial name
- Piliocolobus tholloni (A. Milne-Edwards, 1886)
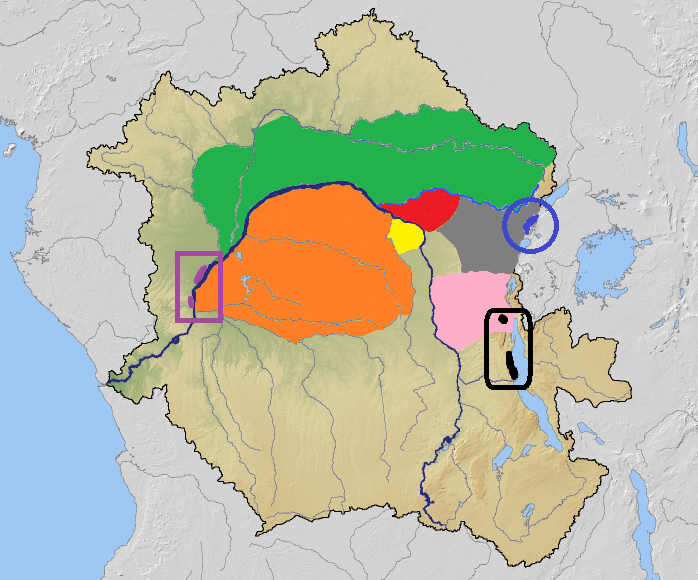
- Thollon's red colobus range shown in orange

Species of Old World monkey

Thollon's red colobus (Piliocolobus tholloni), also known as the Tshuapa red colobus, is a species of red colobus monkey from the Democratic Republic of the Congo and lower Republic of the Congo. It is found south of Congo River and west of Lomami River. It had once been considered a subspecies of P. badius. It was recognised as a distinct species by Dandelot in 1974, and this was followed by Groves in 2001, while others have suggested it should be considered a subspecies of P. rufomitratus.
