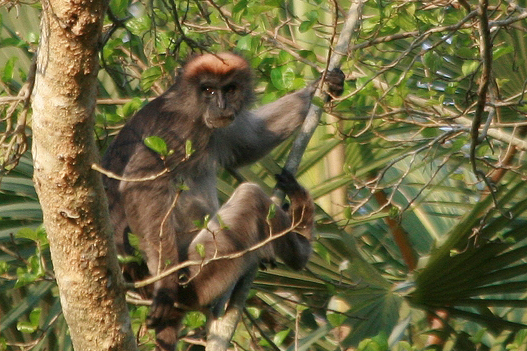
- P. rufomitratus in Tana River County, Kenya

Conservation status
- Critically Endangered (IUCN 3.1)
- CITES Appendix I

Scientific classification
- Kingdom: Animalia
- Phylum: Chordata
- Class: Mammalia
- Infraclass: Placentalia
- Order: Primates
- Family: Cercopithecidae
- Genus: Piliocolobus
- Species: P. rufomitratus

Binomial name
- Piliocolobus rufomitratus (Peters, 1879)

= Tana River red colobus =

Species of Old World monkey

The Tana River red colobus (Piliocolobus rufomitratus), also called the eastern red colobus, is a highly endangered species of primate in the family Cercopithecidae. It is endemic to a narrow zone of gallery forest near the Tana River in southeastern Kenya.

== Taxonomy ==
As here defined, P. rufomitratus is a monotypic species restricted to Kenya, following Groves. As all red colobuses, it was formerly considered a subspecies of a widespread P. badius. Some recent authorities include P. tephrosceles, P. foai and P. tholloni as subspecies of P. rufomitratus instead of recognizing them as separate species.

== Conservation status ==
The Tana River red colobus had been considered one of The World's 25 Most Endangered Primates. It was, together with the equally endangered Tana River mangabey, the main reason for the creation of the Tana River Primate Reserve in 1978, but human encroachment within this reserve continues. Recently, it has been suggested that 20,000 hectares of the Tana River Delta should be transformed into sugarcane plantations, but this has, temporarily at least, been stopped by the High Court of Kenya. Contra Groves, it was not recognized as a species separate from the Ugandan, Central African and Thollon's red colobus in the 2008 IUCN Red List. With these as subspecies, P. rufomitratus is considered to be of least concern in the 2008 IUCN Red List, while P. (r.) rufomitratus is considered endangered.

The Tana River red colobus has been under the watch of the Tana River Primate National Reserve (TRPNR). They put a large amount of research and study into the conservation of the Tana River red colobus. They found that only 37% of the red colobuses lived inside the preservation itself, which has brought the conservation strategy into question.

=== Causes of endangerment ===
The Tana River red colobus is located only in a very small section of the world. Its current endangerment is caused by habitat loss and persecution by humans. Tropical forests are constantly being cut down, causing the destruction of habitat for the red colobus. Cultivation of the land and the creation of levees and dykes have had the most devastating impact. Both human creations involve partial or complete forest clearing, resulting in further devastation of forest patches. Both the Tana River red colobus and the Tana River mangabey have been put in a dangerous situation due to deforestation and destruction created by an increasing human population. Forest is cleared primarily for agriculture; in the last 20 years approximately 50% of the unique forest has been lost. A survey conducted in 1987 concluded that since 1975 there has been approximately an 80% decline in the numbers of Tana River Colobus monkeys. Habitat disturbances, changing farming practices, and the altering course of the river were found to be the main reasons for endangerment.

Another developing threat to the Tana River red colobus is the introduction of parasitic diseases to their habitats. The presence of parasites in the monkeys was noticeably higher than other primates.

== Diet ==
Colobus monkeys eat mostly leaves from a limited number of tree species. They choose mature leaf species that are high in nitrogen and low in fiber. They supplement this bulky cellulose diet with occasional unripe fruit, moss and seeds. Human food is of no interest to these leaf specialists. Their stomachs are large and have three chambers, and carry a specific bacterium which helps to ferment and digest the leaves. They eat about two to three kilograms of leaves a day. Sometimes they eat soil, clay and charcoal to help digest toxins and toxic leaves. Because of the poor nutritional quality of their food, they must browse intensively for many hours each day looking for food, and spend much of the remainder of the day resting to aid digestion.

== Behavior ==
Tana River red colobus monkeys tend to be sedate and quiet creatures. They live together in small numbers and give out low calls when necessary.

== Habitat ==
The Tana River red colobus monkey gets its name from where it resides, along forests along the floodplain in the lower Tana River in eastern Kenya, the country's longest river. The river is roughly 1,000 km long. When the river is in a flood, the floodplain measures from one to six km in width, and about 60 to 100 m in width when not in a flood. Floods occur roughly once a year, with a major flood occurring every three years. Although the floodplain is mostly grassy, there are places with bushland, woodland, and forests.

=== Climate ===
The lower Tana River is generally hot and dry, with temperatures ranging from 86 to 100 °F (30 to 38 °C). The hottest months generally occur during January and February while the coldest months are May through July. The average annual rainfall is between 500 and 600 mm, with the wettest months being March and April and the driest being November and December.

=== Vegetation ===
The main vegetation that appears along the lower Tana River includes grassland, wooded grassland, bushland, deciduous woodland and lowland evergreen forest. Due to human disturbances as well as floods, patchy distributions of forests have resulted. A study was done in 1988 to determine what was causing the drastic decline of the crested mangabey and the Tana River red colobus. The forest was found to be regenerating and causing a new kind of vegetation to appeal to newer species. This could have been a cause of their drop of numbers.

== Reproduction ==
The Tana River red colobus has a polygynous mating system especially when only one male is present. The dominance hierarchy typically determines which individuals are allowed to mate. Little is known about the reproductive cycle in the wild due to this species' constant migration. The dominant male usually mates with females within the same social group. Females initiate mating through courtship displays and copulation calls. Red colobus monkeys breed throughout the year, and have a gestation period of about 4.5 to 5.5 months.

Infants cling to their mother's underbelly. Up until about 3.5 months in age infants travel only one meter away from the mother. By 3.5 to 5.5 they usually play with other monkeys. Females leave the group around 18 months of age and continue to move from group to group. Males may leave the group during adolescence but have a harder time being accepted into other social groups due to hierarchy.
