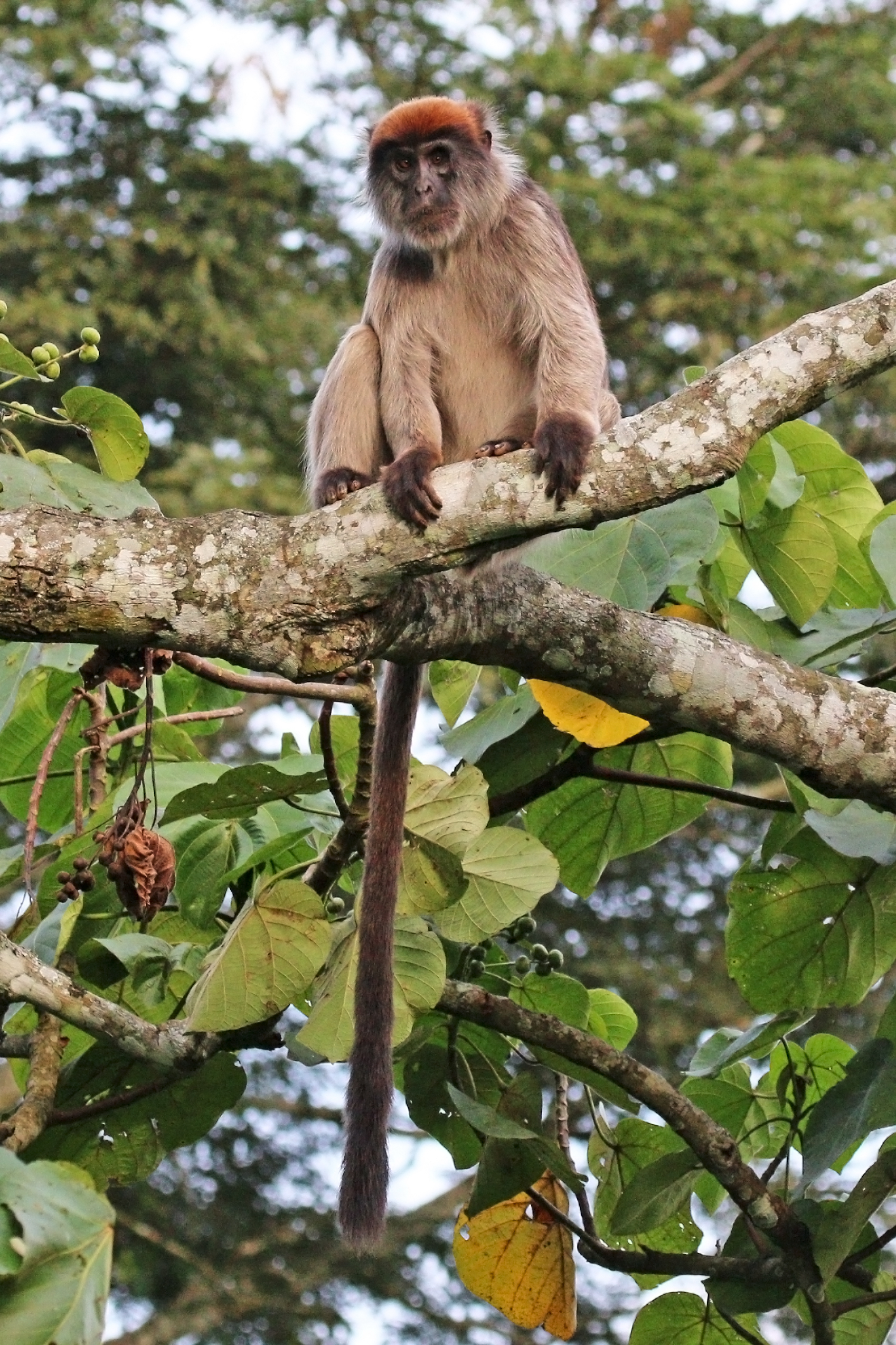
- Kihingami Wetlands, near Kibale Forest, Uganda

Conservation status
- Endangered (IUCN 3.1)
- CITES Appendix II

Scientific classification
- Kingdom: Animalia
- Phylum: Chordata
- Class: Mammalia
- Infraclass: Placentalia
- Order: Primates
- Family: Cercopithecidae
- Genus: Piliocolobus
- Species: P. tephrosceles

Binomial name
- Piliocolobus tephrosceles Elliot, 1907
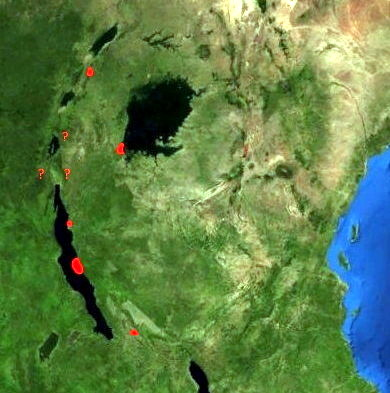
- Distribution of the Ugandan red colobus

= Ugandan red colobus =

Species of Old World monkey

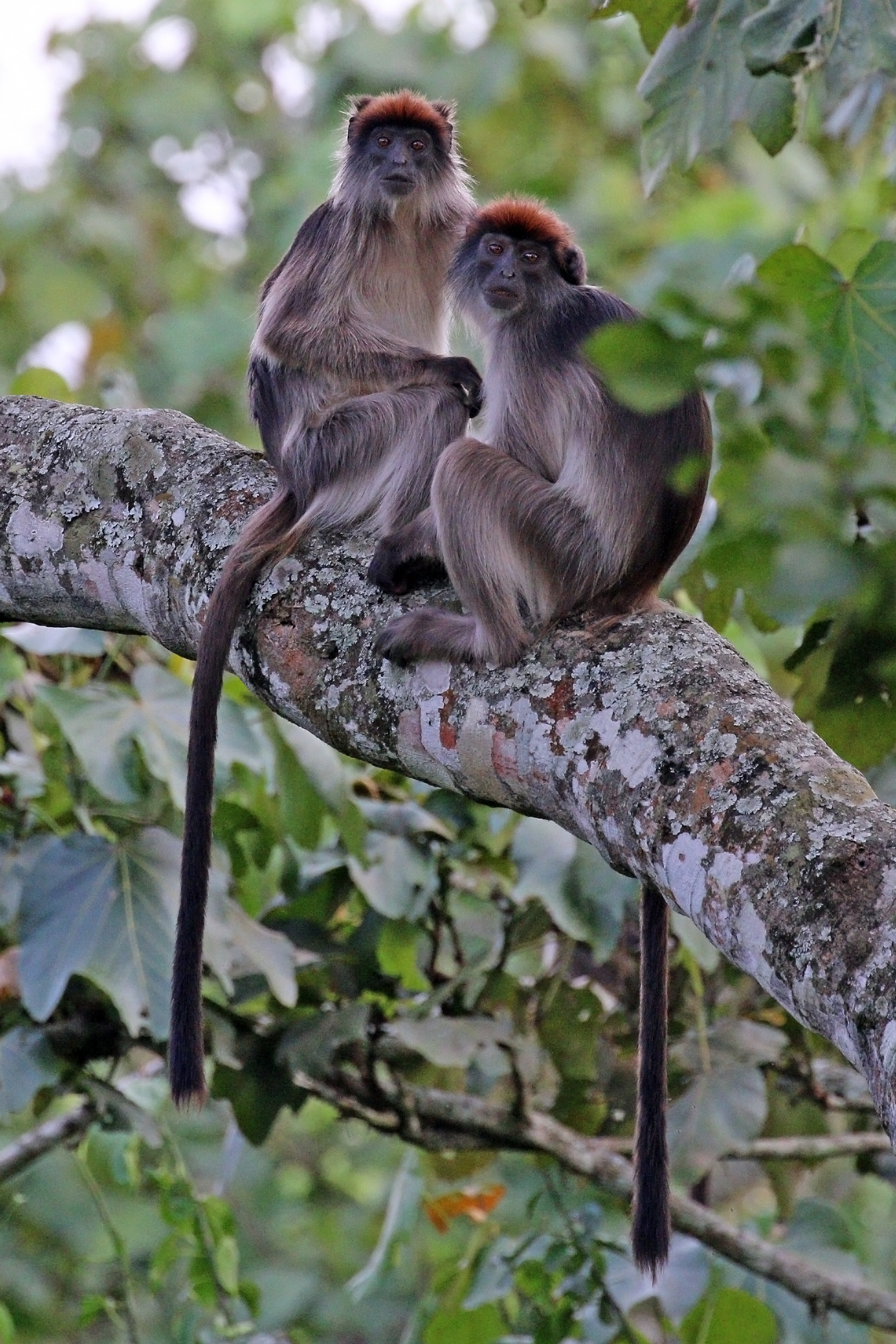
Juveniles, Kihingami Wetlands near Kibale Forest, Uganda

The Ugandan red colobus (Piliocolobus tephrosceles) or ashy red colobus is an endangered species of red colobus monkey, recognised as a distinct species since 2001. There is disagreement however over taxonomy with many considering the Ugandan red colobus to be a subspecies (Procolobus rufomitratus tephrosceles). The Ugandan red colobus is an Old World monkey which is found in five locations across Uganda and Tanzania.

== Taxonomy ==
Recognised as a distinct species in 2001 the Ugandan red colobus had previously been considered a subspecies of P. badius, and later a subspecies of P. foai. There is currently a debate as to whether it should be considered a subspecies of P. rufomitratus.

== Description ==
The Ugandan red colobus has a rust-red cap with a dark grey to black face, although infants are born with completely black faces. There is more variation amongst the coat colours of the Ugandan red colobus with back colour ranging from black to dark grey through to a reddish brown. The sides of the body and the arms and legs are a light grey. They have very long dark to light brown tails which they rely on for balancing when climbing and leaping through the canopy. The Ugandan red colobus has dark grey to black hands and feet and their feet are very long which helps them leap large distances

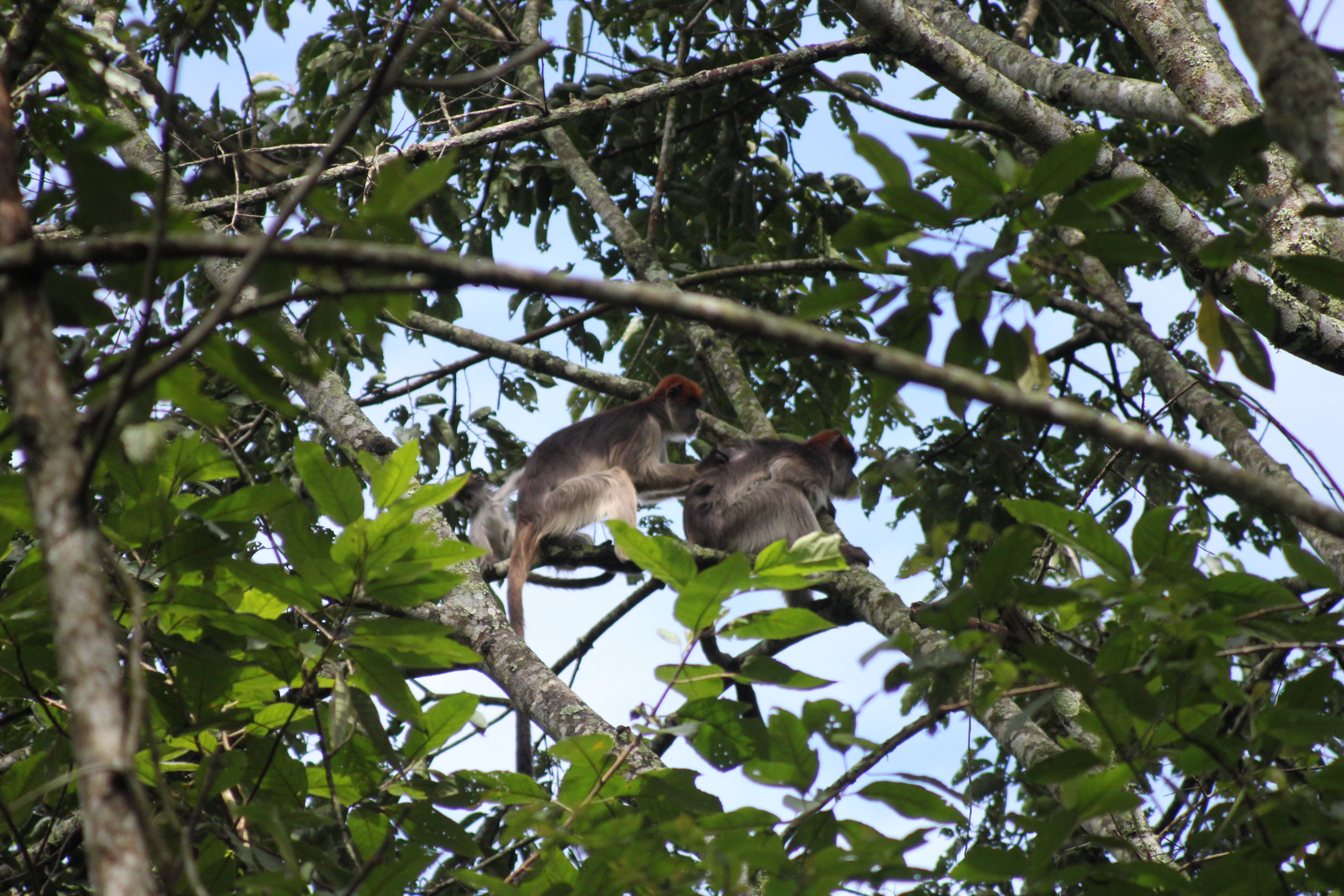
Ugandan red colobus grooming in Kibale National Park, Uganda

The Ugandan red colobus, like all colobus monkeys, has thumbs which are so reduced in size they are almost absent. It is thought this feature may help in brachiation when moving through the canopy.

There is strong sexual dimorphism; the males are much larger than the females. The average male weighs around 10.5 kg (23 lb) and the females weigh around 7 kg (15 lb).

== Distribution and habitat ==
The Ugandan red colobus is found only in Africa. It has a distribution spanning 1,000 km (620 mi) of East Africa but populations are only found in five separate forested areas. These areas are in west Tanzania at the edge of Lake Victoria, in Gombe and Mahale Mountains at the edge of Lake Tanganyika, on the Ufipa Plateau and in west Uganda in Kibale National Park. The Ugandan population is the largest and it has been suggested that this is the only viable population with around 17,000 individuals. It is possible, though yet to be verified, that the Ugandan red colobus might also be located in Rwanda, Burundi and the eastern Democratic Republic of the Congo.

The habitat of the Ugandan red colobus varies by population. Kibale National Park, Uganda, inhabited by the largest population, is a moist evergreen tropical forest. Kibale National Park has been a protected area since 1993. Before 1993 parts of the forest were subject to logging of different degrees of severity. The habitat of the Ugandan red colobus in the Mbisi Forest Reserve on the Ufipa Plateau is fragmented and severely degraded. Unlike Kibale where significant expanses of undisturbed forest remain.

== Behaviour ==
=== Diet ===
The Ugandan red colobus is a folivore so the main component of its diet is leaves. It is not limited to any tree species in particular and different groups in the same forest have shown preferences for different tree species. Although not particularly fussy about which species of tree it eats, the Ugandan red colobus does have a preference for eating young leaves or the petioles of more mature leaves. Although uncommon the Ugandan red colobus has been observed eating bark, seeds and fruits, thought to be an important source of nutrients.

=== Social structure ===
Ugandan red colobus groups are multi-male. Habitat quality and predation can affect group size which range in size from as few as 3 to as large as 85 individuals, although an average group size is around 40 individuals. The size of a group is often determined by how many males are present. Within a social group, males are the stable component and rarely successfully move to another group. Females can disperse to other groups easily and are attracted to groups which contain a higher number of males. In all social groups of Ugandan red colobus females outnumber males. This natural imbalance is further exaggerated by the predatory action of common chimpanzees which single out females and juveniles as prey. Within groups there is a dominance hierarchy with adult males being dominant over adult females, most likely because of their larger size.

Ugandan red colobi often form fission–fusion groups in which a main large group splits into smaller groups to forage. This is beneficial if there is limited food availability such as in more heavily logged or degraded parts of their forest habitat.

Grooming is a social behaviour which is frequently carried out amongst individuals of a group. Females are the main groomers, of males, young and other females. Males groom less often and receive the most grooming unless of a lower rank in the dominance hierarchy.

=== Interspecific interactions ===
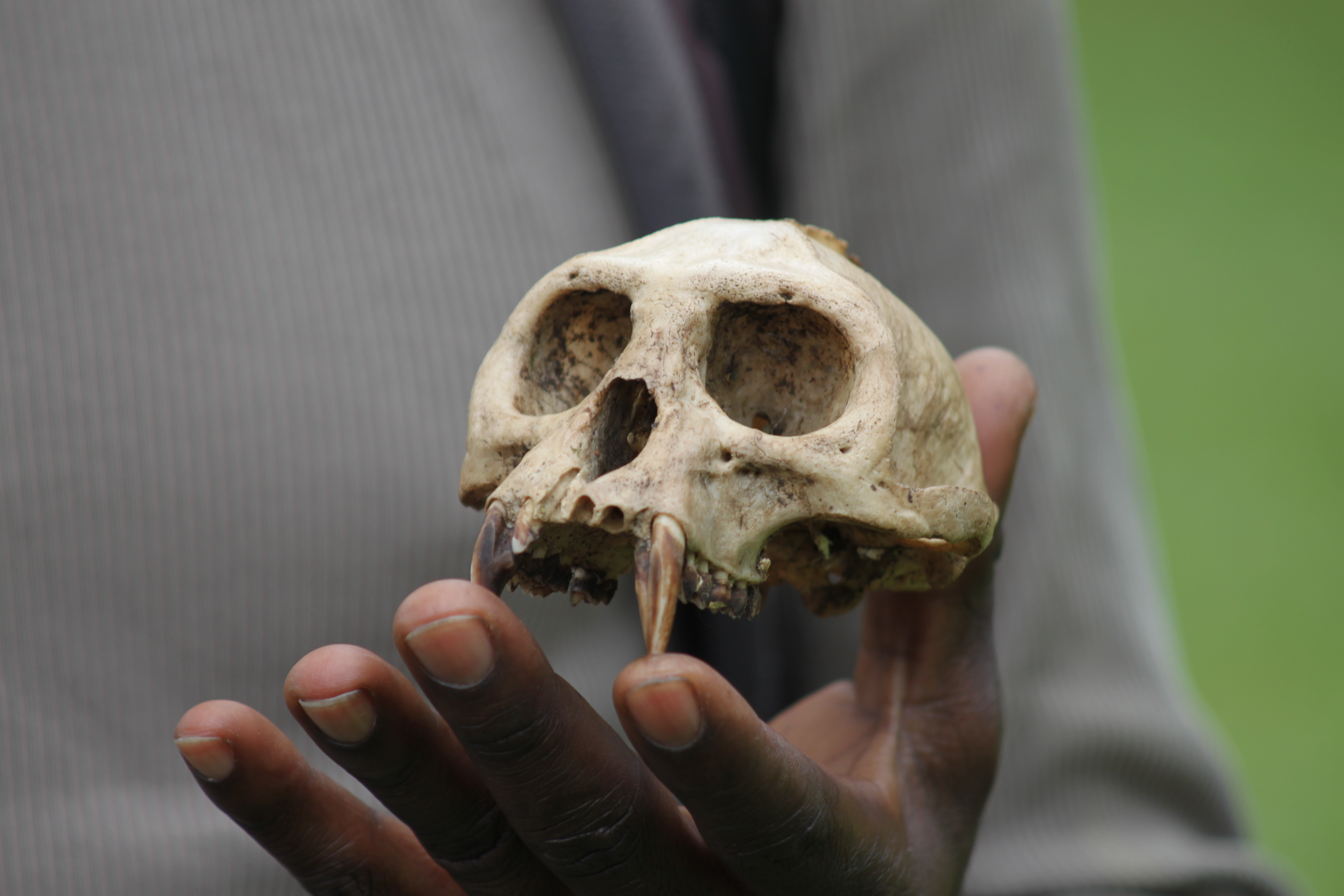
Skull of a Ugandan red colobus

The Ugandan red colobus is often found in association with other species of primates. Groups in parts of Kibale National Park have been seen to be in association with red-tailed monkeys for more than half their time. Although polyspecific associations are most common with red-tailed monkeys, associations have occasionally been observed between the Ugandan red colobus and the gray-cheeked mangabey, the blue monkey and the mantled guereza.

It is not certain why the Ugandan red colobus forms these associations with other species but protection from predators is the most accepted reason. The Ugandan red colobus is less vigilant, looking out for predators less often, when associated with the red-tailed monkey. It also forms these associations more readily when there are a large number of young in the Ugandan red colobus group which implies it may be more protected when with the other species.

=== Predators ===
The Ugandan red colobus has two main predators: the common chimpanzee and the crowned eagle. There are many primate species in Kibale National Park but chimpanzees rarely hunt any species other than the Ugandan red colobus. Each year in Ngogo, part of Kibale National Park, up to 12% of the red colobus population is killed by chimpanzees. Chimpanzees do not hunt Ugandan red colobus all year round, instead they tend to go through bouts of heavy hunting. In response to attacks by a chimpanzee, all members of a Ugandan red colobus group gather together and males assemble to aggressively try and deter the attacking chimpanzee.

Crowned eagles prefer to prey on infants and young juveniles of the Ugandan red colobus. Research has found that both the Ugandan red colobus and the red-tailed monkey are killed less often by crowned eagles than would be expected, based on both monkeys' high abundance in the Kibale National Park. Both monkey species' avoidance of capture has been attributed to their increased defence from forming interspecific associations.

== Reproduction ==
Sexual maturity in males is reached at 5 years and between 4 and 5 years for females of the Ugandan red colobus. The gestation period is 5 to 6 months with females having their first infant between 4 and 5 years old. There is no distinct breeding season with infants being born all year round, however during the rainier months a peak in births is seen to coincide with the flush of new leaves for food.

Both males and females initiate copulation. During copulation other group members sometimes harass the pair by making loud calls, lunging at or leaping around or onto the male's back. The harassers are usually either adult males in intrasexual competition or juveniles if it is their mother which is copulating.

== Conservation status and threats ==
The Ugandan red colobus is classified as Endangered on the IUCN Red List. It has this listing because the populations are very fragmented and there is no movement of individuals between populations. The species is also classified as Endangered because the occurrence of all the populations combined is less than 5,000 km^{2} and this area is at risk of being decreased due to habitat loss and degradation that occurs outside protected areas. The Ugandan red colobus is also listed as Endangered due to there being a decline in numbers, principally due to common chimpanzee predation and habitat loss. Hunting of the Ugandan red colobus by humans is not common and in Kibale, Uganda hunting of all primates was stopped in the 1960s.

The Ugandan red colobus is listed in Appendix II of CITES.
