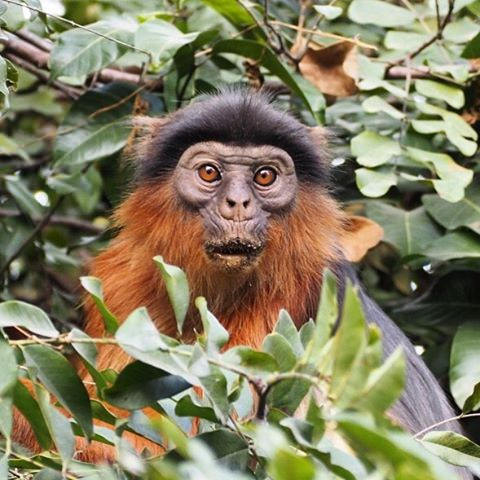

Conservation status
- Endangered (IUCN 3.1)

Scientific classification
- Kingdom: Animalia
- Phylum: Chordata
- Class: Mammalia
- Order: Primates
- Suborder: Haplorhini
- Infraorder: Simiiformes
- Family: Cercopithecidae
- Genus: Piliocolobus
- Species: P. badius
- Subspecies: P. b. temminckii

Trinomial name
- Piliocolobus badius temminckii (Kuhl, 1820)
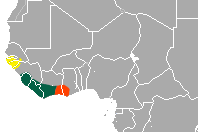
- Temmick's red colobus range shown in yellow

Synonyms
- Piliocolobus temminckii

= Temminck's red colobus =

Subspecies of Old World monkey

Temminck's red colobus (Piliocolobus badius temminckii) is a type of red colobus monkey from the Gambia, Casamance, Guinea-Bissau and northwestern Guinea. It has historically been regarded as a subspecies of the western red colobus (Piliocolobus badius), and the Integrated Taxonomic Information System and Mammal Diversity Database both maintain this classification, but many less recent taxonomies classify it as a separate species (Piliocolobus temminckii).

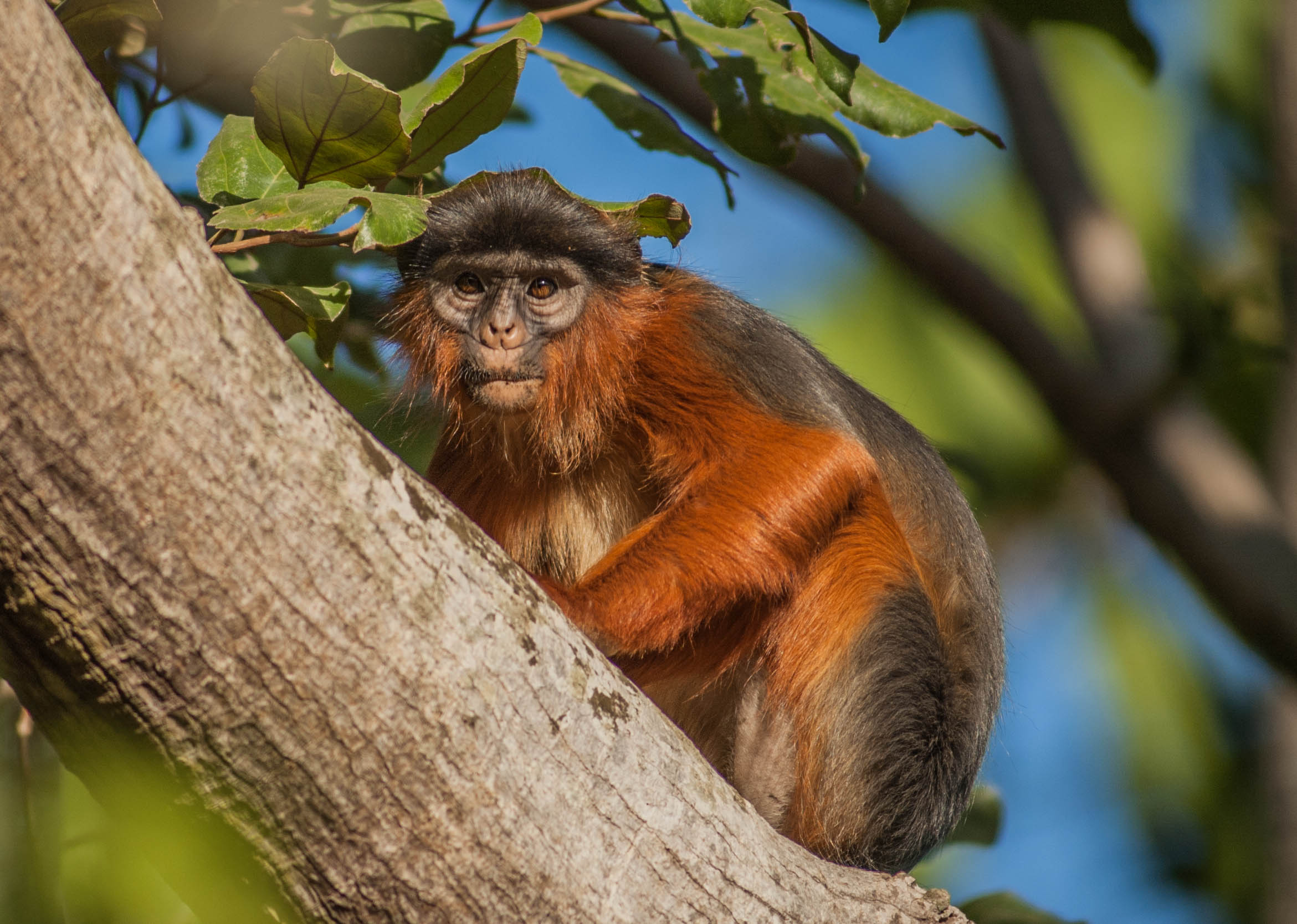

Temminck's red colobus generally lives in dry deciduous and gallery forests. In Senegal it also lives in savannah. No other red colobus lives in savannah. The use of savannah and open areas may be a recent adaptation to deforestation, since researchers in the 1970s always found Temminck's red colobus in tall, dense forest. Temminck's red colobus living in savannahs often associate with green monkeys, and sometimes also associate with patas monkeys and bushbucks for defense against predators. Temminck's red colobus differs from the Western red colobus in that the Western red colobus lives in rainforest rather than dry forest and savannah, which may explain differences in behavior.

The majority of its diet consists of fruit and leaves. Seeds, flowers, buds, bark and nuts account for most of the rest of the diet.

Temminck's red colobus is listed as endangered on the IUCN Red List of Threatened Species. Primary threats include deforestation and hunting.
