= Lang's red colobus =

Conservation status
- Endangered (IUCN 3.1)

Scientific classification
- Kingdom: Animalia
- Phylum: Chordata
- Class: Mammalia
- Infraclass: Placentalia
- Order: Primates
- Family: Cercopithecidae
- Genus: Piliocolobus
- Species: P. langi

Binomial name
- Piliocolobus langi (J. A. Allen, 1925)
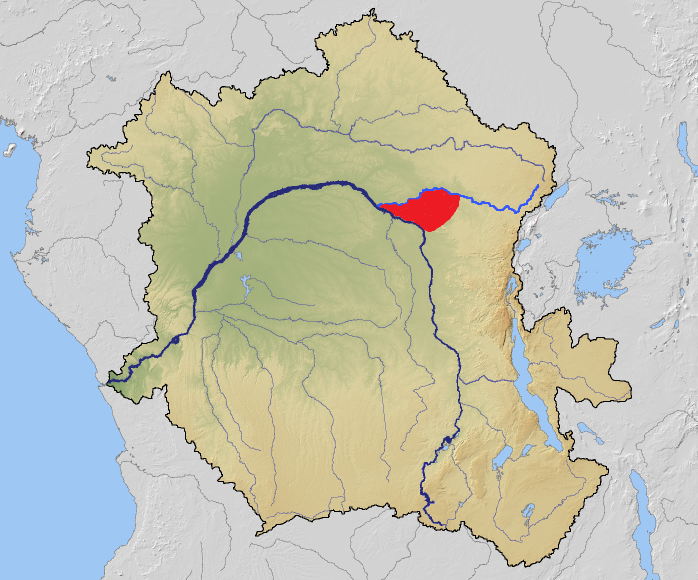
- Lang's red colobus range in the Democratic Republic of the Congo

Synonyms
- Piliocolobus foai ellioti Piliocolobus rufomitratus ellioti

Species of Old World monkey

Lang's red colobus (Piliocolobus langi) is a species of red colobus monkey. Historically, it had been treated as a subspecies of the Central African red colobus, (P. foai) but more recent taxonomies generally treat it as a separate species.

Lang's red colobus lives in lowland rainforest in the northeastern portion of the Democratic Republic of the Congo between the Lualaba River and the Aruwimi-Ituri River. It eats leaves, fruit, flowers, buds and possibly seeds. Males have a head and body length of about 50 cm (20 in) with a tail length of about 66.5 cm (26.2 in). Females have a head and body length of about 48.5 cm (19.1 in) with a tail length of between 44 and 66.5 cm (17.3 and 26.2 in). Males weigh about 9 kg (20 lb) and females weigh about 7.7 kg (17 lb).
