= Lomami red colobus =

Conservation status
- Endangered (IUCN 3.1)

Scientific classification
- Kingdom: Animalia
- Phylum: Chordata
- Class: Mammalia
- Order: Primates
- Family: Cercopithecidae
- Genus: Piliocolobus
- Species: P. parmentieri

Binomial name
- Piliocolobus parmentieri (Colyn & Verheyen, 1987)
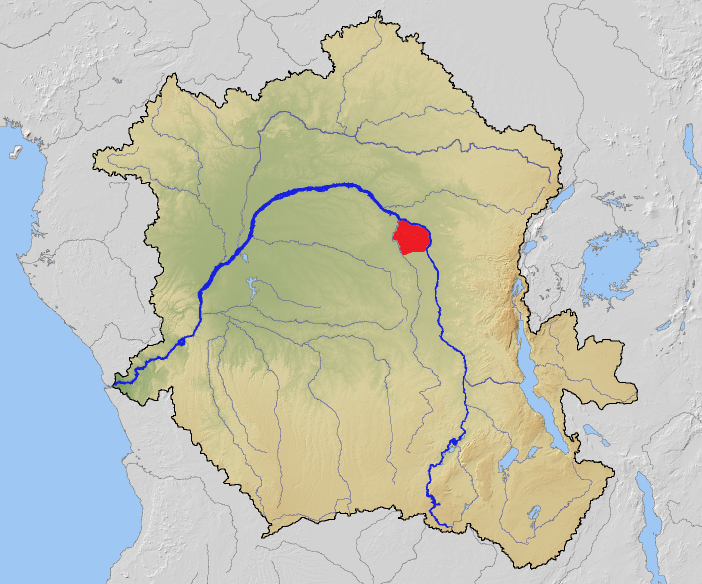
- Distribution of the Lomami red colobus within the Democratic Republic of the Congo

Synonyms
- Piliocolobus foai parmentierorum

Species of Old World monkey

The Lomami red colobus (Piliocolobus parmentieri) is a species of red colobus monkey from central Africa. Historically, it had been treated as a subspecies of the Central African red colobus (P. foai), but more recent taxonomies generally treat it as a separate species.

The Lomami red colobus has a limited range in lowland tropical rainforest between the Lomani River and the Lualaba River in central Democratic Republic of the Congo. Its range extends as far south as the Ruiki River and the Lutanga River. It eats leaves, fruit, flowers, buds and possibly seeds. Males weigh about 9 kg (20 lb), and females weigh about 7.5 kg (17 lb).
