= Semliki red colobus =

Conservation status
- Vulnerable (IUCN 3.1)

Scientific classification
- Kingdom: Animalia
- Phylum: Chordata
- Class: Mammalia
- Order: Primates
- Family: Cercopithecidae
- Genus: Piliocolobus
- Species: P. semlikiensis

Binomial name
- Piliocolobus semlikiensis (Colyn, 1991)
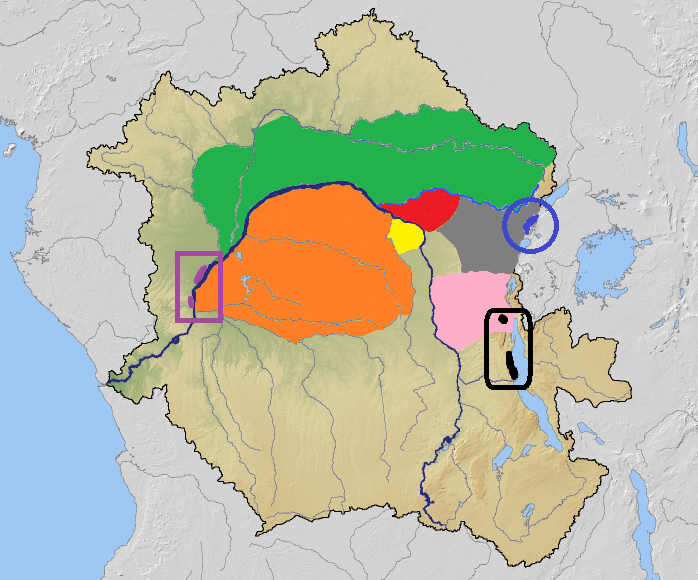
- Semliki red colobus range shown in dark blue

Synonyms
- Piliocolobus foai semlikiensis

Species of Old World monkey

The Semliki red colobus (Piliocolobus semlikiensis) is a type of red colobus monkey from central Africa. Historically it has been treated as a subspecies of the Central African red colobus (P. foai) but more recent taxonomies generally treat it as a separate species.

The Semliki red colobus lives in ironwood forest in a portion of the northeastern Democratic Republic of the Congo between the Semliki River valley and the Ruwenzori Mountains. It may also live in a small area of Uganda.
