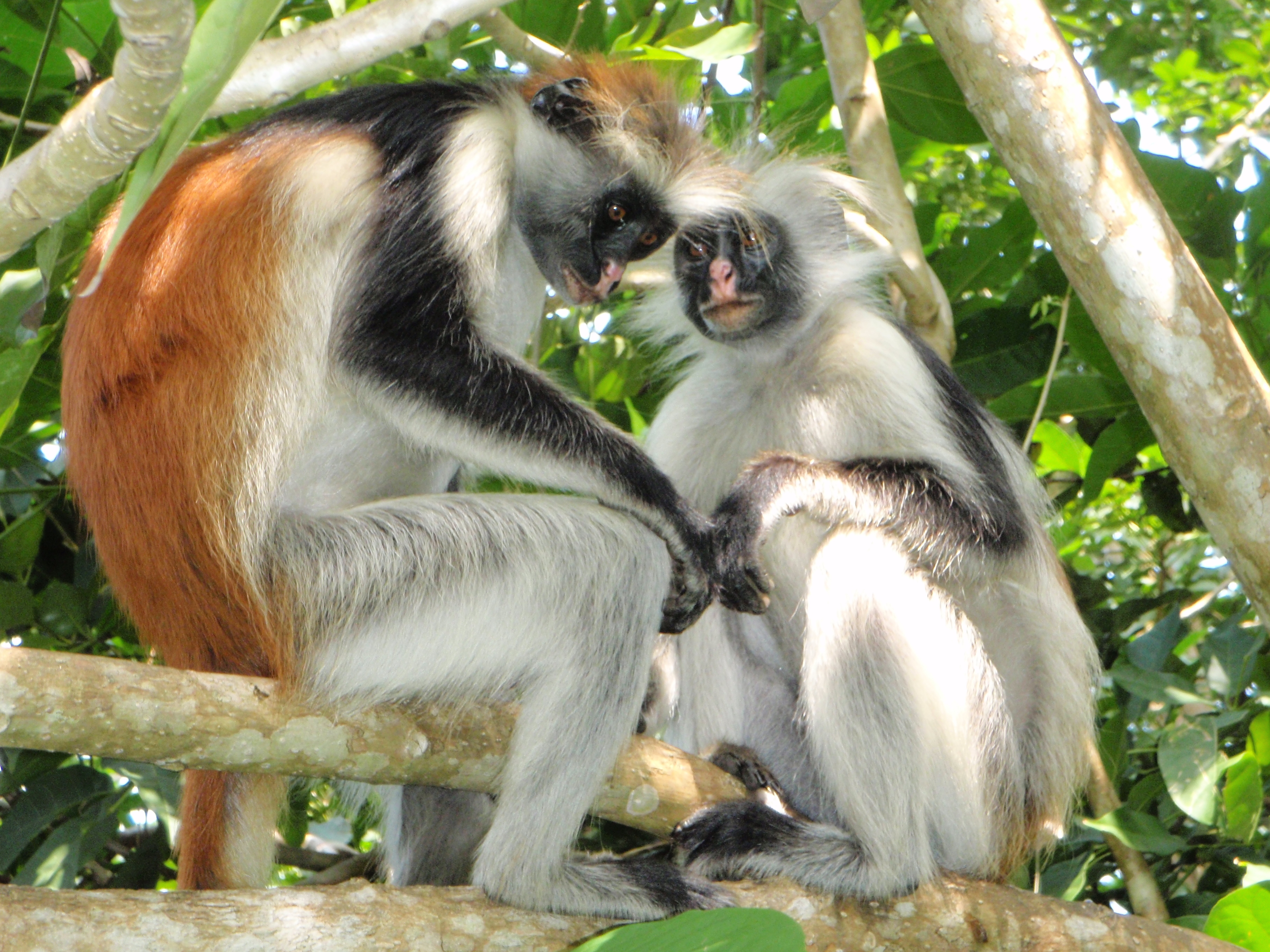
- Zanzibar red colobus

Scientific classification
- Kingdom: Animalia
- Phylum: Chordata
- Class: Mammalia
- Order: Primates
- Suborder: Haplorhini
- Infraorder: Simiiformes
- Family: Cercopithecidae
- Subfamily: Colobinae
- Tribe: Colobini
- Genus: Piliocolobus; Rochebrune, 1887

Type species
- Simia (Cercopithecus) badius Kerr, 1792

Species
- See text

= Red colobus =

Genus of Old World monkeys

Red colobuses are Old World monkeys of the genus Piliocolobus. It was formerly considered a subgenus within the genus Procolobus, which is now restricted to the olive colobus. They are closely related to the black-and-white colobus monkeys (genus Colobus), and some species are often found in groups with the blue monkey. The western red colobus is frequently hunted by the common chimpanzee.

The members of this genus are found in western, central and eastern Africa, and the species have largely allo- or parapatric distributions. They are primarily arboreal and most are restricted to humid forests, but the Zanzibar red colobus prefers coastal thickets and scrub. Red colobuses are highly sensitive to hunting and habitat destruction, and have been referred to as probably the most threatened taxonomic group of primates in Africa. If following the taxonomic treatment advocated in Mammal Species of the World, all species except the Udzungwa, Semliki, Oustalet's and Thollon's red colobus monkeys (which are vulnerable) are assessed by the IUCN as endangered or critically endangered. Due to this sensitivity, it has been argued that they are indicator species for the health of Africa's tropical forests, leading researchers to urge that they be conserved as umbrella species.

== Social behavior ==
Groups often establish a dominance hierarchy determined by aggressive behavior. Food, grooming, and sexual partners are distributed amongst higher-ranking individuals initially, followed by lower-ranking individuals. They live in large troops which can number up to 80 individuals, the average being somewhere around 20 to 40 monkeys. These groups tend to have more females than males at a 2:1 ratio. The few male monkeys in the troop usually stay with their original group, but the females have a tendency to move together in small numbers, probably in close familial relationships, between troops. Red colobus monkeys have overlapping ranges with other troops. Interactions between troops can be either tense, though passive, or violent, with one troop trying to supplant the other. These fights are usually based on a number of factors including physical condition, fighting ability, and the number of males in the opposing troop. Females are also known to take part in these competitions for dominance, and often fight together. Mother-infant bonds among the red colobus are quite strong, as they are with most primates. The mothers are usually reluctant to allow other females from their troop to carry their babies. This may be because many of the females in a troop are not related as they move between groups quite frequently.

Another remarkable behavior occurs when red colobus monkeys reach their restless and somewhat nomadic adolescence. This period is when the young monkeys leave their natal troops and look for another troop to join. This is not easy, as most troops are very suspicious and can get deadly when new monkeys try to join. The red colobus monkeys have adapted their behavior by joining troops of green monkeys that are near the potential red colobus troops that they wish to join, and living amongst them in order to spy on their potential new families. In one notable case, an adolescent male red colobus spent two years with a green monkey troop in order to spy in safety on a prospective troop in this manner.

== Diet ==
The diet of red colobus monkeys consists mainly of young leaves, flowers, and unripe fruit. They are also known to eat charcoal or clay to help combat the cyanide some leaves may contain. This medicinal cure for the plants they eat appears to be passed on from mother to child. However, their stomachs are able to digest some toxic plants that other primates cannot. Red colobus monkeys are extraordinarily adapted to their entirely vegetarian and widely varied diet. They have special salivary glands, which are larger and produce more specialized saliva to help facilitate the breakdown of leaves before they reach the digestive tract. The stomach of the red colobus is also sacculated into four chambers (similar to unrelated ungulates) and larger than those of other monkeys of a comparative size. This allows for longer digestion, so that most of the nutrients can be gleaned from the relatively low nutrient food.

== Chimpanzee predation ==
Research indicates that chimpanzee predation may be a major selection factor on some red colobus populations. Although chimpanzees primarily eat fruit, leaves, and insects, if the opportunity to eat meat arises, they will pursue it. In addition to sustenance, evidence suggests that chimpanzees prey on red colobus to reinforce social status, as well as to attract sexual partners. When under attack, the red colobus males congregate to defend their group, while the females gather their infants and try to escape. Larger groups of red colobuses have an increased likelihood of attracting chimpanzees, but they also tend to have more defending males, making it harder for chimpanzees to hunt successfully. Furthermore, while under attack, male colobuses shout an alarm call to let others know if chimpanzees or other predators are in the area. The frequency of these shouts is increased with the number of females and infants in the group as a way to spread the news of an expected attack. At Gombe National Park in Tanzania C.B. Stanford estimated that the Gombe chimps kill up to 100 colobus monkeys a year, which he believes to be close to a fifth of the colobus population within their territory. Another study confirms that chimpanzees are annually responsible for 6-12 percent of red colobus female and infant death in Ngogo, Kibale National Park, which has one of the largest populations of chimpanzees. It seems that chimpanzees tend to favor the red colobus as prey whenever the two are in the same territory, hunting in groups of up to 20 individual chimps. During these hunts in Tai, Gombe, Ngogo, and Mahale National Parks, ≥ 87 percent of the hunts made more than one kill. The highest amount of kills seen during this study was 13, most of which were infants.

== Species ==
Genus Piliocolobus – Rochebrune, 1887 – sixteen species
Common name	Scientific name and subspecies	Range	Size and ecology	IUCN status and estimated population
Bouvier's red colobus	P. bouvieri Rochebrune, 1887	Congo (in purple on left)	Size: 41–70 cm (16–28 in) long, plus 42–80 cm (17–31 in) tail Habitat: Forest Diet: Fruit, seeds, and leaves	EN Unknown
Foa's red colobus	P. foai (Pousargues, 1899)	Congo (in black, bottom right)	Size: 41–70 cm (16–28 in) long, plus 42–80 cm (17–31 in) tail Habitat: Forest Diet: Fruit, seeds, and leaves	EN Unknown
Lang's red colobus	P. langi (J. A. Allen, 1925)	Congo	Size: 41–70 cm (16–28 in) long, plus 42–80 cm (17–31 in) tail Habitat: Forest Diet: Fruit, seeds, and leaves	EN Unknown
Lomami red colobus	P. parmentieri (Colyn & Verheyen, 1987)	Congo	Size: 41–70 cm (16–28 in) long, plus 42–80 cm (17–31 in) tail Habitat: Forest Diet: Fruit, seeds, and leaves	EN Unknown
Miss Waldron's red colobus	P. waldronae (Hayman, 1936)	Western Africa	Size: 47–63 cm (19–25 in) long, plus 52–75 cm (20–30 in) tail Habitat: Forest Diet: Fruit, seeds, leaves, buds, and flowers	CR Unknown
Niger Delta red colobus	P. epieni (Grubb & Powell, 1999)	Western Africa	Size: 41–70 cm (16–28 in) long, plus 42–80 cm (17–31 in) tail Habitat: Forest Diet: Fruit, seeds, and leaves	CR Unknown
Oustalet's red colobus	P. oustaleti (Trouessart, 1906)	Congo (in green)	Size: 41–70 cm (16–28 in) long, plus 42–80 cm (17–31 in) tail Habitat: Forest Diet: Fruit, seeds, and leaves	VU Unknown
Pennant's colobus	P. pennantii (Waterhouse, 1838)	Western Africa	Size: 53–63 cm (21–25 in) long, plus 60–70 cm (24–28 in) tail Habitat: Forest Diet: Leaves and shoots, as well as seeds and fruit	CR Unknown
Preuss's red colobus	P. preussi Matschie, 1900	Western Africa	Size: 41–70 cm (16–28 in) long, plus 42–80 cm (17–31 in) tail Habitat: Forest Diet: Fruit, seeds, and leaves	CR Unknown
Semliki red colobus	P. semlikiensis (Colyn, 1991)	Congo (in dark blue on right)	Size: 41–70 cm (16–28 in) long, plus 42–80 cm (17–31 in) tail Habitat: Forest Diet: Fruit, seeds, and leaves	VU Unknown
Tana River red colobus	P. rufomitratus (Peters, 1879)	Kenya	Size: 45–67 cm (18–26 in) long, plus 52–80 cm (20–31 in) tail Habitat: Forest, shrubland, and inland wetlands Diet: Leaves, fruit, and seeds, as well as flowers	CR Unknown
Thollon's red colobus	P. tholloni (A. Milne-Edwards, 1886)	Congo (in orange)	Size: 41–70 cm (16–28 in) long, plus 42–80 cm (17–31 in) tail Habitat: Forest Diet: Leaves, fruit, and seeds, as well as flowers	VU Unknown
Udzungwa red colobus	P. gordonorum Matschie, 1900	Southeastern Africa	Size: 41–70 cm (16–28 in) long, plus 42–80 cm (17–31 in) tail Habitat: Forest Diet: Fruit, seeds, and leaves	VU 35,000
Ugandan red colobus	P. tephrosceles (Elliot, 1907)	Eastern Africa	Size: 41–70 cm (16–28 in) long, plus 42–80 cm (17–31 in) tail Habitat: Forest and savanna Diet: Fruit, seeds, and leaves	EN Unknown
Western red colobus	P. badius (Kerr, 1792) Three subspecies: P. b. badius (Bay red colobus); P. b. temminckii (Temminck's red colobus)	Western Africa	Size: 45–67 cm (18–26 in) long, plus 52–80 cm (20–31 in) tail Habitat: Forest and savanna Diet: Leaves, seeds, unripe fruit, and shoots	EN Unknown
Zanzibar red colobus	P. kirkii (Gray, 1868)	Eastern Africa	Size: 41–70 cm (16–28 in) long, plus 42–80 cm (17–31 in) tail Habitat: Forest and shrubland Diet: Leaves, fruit, and seeds, as well as flowers	EN 5,900

Colin Groves did not recognize all these species in the 2005 Mammal Species of the World, but he subsequently agreed that additional species should be recognized. These species are generally agreed upon although different authors may use slightly different taxonomies. For example, the Integrated Taxonomic Information System, IUCN Red List, and Mammal Diversity Database list Temminck's red colobus as a subspecies of the Western red colobus, Piliocolobus badius temminckii, but The Handbook of Mammals of the World regarded it as a full species. In addition to the recognized species, there is also a hybrid zone in the eastern Democratic Republic of Congo where hybrids of several local species exist.

== Sources ==
- Kingdon, Jonathan (2015). The Kingdon Field Guide to African Mammals (Second ed.). Bloomsbury Publishing. ISBN 978-1-4729-2531-2.
