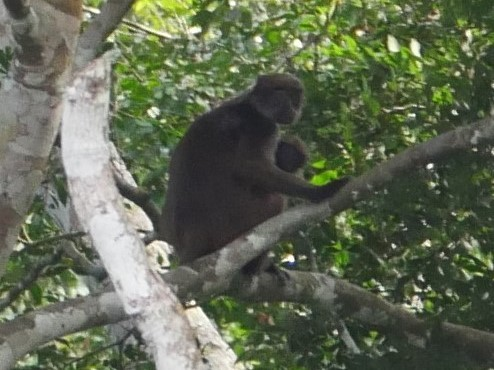

Conservation status
- Vulnerable (IUCN 3.1)

Scientific classification
- Kingdom: Animalia
- Phylum: Chordata
- Class: Mammalia
- Infraclass: Placentalia
- Order: Primates
- Family: Cercopithecidae
- Genus: Piliocolobus
- Species: P. oustaleti

Binomial name
- Piliocolobus oustaleti (Trouessart, 1906)
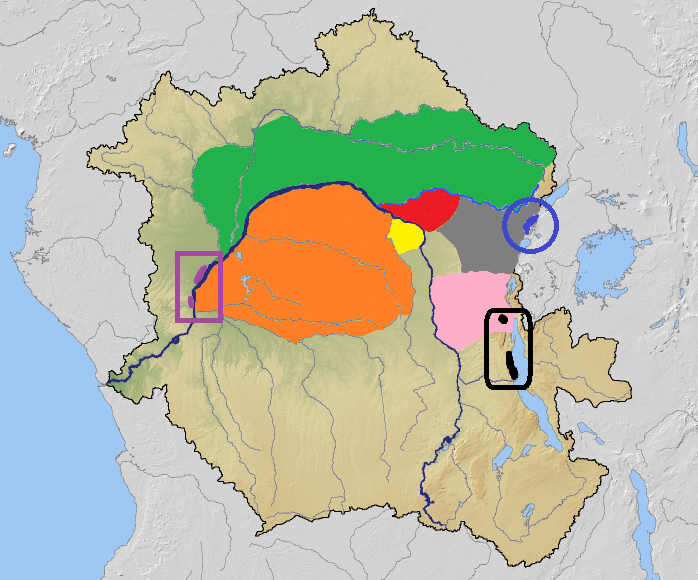
- Oustalet's red colobus shown in green

= Oustalet's red colobus =

Species of Old World monkey

Oustalet's red colobus (Piliocolobus oustaleti) is a species of red colobus monkey. It lives in various types of forest in southern South Sudan, southern Central African Republic, northern Democratic Republic of the Congo and northeastern Republic of the Congo. It eats leaves, fruit, flowers, buds and possibly seeds. Males have a head and body length of between 45.9 and 68 cm (18.1 and 26.8 in) with a tail length of between 55.5 and 73 cm (21.9 and 28.7 in). Females have a head and body length of between 52 and 64 cm (20 and 25 in) with a tail length of between 68 and 73 cm (27 and 29 in). Males weigh about 12.5 kg (28 lb) and females weigh about 8.2 kg (18 lb).
