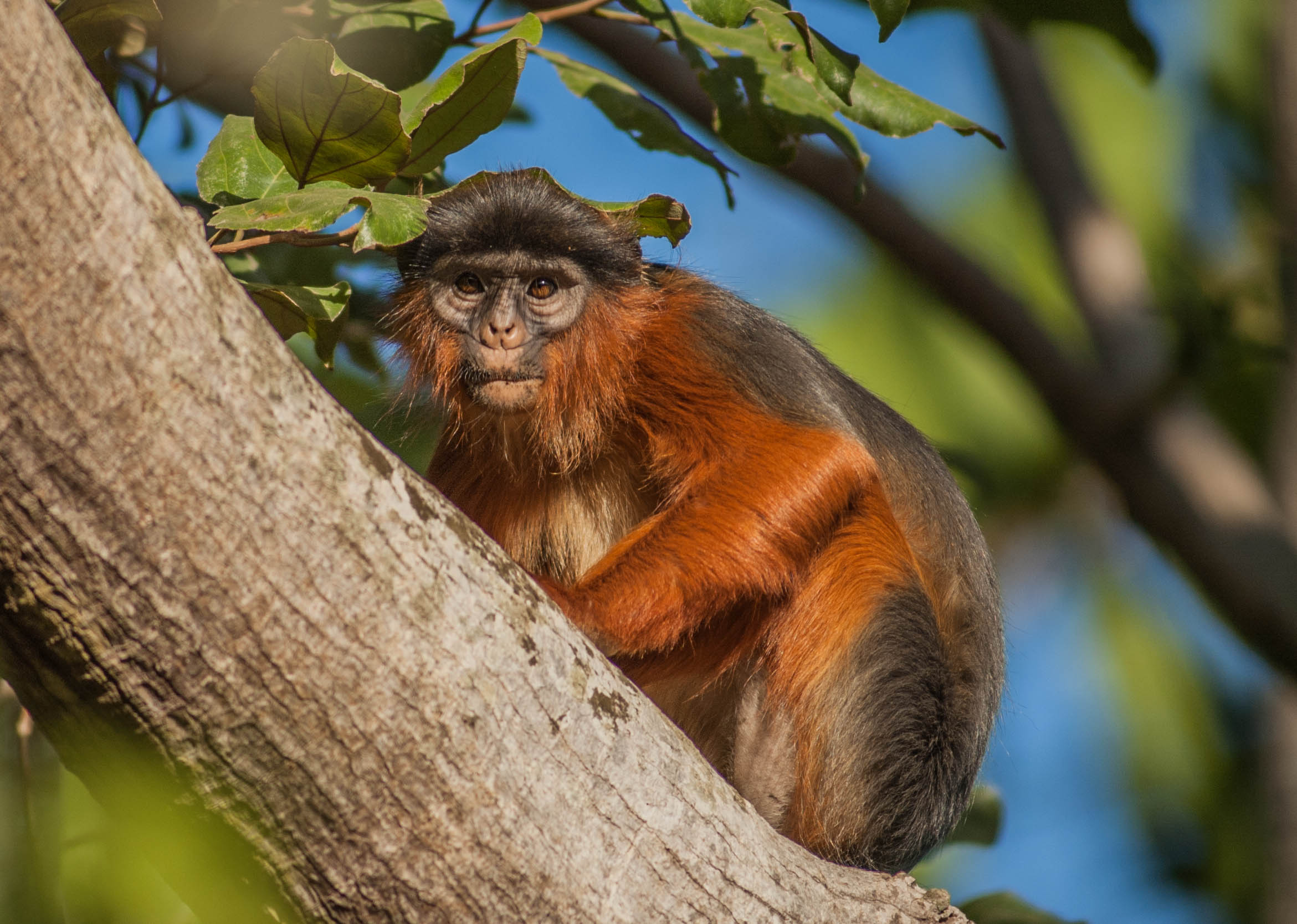

Conservation status
- Endangered (IUCN 3.1)

Scientific classification
- Kingdom: Animalia
- Phylum: Chordata
- Class: Mammalia
- Order: Primates
- Family: Cercopithecidae
- Genus: Piliocolobus
- Species: P. badius

Binomial name
- Piliocolobus badius (Kerr, 1792)
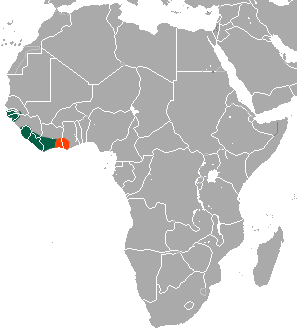
- Western red colobus range (green — extant, orange — possibly extinct)

= Western red colobus =

Species of Old World monkey

The western red colobus (Piliocolobus badius), also known as the bay red colobus, rust red colobus or Upper Guinea red colobus, is a species of Old World monkey in West African forests from Senegal to Ghana. All other species of red colobuses have formerly been considered subspecies of P. badius. The monkey is a frequent prey of the common chimpanzee. In 1994, western red colobus monkeys infected many chimpanzees with Ebola virus after being hunted and consumed by the chimps.

== Subspecies ==
The western red colobus has two subspecies, including the nominate:

- Bay red colobus, Piliocolobus badius badius
- Temminck's red colobus, Piliocolobus badius temminckii

Both subspecies are endangered.

== Description ==
The western red colobus grows to a head-and-body length of 450 to 670 mm (18 to 26 in) with a tail of 520 to 800 mm (20 to 31 in), and a weight of between 5 and 11 kg (11 and 24 lb). It has red or chestnut-brown head and limbs and black, slatey-grey or dark brown upper parts. It does not have long fringes of hair, or tufts of hair on the tail. Compared to monkeys in the genus Colobus, the nostrils are V-shaped, the digits are long and the big toe is short.

== Distribution and habitat ==
The red colobus is endemic to tropical West Africa. Its range includes various fragmentary populations in Sierra Leone, and contiguous populations in Liberia, Guinea and western Ivory Coast. It is unclear exactly where the ranges of P. b. badius and P. b. temminckii meet, but P. b. badius populations are separated from P. b. waldronae by the Bandama River in Ivory Coast. The red colobus is an arboreal species, typically found in primary rainforest, but also inhabiting secondary forest and gallery forest.

== Ecology ==
The red colobus lives in colonies of between twelve and eighty members. There are usually several males and up to three times this number of adult females. There is a social hierarchy, giving access to food, space and grooming.
