= List of primates by population =

This is a list of primate species by estimated global population. This list is not comprehensive as not all primates have had their numbers quantified.

Unless specified in the Notes section, primary population values given are for number of mature individuals.

Common name	Binomial name	Population	Status	Trend	Notes	Image
Hainan black crested gibbon (Hainan gibbon)	Nomascus hainanus	10	CR	Steady	Population was estimated at over 2,000 in the late 1950s. Current total population is estimated to be more than 25 individuals.	
Cat Ba langur (Cat Ba hooded black leaf monkey)	Trachypithecus poliocephalus	30-35	CR	▲	Total confirmed population (2016) is 51-54 individuals.	
Eastern black crested gibbon (Cao-vit gibbon)	Nomascus nasutus	45–47	CR	▼	Previously thought to be possibly extinct, rediscovered in 2002. Total population is estimated to be 129 individuals.	
Golden bamboo lemur	Hapalemur aureus	50-249	CR	▼	Total population is estimated to be 600–1,000 individuals.	
Tonkin snub-nosed monkey	Rhinopithecus avunculus	80-100	CR	▼	Total population is estimated to be 200-250 individuals.	
Barbara Brown's titi monkey (Blond titi monkey)	Callicebus barbarabrownae	100-250	CR	▼	Total population is estimated to be less than 1,000 individuals.	
Tana River mangabey	Cercocebus galeritus	100-1,000	CR	▼	Total population is estimated to be 1,000 individuals.	
Perrier's sifaka	Propithecus perrieri	125	CR	▼	Total population is estimated to be less than 500 individuals.	
Popa langur	Trachypithecus popa	135–176	CR	▼	Values given are for mature individuals.	
Gray snub-nosed monkey	Rhinopithecus brelichi	200	CR	▼	Total population is estimated to be 750 individuals.	
Raffles' banded langur	Presbytis femoralis	200–250	CR	▼	Total population is estimated to be "only a few hundred individuals."	
Sarawak surili (Bornean banded langur)	Presbytis chrysomelas	200–500	CR	▼	Values given are for total population.	
White-headed langur (White-headed black langur)	Trachypithecus leucocephalus	230-250	CR	▼	Total population is estimated to be 600 individuals.	
Delacour's langur	Trachypithecus delacouri	234-275	CR	▼	Values given are for total population.	
Arunachal macaque	Macaca munzala	240-250	EN	▼	Total population is at least 569 individuals.	
Silky sifaka	Propithecus candidus	249	CR	▼	Value given is a maximum estimate for number of mature individuals.	
Superagüi lion tamarin (Black-faced lion tamarin)	Leontopithecus caissara	250	CR	▼	Total population is estimated to be, at maximum, 400 individuals.	
Black lion tamarin	Leontopithecus chrysopygus	> 250	EN	▼	Total population is estimated to be 1,600 individuals.	
Coimbra Filho's titi	Callicebus coimbrai	250-2,499	EN	▼	Total population is estimated to be 4,500 individuals.	
Mentawai langur	Presbytis potenziani	300–1,200	CR	▼	Values given are for total population.	
Myanmar snub-nosed monkey	Rhinopithecus strykeri	350-400	CR	▼	Total population is estimated to be less than 950 individuals.	
Greater bamboo lemur	Prolemur simus	500	CR	▼	Total population is estimated to be approximately 1,000 individuals.	
Blond capuchin (Blonde capuchin)	Cebus flavius	500	EN	▼		
Gray-shanked douc	Pygathrix cinerea	550–700	CR	▼	Values given are for total population.	
Northern muriqui	Brachyteles hypoxanthus	< 1,000	CR	▼	Value given is for total population.	
Black snub-nosed monkey	Rhinopithecus bieti	< 1,000	EN	▼	Total population is estimated to be less than 2,000 individuals.	
Southern muriqui	Brachyteles arachnoides	1,100-1,200	CR	▼	Values given are for total population.	
Kipunji	Rungwecebus kipunji	1,117	EN	▼	Value given is for total population.	
Sanje mangabey	Cercocebus sanjei	1,300-3,500	EN	▼	Values given are for total population.	
Siau Island tarsier	Tarsius tumpara	1,358–12,470	CR	▼	Values given are for total population.	
Golden lion tamarin	Leontopithecus rosalia	1,400	EN	▼	Total wild population is estimated to be 3,700 individuals. 372 individuals are currently held in captivity.	
Kashmir gray langur	Semnopithecus ajax	1,400-1,500	EN	▼	Values given are a maximum estimate for number of mature individuals.	
Black crested gibbon	Nomascus concolor	1,500	CR	▼	Value given is for mature individuals.	
Sangihe tarsier	Tarsius sangirensis	1,505–2,795	EN	▼	Values given are for total population; do not include "brush" habitat of unknown suitability. If this species does inhabit this habitat, upper bound could be as high as 52,734 individuals.	
Cotton-top tamarin (Cotton-headed tamarin)	Saguinus oedipus	2,000	CR	▼	Total population is estimated to be 7,400 individuals.	
François' langur	Trachypithecus francoisi	2,000–2,100	EN	▼	Estimate for mature individuals.	
Red slender loris	Loris tardigradus	2,000-2,250	EN	▼	Total population is estimated to be less than 2,650 individuals.	
Pagai Island macaque	Macaca pagensis	2,100–3,700	CR	▼	Values given are for mature individuals. Numbered 15,000 in 1980.	
Javan surili	Presbytis comata	2,300–5,500	VU	▼	Total population is estimated to be 5,000–12,000 individuals.	
Javan fuscous leaf monkey	Presbytis fredericae	2,300-7,800	VU	▼	Total population is estimated to be 5,000–17,000 individuals. Some taxonomists classify this species as a subspecies of Javan surili.	
Lion-tailed macaque	Macaca silenus	2,400-2,500	EN	▼	Total population is estimated to be 4,000 individuals.	
Indochinese gray langur	Trachypithecus crepusculus	2,400–2,500	EN	▼	Values given are for mature individuals.	
Golden-headed lion tamarin	Leontopithecus chrysomelas	< 2,500	EN	▼	Value given is the most recent estimate for number of mature individuals.	
Lac Alaotra bamboo lemur (Alaotra reed lemur)	Hapalemur alaotrensis	2,500	CR	▼	Value given is for total population.	
Eastern gorilla	Gorilla beringei	2,600	CR	▼	Total population is estimated to be less than 5,000 individuals. As of 2015, subspecies populations for eastern lowland gorillas (G. b. graueri) and mountain gorillas (G. b. beringei) are 3,800 and 1,000 individuals, respectively.	
Silvery gibbon	Hylobates moloch	4,000-4,500	EN	▼	Values given are for total population from 2008 IUCN Assessment. Current IUCN Assessment does not provide a population estimate.	
Golden-crowned sifaka	Propithecus tattersalli	4,000-5,000	CR	▼	Total population is estimated to be 11,000-26,000 individuals.	
Siberut macaque	Macaca siberu	4,639–18,438	EN	▼	Values given are an estimate for total population living in Siberut National Park. Total population is almost certainly slightly higher.	
Zanzibar red colobus	Procolobus kirkii	5,862	EN	▼	Value given is for total population.	
Gee's golden langur	Trachypithecus geei	6,000–6,500	EN	▼	Values given are for mature individuals.	
Muna-Buton macaque (Buton macaque)	Macaca brunnescens	6,221–18,435	VU	▼	Values given are an estimate of total population from 2007.	
Pig-tailed langur (Pig-tailed snub-nosed langur)	Simias concolor	6,700–17,300	CR	▼	Values given are an estimate of total population from 2006.	
Gray-headed lemur (White-collared lemur)	Eulemur cinereiceps	7,265	CR	▼	Maximum total population estimate for the year 2000 was 7,265±2,268. Population is now expected to be much lower.	
Madame Berthe's mouse lemur	Microcebus berthae	8,000	CR	▼	Value given is a maximum estimate of total population from 2005.	
Natuna Island surili	Presbytis natunae	9,000	VU	▼	Total population is estimated to be less than 10,000 individuals.	
Nilgiri langur	Semnopithecus johnii	9,500-10,000	VU	Steady	Total population is estimated to be less than 20,000 individuals.	
Moor macaque	Macaca maura	< 10,000	EN	▼	Total population is unknown, having last been estimated as less than 10,000 individuals in 1999.	
Siberut langur	Presbytis siberu	11,014–27,439	EN	▼	Values given are estimate for total population living in Siberut National Park. Total population is almost certainly slightly higher.	
Sumatran orangutan	Pongo abelii	13,846	CR	▼	Value given is an estimate of total population.	
Barbary macaque	Macaca sylvanus	15,000	EN	▼	Value given is an estimate of total population in 1999; may be an underestimate.	
Bonobo	Pan paniscus	15,000–20,000	EN	▼	Values given are a minimum estimate for total population.	
Northern giant mouse lemur	Mirza zaza	16,500–177,500	VU	▼	Values given are for total population, assuming different rates of habitat occupancy.	
Kloss's gibbon	Hylobates klossii	17,500	EN	▼	Value given is for total population.	
Capped langur	Trachypithecus pileatus	18,600	VU	▼	Values given are for total population.	
Golden snub-nosed monkey	Rhinopithecus roxellana	20,000	EN	▼	Value given is an estimate of total population, compiled from estimates of three subspecies.	
Red-eared guenon (Red-eared monkey)	Cercopithecus erythrotis	20,000	VU	▼	Value given is an estimate of total population from 2008 IUCN estimate. Current IUCN estimate does not provide a population estimate.	
Roosmalens' dwarf marmoset (Black-crowned dwarf marmoset)	Callibella humilis	30,000	LC	?	Population was estimated to be 10,000 individuals 2003. However, range is now known to be 3x larger than this estimate supposed, leading to current estimate of at least 30,000 individuals.	
Udzungwa red colobus	Procolobus gordonorum	30,000–40,000	VU	▼	Values given are for total population.	
Bornean orangutan	Pongo pygmaeus	47,000–104,700	CR	▼	Values given are for total population; lower arm is projected 2025 population.	
Müller's gibbon (Bornean gibbon)	Hylobates muelleri	80,000-100,000	EN	▼	Values given are for total population.	
Heck's macaque	Macaca hecki	100,000	VU	▼	Estimate is for mature individuals only.	
Japanese macaque	Macaca fuscata	114,431	LC	Steady	IUCN Assessment does not provide a population estimate.	
Tonkean macaque	Macaca tonkeana	150,000	VU	▼	Value given is for total population.	
Booted macaque	Macaca ochreata	180,000	VU	▼	Value given is an estimate for total population from 2001.	
Western gorilla	Gorilla gorilla	316,000	CR	▼	Value given is the projected total population of G. g. gorilla circa 2018. Subspecies G. g. diehli is expected to have only a few hundred individuals.	
Chimpanzee	Pan troglodytes	345,000–470,000	EN	▼	Values given are an estimate of total population, determined by adding populations of four subspecies: P. t. ellioti (6,000-9,000 individuals); P. t. schweinfurthii (181,000-256,000 individuals); P. t. troglodytes (140,000 individuals); P. t. verus (18,000-65,000 individuals)	
Crab-eating macaque (Long-tailed macaque)	Macaca fascicularis	904,638	EN	▼	Value given is an estimate of total population, determined by country-specific analyses of threats and rate of decline. See supplementary material on IUCN Assessment for further details.	
Senegal bushbaby (Northern lesser galago)	Galago senegalensis	107,000,000	LC	▼	Rough estimate based on population density and range.	
Human	Homo sapiens	8,163,000,000		▲	2024 estimate	

== Species without population estimates ==
Common name	Binomial name	Population	Status	Trend	Notes	Image
Gelada	Theropithecus gelada	unknown	LC	▼	Total population was estimated between 440,000 and 884,000 individuals in 1977. Current IUCN Assessment does not provide a population estimate, but the largest known population has decreased by 57% since the 1970s.	

== See also ==
- Lists of organisms by population
- Lists of mammals by population
- Human population
- The World's 25 Most Endangered Primates
