= Lutung =

Lutung may refer to:

- Trachypithecus genus
  - Specific monkey species within the genus:
    - East Javan langur
    - Germain's langur
    - Silvery lutung
    - Tenasserim lutung
