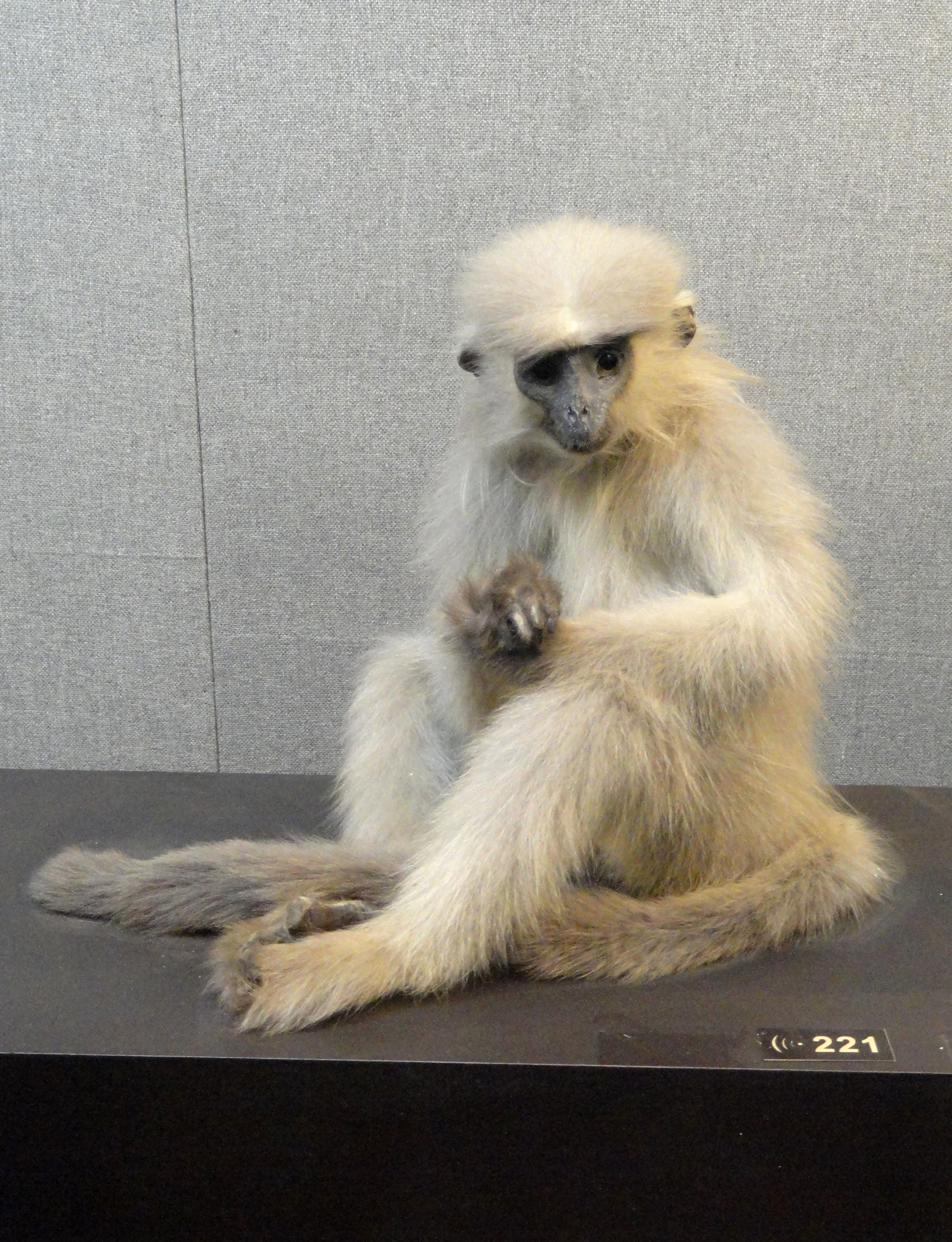

Conservation status
- Endangered (IUCN 3.1)
- CITES Appendix I (CITES)

Scientific classification
- Domain: Eukaryota
- Kingdom: Animalia
- Phylum: Chordata
- Class: Mammalia
- Order: Primates
- Suborder: Haplorhini
- Infraorder: Simiiformes
- Family: Cercopithecidae
- Genus: Trachypithecus
- Species: T. shortridgei

Binomial name
- Trachypithecus shortridgei Wroughton, 1915
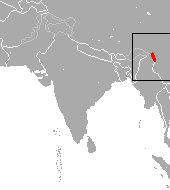
- Shortridge's langur range

= Shortridge's langur =

Species of Old World monkey

The Shortridge's langur (Trachypithecus shortridgei) is an Old World monkey native to Burma and China.
