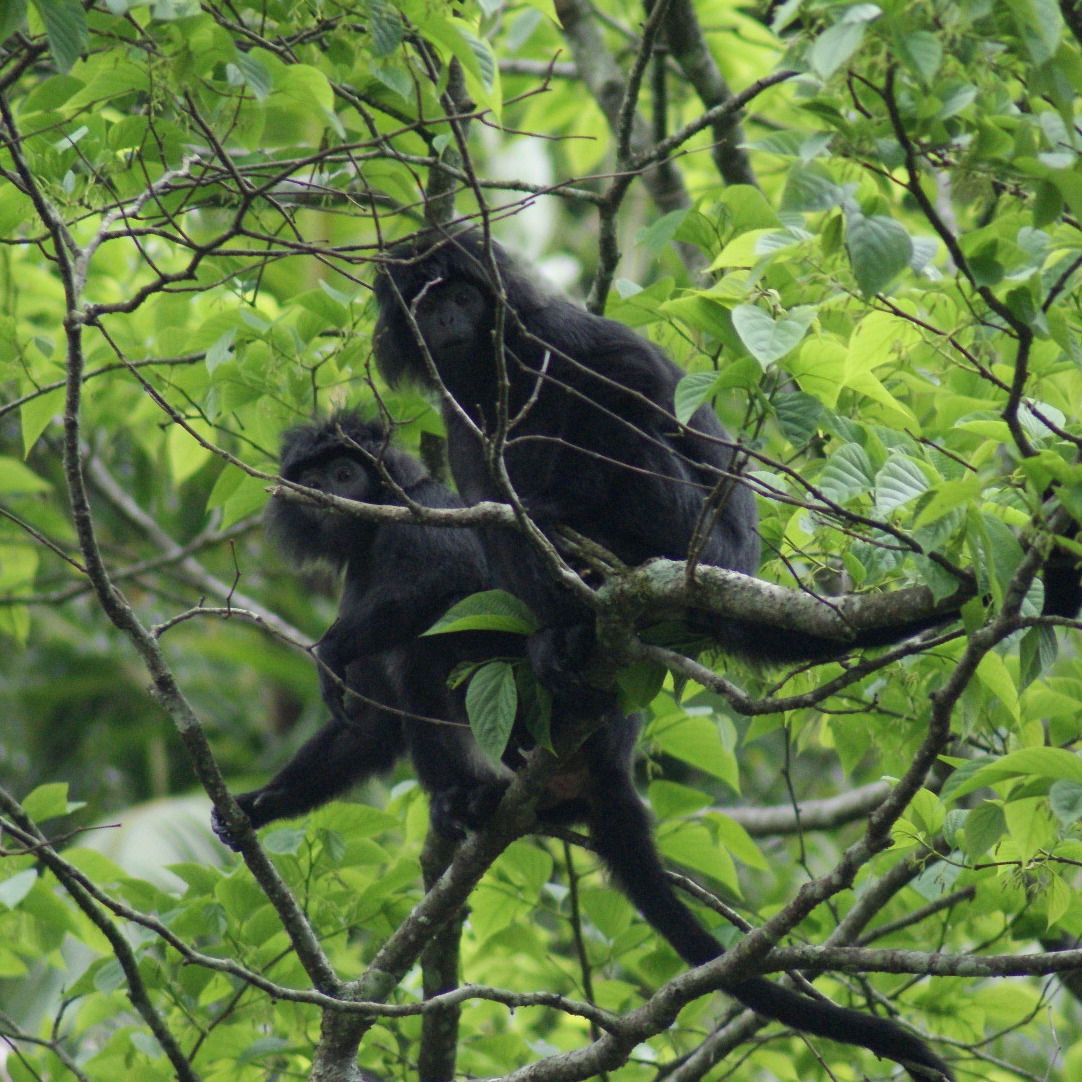

Conservation status
- Vulnerable (IUCN 3.1)

Scientific classification
- Kingdom: Animalia
- Phylum: Chordata
- Class: Mammalia
- Order: Primates
- Suborder: Haplorhini
- Infraorder: Simiiformes
- Family: Cercopithecidae
- Genus: Trachypithecus
- Species group: Trachypithecus cristatus group
- Species: T. mauritius

Binomial name
- Trachypithecus mauritius (Griffith, 1821)

= West Javan langur =

Species of Old World monkey

The West Javan langur (Trachypithecus mauritius) is an Old World monkey from the Colobinae subfamily. It was formerly considered a subspecies of Trachypithecus auratus until it was elevated to a separate species by Roos and Groves in 2008. It is listed as vulnerable by the IUCN. Its range is restricted to the island of Java west of Jakarta. Its range is currently restricted to Ujung Kulon National Park, Muara Angke Wildlife Reserve and Muaragembong due to industrial development, habitat fragmentation and the disconnection of protected areas. They are known to eat the leaves and fruits of Sonneratia in mangroves.
