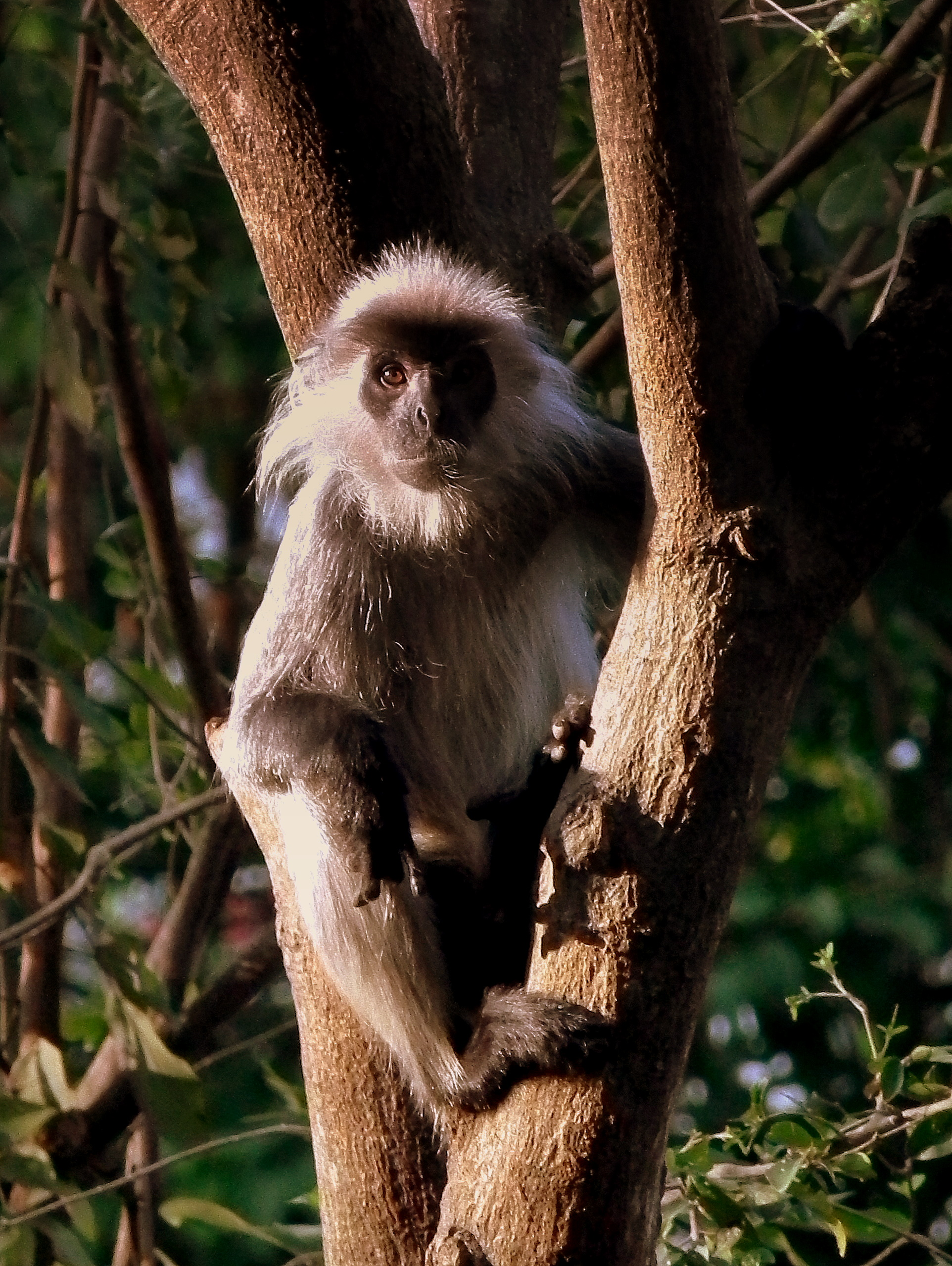
- Zoo specimen

Conservation status
- Endangered (IUCN 3.1)

Scientific classification
- Kingdom: Animalia
- Phylum: Chordata
- Class: Mammalia
- Order: Primates
- Suborder: Haplorhini
- Infraorder: Simiiformes
- Family: Cercopithecidae
- Genus: Trachypithecus
- Species group: Trachypithecus cristatus group
- Species: T. margarita

Binomial name
- Trachypithecus margarita (Elliot, 1909)
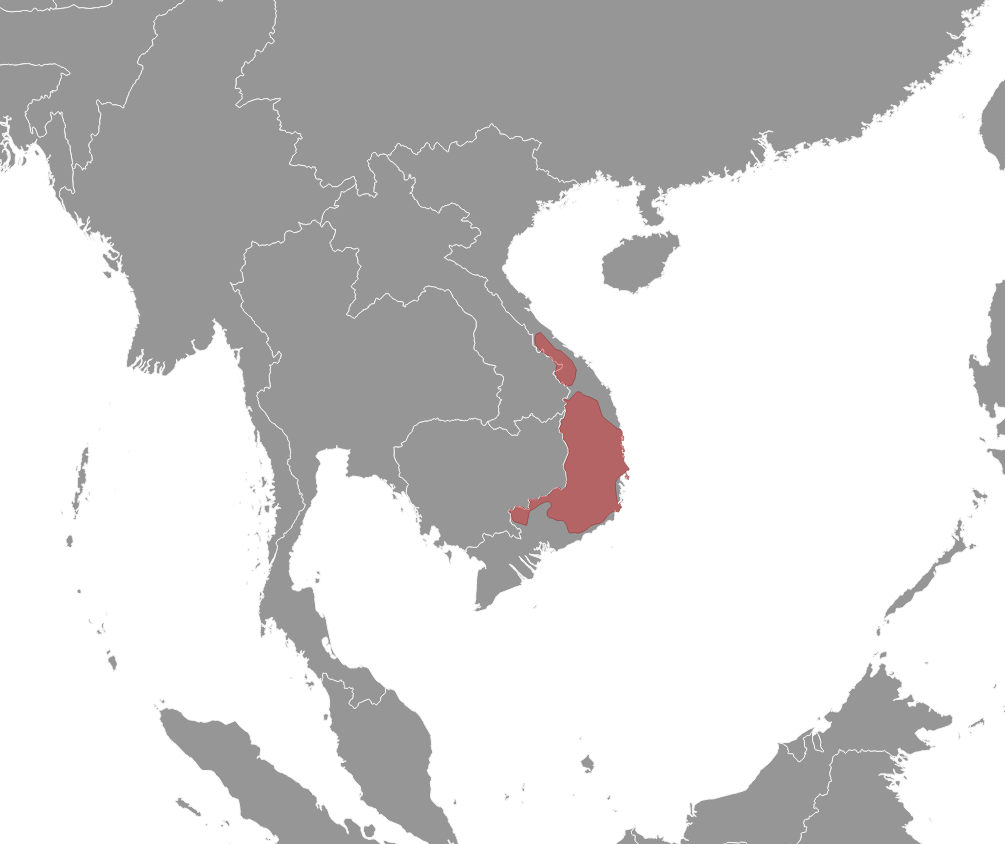

= Annamese langur =

Species of Old World monkey

The Annamese langur (Trachypithecus margarita) is an Old World monkey from the Colobinae subfamily. It was formerly considered a subspecies of Trachypithecus germaini until it was elevated to a separate species by Roos and Groves in 2008. Its fur is lighter in colour than that of Trachypithecus germaini. Its range includes parts of Cambodia, Laos and Vietnam.
