= Popa langur =

Conservation status
- Critically Endangered (IUCN 3.1)

Scientific classification
- Kingdom: Animalia
- Phylum: Chordata
- Class: Mammalia
- Infraclass: Placentalia
- Order: Primates
- Family: Cercopithecidae
- Genus: Trachypithecus
- Species: T. popa

Binomial name
- Trachypithecus popa Roos et al., 2020
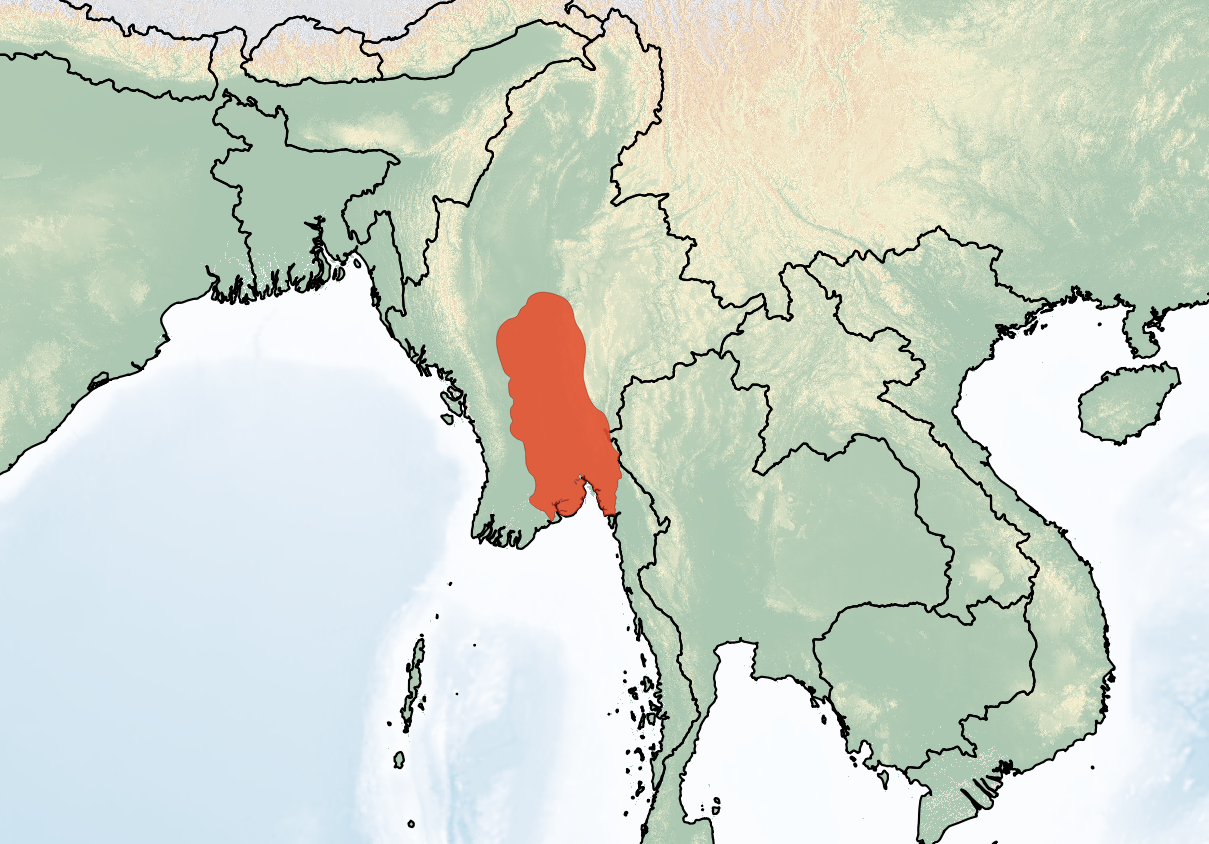

Species of mammal

The Popa langur (Trachypithecus popa) is a species of primate in the family Cercopithecidae. It occurs only in Myanmar and was named after Mount Popa, where a population of 100 of the monkeys live. It is listed as Critically Endangered on the IUCN Red List, as the wild population is thought to comprise 200 to 250 mature individuals.

== Taxonomy ==
The Popa langur was discovered in 2020 in a lab setting instead of the field. A phylogenetic study was conducted in an effort to understand the Popa langur's taxonomic relationships with other species of the genus. For this study, scientists used fecal samples from wild langurs and tissue samples from museum specimens.

Alongside the genetic analysis the discovery also involved the comparison of the Popa langur with a specimen of the Phayre's langur at the Natural History Museum, London. The examination revealed small differences in their skins, skulls and coloration.

== Characteristics ==
The Popa langur has a dark-brown or grey-brown back, a white belly, and black hands and feet. It has distinctive white rings around the eyes, as well as the muzzle. It weighs around 8 kg (18 lb).

== Distribution and habitat ==
The Popa langur occurs in central Myanmar, mainly around Mount Popa.

== Conservation ==
The Popa langur is threatened by hunting, habitat destruction and fragmentation.

== See also ==
- List of primates described in the 2020s
- List of living mammal species described in the 2020s
