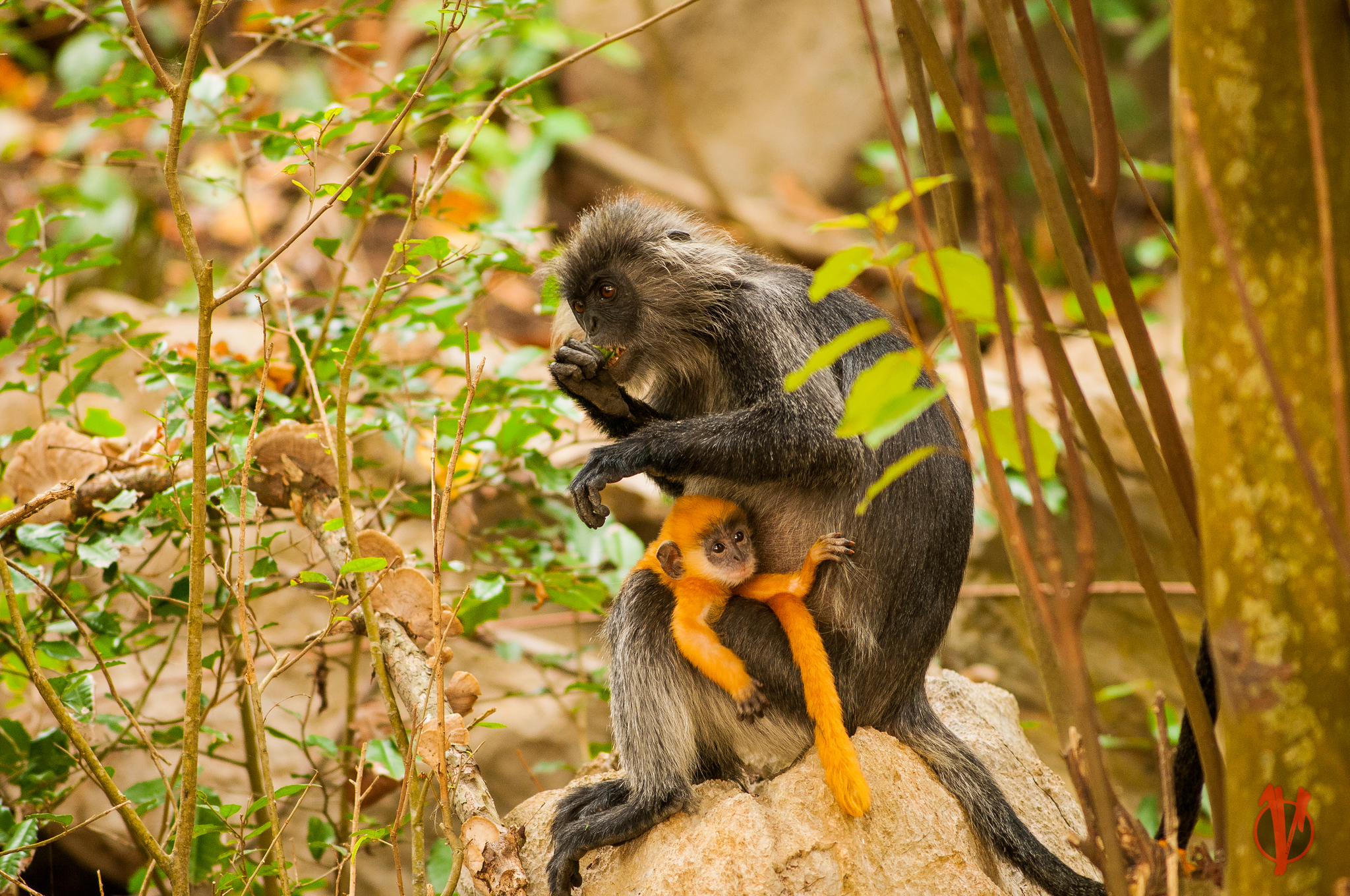

Conservation status
- Endangered (IUCN 3.1)

Scientific classification
- Kingdom: Animalia
- Phylum: Chordata
- Class: Mammalia
- Infraclass: Placentalia
- Order: Primates
- Family: Cercopithecidae
- Genus: Trachypithecus
- Species group: Trachypithecus cristatus group
- Species: T. germaini

Binomial name
- Trachypithecus germaini (A. Milne-Edwards, 1876)
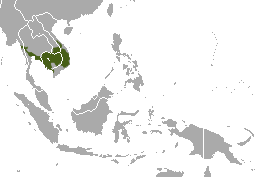
- Joint range of Germain's langur and Annamese langur

= Germain's langur =

Species of Old World monkey

Germain's langur (Trachypithecus germaini) is an Old World monkey native to Thailand, Myanmar, Cambodia, Laos and Vietnam. The monkey was previously included in Trachypithecus cristatus and Trachypithecus villosus.

Two subspecies were recognized:

- Trachypithecus germaini germaini
- Trachypithecus germaini caudalis

== Taxonomy and evolution ==
Germain's langur is part of the leaf monkey subfamily Colobinae. Two subspecies of the Germain's langur are recognized: Trachypithecus germaini germaini and Trachypithecus germaini caudalis. However, the classification of the Germain's langur has been contested, with T. germaini being grouped with other species in its subfamily. T. germaini and T. margarita were considered to be a single species, T. villosus, but morphological and genetic evidence has shown that they are distinct. T. germaini has also been grouped with T. cristatus until recent reclassifications.

Trachypithecus germaini goes by several common names such as the Indochinese lutung, Germain's langur, Germain's silver langur, Indochinese leaf monkey, and Indochinese silvered langur.

== Description ==
Germain's langur has black colouration on its hands and feet, as well as the upper part of its body which fades into paler grey on its underparts. They have long grey tails and white hairs on its round face. Their young have bright orange fur.

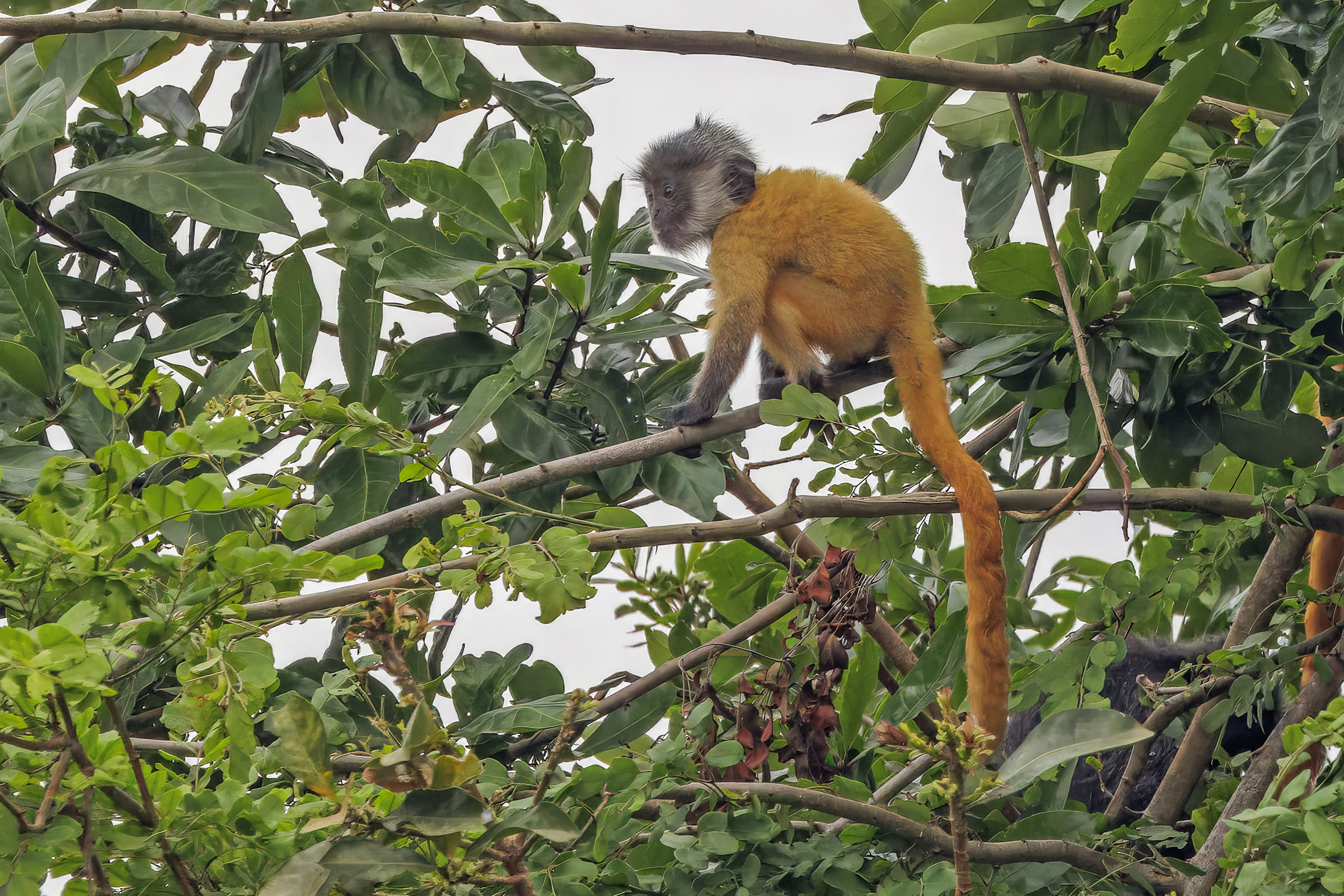
juvenile

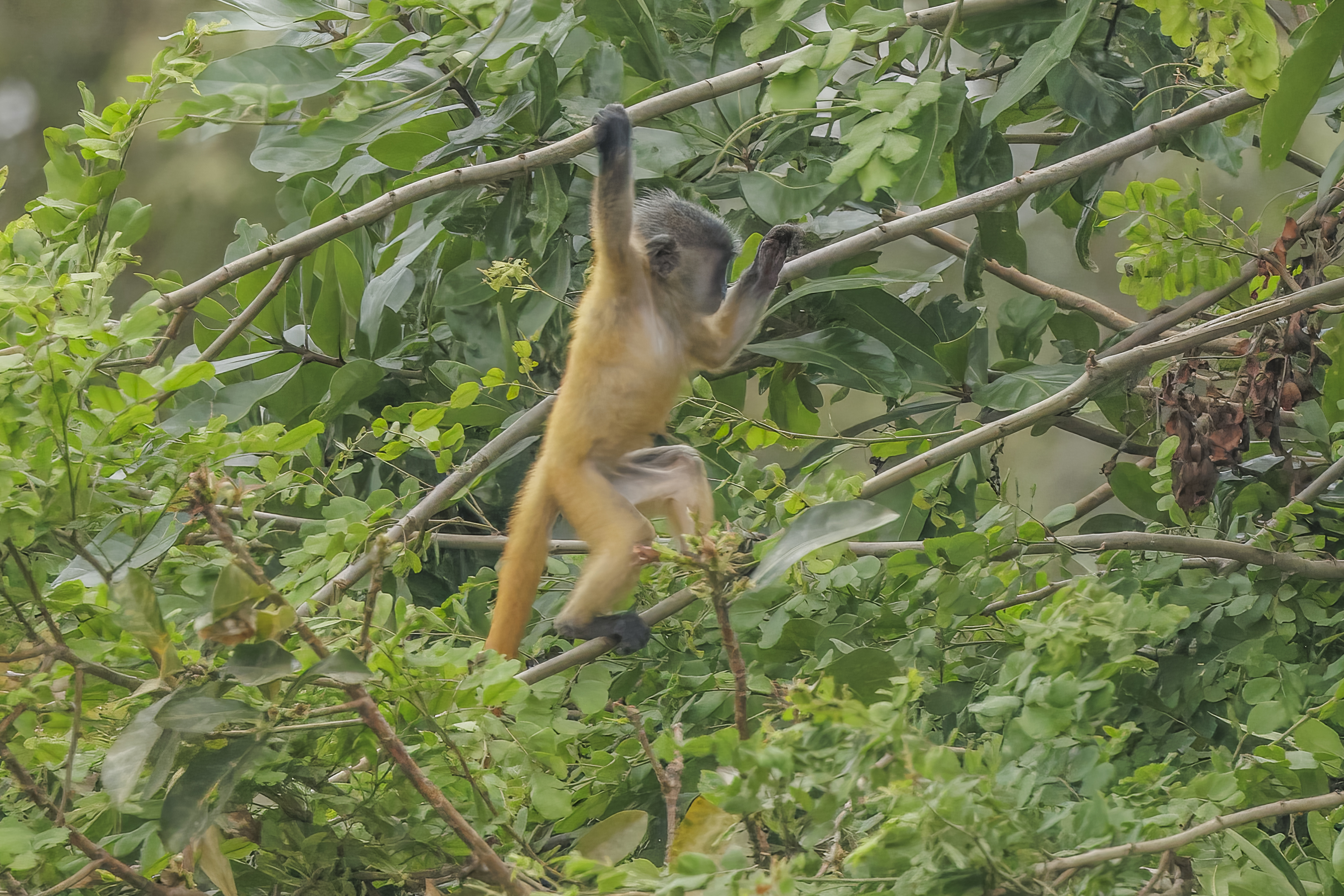
juvenile

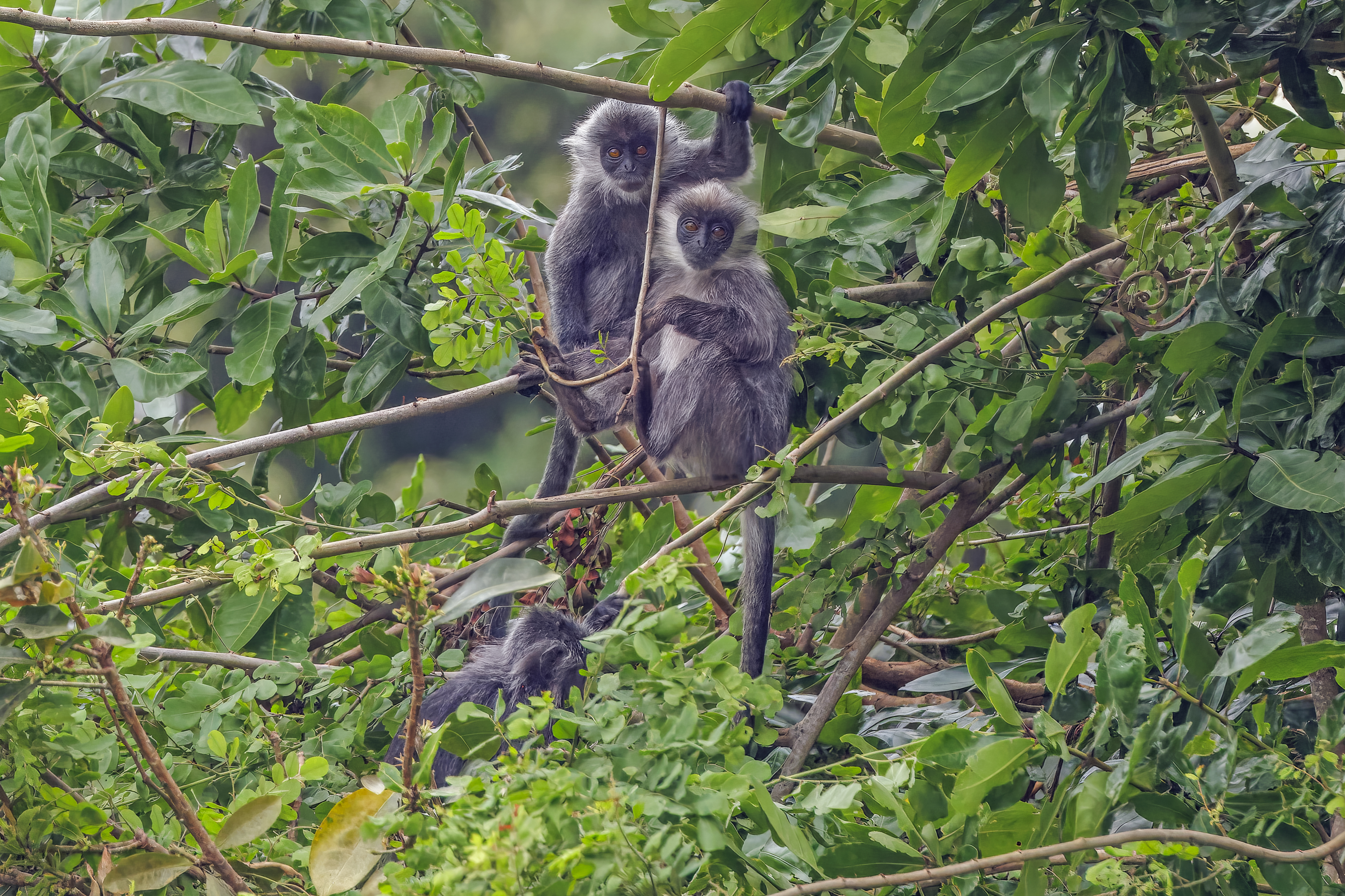
adults

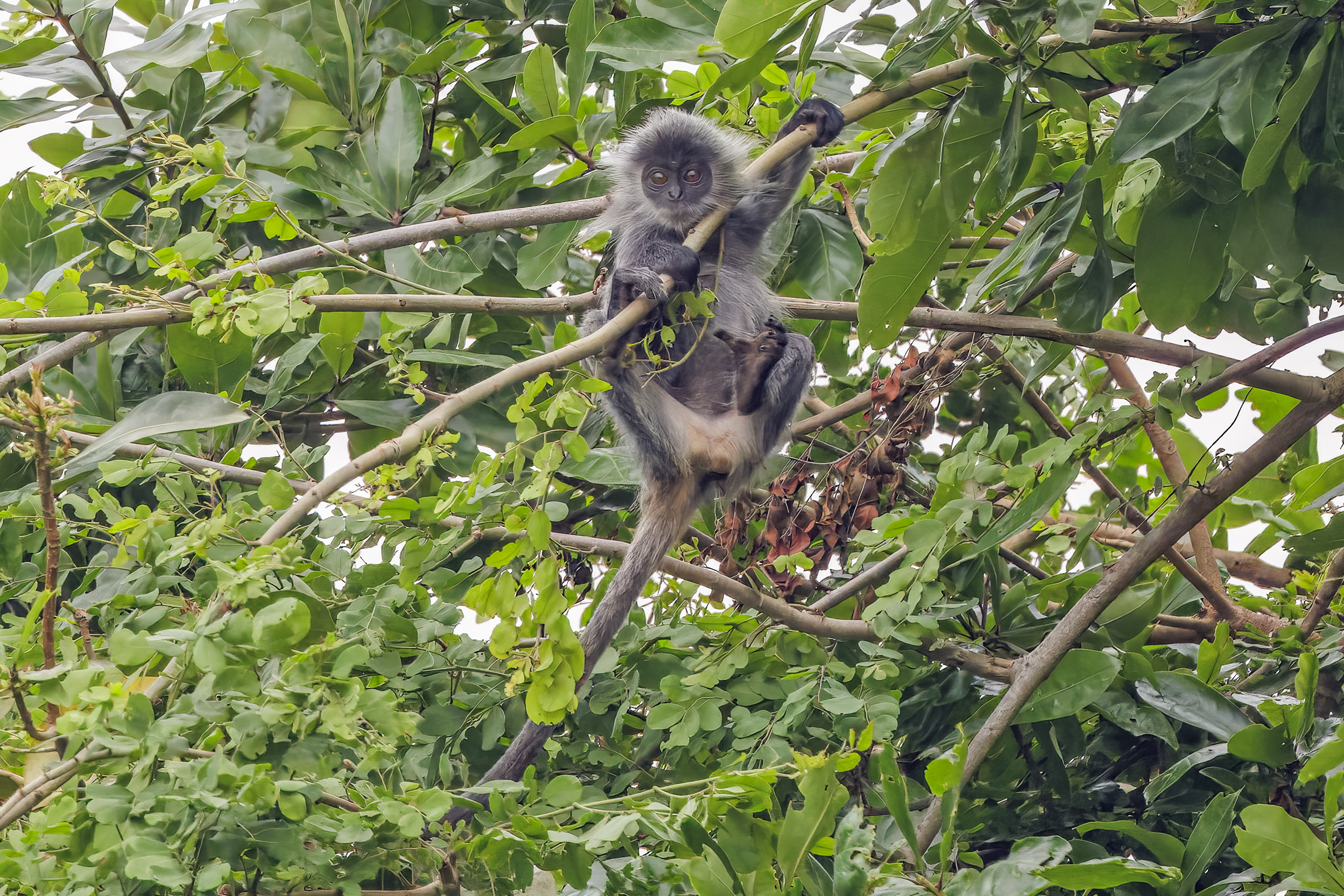
adult female

== Distribution and habitat ==
The limits of the distribution of Germain's langur are not well known, but they are currently found in Asia, specifically Cambodia, Vietnam, Lao PDR, Myanmar, and Thailand. Populations in Vietnam are severely reduced, with few sightings in the last 50 years. In Lao PDR, the species has no continuous range, rather multiple patches of higher relative abundance. Its distribution in Cambodia is widespread, but its abundance will vary from common to rare. One of the few sites with a population estimate is Keo Seima Wildlife Sanctuary where a stable population of 1487 is reported. In Thailand, the species is common, with many protected areas supporting large populations. Germain's langur is a terrestrial arboreal species, often found in lowlands. They prefer evergreen and semi-evergreen, riverine, mixed deciduous, and gallery forests. They are not commonly found at high elevations or hilly areas.

== Behaviour ==
The diet of Germain's langur is folivorous consisting of leaves, shoots, and fruits. They are also observed to consume mushrooms (mycophagy) and soil (geophagy). Their folivorous diet dictates a resting period, in which they can undergo the process of rumination.

Trachypithecus germaini, and other Asian colobines, are generally less frequently engaged in social interaction than frugivorous primates such as macaques. They have a lower affinity to social behaviour in comparison to feeding and resting which makes up the majority of their day. However, T. germaini is often found in troops of 10 to 50 individuals in close social proximity.

== Predators and threats ==
Predators of Trachypithecus, including the Germain's langur, include leopards, tigers, dholes, and large snakes. A variety of small carnivores will feed on the young.

Prevalent threats to Germain's langur include hunting, exotic pet trading, and habitat loss due to agricultural expansion.

== Status and conservation ==
T. germaini is considered endangered by the IUCN, with a greater than 50% decline in the past three generations. It is listed under CITES Appendix II, meaning that trade of the species must be controlled to avoid endangerment.

Little conservation efforts have been made, despite the species designation. Several protected areas have been established across its range which aids in the conservation of the species. The species has been recorded in numerous protected areas in Vietnam and Thailand. In Vietnam, their populations have increased in two protected areas, Phú Quốc National Park and Kiên Lương Karst Area, demonstrating the importance of conservation efforts.
