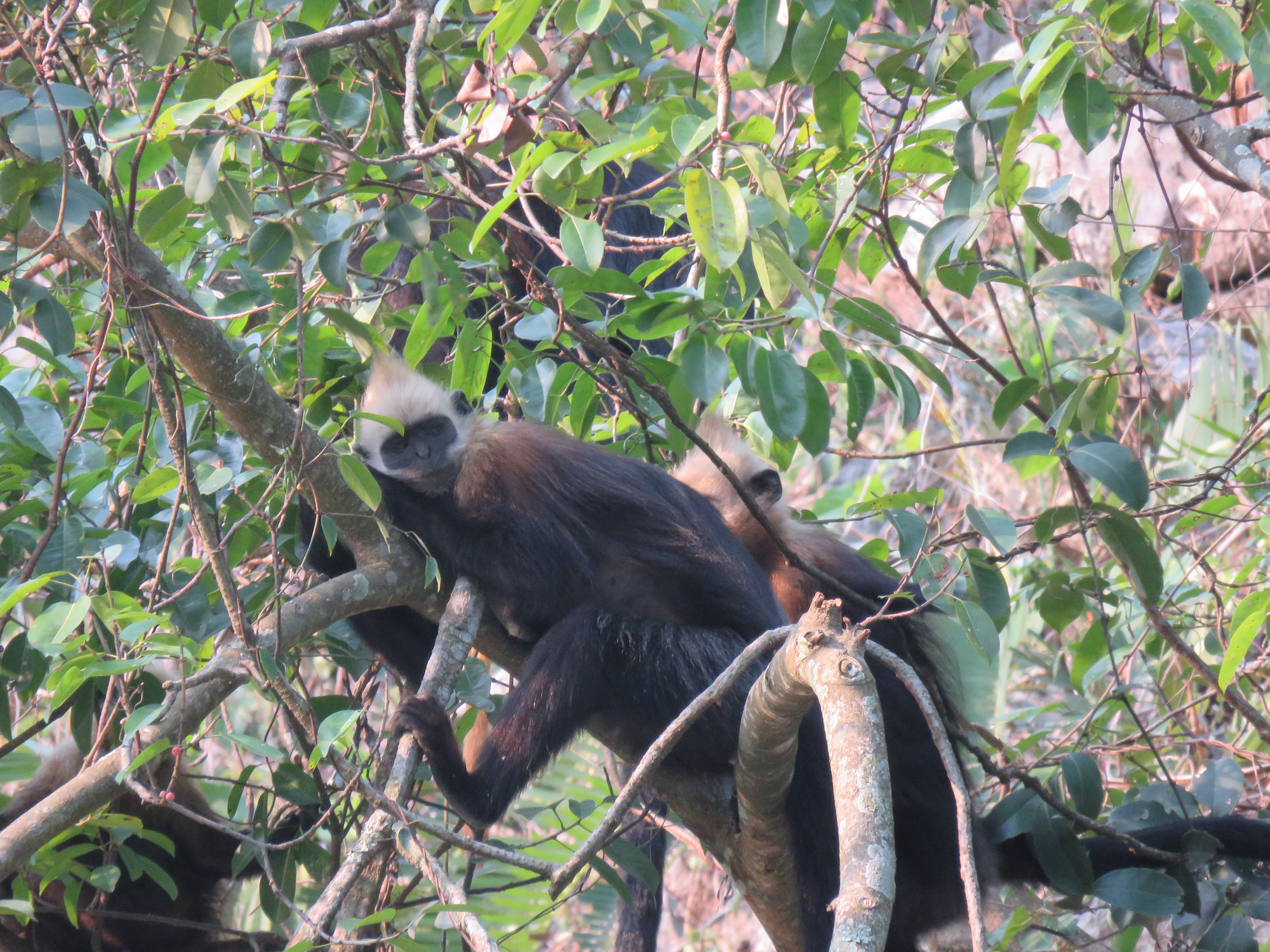
- Cat Ba langurs at Cát Bà National Park, Vietnam

Conservation status
- Critically Endangered (IUCN 3.1)

Scientific classification
- Kingdom: Animalia
- Phylum: Chordata
- Class: Mammalia
- Infraclass: Placentalia
- Order: Primates
- Family: Cercopithecidae
- Genus: Trachypithecus
- Species group: Trachypithecus francoisi group
- Species: T. poliocephalus

Binomial name
- Trachypithecus poliocephalus (Trouessart, 1911)
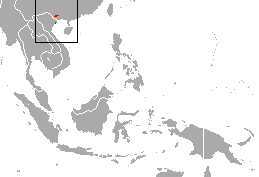
- Cat Ba langur range (includes range of white-headed langur)

= Cat Ba langur =

Species of monkey

The Cat Ba langur (Trachypithecus poliocephalus), also known as the golden-headed langur, is a critically endangered species of langur endemic to Cát Bà Island, Vietnam. It is among the rarest primates in the world, and possibly the rarest primate in Asia, with population size estimated at less than 70 individuals.

== Taxonomy ==
The Cat Ba langur was considered a subspecies of François' langur (T. francoisi) until 1995. The white-headed langur (T. leucocephalus) of China was formerly considered a subspecies of T. poliocephalus until 2007.

== Description ==
Both T. poliocephalus and T. leucocephalus are overall blackish, but the crown, cheeks and neck are yellowish in T. poliocephalus, while they are white in T. leucocephalus, as suggested by its scientific name. According to the Cat Ba Langur Conservation Project, the Cat Ba langur's skin is black and the pelage color is dark brown; head and shoulder are bright golden to yellowish-white. The tail is very long (ca. 85 cm (33 in)) compared with the body size (ca. 50 cm (20 in)). Babies are colored golden-orange; the pelage starts to change its color from about the fourth month on. Males and females look alike. Two adult females captured during translocation in 2012 weighted slightly more than 9 kilograms (20 lb) each.

The Cat Ba langur, which lives on Cat Ba Island in Vietnam, is one of the 25 most endangered primates. Conservation efforts are helping to prevent this, however, and have greatly increased their population since 2003, when there were only 40. Until recently, the Cat Ba langur was not considered a species but rather a subspecies of one of two other Trachypithecus species. Cat Ba langurs are diurnal creatures and travel in groups of about four to eighteen animals. They prefer the steep limestone cliffs that make up most of Cat Ba Island. Most of the places that they are found are not accessible to humans by foot. Cat Ba langurs spend around 66% of their time resting and the rest moving, foraging, and socializing, with the distribution changing between summer and winter. They eat less and rest more in the winter and the opposite in the summer.

Due to the limited amount of resources available on Cat Ba Island, Cat Ba langurs have developed a number of unique behaviors and adaptations, one of which is the ability to safely consume saltwater. In late 2024, the German Primate Center - Leibniz Institute for Primate Research in Göttingen and Leipzig Zoo published a study addressing potential genetic adaptations that provide a higher tolerance for salinity.

== Habitat ==
Cat Ba island is the largest island within the Cat Ba archipelago, with 366 smaller islands and tidally exposed rocks surrounding it. As all members of the Trachypithecus francoisi species group, this social, diurnal monkey is found in limestone forests. Critically endangered, this langur resides near Ha Long Bay, specifically in Cat Ba Island, hence its common name "Cat Ba Langur". This landscape is known as a karst formation that has been invaded by the ocean. The topography is of limestone that has been worn away through erosion, which later formed ridges, towers, fissures, sinkholes and other types of landforms. The Cat Ba Langur are diurnal animals, adapted to living in limestone habitat. The sleeping caves, ledges, and overhangs used by the langurs are thought to be used as protection from predators and extreme weather. Accessible caves were used as a hunting ground for humans to capture or kill langurs as they slept.

The Cat Ba langur lives in a moist tropical rain forest on limestone hills, a type of habitat used by 6–7 other genera of the T. francoisi group found elsewhere in Vietnam. During the summer the weather is warm, and rainy with temperatures averaging 25 °C (77 °F). In the winter, it is usually cold with little rain and high temperatures averaging less than 20 °C (68 °F). Because there are no rivers and streams and no permanent freshwater ponds on the Cat Ba Island, the langurs take their moisture from rainwater caught in rock pockets and contained in vegetation. Temporary surface streams form briefly during rainy season, rapidly receding into caves and subterranean passages. The soil is derived from the erosion of the native limestone bedrock, and organic detritus from the vegetation. The Cat Ba langurs live in groups, usually one male with several females and their offspring. Each group has its own territory, defended by the adult male who also initiates the location of the group. The females usually give birth to a single baby every 2–3 years, which becomes mature at 4–6 years old. Langurs have an average life expectancy of 25 years. The environment provides an arborous and terrestrial habitat for langurs as well as meeting the needs of their folivorous diet. Food mainly consists of leaves, but also fresh shoots, flowers, bark, and some fruits. The leaves make up over 70% of the langur's diet.

Despite its very small distribution and population, research indicates that this species persisted on Cat Ba Island since at least the latest Pleistocene, about 12,000 years ago, and never reached a population over 4,000 - 5,000 individuals even at its peak.

== Conservation ==
The Cat Ba langur is listed as one of The World's 25 Most Endangered Primates and is assumed to have declined by 80% over the last three generations. It is estimated that there are less than 70 of these langurs left in the world.

In November 2000, Münster Zoo and ZSCSP, the Zoological Society for the Conservation of Species and Populations, started the Cat Ba Langur Conservation Project. The Cat Ba langur's distribution range was declared a National Park in 1986, however that did not stop the poaching and decline of the population. About 30% of the population is located outside of the National Park until 2006. In 2006 Cat Ba National Park was expanded to include the entire Cat Ba langur population and Special Protection Zones were established to provide the most stringent protection available under Vietnamese law.

There is a strictly protected sanctuary, a peninsula on the eastern coast of Cat Ba Island, in the National Park and supports about 40% of the population. Fixed boundaries were set with blocking buoys and prohibition signs. Another step taken was to increase the number of rangers in the area. Local citizens, especially fishermen, were informed and rangers were given permission to remove people and take away any poaching equipment they found. Any existing and potential caves and hunter trails are registered, regulated, and controlled.

At the end of 2001, there was no more hunting of the Cat Ba Langur. Since the beginning of the conservation efforts, nine langurs have been born and only three have died of natural causes.

The greatest populations of the Cat Ba Langur are expected to recover with the appropriate conservation of the limestone habitats. There are currently 3 Cat Ba Langurs held at the Endangered Primate Center in Cuc Phuong National Park, Vietnam.

== Threats to survival ==
Hunting of the Cat Ba langur used to be common. The primary reason for hunting was to supply the traditional medicine industry. Cat Ba langurs were used to make a "monkey balm" believed to help with erectile dysfunction and other health issues. Since the langurs are so few, hunting takes two to four weeks. A hunter can earn up to $50 from a single langur, which is a lot when the average annual per capita income is less than $350. Since it is so hard to find the langurs, the poachers do not go out with the intent on capturing one, but often capture them by chance when hunting other animals in the area. Between 1970 and 1986, an estimated 500 to 800 langurs were killed.

The hunters of the langurs have been known to attack people who get in their way. As part of a conservation effort, "body guards" for the langurs have been put into place. These guards are unarmed, and on several occasions have been severely hurt by the hunters. Teeth have been knocked out and several have been stabbed. Because of the fear of being attacked, the guards do not want to do their job anymore.

Cat Ba Island is in the process of creating a booming tourist industry. They are in the process of building luxury hotels around the island, with one hotel being 17 stories tall. To accommodate all the new tourists, the town of Cat Ba is building a new road that will connect the town to a small village on the northern edge of the island where a ferry will be to take tourists to another popular destination: Ha Long Bay. The road runs just along a border of the park which may attract more hunters to the area.
