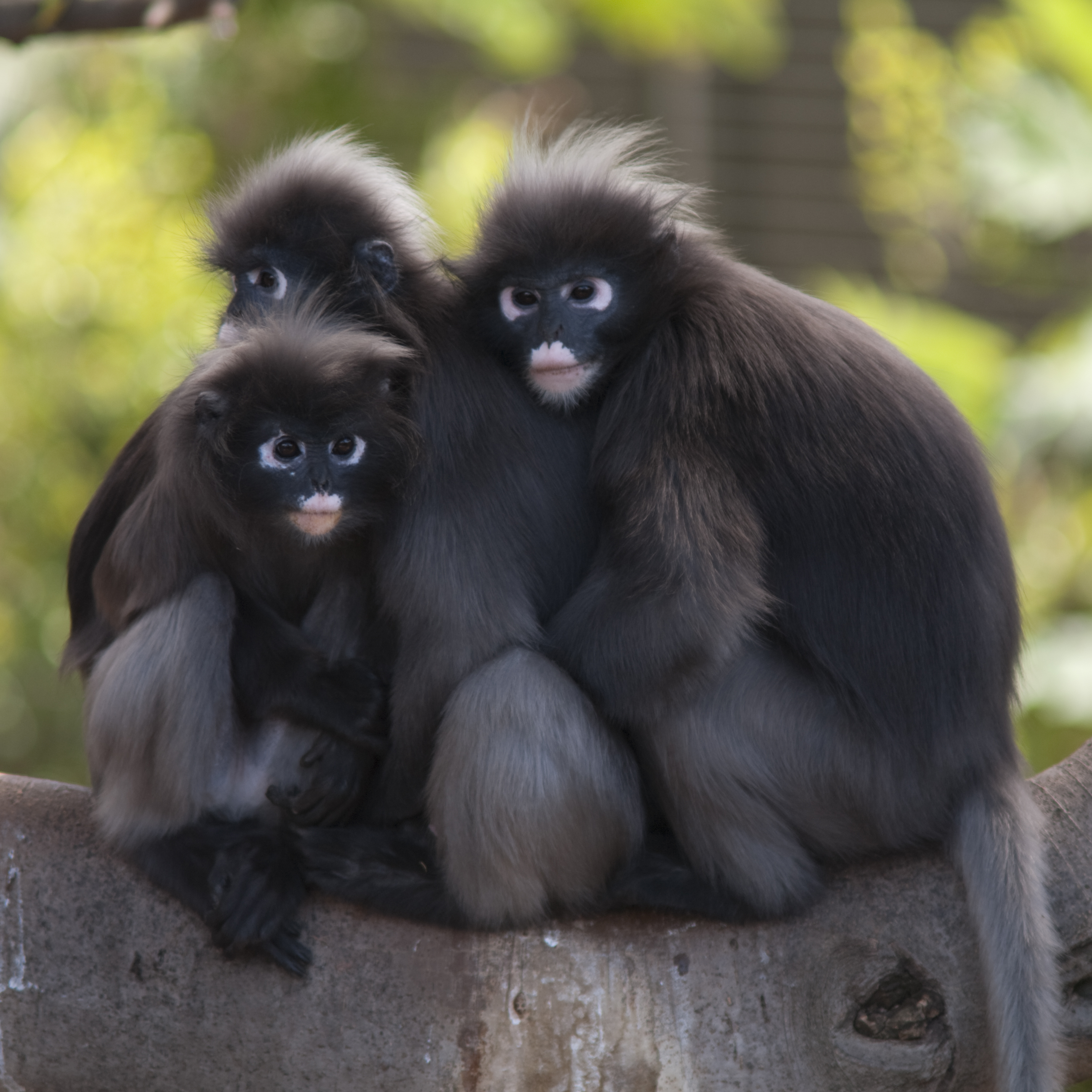
- Dusky leaf monkey (Trachypithecus obscurus)

Scientific classification
- Kingdom: Animalia
- Phylum: Chordata
- Class: Mammalia
- Infraclass: Placentalia
- Order: Primates
- Family: Cercopithecidae
- Subfamily: Colobinae
- Tribe: Presbytini
- Genus: Trachypithecus; Reichenbach, 1862

Type species
- Semnopithecus pyrrhus Horsfield, 1823 (= Cercopithecus auratus É. Geoffroy, 1812)

Species
- 16, see text

= Trachypithecus =

Genus of Old World monkeys

Trachypithecus is a genus of Old World monkeys containing species known as lutungs, langurs, or leaf monkeys. Their range is much of Southeast Asia (northeast India, Vietnam, southern China, Borneo, Thailand, Java, and Bali).

The name "lutung" comes from the Sundanese language meaning "blackness", ultimately from Proto-Austronesian *luCuŋ (which originally referred to the Formosan rock macaque); it is preferred in one paper because the authors wanted the name langurs to only refer to monkeys in the genus Semnopithecus, although some "lutungs" are now "langurs" again. The scientific name of the genus comes from the Ancient Greek τραχύς (trakhús), meaning "rough", and πίθηκος (píthēkos), meaning "monkey".

== Evolution ==
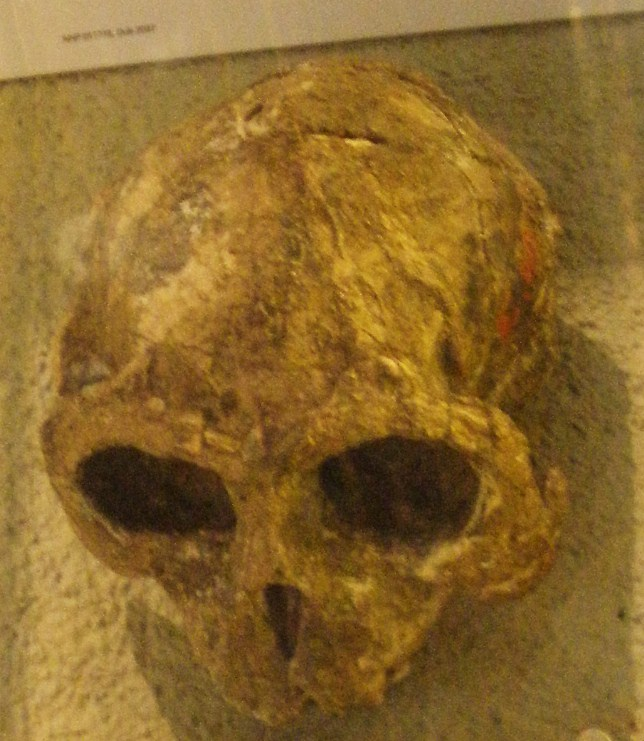
Trachypithecus cristatus robustus skull

Genetic analysis indicates that the ancestors of the modern species of lutung first differentiated from one another a little over 3 million years ago, during the late Pliocene. The various species alive today then diverged during the Pleistocene, presumably driven by habitat changes during the Ice Ages. The oldest fossils clearly identified as belonging to the genus date from the middle Pleistocene of Vietnam and Laos; later fossils are also known from Thailand, Java, and Sumatra. The closest living relatives of the lutungs are probably either the gray langurs or the surilis, although the exact relationships remain unclear, possibly due to hybridisation between these genera during the course of their recent evolutionary history.

== Taxonomy ==
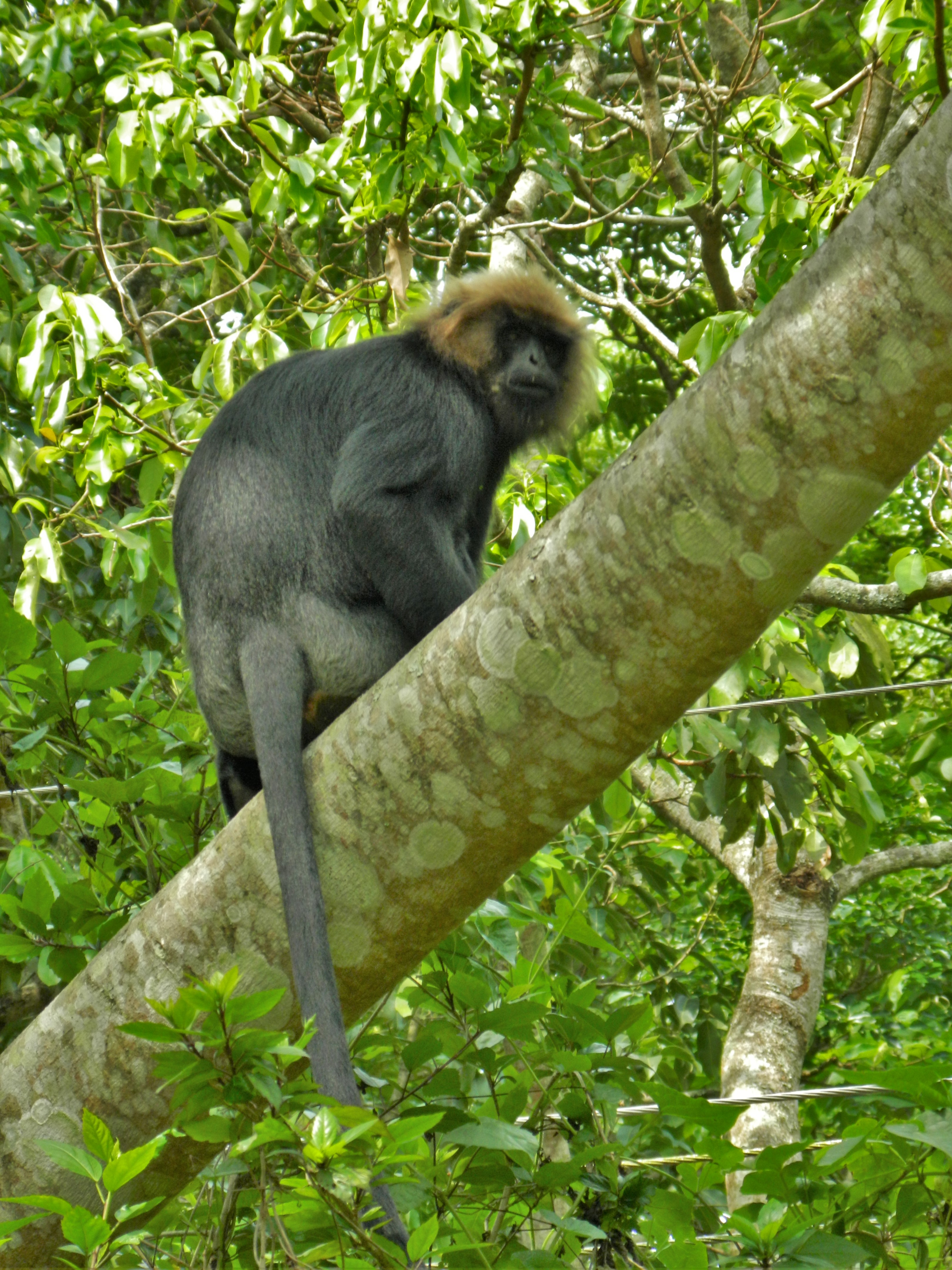
Nilgiri langur, formerly classified within the genus Trachypithecus but since moved to the genus Semnopithecus

As of 2005, the authors of Mammal Species of the World recognized the following Trachypithecus species:

- Genus Semnopithecus
  - formerly T. vetulus group - moved into genus Semnopithecus in most recent classifications
    - Purple-faced langur, Semnopithecus vetulus
    - Nilgiri langur, Semnopithecus johnii
- Genus Trachypithecus
  - T. cristatus group
    - Javan lutung, Trachypithecus auratus
    - Silvery lutung, silvery langur or silvered leaf monkey, Trachypithecus cristatus, but also used for T. germaini
    - Indochinese lutung or Germain's langur, Trachypithecus germaini
    - Tenasserim lutung, Trachypithecus barbei
  - T. obscurus group
    - Dusky leaf monkey, Trachypithecus obscurus
    - Phayre's leaf monkey, Trachypithecus phayrei
  - T. pileatus group
    - Capped langur, Trachypithecus pileatus
    - Shortridge's langur, Trachypithecus shortridgei
    - Gee's golden langur, Trachypithecus geei
  - T. francoisi group
    - Francois' langur, Trachypithecus francoisi
    - Hatinh langur, Trachypithecus hatinhensis
    - White-headed langur, Trachypithecus poliocephalus
    - Laotian langur, Trachypithecus laotum
    - Delacour's langur, Trachypithecus delacouri
    - Indochinese black langur, Trachypithecus ebenus

Since then, the T. vetulus group (the purple-faced langur and the Nilgiri langur) have been moved the genus Semnopithecus based on DNA and other evidence.

In 2008, Roos et al. described the Malay Peninsula form of the silvery lutung as a separate subspecies and subsequently it has been elevated to a separate species within the T. cristatus group as the Selangor silvered langur, T. selangorensis. Roos et al. also elevated the West Javan Langur, Trachypithecus mauritius, and Annamese Langur, Trachypithecus margarita, to species status (formerly subspecies of T. auratus and T. germaini, respectively). In 2020, Roos et al. discovered a new species, Popa langur (T. popa), which is found only in Myanmar. Lastly, the White-headed langur (T. leucocephalus), previously thought to be a subspecies of the Francois langur (T. Francois) or Cat Ba langur (T. poliocephalus), is currently recognized as a distinct species by IUCN Red List assessors and the American Society of Mammalogists, based on a 2007 paper by Groves.

This leaves the current understanding of the genus Trachypithecus to be:

Genus Trachypithecus – Reichenbach, 1862 – twenty-one species
Common name	Scientific name and subspecies	Range	Size and ecology	IUCN status and estimated population
Annamese langur	T. margarita (Elliot, 1909)	Southeastern Asia	Size: 40–76 cm (16–30 in) long, plus 57–110 cm (22–43 in) tail Habitat: Forest Diet: Leaves, flowers, and fruit	EN Unknown
Capped langur	T. pileatus (Blyth, 1843) Three subspecies: T. p. brahma; T. p. pileatus; T. p. tenebricus	Southern Asia	Size: 40–76 cm (16–30 in) long, plus 57–110 cm (22–43 in) tail Habitat: Forest Diet: Leaves, seeds, and fruit, as well as flowers, buds, bark, and caterpillars	VU Unknown
Cat Ba langur	T. poliocephalus (Pousargues, 1898)	Cát Bà Island, Vietnam (in purple)	Size: 40–76 cm (16–30 in) long, plus 57–110 cm (22–43 in) tail Habitat: Forests and caves Diet: Leaves, flowers, and fruit	CR 30–35
Delacour's langur	T. delacouri (Osgood, 1911)	Northern Vietnam	Size: 40–76 cm (16–30 in) long, plus 57–110 cm (22–43 in) tail Habitat: Forest, rocky areas, and caves Diet: Leaves, flowers, and fruit	CR 240–250
Dusky leaf monkey	T. obscurus (Reid, 1837) Seven subspecies: T. o. carbo; T. o. flavicauda; T. o. halonifer; T. o. obscurus; T. o. sanctorum; T. o. seimundi; T. o. styx	Southeastern Asia	Size: 42–61 cm (17–24 in) long, plus 50–85 cm (20–33 in) tail Habitat: Forest Diet: Leaves, shoots, fruit, and seedlings	EN Unknown
East Javan langur	T. auratus (É. Geoffroy, 1812)	Java and nearby islands in Indonesia	Size: 44–65 cm (17–26 in) long, plus 61–87 cm (24–34 in) tail Habitat: Forest Diet: Leaves and flowers, as well as fruit and insect larvae	VU Unknown
François' langur	T. francoisi (Pousargues, 1898)	Southern Asia	Size: 40–76 cm (16–30 in) long, plus 57–110 cm (22–43 in) tail Habitat: Forest, rocky areas, and caves Diet: Leaves, fruit, and seeds, as well as insects	EN 2,000–2,100
Gee's golden langur	T. geei (Khajuria, 1956)	Southern Asia	Size: 50–75 cm (20–30 in) long, plus 70–100 cm (28–39 in) tail Habitat: Forest Diet: Fruit, leaves, flowers, seeds, and twigs	EN 6,000–6,500
Germain's langur	T. germaini (A. Milne-Edwards, 1876)	Southeastern Asia	Size: 40–76 cm (16–30 in) long, plus 57–110 cm (22–43 in) tail Habitat: Forest and rocky areas Diet: Leaves, fruit, and flowers	EN Unknown
Hatinh langur	T. hatinhensis (Dao, 1970)	Vietnam	Size: 40–76 cm (16–30 in) long, plus 57–110 cm (22–43 in) tail Habitat: Forest, rocky areas, and caves Diet: Leaves, as well as fruit, vines, and flowers	EN Unknown
Indochinese black langur	T. ebenus (Brandon-Jones, 1995)	Southeastern Asia	Size: 40–76 cm (16–30 in) long, plus 57–110 cm (22–43 in) tail Habitat: Forest, rocky areas, and caves Diet: Leaves, as well as fruit, vines, and flowers	EN Unknown
Indochinese grey langur	T. crepuscula (Elliot, 1909)	Southeast Asia (in red)	Size: 40–76 cm (16–30 in) long, plus 57–110 cm (22–43 in) tail Habitat: Forest, inland wetlands, and rocky areas Diet: Leaves, flowers, and fruit	EN 2,400–2,500
Laotian langur	T. laotum (Thomas, 1911)	Laos	Size: 40–76 cm (16–30 in) long, plus 57–110 cm (22–43 in) tail Habitat: Forest and rocky areas Diet: Leaves, flowers, and fruit	EN Unknown
Phayre's leaf monkey	T. phayrei (Blyth, 1847) Two subspecies: T. p. phayrei; T. p. shanicus	Southeast Asia (in green)	Size: 40–76 cm (16–30 in) long, plus 57–110 cm (22–43 in) tail Habitat: Forest Diet: Leaves, as well as bamboo shoots	EN Unknown
Popa langur	T. popa Roos et al., 2020	Myanmar	Size: 40–76 cm (16–30 in) long, plus 57–110 cm (22–43 in) tail Habitat: Forest Diet: Leaves, flowers, and fruit	CR 130–180
Shortridge's langur	T. shortridgei (Wroughton, 1915)	Southern Asia	Size: 40–76 cm (16–30 in) long, plus 57–110 cm (22–43 in) tail Habitat: Forest Diet: Leaves, flowers, and fruit	EN Unknown
Selangor silvered langur	T. selangorensis Roos, Nadler, Walter, 2008	Peninsular Malaysia	Size: 40–76 cm (16–30 in) long, plus 57–110 cm (22–43 in) tail Habitat: Forest Diet: Leaves, flowers, and fruit	NT Unknown
Silvery lutung	T. cristatus (Raffles, 1821) Two subspecies: T. c. cristatus; T. c. vigilans	Southeastern Asia	Size: 46–56 cm (18–22 in) long, plus 63–84 cm (25–33 in) tail Habitat: Forest Diet: Leaves, as well as fruit, seeds, shoots, flowers, and buds	VU Unknown
Tenasserim lutung	T. barbei (Blyth, 1847)	Southeastern Asia	Size: 40–76 cm (16–30 in) long, plus 57–110 cm (22–43 in) tail Habitat: Forest Diet: Leaves, flowers, and fruit	VU Unknown
West Javan langur	T. mauritius (Griffith, 1821)	Island of Java	Size: 40–76 cm (16–30 in) long, plus 57–110 cm (22–43 in) tail Habitat: Forest Diet: Leaves, flowers, and fruit	VU Unknown
White-headed langur	T. leucocephalus Tan, 1957	Southern China	Size: 40–76 cm (16–30 in) long, plus 57–110 cm (22–43 in) tail Habitat: Rocky areas Diet: Leaves, flowers, and fruit	CR 230–250

== Physical description ==
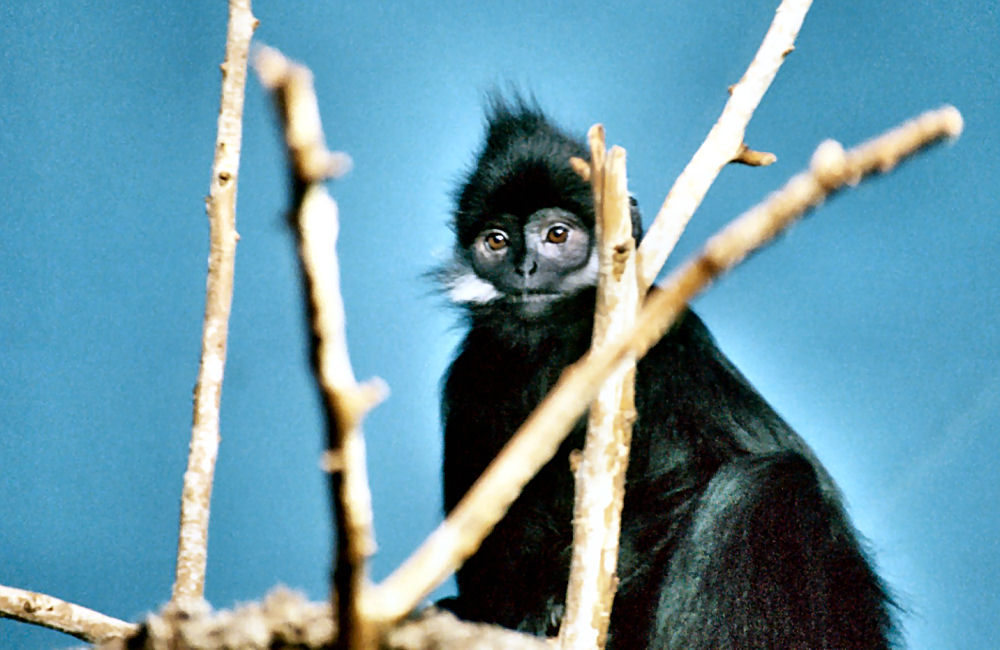
Francois' langur (Trachypithecus francoisi)

Lutungs have a rather slim build with a long tail. The fur color varies, depending on the species, from black and grey to orange yellow. Many species have skin designs and a brighter lower surface, the hair on the head is often compared to a hood. Their arms are very short in comparison to their hind legs, and their thumbs are also somewhat shorter than in other primates. The inner surfaces of the hands and feet are hairless so that their fur does not get caught when reaching into branches. These animals reach a length of 40 to 80 cm and a weight of 5 to 15 kg, with males being generally larger than females. A ridge over the eyes and other details, primarily related to the head, differentiate the lutungs from the surilis.

== Habitat and distribution ==
Lutungs live in forests. They often prefer rainforests, although they are occasionally also found in secluded mountain forests and limestone karst forests. Lutungs are found in South-east Asia and parts of South Asia, from India in the west to China in the east.

== Behaviour ==
Lutungs spend the largest part of the day in the trees, where they walk along the branches on all fours.They also jump from tree to tree, often covering long distances between trees; those long jumps are referred to as leaping. Lutungs are diurnal, although more active in the early mornings and the afternoon.

They live in groups of five to 20 animals, mostly in harems, i.e. a single male with several females. Young males must leave their birth group when fully mature, often forming bachelor groups. If a new male takes over a harem, defeating or scaring off the former harem leader, he often kills the infants in the group. This behavior is also known as infanticide. Lutungs are territorial, and emit loud calls to defend their territories from rival males, resorting to force if the outsiders are not scared off. They have a common repertoire of sounds with which they warn group members. Mutual grooming also plays an important role in maintaining the bonds between individuals.

Lutungs are herbivores, primarily eating leaves, fruits, and buds. To digest the tough leaves, they developed a multichambered stomach.

=== Reproduction ===
Lutungs typically give birth to a single young, after a seven-month gestation period. Twins occur, but are rare. Newborns usually have golden-yellow or orange fur. The mother shares responsibilities of rearing the young with the other females ("aunties") of the harem. Females within a group hand the young around, play with them, carry them, and cuddle them, allowing the mother to forage or spend time alone. If the mother dies, another female adopts the young animal. Lutungs are weaned in the latter half of their first year, and reach full maturity at 4 to 5 years. The life expectancy is estimated at 20 years.
