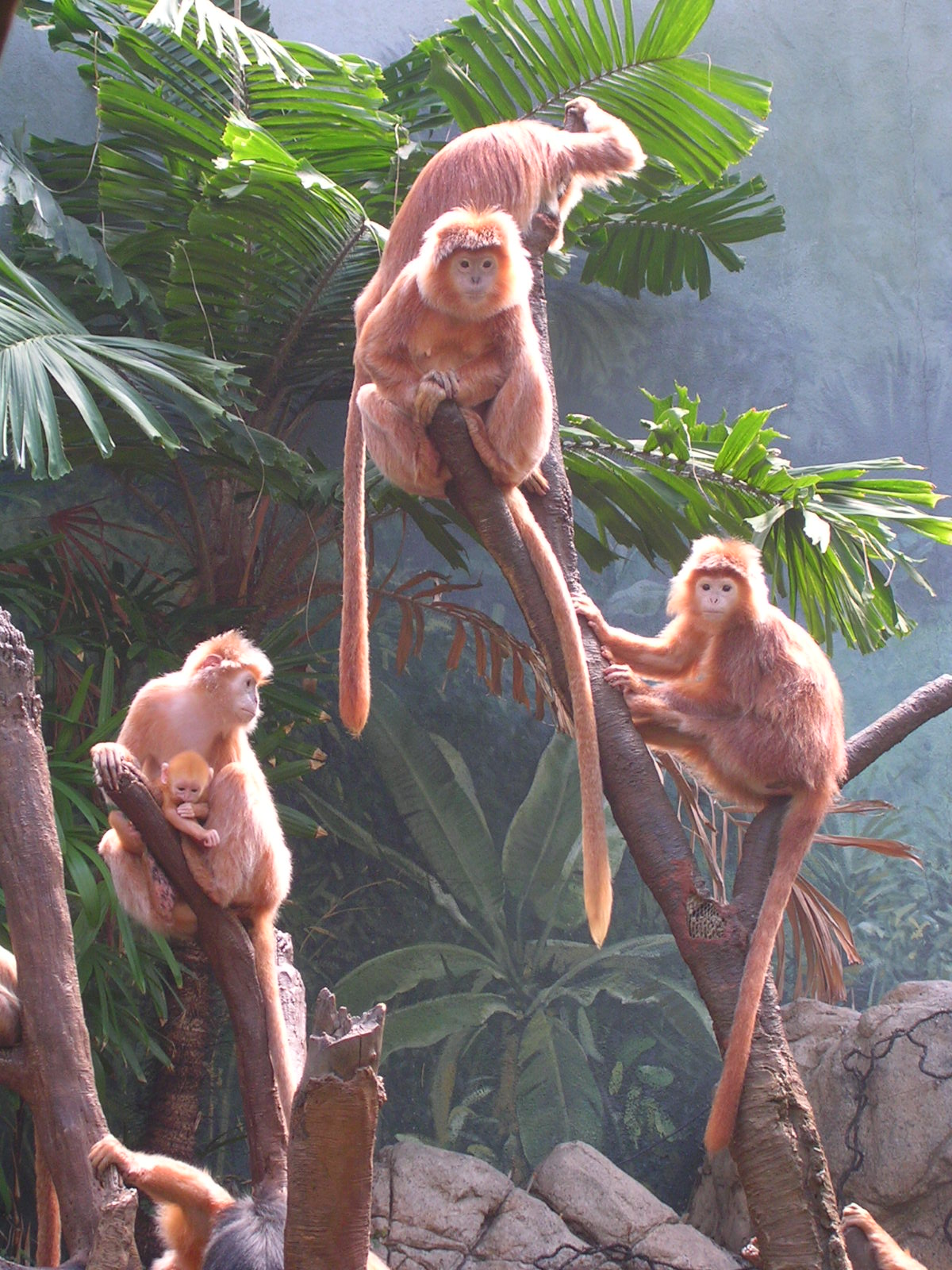

Conservation status
- Vulnerable (IUCN 3.1)

Scientific classification
- Kingdom: Animalia
- Phylum: Chordata
- Class: Mammalia
- Order: Primates
- Family: Cercopithecidae
- Genus: Trachypithecus
- Species group: Trachypithecus cristatus group
- Species: T. auratus

Binomial name
- Trachypithecus auratus É. Geoffroy, 1812
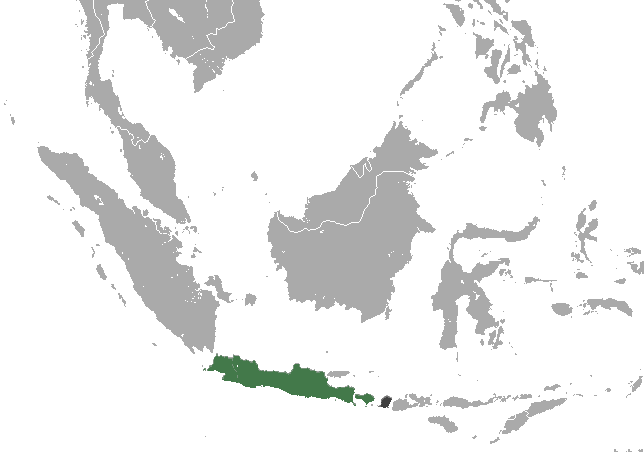
- Javan langur range, including both Trachypithecus auratus and Trachypithecus mauritius (green — native, dark gray — origin uncertain)

= East Javan langur =

Species of Old World monkey

The East Javan langur (Trachypithecus auratus), also known as the ebony lutung, Javan langur or Javan lutung, is an Old World monkey from the Colobinae subfamily. It is most commonly glossy black with a brownish tinge to its legs, sides, and "sideburns". It is found on the island of Java, as well as on several of the surrounding Indonesian islands. The Latin word auratus in its scientific name means "golden" and refers to a less common color variant. The common name golden langur refers to a different species.

== Description ==
Like all langurs, this species' tail is noticeably long, measuring up to 98 cm in length while the body is only around 55 cm long. The two subspecies of this monkey are fairly similar in appearance and are geographically separated; males and females are both usually glossy black, although the females pale, yellowish-white patch around the pubic area. Juveniles of both subspecies are orange in color. The nominate subspecies Trachypithecus auratus auratus has a rare morph that does not lose its juvenile coloration when it matures, instead, the coloration darkens slightly, with yellow tinges on its sides, limbs, and around its ears, and a black tinge on its back.

== Habitat ==
The East Javan langur inhabits the interior and peripheral areas of rainforests.

This primate is diurnal and arboreal. Its diet is primarily herbivorous, eating leaves, fruit, flowers, and flower buds, although it also eats insect larvae. As with other colobines, it has evolved a specialised stomach to digest plant material more efficiently. This species also has enlarged salivary glands to assist it in breaking down food.

== Behavior ==
Like other langurs, the East Javan langur is a social animal, living in groups of around seven individuals, with one or two adult males in the group. Although they will look after offspring of other mothers as well as their own, adult females are aggressive towards females from other groups. The brighter coloring of juveniles may alert females to their presence and ensure that they will always be noticed and protected. This species has no discernible mating season and females produce one offspring at a time.

== Subspecies ==
Formerly there were two subspecies of Trachypithecus auratus recognized:

- Eastern Javan langur or spangled ebony lutung, Trachypithecus auratus auratus
- Western Javan langur, Trachypithecus auratus mauritius

Roos et al., 2008, elevated T. a. mauritius to a separate species as Trachypithecus mauritius.

== Gallery ==
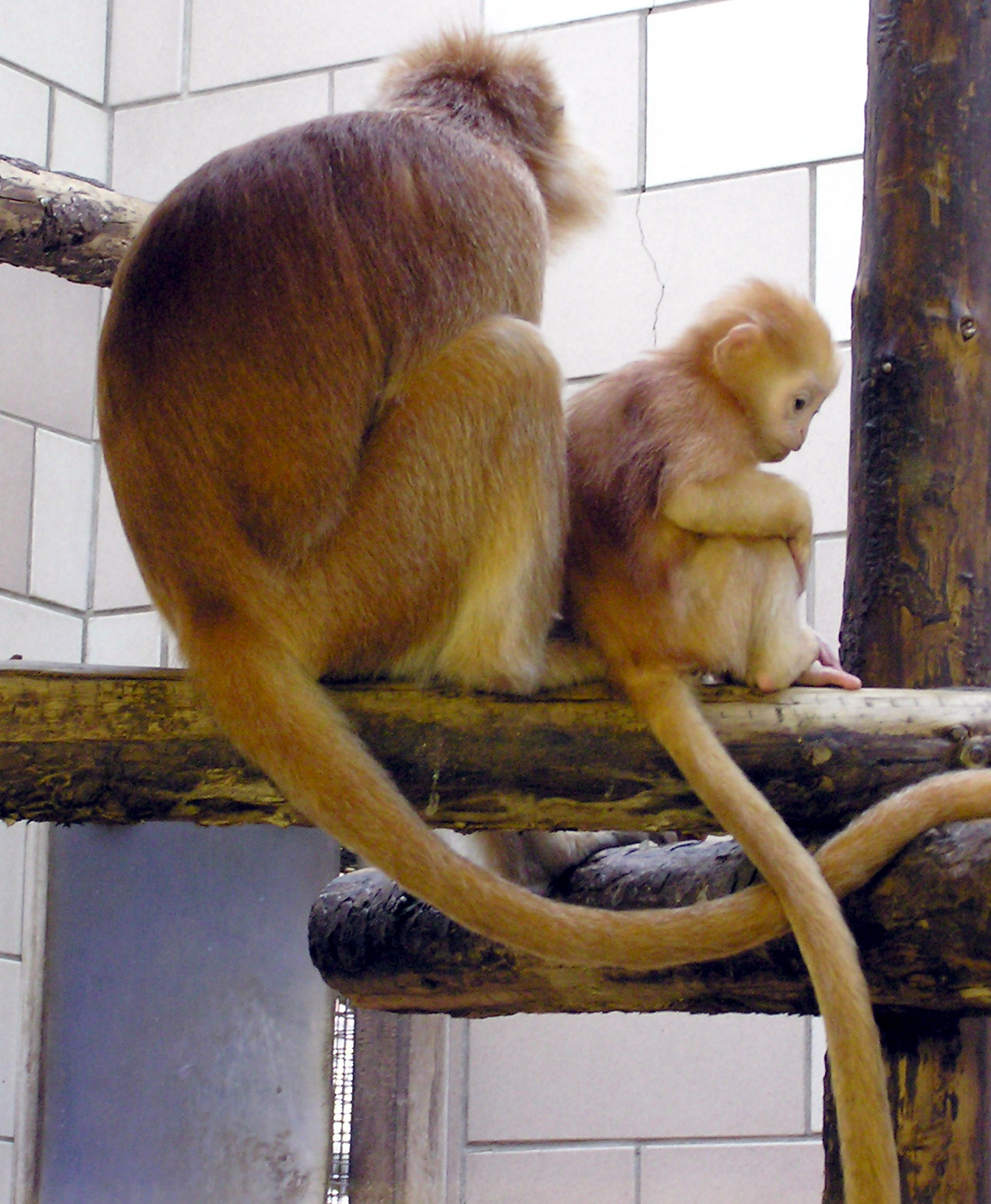
Javan lutung Trachypithecus auratus auratus (light morph) in Bristol zoo

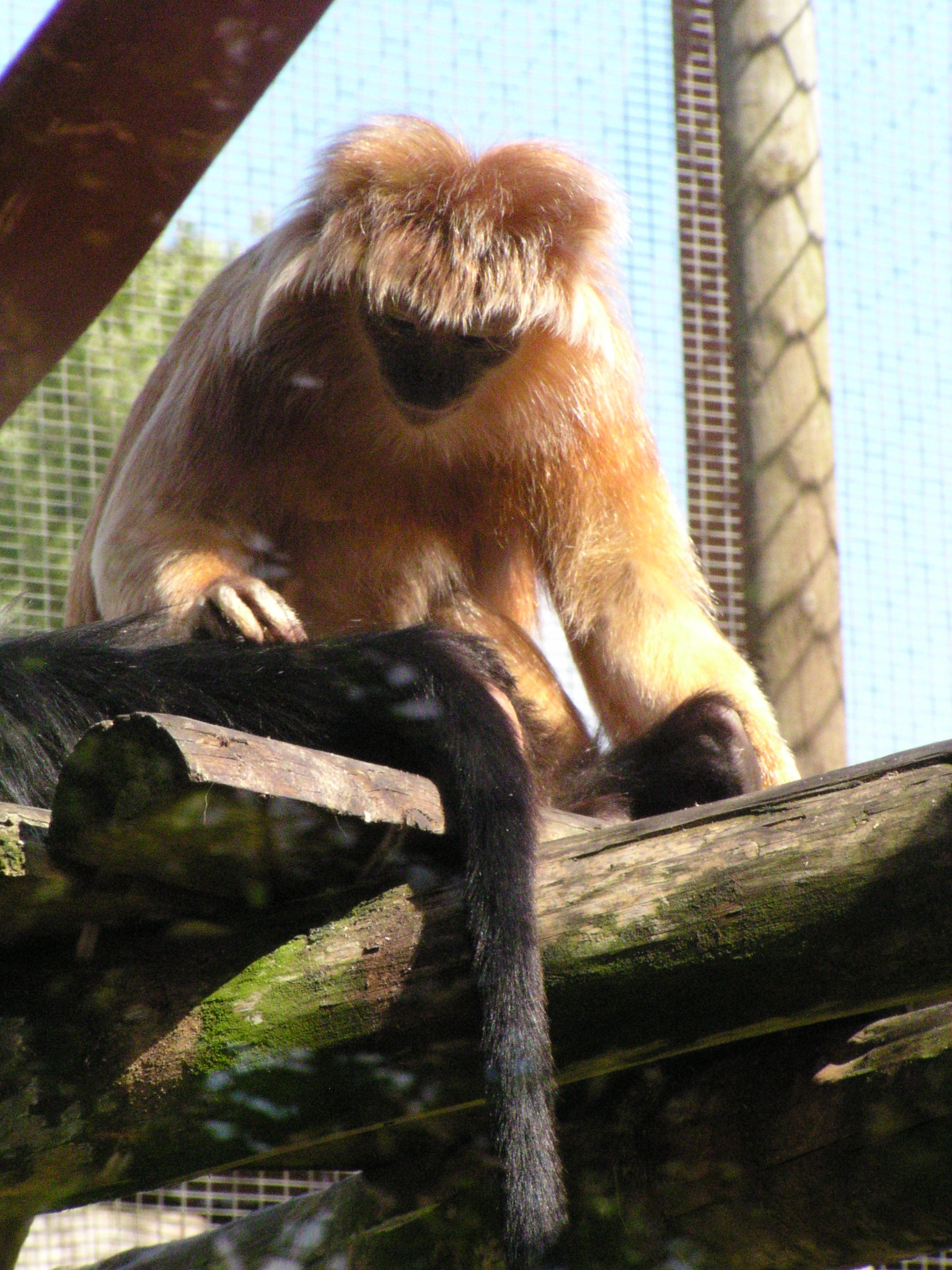
Javan lutung Trachypithecus auratus auratus (light morph) Twycross Zoo, August 2006

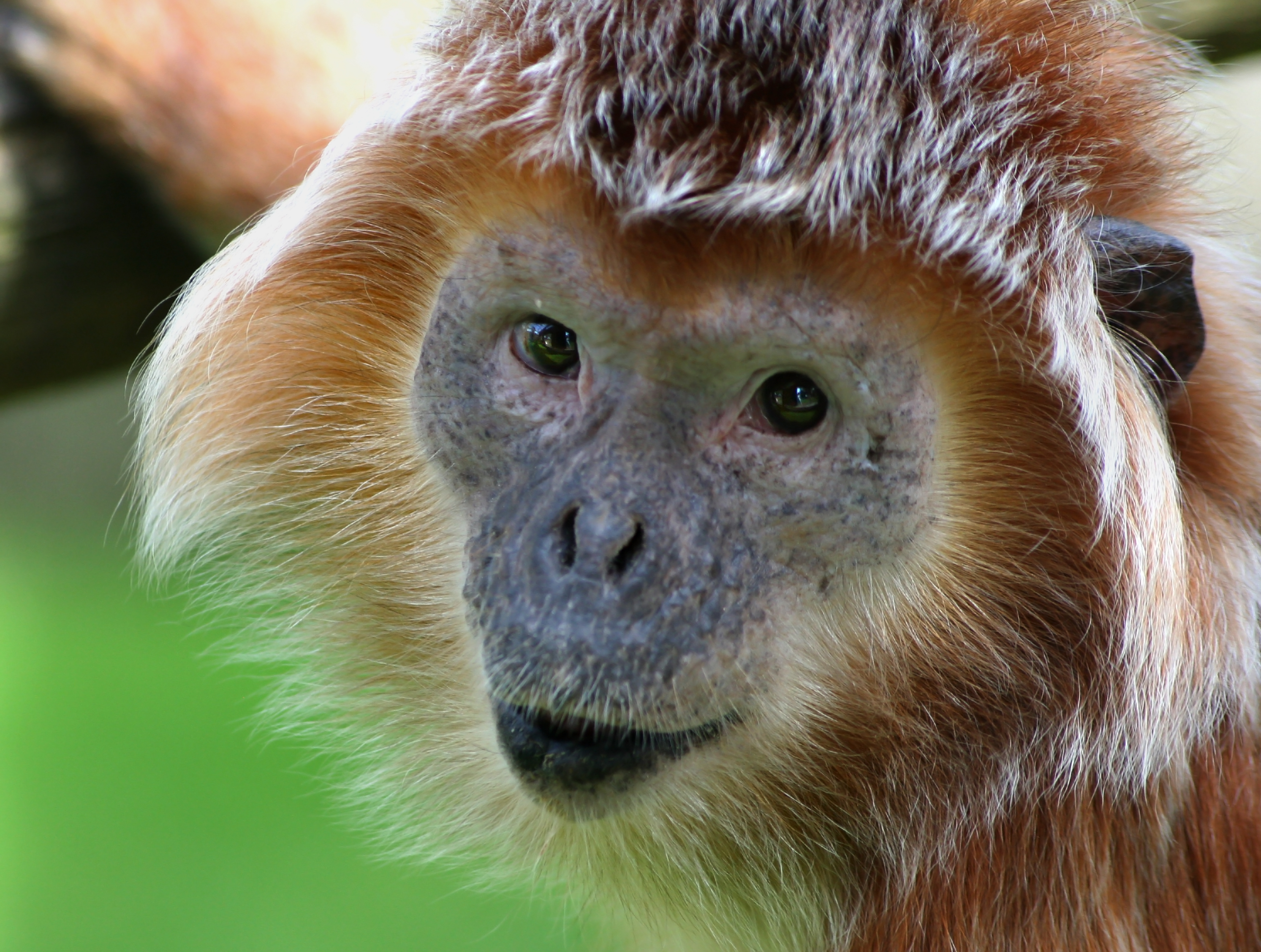
Twycross zoo

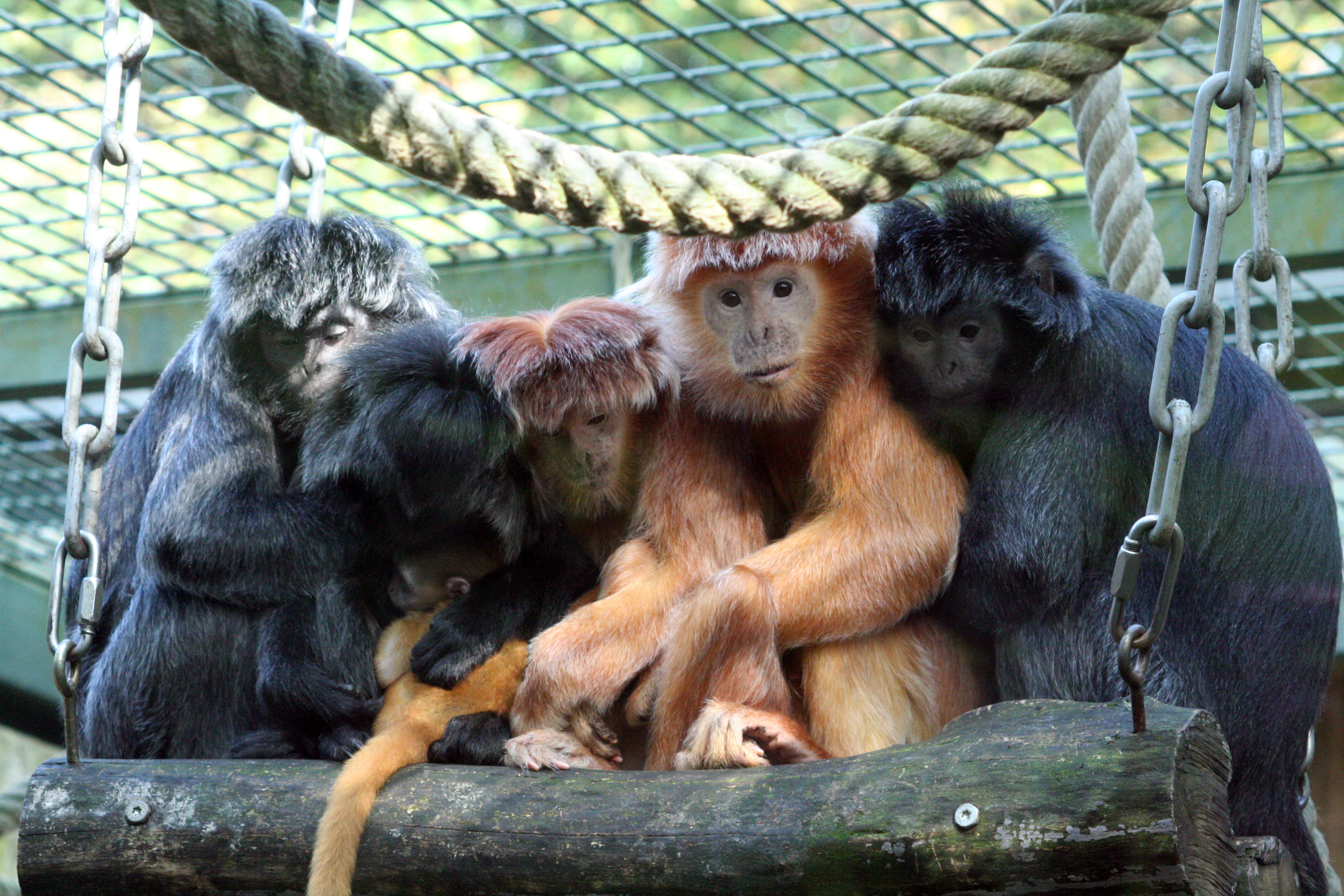
Group, Zoo Hannover, Germany

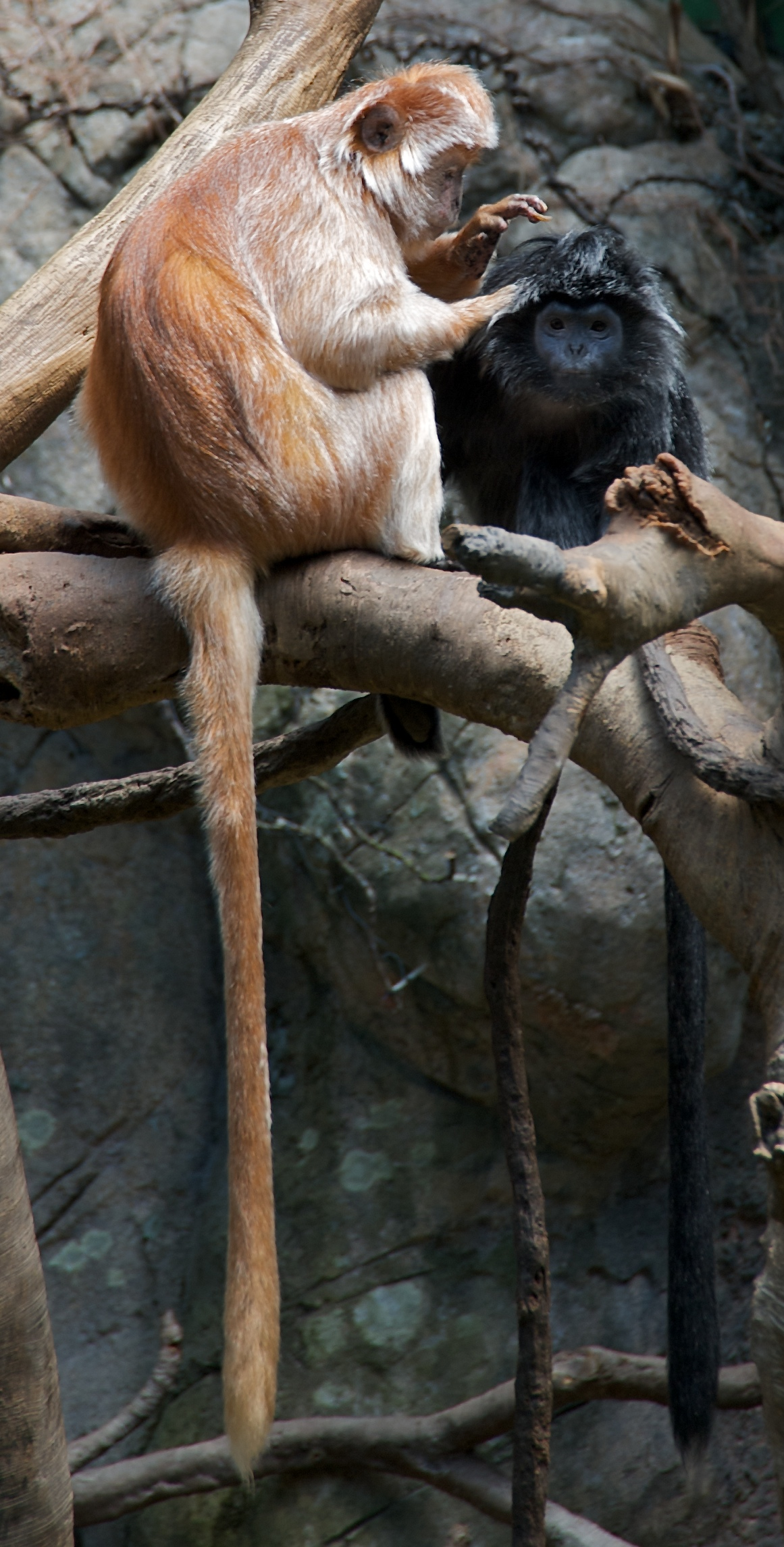
Bronx Zoo

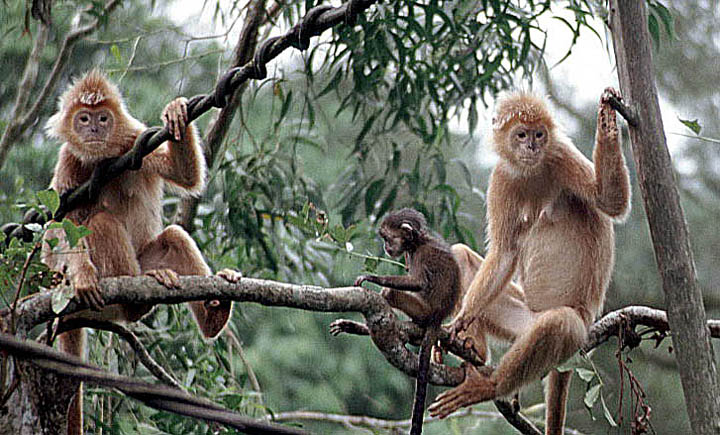
Singapore Zoo

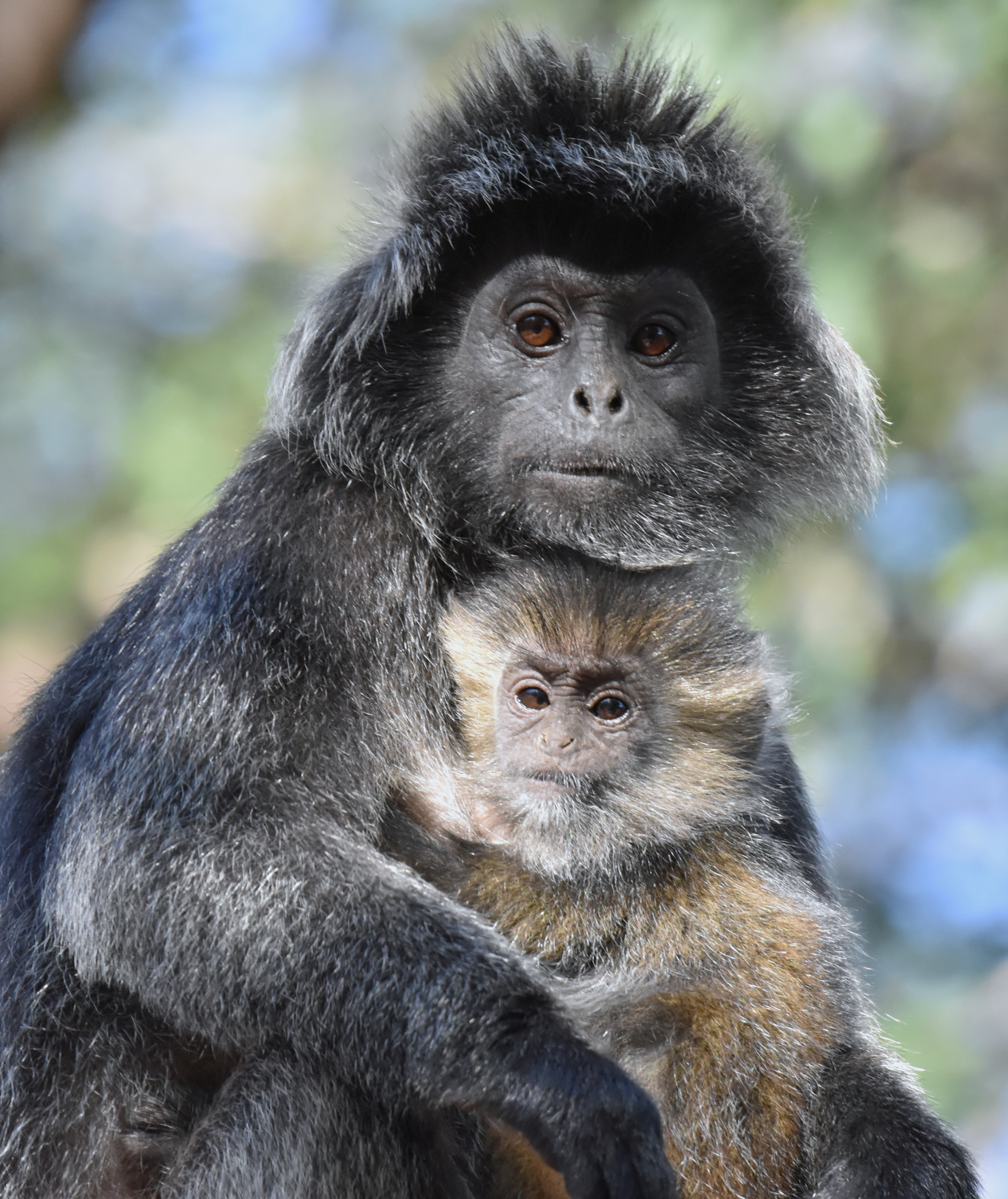
Baluran National Park

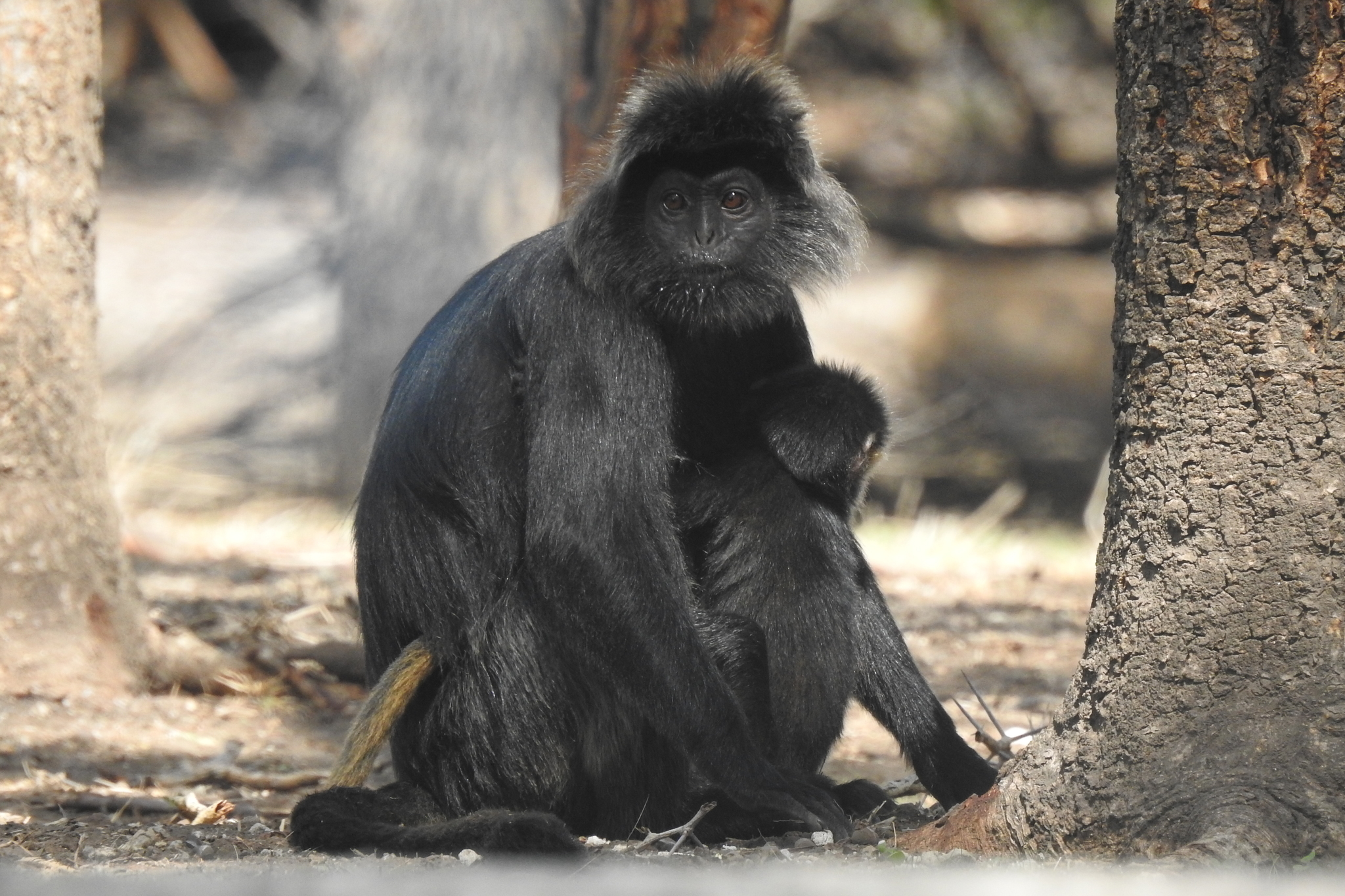
East Java
