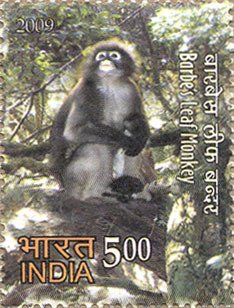

Conservation status
- Vulnerable (IUCN 3.1)

Scientific classification
- Kingdom: Animalia
- Phylum: Chordata
- Class: Mammalia
- Infraclass: Placentalia
- Order: Primates
- Family: Cercopithecidae
- Genus: Trachypithecus
- Species: T. barbei

Binomial name
- Trachypithecus barbei (Blyth, 1847)
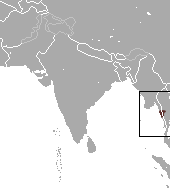
- Tenasserim lutung range

= Tenasserim lutung =

Species of Old World monkey

The Tenasserim lutung (Trachypithecus barbei) is a species of Old World monkey. It is found in Myanmar and Thailand.

It is named after the Tenasserim Hills.

Phylogenetic evidence indicates that the Tenasserim lutung is an ancestor of the far more widespread Indochinese grey langur (T. crepusculus), with T. crepusculus being a product of ancient hybridization between the Tenasserim lutung and ancestral obscurus-group langurs.
