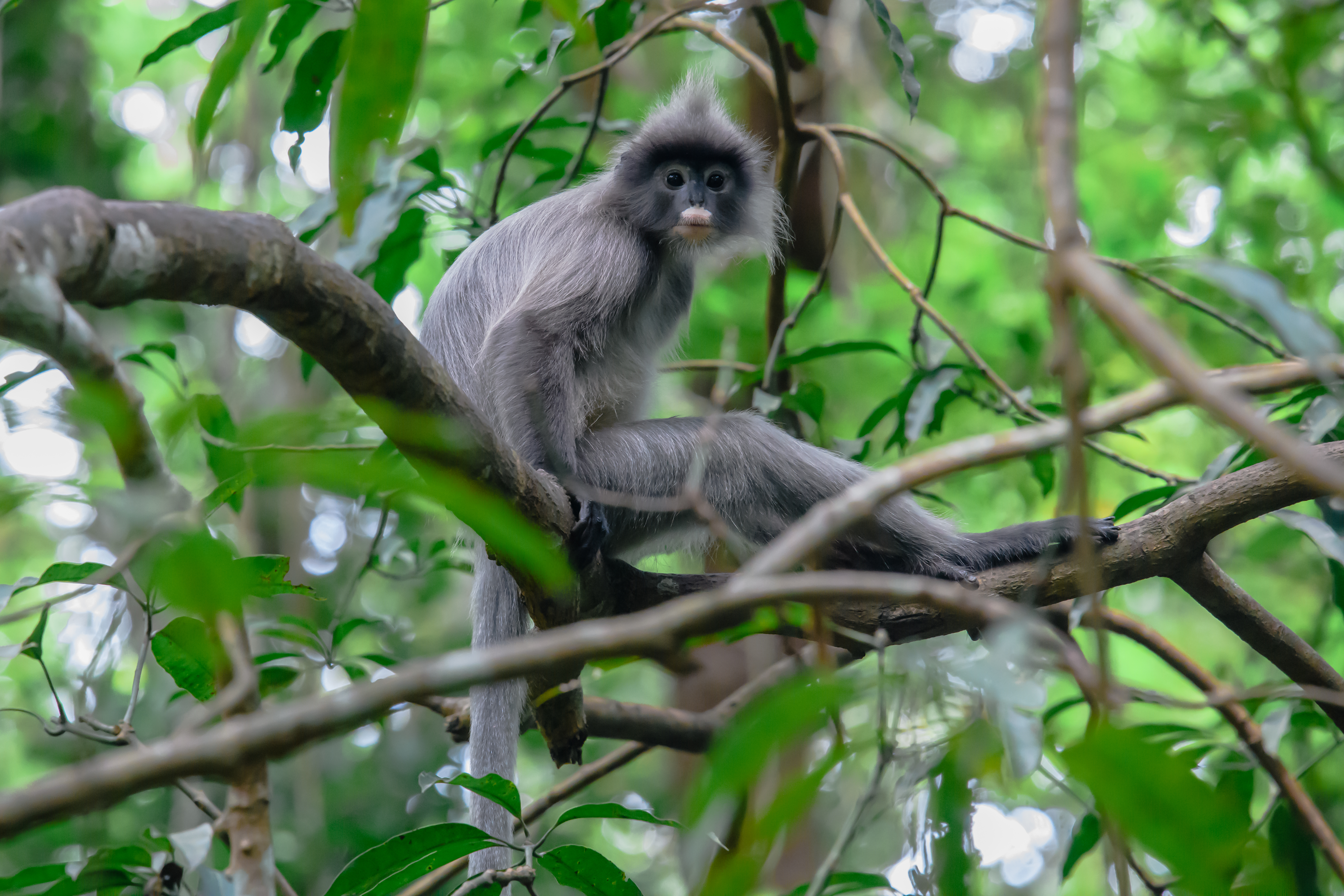

Conservation status
- Endangered (IUCN 3.1)

Scientific classification
- Kingdom: Animalia
- Phylum: Chordata
- Class: Mammalia
- Order: Primates
- Suborder: Haplorhini
- Infraorder: Simiiformes
- Family: Cercopithecidae
- Genus: Trachypithecus
- Species: T. crepusculus

Binomial name
- Trachypithecus crepusculus (Elliot, 1909)
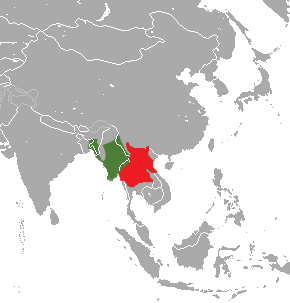
- Indochinese grey langur range in red

Synonyms
- T. phayrei crepuscula

= Indochinese grey langur =

Species of monkey

The Indochinese grey langur (Trachypithecus crepusculus) is a species of Old World monkey native to East and Southeast Asia.

== Taxonomy ==
It was formerly considered conspecific with Phayre's leaf monkey (T. phayrei), but a 2009 study found it to be a distinct species and the most basal member of the T. obscurus lineage, which contains several other species. Later studies have also found it to be a hybrid species originating from ancient hybridization between ancestral obscurus-group langurs and the Tenasserim lutung (T. barbei).

== Distribution ==
This species is found throughout Indochina, from northern Thailand east to Vietnam and west to eastern Myanmar, and ranges north to southern China south of the Salween River.

== Habitat and ecology ==
Unlike langurs that live in karst forests, which have a largely terrestrial lifestyle, the Indochinese grey langur inhabits old-growth evergreen forests and has a largely arboreal lifestyle.

== Threats ==
This species' population is only thought to have about 2,400 to 2,500 mature individuals. It is threatened by habitat destruction and, especially in Vietnam and Laos, hunting, the latter of which is thought to have led to rapid declines in the species.
