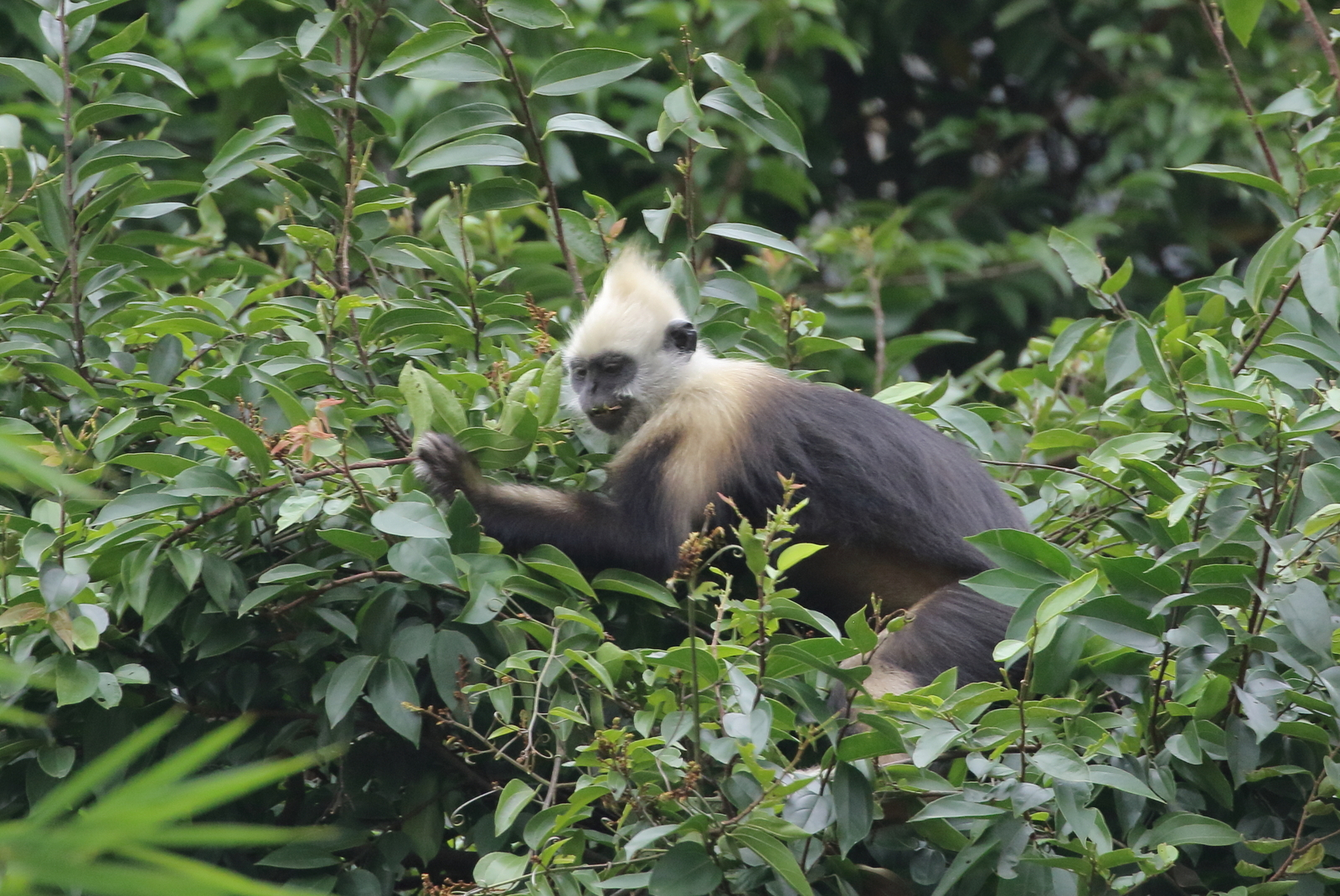

Conservation status
- Critically Endangered (IUCN 3.1)

Scientific classification
- Kingdom: Animalia
- Phylum: Chordata
- Class: Mammalia
- Order: Primates
- Suborder: Haplorhini
- Family: Cercopithecidae
- Genus: Trachypithecus
- Species group: Trachypithecus francoisi group
- Species: T. leucocephalus

Binomial name
- Trachypithecus leucocephalus Tan, 1957

Synonyms
- T. poliocephalus leucocephalus

= White-headed langur =

Species of monkey

The white-headed langur (Trachypithecus leucocephalus) is a Critically Endangered species of langur endemic to Guangxi, China.

== Taxonomy ==
It was formerly considered a subspecies of the Cat Ba langur (T. poliocephalus), which is now thought to be endemic to Vietnam.

Its taxonomy was previously uncertain; it has been considered a partially albinistic population of the François' langur (T. francoisi), a subspecies of Francois' langur, a valid species (T. leucocephalus), or a subspecies, T. poliocephalus leucocephalus. However, the IUCN Red List assessors and American Society of Mammalogists now recognize it as a distinct species based on a 2007 study which split both species.

Populations of the white-headed langur in Chongzuo and Fusui County display notable genetic divergence from the rest of the species, and it has thus been proposed they be treated as evolutionarily significant units.

== Description ==
The white-headed langur is blackish in color with white crown, cheeks, and neck (in contrast to the similar T. poliocephalus, which has a golden crown, cheeks, and neck).

== Distribution ==
The white-headed langur has a very small range in the province of Guangxi in southernmost China, endemic to karst hills, where it is known from a few scattered populations. The Zuo River separates its range from that of the François' langur farther north.

== Status ==
The white-headed langur is listed as Critically Endangered on the IUCN Red List and is thought to have a population of no more than 600 individuals with roughly 250 mature individuals. None of the subpopulations has more than 25 individuals. It is mainly threatened by poaching and to a lesser extent habitat destruction. In addition, François' langurs have been released within its range, and they have been known to hybridize with white-headed langurs, which may be genetically detrimental to it. The species has very low genetic diversity. Habitat fragmentation and anthropogenic land modification have negatively affected this, while other reasons may include its relatively short evolutionary history and restricted population size.
