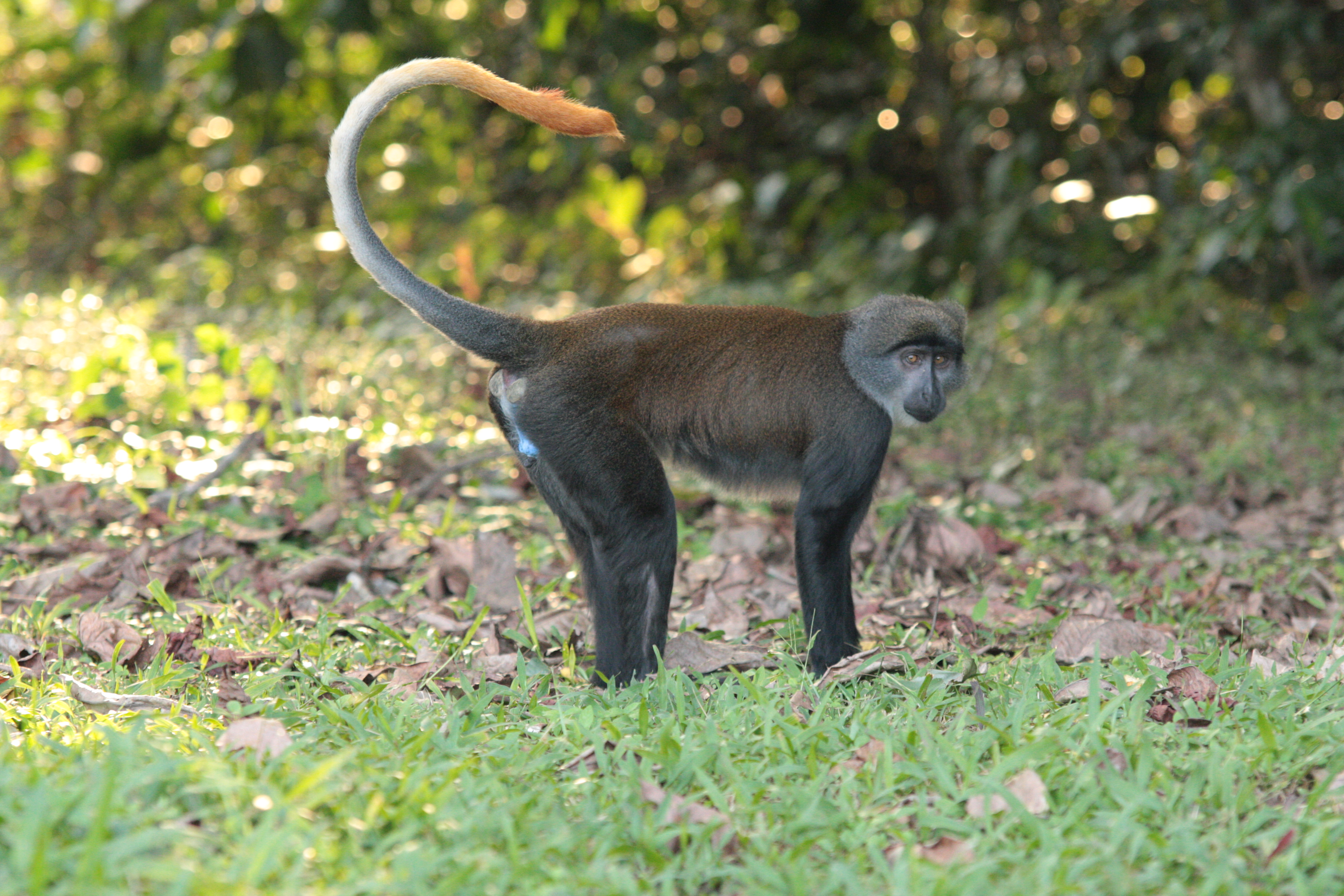

Conservation status
- Near Threatened (IUCN 3.1)

Scientific classification
- Kingdom: Animalia
- Phylum: Chordata
- Class: Mammalia
- Order: Primates
- Family: Cercopithecidae
- Genus: Allochrocebus
- Species: A. solatus

Binomial name
- Allochrocebus solatus M. J. S. Harrison, 1988
- Geographic range

Synonyms
- Cercopithecus solatus M. J. S. Harrison, 1988; Allochrocebus solatus — Mittermeier, Rylands & Wilson, 2013

= Sun-tailed monkey =

Species of Old World monkey

The sun-tailed monkey (Allochrocebus solatus) from Gabon is one of the least studied primates in its habitat. It was discovered as a new species in 1988, and is classified as a guenon, which is a member of the genus Cercopithecus, but was subsequently moved to the genus Allochrocebus. It is closely related to A. preussi and A. Ihoesti, which has been determined by chromosomal analysis. Sun-tailed monkeys prefer shady areas with dense vegetation. However, even after small amounts of logging activity, populations can be unaffected. Much of their diet remains unknown and is still being studied, but they are known to prefer fruit. Their social groups are made up of one male and multiple females. Generally, the sun-tailed monkey is less aggressive towards related individuals, which is noteworthy because it has been found that, in other primate species, aggression rates towards related individuals are generally as high or higher than aggression rates towards non-related individuals. Within their social groups, individual monkeys show preference for their mothers over their fathers, and are overall less aggressive to other monkeys that they are associated with spatially.

== Conservation status ==
The Sun-tailed monkey is a Class B protected species under the African Convention and Appendix II of CITES. The Gabonese government gave it protected status in 1994 and some animals are kept there in captivity. Around 10% of the monkey's habitat is in the Lopé National Park, but the highest density is at the Foret des Abeilles, which is still unprotected. It is recommended that there should be more monitoring of hunting and logging activity in its habitat, as well as more research into the distribution and biology of the species in general. Occasionally, there have been reports of monkeys raiding crops in local villages. However, there is not much study into how these interactions with humans affect the populations as a whole.

== Biochemistry ==
As one of the most poorly known nonhuman primate species with only one semi-captive population in the world, not much is known about its genome or biochemistry. However, there has been some research conducted into the blood biochemistry of the animal. Blood analysis of the sun-tailed monkey reveals that males show higher levels of hemoglobin and hematocrit than females. Females, however, showed higher levels of cholesterol and had higher neutrophil counts. In general, as the monkey ages, levels of blood urea increase and albumin protein levels decrease, which suggest declining liver, kidney and muscle function through life.
