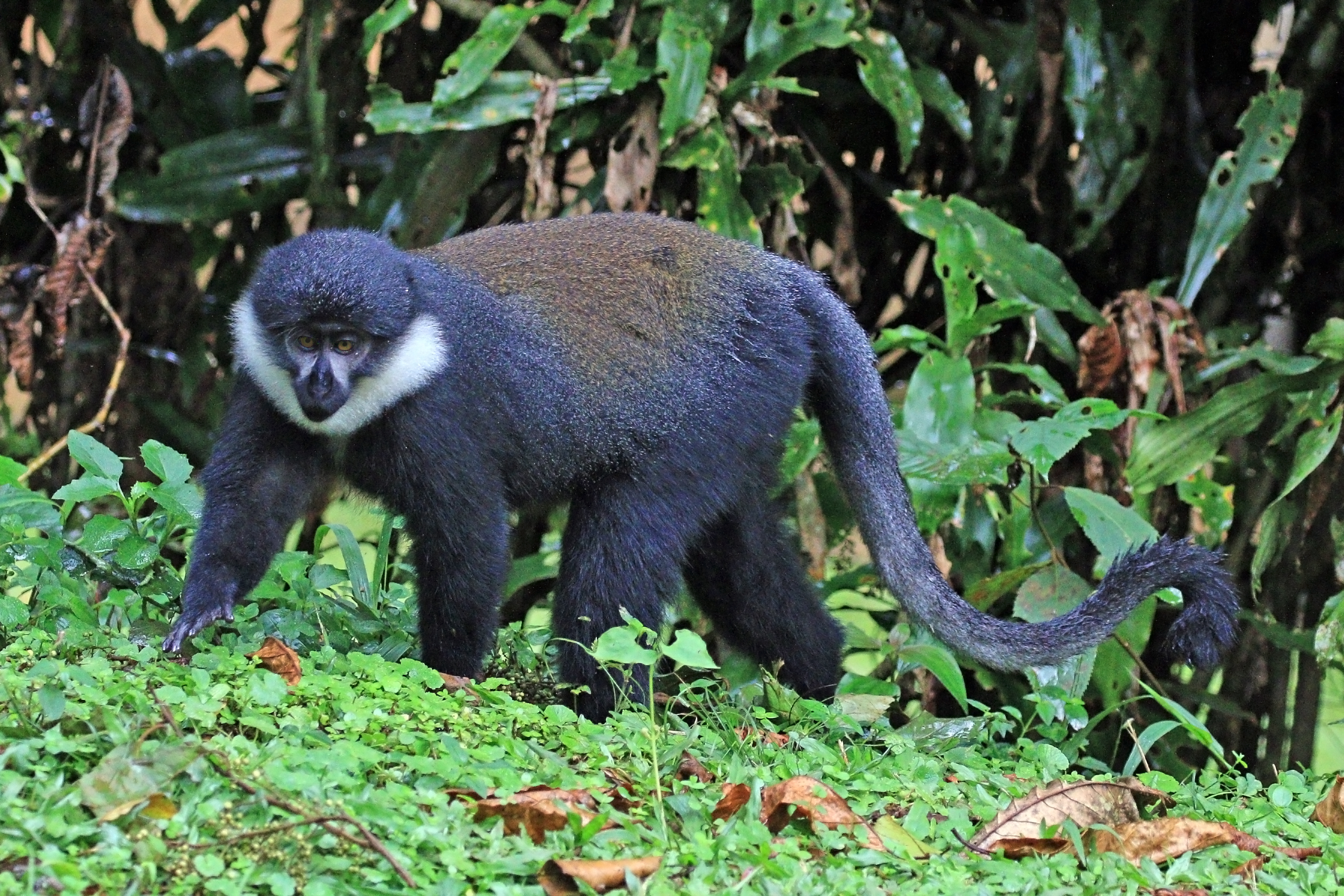
- At the Bwindi Impenetrable Forest, Uganda

Conservation status
- Vulnerable (IUCN 3.1)

Scientific classification
- Kingdom: Animalia
- Phylum: Chordata
- Class: Mammalia
- Order: Primates
- Family: Cercopithecidae
- Genus: Allochrocebus
- Species: A. lhoesti

Binomial name
- Allochrocebus lhoesti P. Sclater, 1899
- Geographic distribution

= L'Hoest's monkey =

Species of mammal

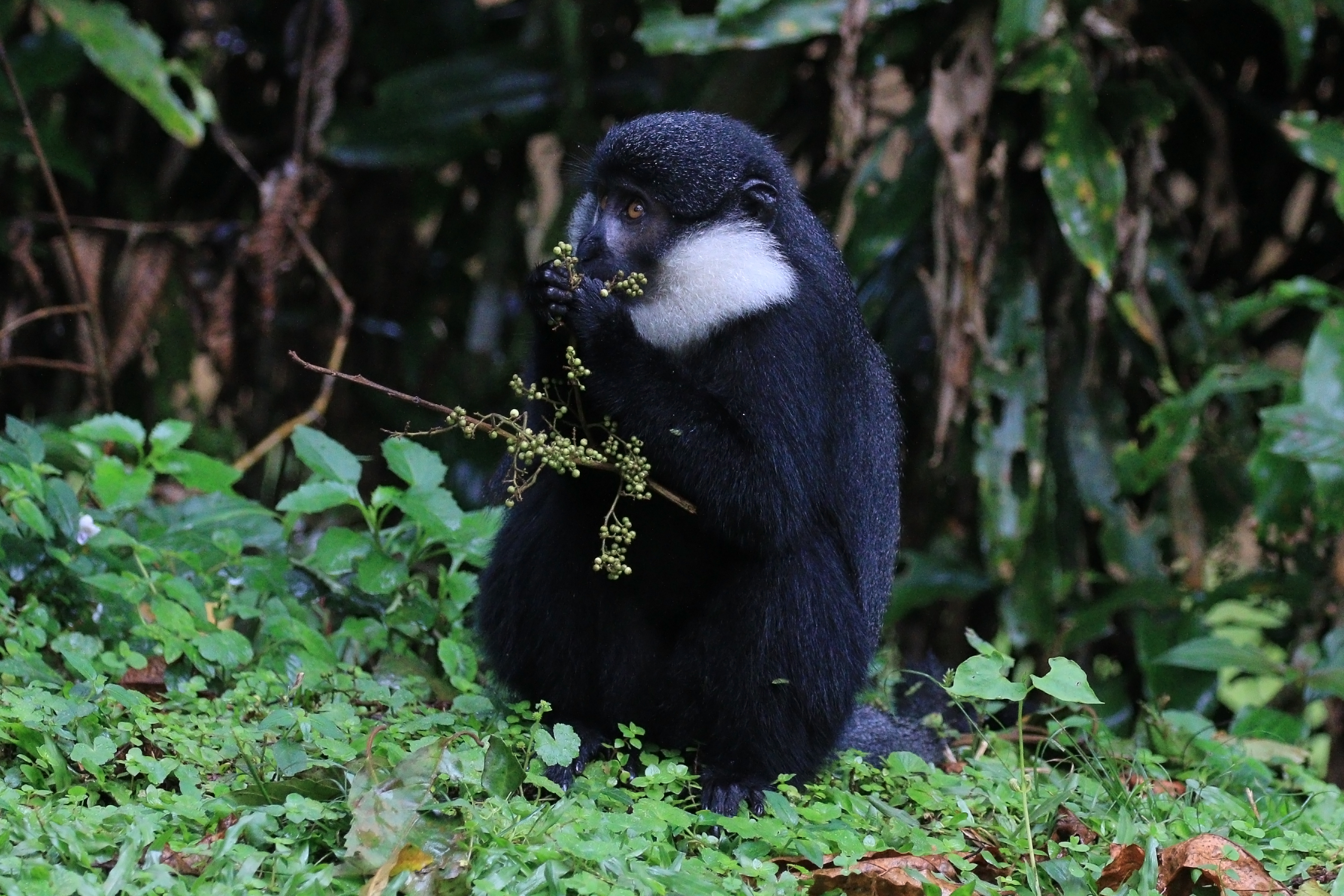
Feeding, Bwindi Impenetrable Forest, Uganda

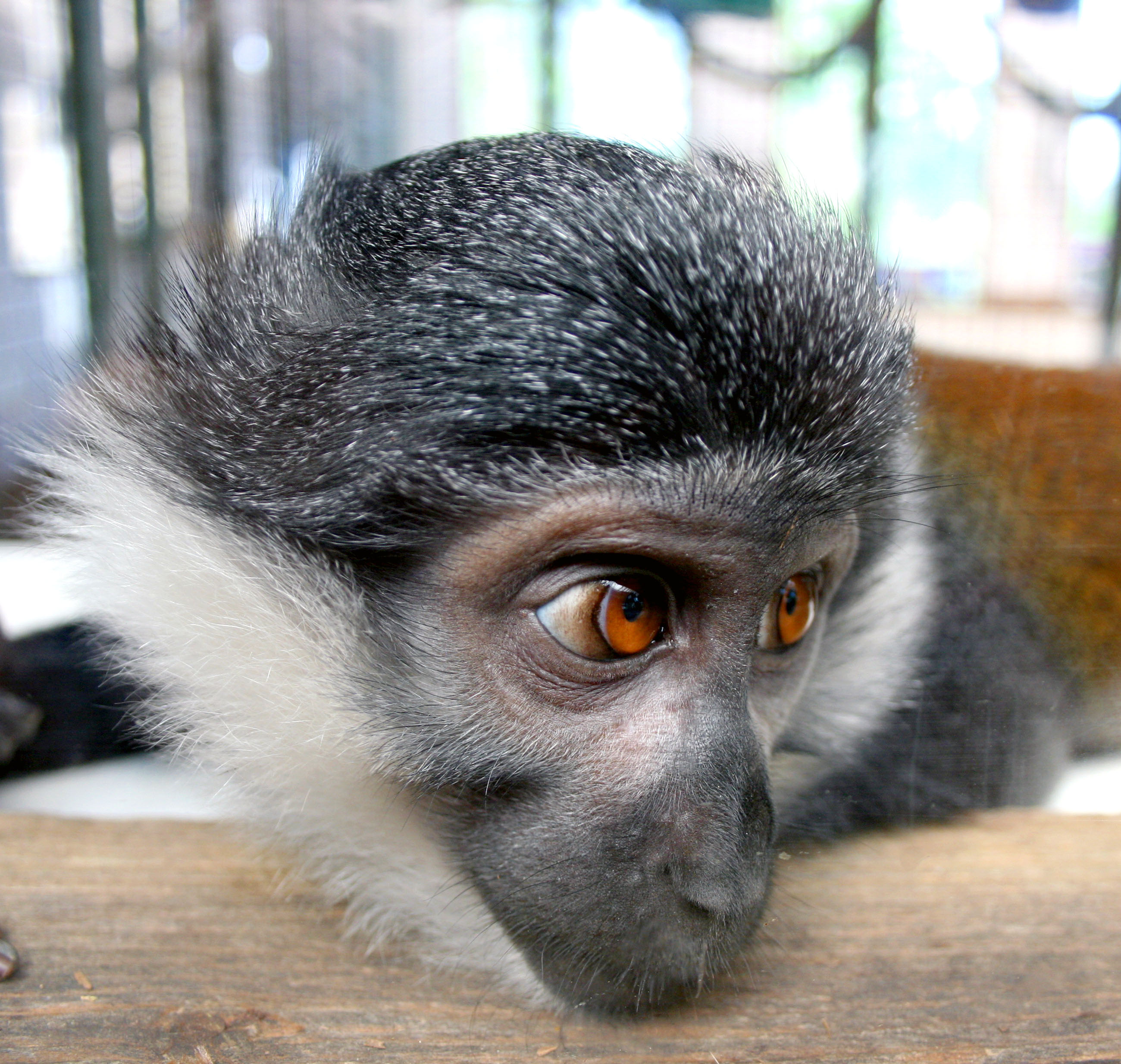
Colchester Zoo, England

L'Hoest's monkey (Allochrocebus lhoesti), also known as the mountain monkey, is a guenon found in the upper eastern Congo Basin. They mostly live in mountainous forest areas in small, female-dominated groups. They have a dark coat and can be distinguished by a characteristic white beard.

== Taxonomy ==
Philip Lutley Sclater originally gave the specific name Cercopithecus lhoesti in honor of François L'Hoëst, director of the Antwerp Zoo, in 1898.

L'Hoest's monkey is currently classified as a member of the genus Allochrocebus. Formerly, L'Hoest's monkey included the taxon preussi from the Gulf of Guinea region as a subspecies, but it is now considered a separate species, Preuss's monkey (A. preussi).

L'Hoest's monkey was formerly included in the genus Cercopithecus. Molecular studies published by Anthony Tosi in 2003 had raised doubts about the classification of L'Hoest's monkey as a member of the genus Cercopithecus. The studies indicated that L'Hoest's monkey (along with the others in its species group) is more closely related to the vervet monkeys of the genus Chlorocebus and the patas monkey (genus Erythrocebus) than to the other guenons of the genus Cercopithecus.

== Physical characteristics ==
C. lhoesti has a short, dark brown coat, with a chestnut color across the back and a dark belly. Its cheeks are light gray with a pale moustache. It has a characteristic and prominent white bib, In body length it is 12.5 to 27 inches (32 to 69 cm), with a 19-to-39-inch (48 to 99 cm) tail. The male weighs about 6 kilograms (13 lb), while the smaller female weighs 3.5 kilograms (7.7 lb). Its tail is long and hook-shaped at the end. They are born fully coated and with their eyes open.

== Habitat and distribution ==
L'Hoest's monkey occurs in northeastern Democratic Republic of the Congo, Rwanda, Burundi, and western Uganda. It is a forest monkey, which is typical of the moist and high primary forests. It will occupy a range of different kinds of forested areas, including gallery forest, mature lowland rain forests, wooded savanna at mountain slopes, and forest borders. However, it also will live on cultivated lands. In lowland forests it shows a preference toward areas where the forest is regenerating, while in mountain areas it will frequent the mature, tangled, undergrowth below the broken canopy. One study found this population only above 900 metres (3,000 ft) but another found it as low as 610 metres (2,000 ft). Another mostly observed it from 1,500 to 2,500 metres (4,900 to 8,200 ft).

== Behavior ==
C. lhoesti lives in fairly small groups dominated by females and have only a single male. The females are usually related, while the male stays only a couple of weeks or at most a couple of years. The adult male will make very loud and distinct calls. They are active during the day, mostly during early morning and late afternoon. They sleep in trees in a sitting position, usually either holding branches or each other. When they are alarmed or see they are being observed, they will flee and take shelter in trees, and after become very still. They are mostly terrestrial.

=== Reproduction ===
L'Hoest's monkey breeds seasonally, with the timing depending on the area. After about a five-month gestation period, a single young will be born. The mother gives birth typically at night and where ever she happens to be at the time. Birth usually occurs at the end of the dry season, which allows lactation when rainfall is highest. She will eat the placenta and lick the baby clean while it hangs on to her belly. The other females in the group will show much interest in the newborn and will try to hold it. After a few months, nursing becomes less frequent, but will continue for about two years when there is another birth. When male offspring reach sexual maturity, they will leave the group. In captivity, they have been known to live for more than 30 years.

=== Diet ===
In the wild, L'Hoest's monkey is primarily a herbivore, which will mostly eat fruit, mushrooms, herbs, roots, and leaves. However, it will also occasionally eat eggs, lizards, and small birds.
