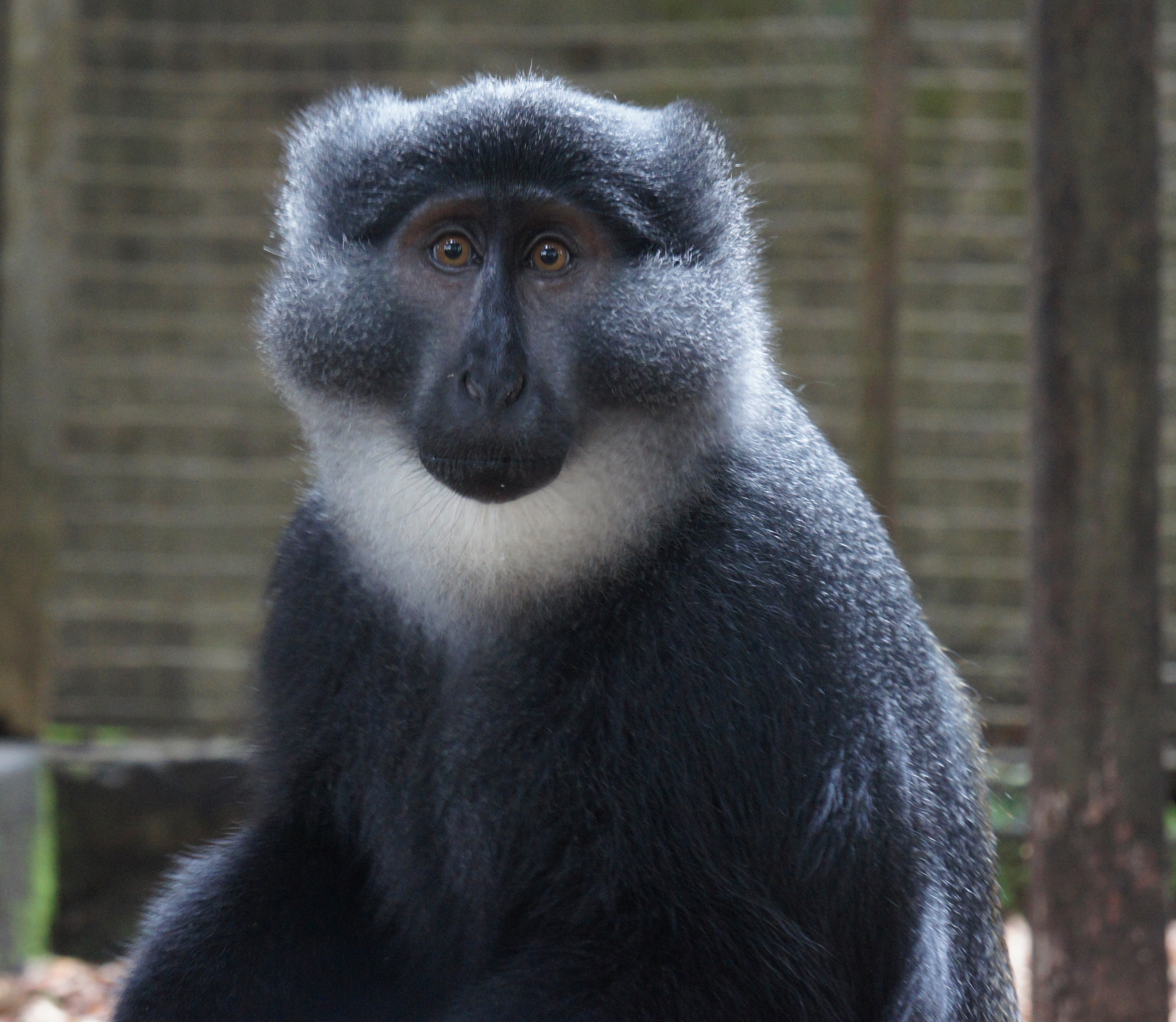

Conservation status
- Endangered (IUCN 3.1)

Scientific classification
- Kingdom: Animalia
- Phylum: Chordata
- Class: Mammalia
- Order: Primates
- Family: Cercopithecidae
- Genus: Allochrocebus
- Species: A. preussi

Binomial name
- Allochrocebus preussi (Matschie, 1898)
- Geographic range

= Preuss's monkey =

Species of Old World monkey

The Preuss's monkey (Allochrocebus preussi), also known as Preuss's guenon, is a diurnal primate that lives terrestrially in mountainous (up to 2500 m) forests of eastern Nigeria, western Cameroon and Bioko in Equatorial Guinea. It was formerly classified as a subspecies of the L'Hoest's monkey (A. lhoesti).

Preuss's monkey is currently classified as a member of the genus Allochrocebus. It was formerly considered a member of the genus Cercopithecus.

The diet of Preuss's monkey is primarily fruit, leaves and insects, although the species occasionally raids human crops. It is darkish in coloration with a white chin, and adult males have a blue scrotum. Preuss's monkeys weigh up to 10 kg. Troops consist of one adult male and several females and adolescents, averaging 17 total per troop. Females give birth to a single offspring about once every three years. The young mature at 4 years and live to be an average of 31 years.

Preuss's monkey is an endangered species, due to habitat loss and hunting. It is one of the species that live in the Guinean Forests of the West Africa Biodiversity Hotspot.

Preuss's monkey is known to occur in captivity at the Centre for Education, Rehabilitation, and Conservation of Primates and Nature (CERCOPAN) in Cross River State, Nigeria and the Limbe Wildlife Centre in Limbe, South-West Region, Cameroon.

There are two subspecies of Preuss's monkey:

- Cameroon Preuss's monkey, Cercopithecus preussi preussi
- Bioko Preuss's monkey, Cercopithecus preussi insularis
