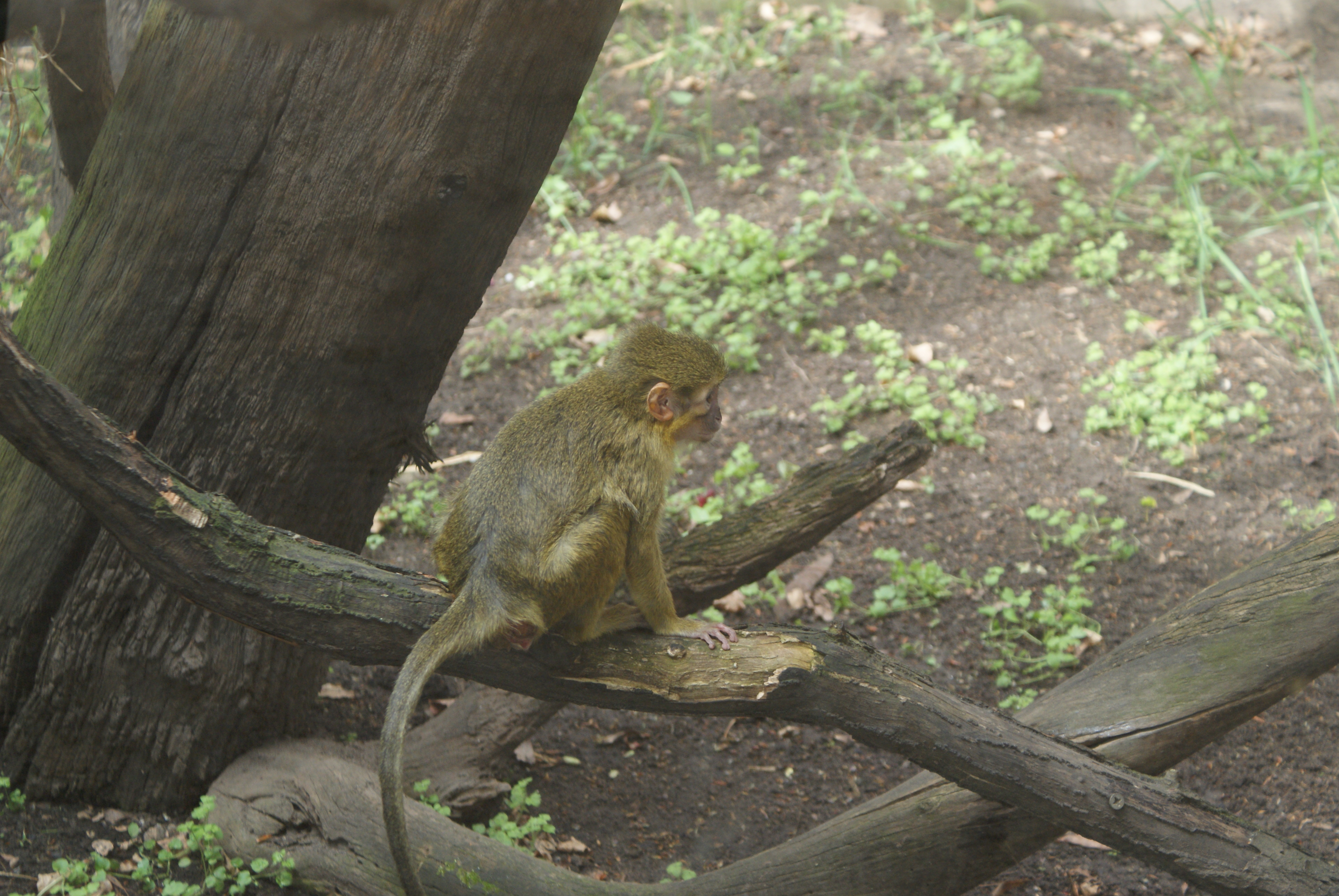
- Gabon talapoin in Prague Zoo, Czech Republic

Conservation status
- Near Threatened (IUCN 3.1)

Scientific classification
- Kingdom: Animalia
- Phylum: Chordata
- Class: Mammalia
- Infraclass: Placentalia
- Order: Primates
- Family: Cercopithecidae
- Genus: Miopithecus
- Species: M. ogouensis

Binomial name
- Miopithecus ogouensis Kingdon, 1997
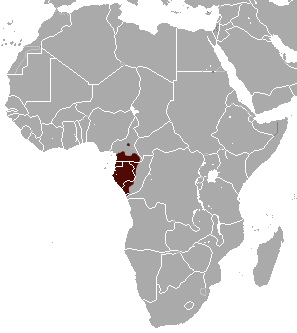
- Gabon talapoin range

= Gabon talapoin =

Species of Old World monkey

The Gabon talapoin (Miopithecus ogouensis), also known as the northern talapoin, is a small species of African monkey native to riparian habitats in Cameroon, Equatorial Guinea, Gabon, the western Republic of the Congo and the far western Democratic Republic of Congo. It may have been introduced to Bioko and the Canary Islands. Classified in the genus Miopithecus, it was given the name Miopithecus ogouensis, based on the River Ogooué, distinguishing it from the other species, the Angolan talapoin, also known as Miopithecus talapoin.

Gabon talapoins are large-headed monkeys with yellow-olive tinted coating and can be differentiated from the Angolan talapoin by its flesh-coloured ears (not blackish). They are always found near watercourses and can dive and swim away when disturbed. Males and females live together in mixed groups, but rarely interact with each other outside of mating season. Females tend to give birth annually during the rainy season, with mating season taking place during the dry season. Its diet constitute of mostly foraged fruits, seeds, leaves and insects, and crops raided from cultivated plantations. The Gabon talapoins are dependent on thick coverings to protect them from predation due to their small size, but their elusiveness have also made it difficult to observe their behaviors in the wild.

The Gabon talapoin is considered as Near Threatened on the IUCN Red List of Threatened Species. Assessed in 2017, its overall population trend is decreasing, with a continuing decline of mature individuals. Conservation efforts have been made to preserve its habitat and control trade on an international level.

== Taxonomy ==
The Gabon talapoin is classified under the Cercopithecidae family, and is one of the only two species under the Miopithecus genus, with the other being the lesser known Miopithecus talapoin, also commonly known as the Angolan talapoin.

The Miopithcus genus was considered monotypic until 1969, when Machado suggested there was a northern and southern species separated by the Congo River. The southern species was described as M. talapoin and the northern species was left undescribed. It was not until 1997 that Jonathan Kingdon gave it the scientific name Miopithecus ogouensis, based on the Ogooué River in Gabon. Kingdon pointed out that the presently used binomial, where the specific name is a reference to the Ogooué River, is a nomen nudum:

A nomen nudum, 'Miopithecus ogouensis' is used here in anticipation of a formal description.

However, it can be argued that his description is valid per ICZN rules, as he included an illustration (thereby possibly providing a valid type), a description, and specifically said the name was intended for this new species, leading later authorities to accept it.

== Description ==
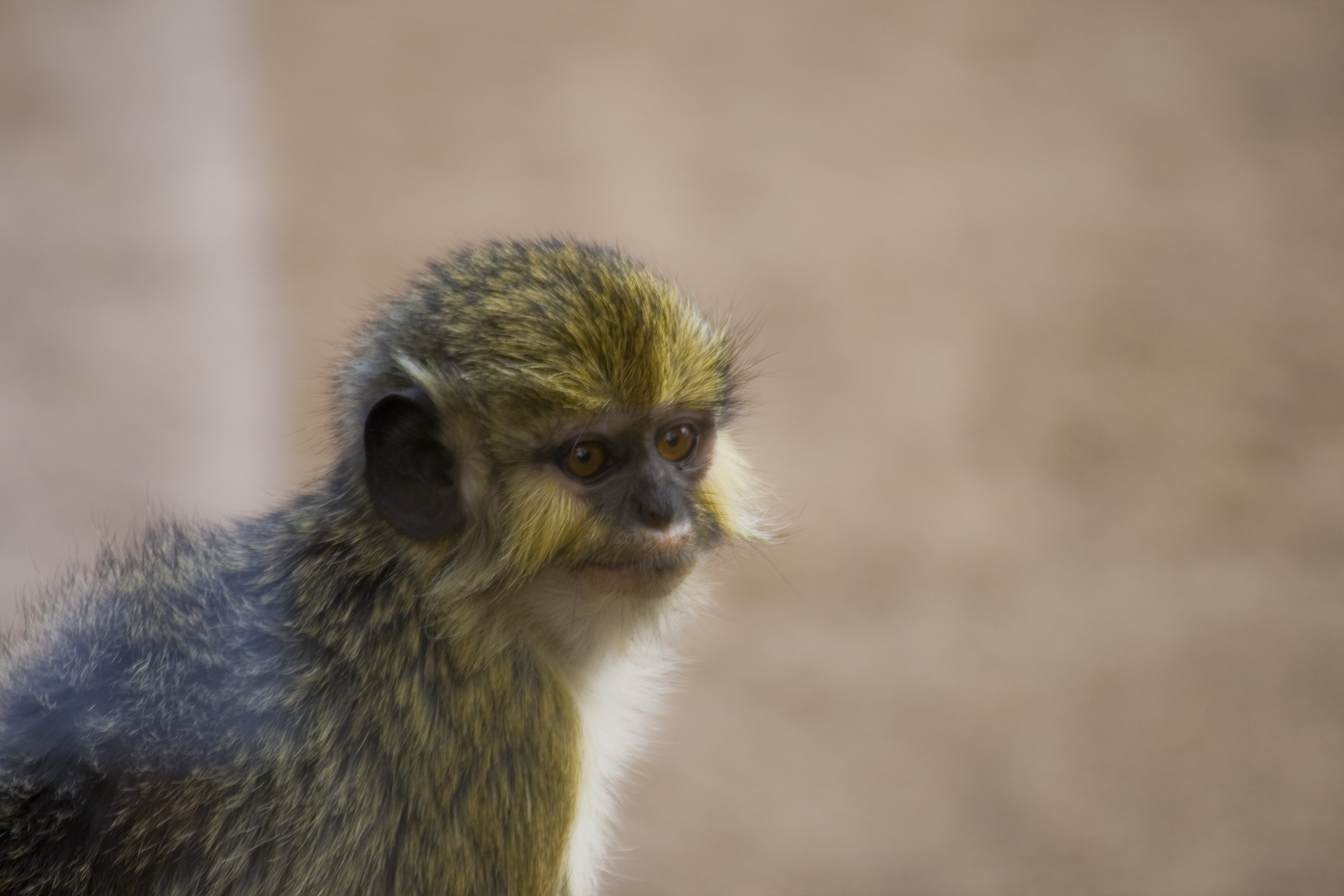
The Angolan talapoin, with dark ears and facial skin unlike the Gabon talapoin

Female Gabon talapoins have a head and body length ranging from 230–340 millimetres (9.1–13.4 in), and weigh 0.8–1.2 kilograms (1.8–2.6 lb). Males are larger and take six years to reach full adult size, with head and body length ranging from 260–360 millimetres (10–14 in), and weigh 1.0–1.72 kilograms (2.2–3.8 lb). Gabon talapoins have an average tail length ranging from 310–450 millimetres (12–18 in). Infants weigh approximately 180 grams (6.3 oz) at birth, and the size of a newborn's head is almost as big as its body.

Gabon talapoins are the smallest of the Old World monkey and are considered as dwarf guenons. They are large headed, and unlike the related Angolan talapoin, the Gabon talapoin has flesh-coloured (not blackish) ears and facial skin. There are no distinct colour differences between mature males and females and the young. The Gabon talapoin is short furred, and has a vivid, grizzled yellow-olive crown and back, with golden-yellow coating to its thin limbs, and a dark tipped tail. Its eyelids and lips are yellowish in colour, with noticeable dark streaks on its nose and cheeks. They also have cheek pouches that are useful for storing food. Females have a pink sexual swelling, and males are characterized by their large pale blue scrotum.

== Geographic distribution ==
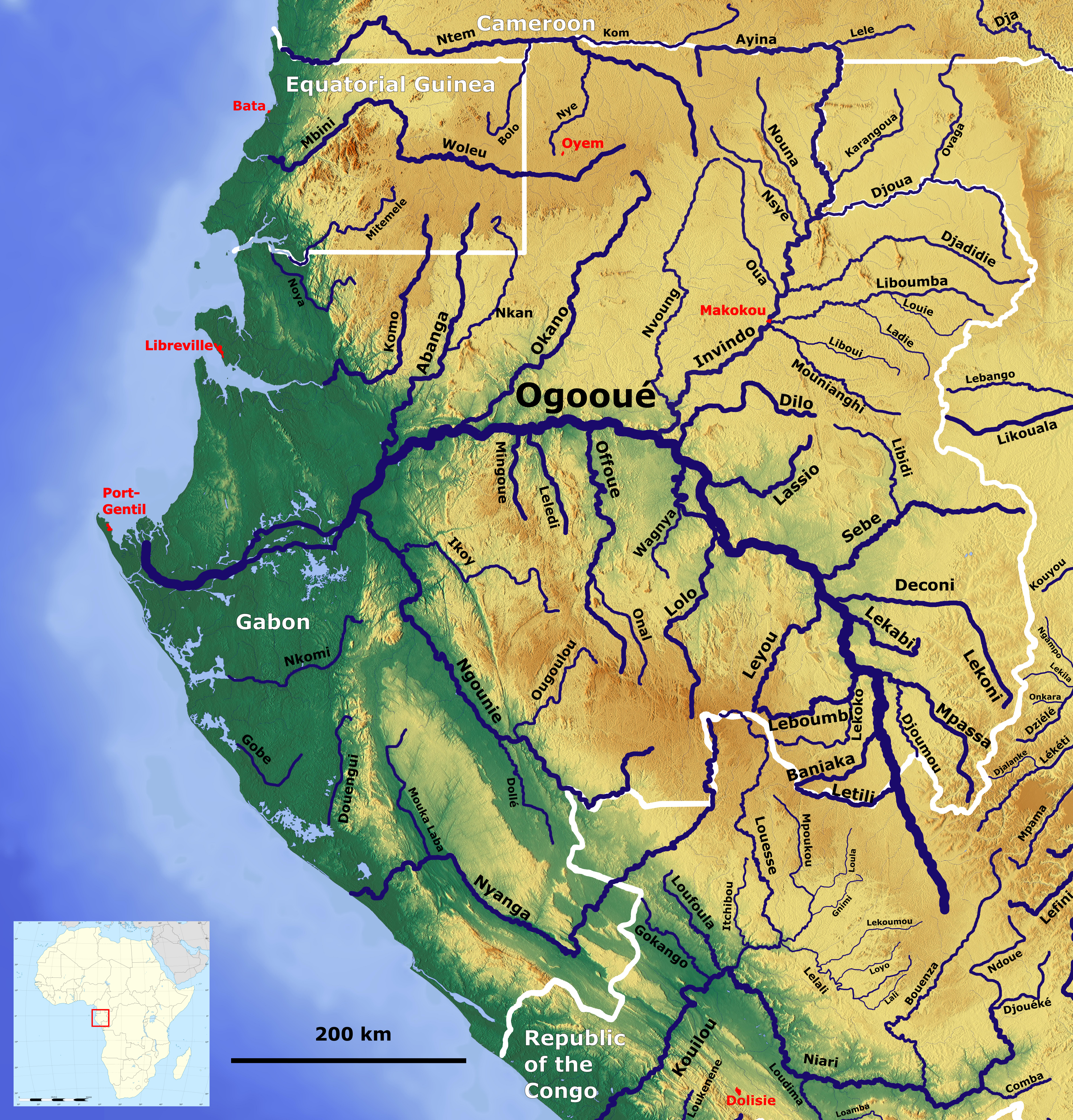
Map of River Ogooué and surrounding rivers of Gabon

Distribution of the Gabon talapoin is centered around the River Ogooué, native to the equatorial coastal ridges between Cabinda and the Nyong River, and further extends to some Congo River branches. It can be found in Cameroon, Equatorial Guinea, Republic of the Congo and the Cabinda province of Angola. Presence of Gabon talapoin have been documented along the Djérem River in the gallery forest, within the transition zone between the Central African forest block and the Guinea-Congolia/Sudania savannas. The distribution of the Gabon talapoin is thought to be even larger, but not all observations have been confirmed.

== Habitat ==
Gabon talapoins are equatorial riverine creatures, and are always found within 500 metres (1,600 ft) of waterbodies such as rivers and swamps. Owing to the nature of its small size, it is reliant on thick coverings to protect against predation. Usually found near dense riverbank vegetation and agriculture, the Gabon talapoin seldom ascends to higher levels in trees. Population density may double near human settlements, due to the availability of new sources of cultivated foods, secondary growth due to land clearing, and protection from predators due to presence of human activity.

== Behavior ==
=== Diet and feeding ===
Gabon talapoins usually look for food on the ground, but such terrestrial foraging is seldom observed due to their small size and preference in inhabiting within dense coverings. Foraging is usually done in sub groups, with one feeding session in the morning and one in the late afternoon.

Fruits make up nearly 80% of the Gabon talapoin's diet, favouring plums (Uapaca), figs, umbrella tree (Musanga) and mokenjo (Pseudospondias), oil-palm nuts, and fruits of African ginger (Aframomum). Insects consist of about one third of its diet, mainly consisting of orthopterans, with the occasional beetles, caterpillars and spiders. Seeds and leaves form part of their diet as well. Cultivated plantations such as bananas, pawpaws and maize are also attractive food sources for the Gabon talapoin. Near human settlements, harvested cassava tubers soaked in rivers are also sought after by the Gabon talapoins when other food sources are scare. Their fruit and insect rich diets also support ecological balance through the dispersion of seeds and maintenance of insect colonies.

=== Social life and reproduction ===
Gabon talapoins are highly social creatures and are not known to be territorial. They live in mixed male and female groups of 12–20, with a larger proportion of females to males. Adult males guide the movements of the group, and safeguard the group by keeping lookouts during the night. Gabon talapoins move in subgroups during their daily travels, with pregnant, lactating females and their babies forming one subgroup; juveniles follow mixed male and females in a separate subgroup; and adult males leading and tailing the group. During daily resting periods, usually between 11:00 a.m. and 2:00 p.m., adult females and the young stay in the center of the group, enclosed by the adult males. Gabon talapoins sleep at night roosts together with other groups, in overhanging vegetation or near water, and are capable of diving and swimming away if alarmed.

Gabon talapoins fall prey to various carnivores, raptors and snakes due to their tiny size. They are capable of 11 types of vocalizations spanning across a wide pitch range. The Gabon talapoin have bird-like calls when disturbed and males often exhibit hostility by bobbing of the head, scowls and lashing of the tail tip. During foraging, adult females let out a short ''uh'' sound to make her location known to the others, and males make a lower pitched version of the same call. The young vocalize a ''coo'' sound instead.

Female Gabon talapoins are able to give birth once they reach the age of four. Mating season takes place during dry seasons between June and August, and a specific mating call is vocalized by either the male or the female, or both. Social dominance rank of the males can influence their sexual behaviors. Females present themselves to the males when they are ready to mate, both sexes engage in grooming and hand contact for a short interval before proceeding with copulation if both parties are interested. Harassing calls are known to be vocalized by juveniles towards the copulating pair. All females tend to give birth annually during rainy season when copious foods are available, between the months of November and April. Outside breeding seasons, males tend to segregate from the females and move higher up into the trees.

Gabon talapoins display affections towards their young and members of the same troop, but female aggression towards the male is also a key trait of their social structure. Mothers take on the role of carrying their young and is known to reject advances by other females to carry their infants.

Gabon talapoins have been known to live up to 28 years in captivity, but not much is known on their lifespan in the wild. Their miniature nature makes them hard to track down, and have made research in their natural habitat a difficult task. Their bird-like vocalizations can often mislead research teams that are not familiar with the species as well.

== Conservation status ==
The Gabon talapoin is facing an overall decreasing population trend and was last assessed as Near Threatened on the IUCN Red List of Threatened Species in 2017. In its previous assessment in 2008, it had a stable population trend and was assessed as Least Concern with no significant threats.

Gabon talapoins were widespread and groups were often associated with villages in Gabon in the 1960s, but some groups have been disappearing. The decline in mature individuals have been attributed to increasing hunting activity. Owing to their small size and low meat yield, Gabon talapoins are difficult to catch and not typical hunting targets. However, the overhunting of larger animals has caused a shift in target and an increase in the hunting and trapping of smaller mammals like the Gabon talapoin. At least twenty-nine Gabon talapoins were impounded in Spain between 2002 and 2006. The monkeys were purchased from local hunters, smuggled into Europe, and have been offered by dealers in Belgium and the Czech Republic. Diet related diseases have been reported in captive talapoins.

Conservation sites across its range have been put in place to protect the land and water. On the level of legislation and trade control, the Gabon talapoin is listed (as the northern talapoin) under the Convention on International Trade of Endangered Species of Wild Fauna and Flora Appendix II, and as Class B under the African Convention.
