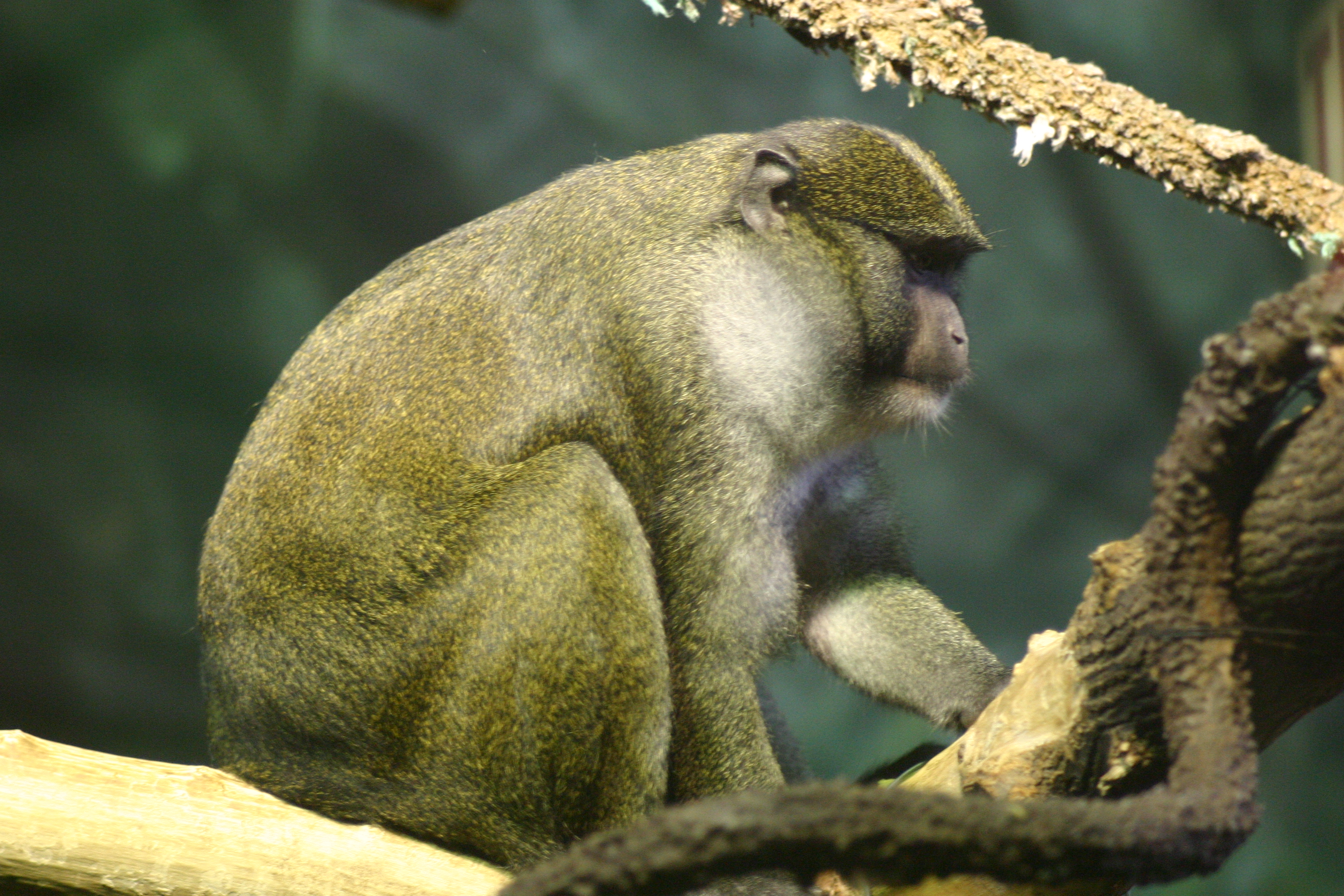
- At the Lincoln Park Zoo, Chicago

Conservation status
- Least Concern (IUCN 3.1)
- CITES Appendix II

Scientific classification
- Kingdom: Animalia
- Phylum: Chordata
- Class: Mammalia
- Order: Primates
- Family: Cercopithecidae
- Subfamily: Cercopithecinae
- Tribe: Cercopithecini
- Genus: Allenopithecus; Lang, 1923
- Species: A. nigroviridis

Binomial name
- Allenopithecus nigroviridis (Pocock, 1907)
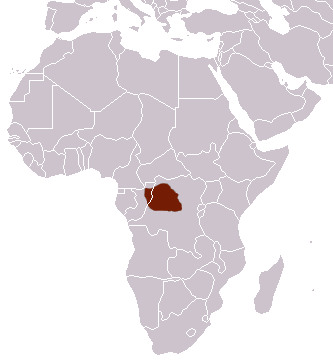
- Allen's swamp monkey range

Synonyms
- Cercopithecus nigroviridis Pocock, 1907; Lasiopyga nigriviridis Elliot, 1913

= Allen's swamp monkey =

Species of Old World monkey

Allen's swamp monkey (Allenopithecus nigroviridis) is a species of Old World monkey endemic to swamps and riparian forests in the central Congo Basin. As a medium-sized primate, adult individuals can have head-body lengths of up to 18 in (46 cm), with tails being slightly longer. It is identifiable by its coarse coat of green, brown, gray, and white fur. An arboreal omnivore, Allen's swamp monkey is typically found in trees adjacent to bodies of water, periodically descending to the ground to forage for a variety of invertebrates and plant matter in its riverine habitat. It is a diurnal, social animal that lives in groups of over 40 individuals. Although it was once considered to be a guenon, Allen's swamp monkey has been taxonomized as the only member of the monotypic genus Allenopithecus since the 1920s, which is now regarded as a sister clade of the guenons. Despite being a cercopithecin, Allen's swamp monkey exhibits a pastiche of traits typical of papionins, as it has many primitive features of the Cercopithecinae subfamily.

Allen's swamp monkey is classified as a least-concern species by the International Union for Conservation of Nature, and is projected to become threatened by poaching as road infrastructure expands near its habitats in relation to the logging industry in the Congo Basin.

== Taxonomic classification ==
Allen's swamp monkey is a basal member of Cercopithecini, as it was one of the first extant lineages to diverge from the tribe's ancestral stock. It is named after American zoologist Joel Asaph Allen. Other common names include the swamp guenon, the blackish-green guenon, and Allen's baboon-like monkey. Whether or not Allen's swamp monkey can be classified as a guenon depends whether the term "guenon" is applied to members of Cercopithecus or to members of Cercopithecini.

=== Changes in taxonomy ===
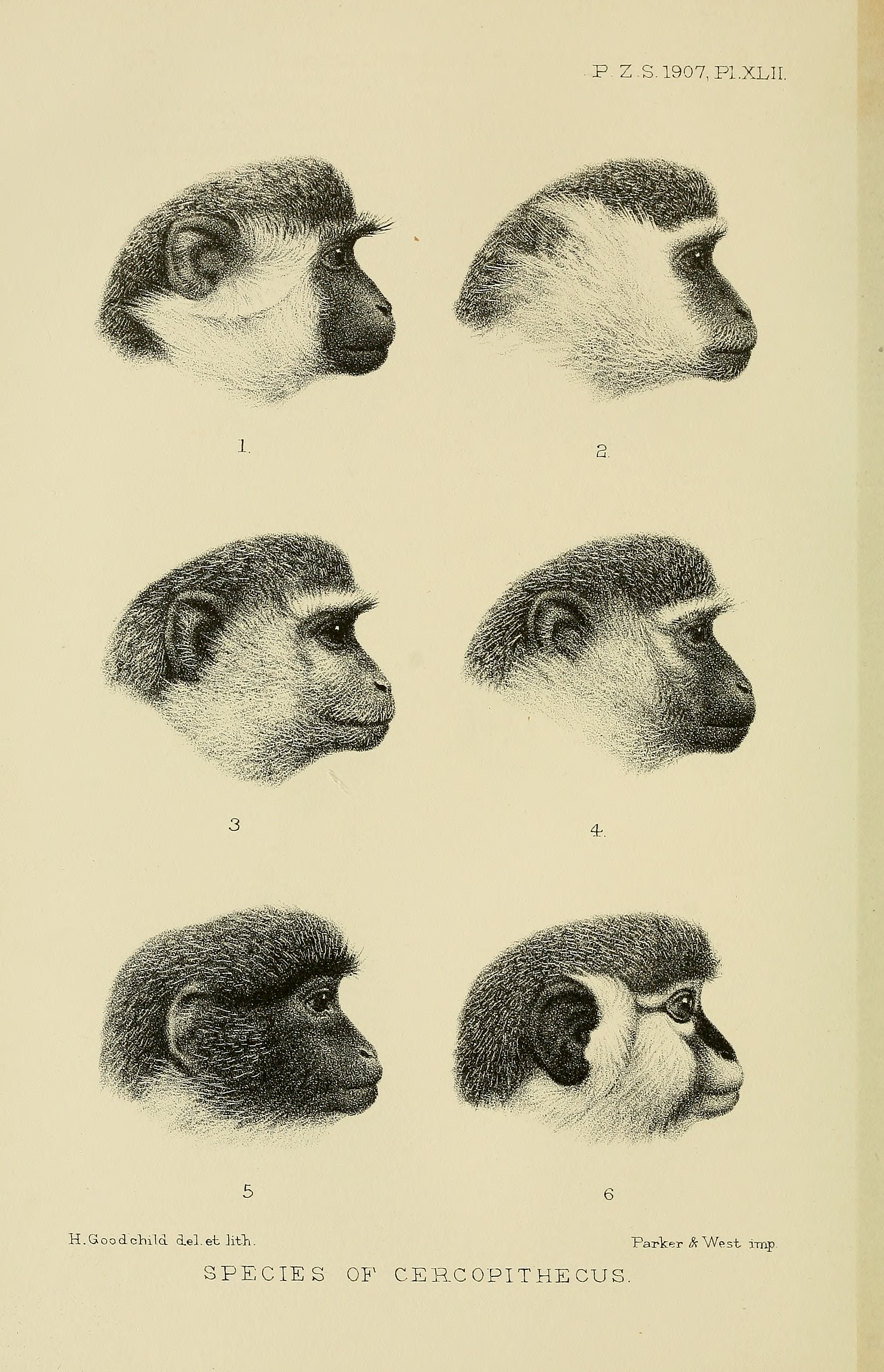
Allen's swamp monkey (bottom left) was initially described as a guenon of the genus Cercopithecus.

Allen's swamp monkey was first described by British zoologist Reginald Innes Pocock as Cercopithecus nigroviridis in a 1907 revision of Cercopithecus. He placed the species in his æthiops group while noting that further taxonomic refinement may have been necessary to emphasize the morphological differences between Allen's swamp monkey and other members of the group. This arrangement followed the precedent of English zoologist Philip Sclater's taxonomy, who organized Cercopithecus into species groups based on pelage alone, with æthiops corresponding to Sclater's green guenon group, chloronoti. The holotype used by Pocock is the skin of a subadult female from the upper Congo River that lived in the London Zoo between 1892 and 1894. Due to the immaturity of the holotype, Pocock erroneously described Allen's swamp monkey as being similar in size to talapoins. Daniel Giraud Elliot published a competing taxonomy in his 1913 Review of the Primates, with Allen's swamp monkey described as Lasiopyga nigriviridis [sic] based on the holotypic specimen. The American Museum of Natural History's acquisition of an adult male specimen that was shot on an island near Bolobo in 1909 allowed for Herbert Lang to move the species to a monophyletic genus, Allenopithecus, in 1923. This rearrangement would be omitted from subsequent reviews of African monkeys until German zoologist Ernst Schwarz published data acquired from live individuals at the Berlin Zoo in 1928.

In 1987, American scientists Elizabeth Strasser and Eric Delson proposed designating Allen's swamp monkey as a member of a monophyletic subtribe, Allenopithecina, to acknowledge its primitive characteristics within the context of cercopithecins. They identified the species' suite of papionine traits as symplesiomorphies resulting from its primitive status within Cercopithecinae. British-Australian biologist Colin Groves published an alternative taxonomy in 1989 that described Allen's swamp monkey as a papionin due to its morphological similarities to other members of the tribe. Groves revisited the species in 2000 and instead classified Allen's swamp monkey as a member of a sister taxon to Cercopithecini and Papionini, rather than being a member of one or the other. A Y-chromosome analysis published by Anthony Tosi et al. in 2002 responded to Groves' and Strasser's taxonomies, and agreed with the latter by taxonomizing Allen's swamp monkey as a cercopithecin with many primitive characters.

== Description ==
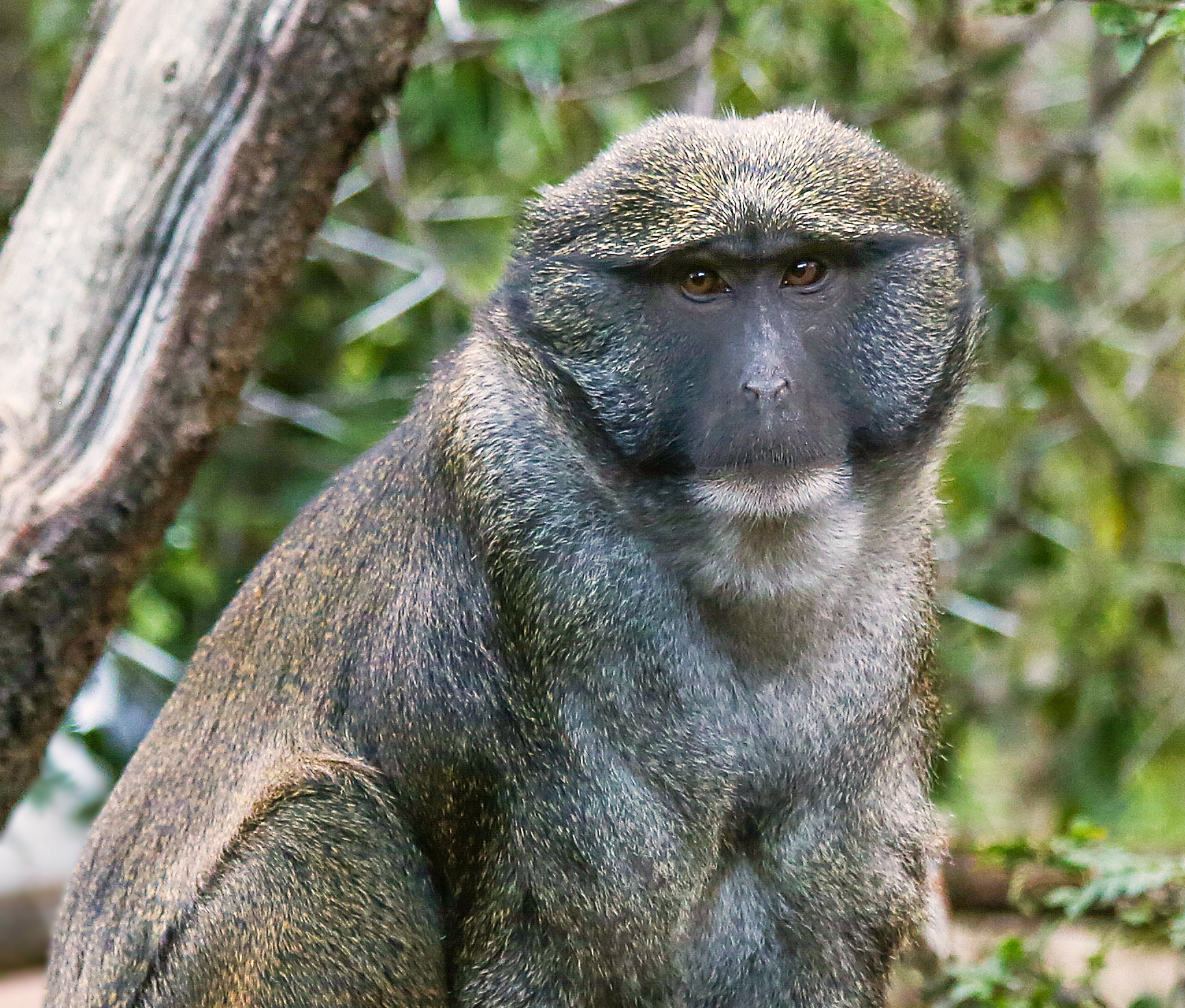
Adult pelage

Allen's swamp monkey has an overall guenon-like appearance, but also possesses traits reminiscent of papionins. It has a stocky, robust build, differing from the typically gracile bodies of other cercopithecins. The adult head-body length can be as long as 18 in (46 cm). The tail is only slightly longer than the head-body length, which is derived from a longer, ancestral form that is still exhibited by extant guenons. Males, weighing up to 6.0 kg (13.2 lb), are substantially larger than the females, which only weigh up to 3.7 kg (8.2 lb). The intermembral index is 84. The skeleton is generalized so as to facilitate both arboreal and terrestrial locomotion. With the exception of the free thumb, the fingers are webbed between the proximal phalanges, which may be an adaptation to a semiaquatic lifestyle. The quadrupedal standing posture resembles that of a baboon, with the thumb and index finger articulated independently from the other three digits.

Except for the pale cheeks, the facial skin is darkly pigmented. The ears are pointed, resembling those of a macaque rather than a cercopithecin. Adult females retain sparse black cilia as remnants of the long silky eyelashes of the fetal form, whereas in adult males such features are absent. The top of the braincase is flat, with the exception of an enlarged sagittal crest in males. The adult brain weighs 1/51 the body weight. The permanent dental formula is 2.1.2.32.1.2.3 × 2 = 32. The incisors, canines, and lower molars resemble those of guenons, notwithstanding an absent cusp in M_{3}, while the upper molars are robust and papioine. As a cercopithecine, Allen's swamp monkey possesses a pair of cheek pouches that it can access through slit-like openings near the molars. The snout is more prominent in males than in females. The cercopithecine air sac of the respiratory tract is large, such that it extends above the suprasternal notch subcutaneously. The female nipples are positioned close together, which allows an infant to suckle from both simultaneously. Unlike most other cercopithecins, female Allen's swamp monkeys exhibit sexual swelling during estrus. Ischial callosities are present in both sexes, and males exhibit individual variation in the shapes and sizes of their callosities. Unlike other cercopithecins, male Allen's swamp monkeys' ischial callosities are connected across the midline in some individuals, and are relatively square-shaped. Males have relatively large testes for cercopithecins, and the scrotum is pale blue.

The pelage is coarse and consists of gray, green, and yellow shades, with a lighter, grayish-brown agouti layer at the base of the hairs. The whiskers are gray with black tips and golden streaks, and are angled dorsally across the face. The neck, back, shoulders, and the top of the head have yellowish tinges, while the chin, neck, chest, abdomen, and inner limbs are pale. The tail is darker than the rest of the coat, especially near the tip, and is yellow at the base and on the underside. The fur is longer around the neck and along the shoulders than it is elsewhere on the body. The newborn pelage resembles that of the adult, although the yellow hues are more pronounced, and a crown consisting of silky white hairs is present. The natal coat is fully replaced by 10 weeks of age.

== Behavior ==
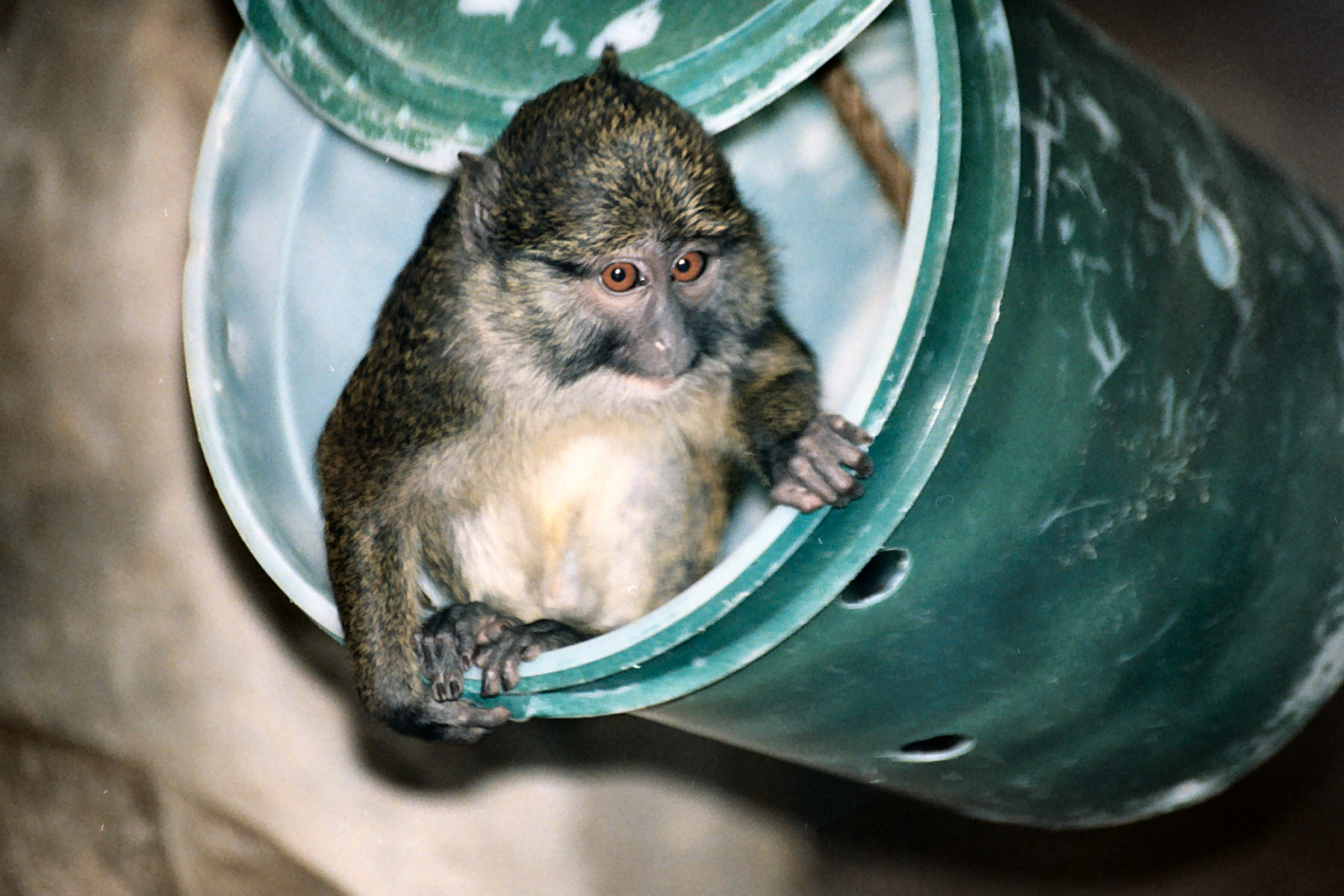
Immature individual in the Cleveland Metroparks Zoo in Cleveland, Ohio

Allen's swamp monkey is a diurnal primate that lives in multimale-multifemale groups of over 40 individuals. Allogrooming is practiced to reinforce social bonds between individuals. Gestures and vocalizations facilitate communication, with chirps being used as warning calls. The number of males in a group depends on the number of females, such that smaller groups are likely to contain only one adult male. Despite this demographic pattern, males are not known to live solitarily, indicating that external factors may influence the relationship between group size and adult male presence. The sizes and sexual compositions of groups imitate those of papionins; however, the rarity with which members of opposite sexes interact is a guenon trait. This idiosyncratic social organization could be a result of Allen's swamp monkey's basal position within Cercopithecini.

Allen's swamp monkey is typically arboreal, although it descends to the ground to forage for food. Its diet is unusual among primates, as it not only consumes fruits, seeds, leaves, nectar, and flowers, but also small invertebrates such as shrimp, fish, snails, and worms. The digestive retention time is approximately 23–24 hours, which follows the cercopithecine pattern of having longer retention times than what would be expected for the animal's body size. Allen's swamp monkey has been used to identify this trait as ancestral among cercopithecines due to the phylogenetic primitiveness of the species.

There is no breeding season, as births occur year-round. Gestation periods are five to six months in duration. Offspring are typically singletons, although twinning has been observed. Females are the primary caregivers of infants and juveniles. The first separation between a mother and her offspring happens at about two weeks after birth. Solid food is first consumed at about 33 days of age, with weaning occurring at two and a half months. Observations of a captive population indicate that the infant is responsible to distancing itself from its mother, rather than the mother rejecting her infant during the weaning period. Additionally, the mother is more lenient regarding her proximity with her infant than comparable mothers are in arboreal Cercopithecus species. This may be a result of the semi-terrestrial habit of Allen's swamp monkey, as falling from trees is a less imminent danger to the survival of offspring, thereby reducing the need for stringent maternal oversight. The average lifespan of an Allen's swamp monkey is 28 years.

== Distribution ==
Allen's swamp monkey lives in the Congo Basin between 16°E and 24°E, and between 4°N and possibly 6° S. Its range includes the Republic of the Congo, the Democratic Republic of the Congo, and possibly Cameroon and Angola, with one documented observation in the Central African Republic. Prior to the 1990s, its range was believed to be limited to the swamps and riparian forests adjacent to the lower Likouala-aux-Herbes, Oubangui, and Sangha rivers. A discontinuous population was confirmed in the upper Sangha in 2006, about 100 km (62 mi) northwest of its previously recognized range. It was recorded north of Bayanga in the Central African Republic in 2016. Because of its riparian habit, rivers are less likely to be geographic barriers that affect the species' range than they are for sympatric primates.

== Conservation status ==
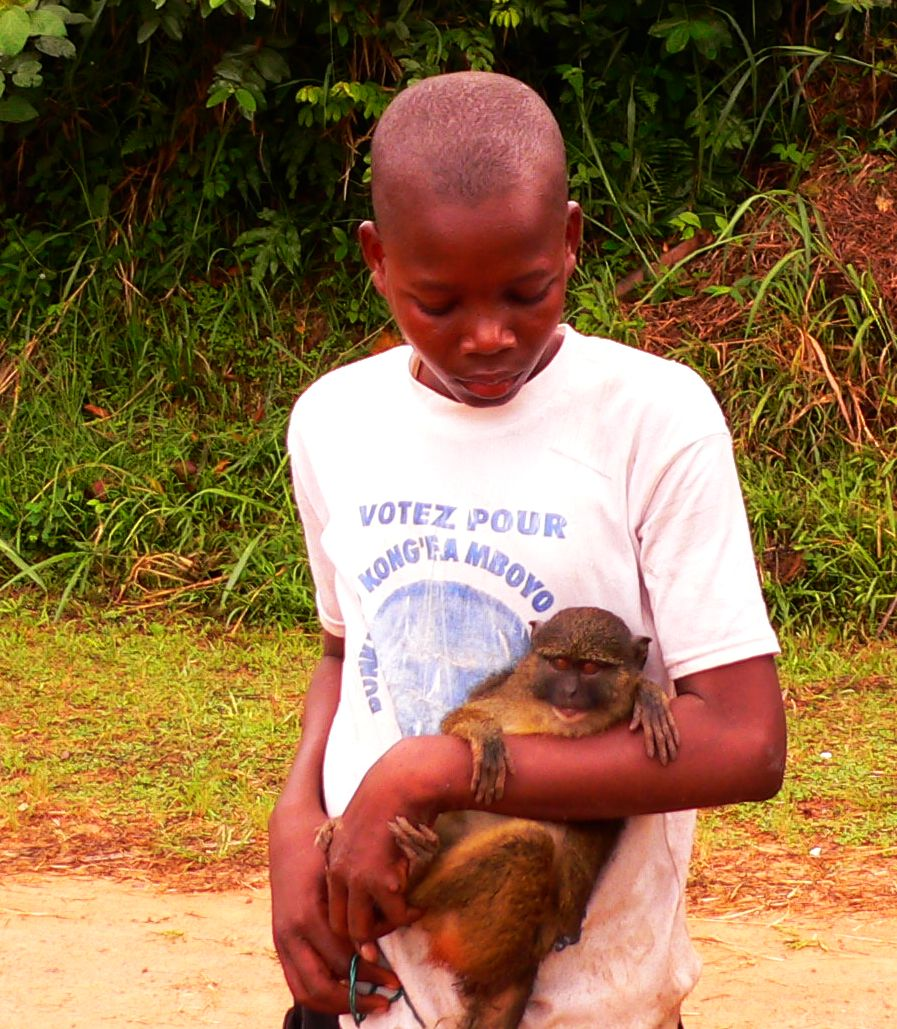
Allen's swamp monkeys appear in the exotic pet trade.

Allen's swamp monkey is classified as a least-concern species by the International Union for Conservation of Nature, and is listed in CITES Appendix II. The species is expected to be threatened by unsustainable poaching for bushmeat for both subsistence consumption and commercial sale. Unregulated hunting will likely increase due to expanding networks of roads adjacent to the species' habitats, making populations more accessible to poachers. These road expansion projects are a consequence of intensifying logging in the Congo Basin. In addition to poaching, Allen's swamp monkeys may be captured for the exotic pet trade.
