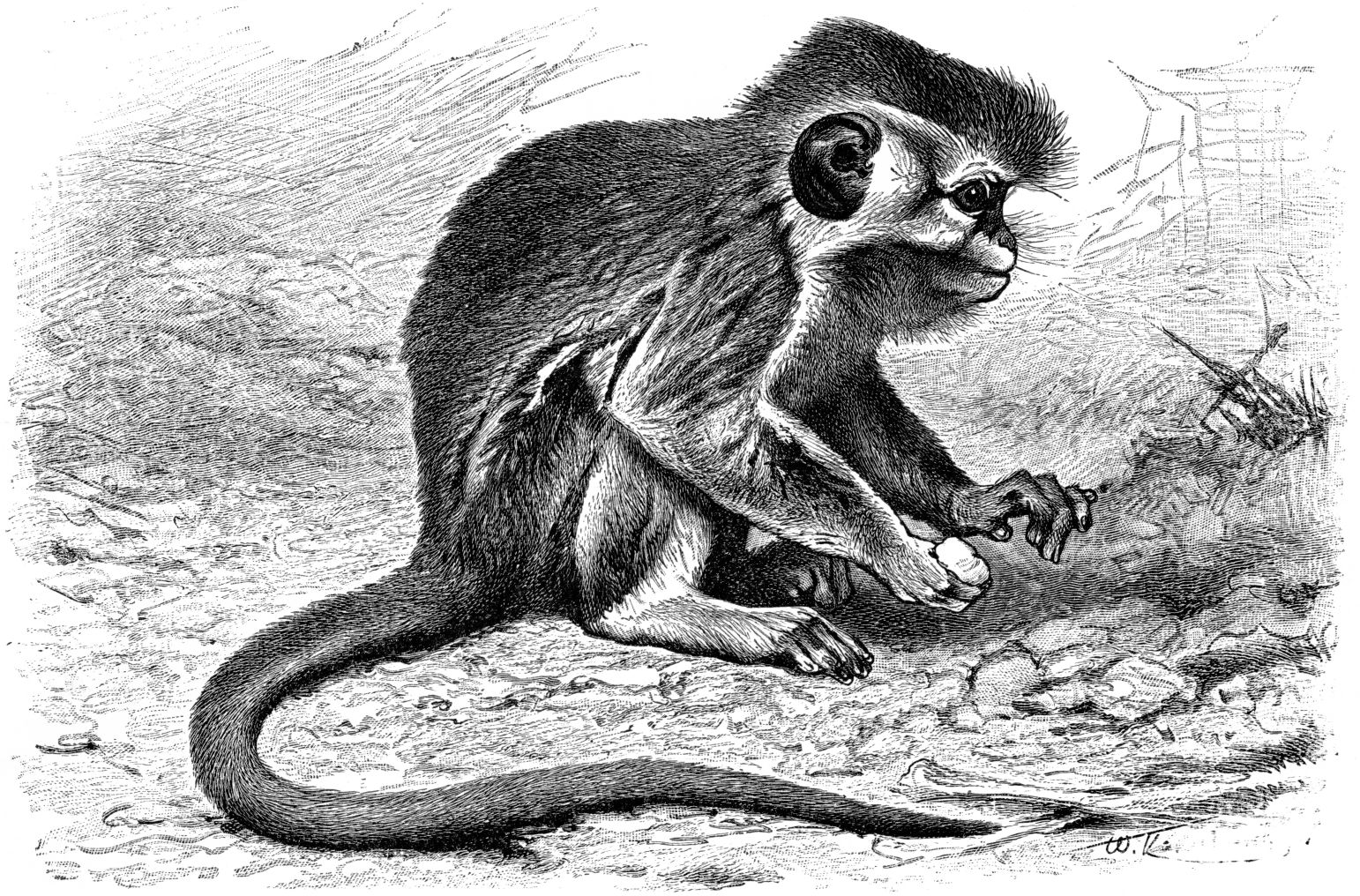

Scientific classification
- Kingdom: Animalia
- Phylum: Chordata
- Class: Mammalia
- Order: Primates
- Family: Cercopithecidae
- Subfamily: Cercopithecinae
- Tribe: Cercopithecini
- Genus: Miopithecus; I. Geoffroy Saint-Hilaire, 1842

Type species
- Simia talapoin Schreber, 1774

Species
- Miopithecus talapoin Miopithecus ogouensis
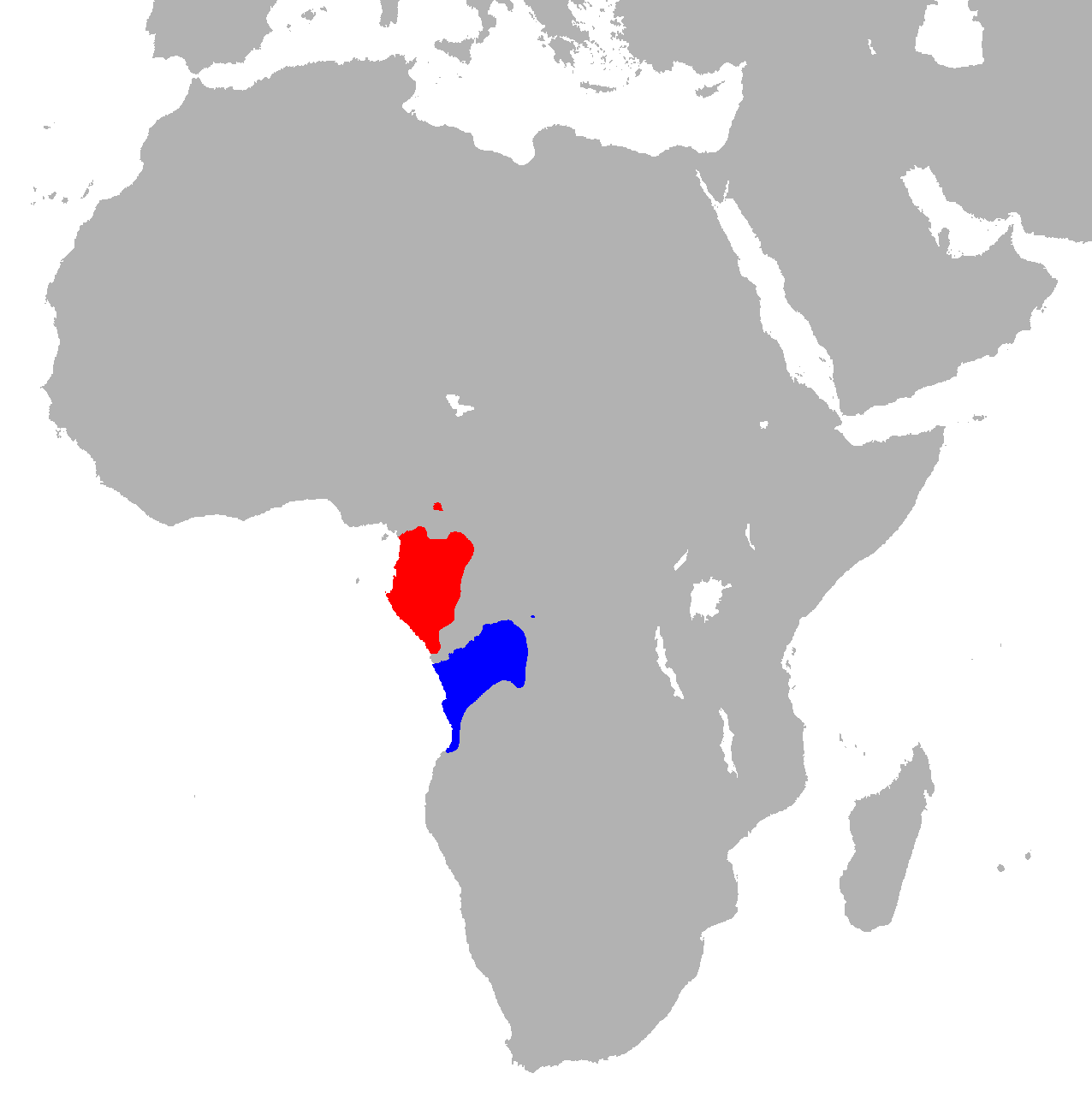
- Distribution of: Red: Miopithecus ogouensis; Blue: Miopithecus talapoin

= Talapoin =

Talapoins

Genus of Old World monkeys

Talapoins (/ˈtæləpɔɪnz/) are the two species of Old World monkeys classified in genus Miopithecus. They live in central Africa, with their range extending from Cameroon and the Democratic Republic of the Congo to Angola.

With a typical length of 32 to 45 centimetres (1 ft 1 in to 1 ft 6 in) and a weight of approximately 1.3 kilograms or 2.9 pounds (males) and 0.8 kilograms or 1.8 pounds (females), talapoins are the smallest Old World monkeys. Their fur is grey green on top and whitish on their underside, much like the vervet monkeys. The head is round and short-snouted with a hairless face.

Talapoins are diurnal and arboreal, preferring rain forest or mangroves near water. They are usually not found in open fields, nor do they seem to be disrupted by humans. Like Allen's swamp monkey, they can swim well and look in the water for food.

These monkeys live in groups of 60 to 100 individuals. They congregate at night in trees close to the water, dividing into smaller subgroups during the day to spread out to find food. Groups are composed of several fully mature males, numerous females and their offspring. Unlike the closely related guenons, they do not have any territorial behaviors. Their vocal repertoire is smaller, as well.

Talapoins are omnivores; their diet consists mainly of fruits, seeds, aquatic plants, insects, shellfish, bird eggs and small vertebrates.

Their 160-day gestation period (typically from November to March) results in the birth of a single young. Offspring are large, well developed — newborns weigh over 200 grams or 0.44 pounds or 7.1 ounces, which is about a quarter of the weight of the mother — and develop rapidly. Within six weeks, they eat solid food, and at three months of age, they are independent. The greatest recorded age of a talapoin in captivity was 28 years, while the life expectancy in the wild is not well known.

== Species ==
Genus Miopithecus – Geoffroy, 1842 – two species
Common name	Scientific name and subspecies	Range	Size and ecology	IUCN status and estimated population
Angolan talapoin	M. talapoin (Schreber, 1774)	Central Africa	Size: 32–45 cm (13–18 in) long, plus 36–53 cm (14–21 in) tail Habitat: Forest and inland wetlands Diet: Insects, leaves, seeds, fruit, water plants, grubs, eggs, and small vertebrates	VU Unknown
Gabon talapoin	M. ogouensis Kingdon, 1997	Central Africa	Size: 23–36 cm (9–14 in) long, plus 31–45 cm (12–18 in) tail Habitat: Forest Diet: Fruit, seeds and insects	NT Unknown

== Etymology ==
Talapoin is a 16th-century French word for a Buddhist monk, from Portuguese talapão, from Mon tala pōi "our lord"; originally jocular, from the appearance of the monkey.

== Sources ==
- Kingdon, Jonathan (2015). The Kingdon Field Guide to African Mammals (Second ed.). Bloomsbury Publishing. ISBN 978-1-4729-2531-2.
