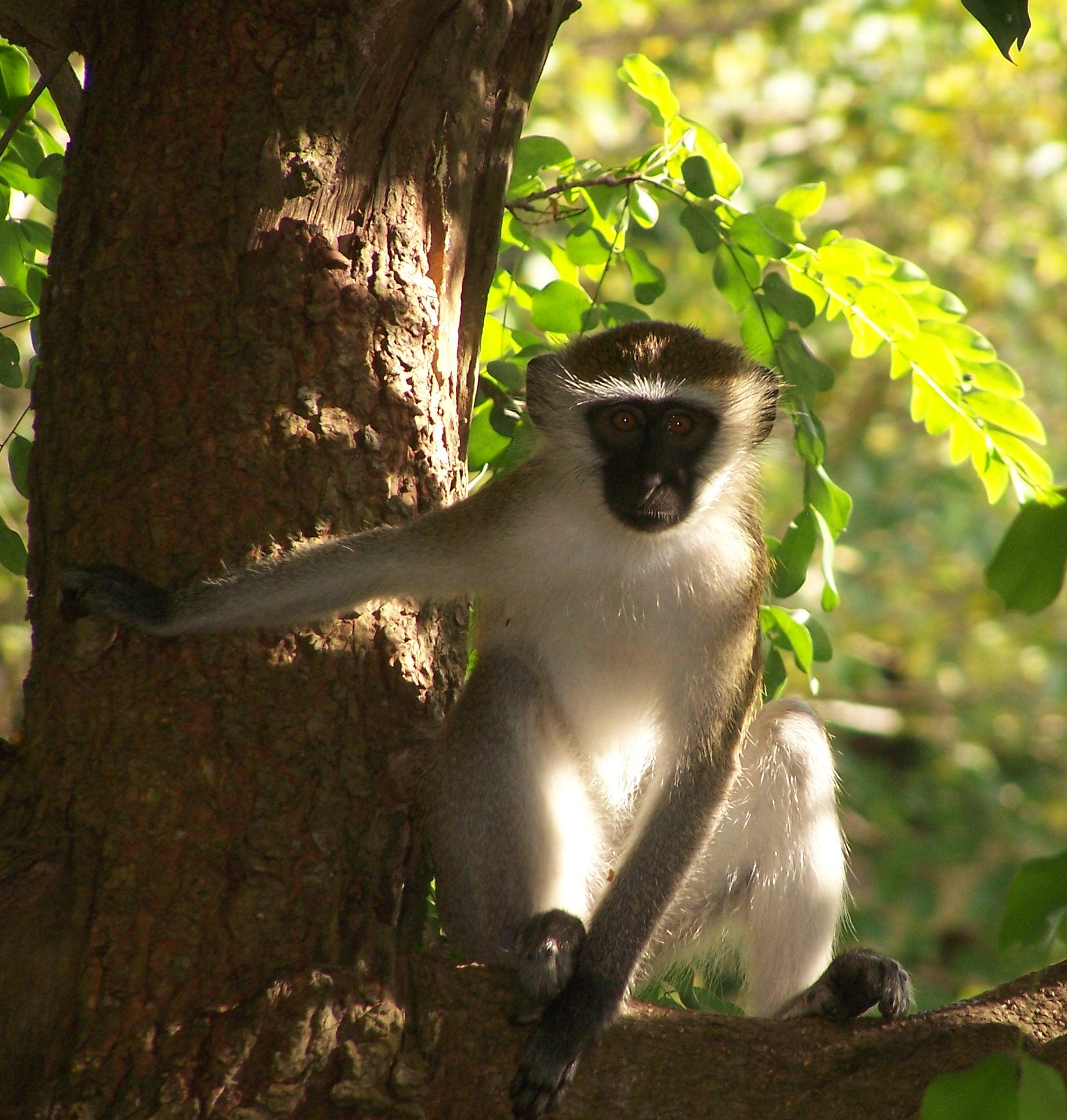
- Vervet monkey (Chlorocebus pygerythrus)

Scientific classification
- Kingdom: Animalia
- Phylum: Chordata
- Class: Mammalia
- Order: Primates
- Suborder: Haplorhini
- Infraorder: Simiiformes
- Family: Cercopithecidae
- Subfamily: Cercopithecinae
- Tribe: Cercopithecini; Gray, 1821

Type genus
- Cercopithecus Linnaeus, 1758

Genera
- See text

= Cercopithecini =

Tribe of Old World monkeys

Cercopithecini is a tribe of Old World monkey that includes several monkey species, including the vervet monkeys, talapoins, Allen's swamp monkeys and the guenons, all in Africa.

== Classification ==
- Family Cercopithecidae
  - Subfamily Cercopithecinae
    - Tribe Cercopithecini
      - Genus Allenopithecus - Allen's swamp monkey
      - Genus Miopithecus - talapoins
      - Genus Erythrocebus – patas monkeys
      - Genus Chlorocebus – vervet monkeys, etc.
      - Genus Allochrocebus – terrestrial guenons
      - Genus Cercopithecus – guenons
