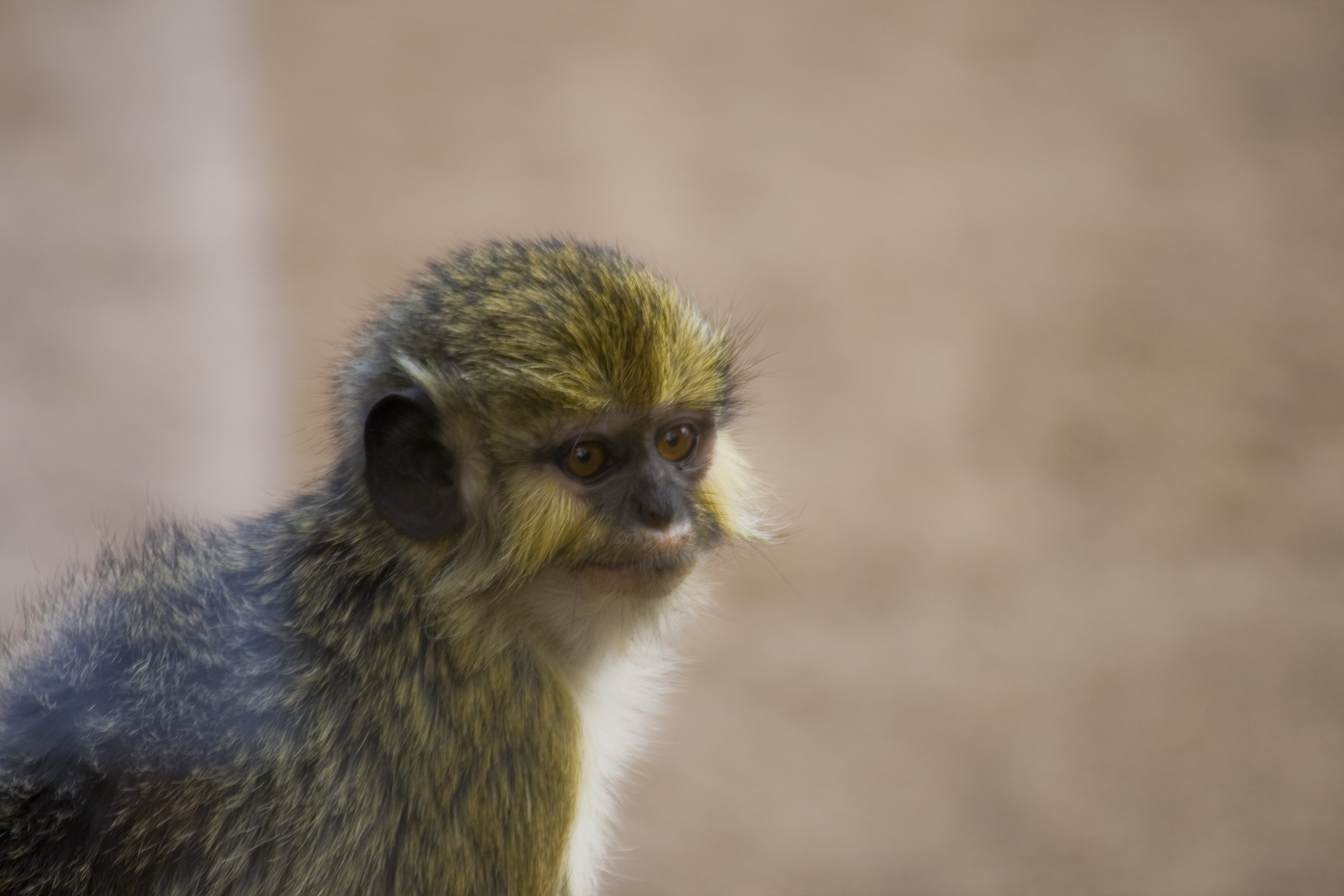

Conservation status
- Vulnerable (IUCN 3.1)

Scientific classification
- Kingdom: Animalia
- Phylum: Chordata
- Class: Mammalia
- Infraclass: Placentalia
- Order: Primates
- Family: Cercopithecidae
- Genus: Miopithecus
- Species: M. talapoin

Binomial name
- Miopithecus talapoin (Schreber, 1774)
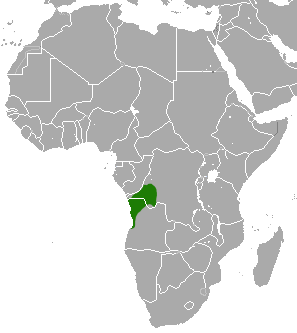
- Angolan talapoin range

= Angolan talapoin =

Species of Old World monkey

The Angolan talapoin (Miopithecus talapoin), also known as the southern talapoin, is a species of primate in the family Cercopithecidae. Angolan talapoins are the smallest species of Old World monkeys.

== Description ==
The fur of the Angolan talapoin is coarsely banded yellow-and-black on the back and flanks and white or greyish white on the chest and belly. The head is round and short-snouted with a hairless face which has a black nose skin bordering the face. The scrotum is coloured pink medially and blue laterally. They show mild sexual dimorphism in body size, the average head and body length is 40 centimetres (16 in), the average tail length is 52.5 centimetres (20.7 in) and the average weight is 1,380 grams (49 oz) for males and 1,120 grams (40 oz) for females.

== Habitat ==
The Angolan talapoin is limited to dense evergreen vegetation on the banks of rivers that often flow through miombo (Brachystegia) woodland or, as that is cleared, areas under cultivation.

== Distribution ==
The Angolan talapoin occurs in the coastal watersheds south of the Congo River, including the Mebridege River, Loge River, Cuanza River, Nhia River and Cuvo River, they also extend into the upper reaches of the Cuango River. This species is found on the coast of Angola, south to about 13'S, and the Democratic Republic of the Congo as far as the Cuango River and on both sides of the Kasai River.

== Biology ==
The Angolan talapoin is both diurnal and mainly arboreal, they occasionally descend to the ground while foraging. They are proficient swimmers and a common defensive strategy is to sleep on branches overhanging rivers so that they can dive into the water to escape from danger.

The social organisation of the Angola talapoin is that they live in quite large groups of 60 to 100 animals. At night the group is gathered together in trees close to the water, splitting up into smaller sub-groups in the morning so that they can spread out to forage. Each group normally consists of several fully mature males, many females and their offspring. Angolan talapoins do not show any territoriality, which is unlike their close relatives the guenons. They seem to enjoy play and this mostly takes place between juveniles; however, the males tend to engage in social play more often than female.

The home ranges of the Angola talapoin are likely to be larger, and the population densities lower, than is the case with Gabon talapoin because forest strips are narrower and resources scarcer. The fluctuations in climate since the last glaciation have probably reinforced this species' primary adaptation to 'strip living' as longer dry seasons and less extensive flooding under the generally cooler and drier climate that now dominates outside the rainforest seems to have favoured more terrestrial habits than are apparent in the Gabon talapoin. It mainly feeds on fruits, but also on seeds, young foliage, and invertebrates.
