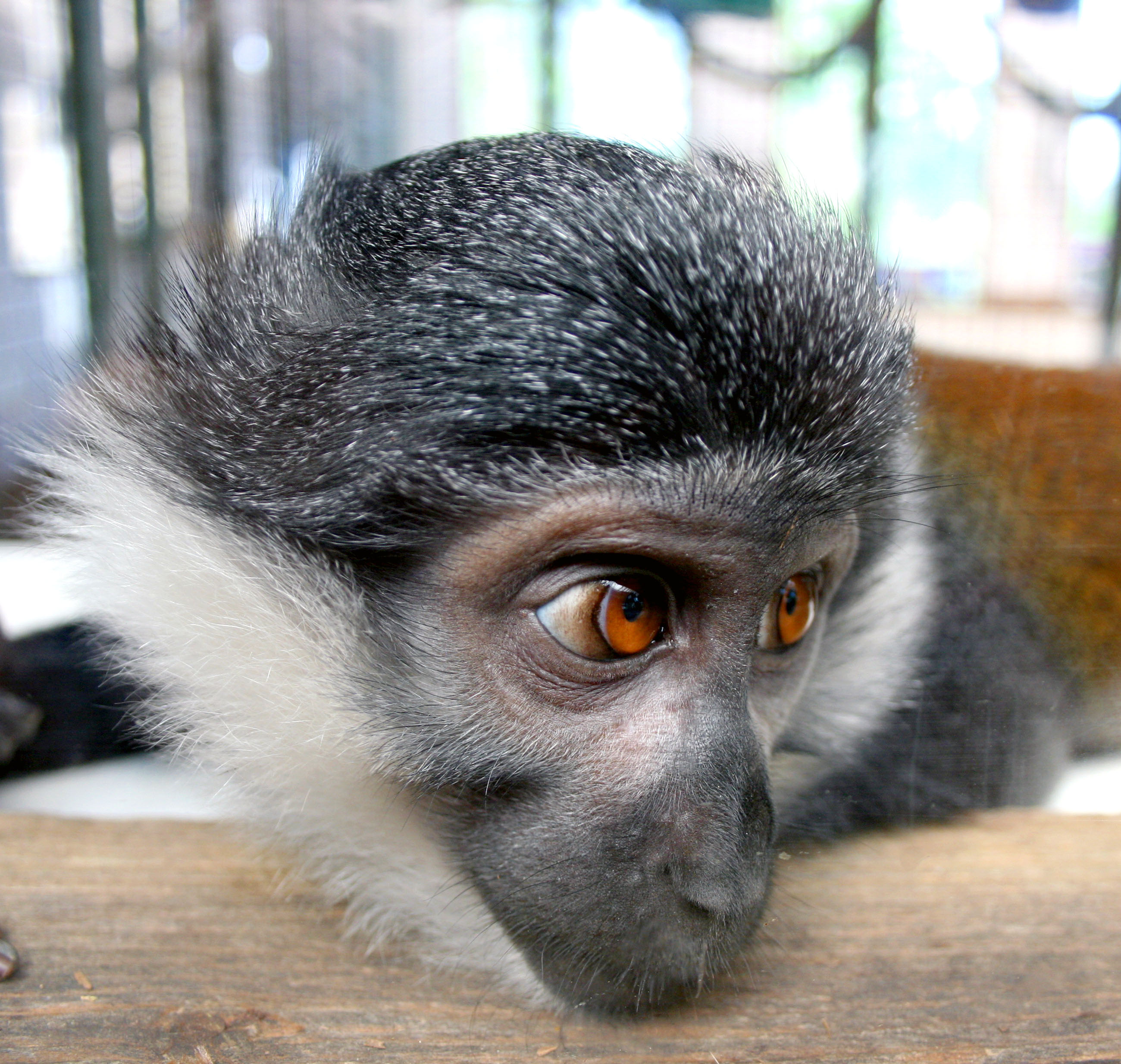
- L'Hoest's monkey

Scientific classification
- Kingdom: Animalia
- Phylum: Chordata
- Class: Mammalia
- Infraclass: Placentalia
- Order: Primates
- Family: Cercopithecidae
- Tribe: Cercopithecini
- Genus: Allochrocebus; Elliot, 1913

Type species
- Cercopithecus lhoesti Sclater, 1899

Species and subspecies
- Allochrocebus lhoesti (Sclater, 1899); Allochrocebus preussi (Matschie, 1898); Allochrocebus preussi insularis (Thomas, 1910); Allochrocebus preussi preussi (Matschie, 1898); Allochrocebus solatus (Harrison, 1988)
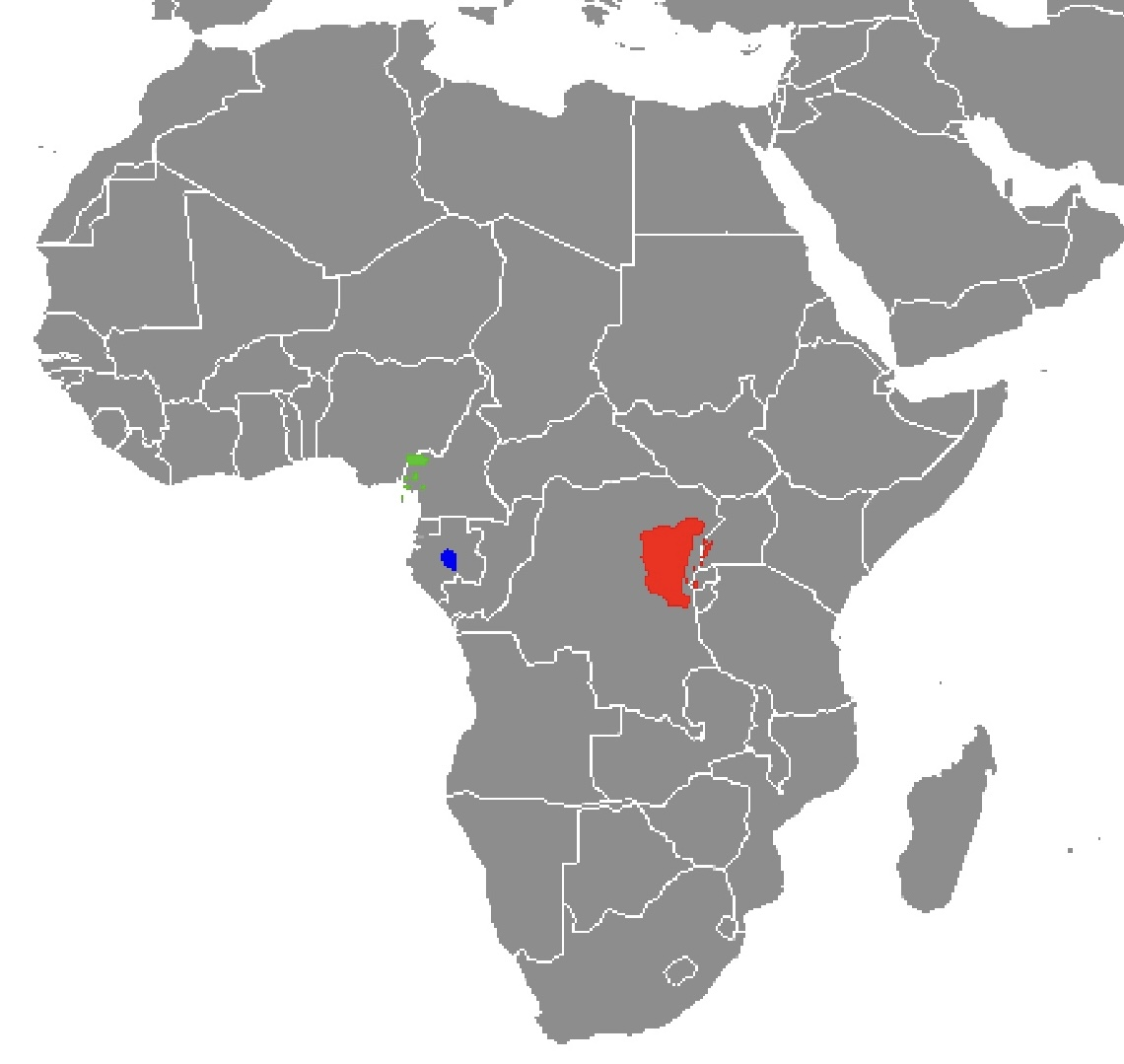
- Distribution map, displaying: Red: Allochrocebus lhoesti; Green: Allochrocebus preussi; Blue: Allochrocebus solatus

= Allochrocebus =

Genus of Old World monkeys

Allochrocebus is a primate genus including the terrestrial guenons: the L'Hoest's monkey, the Preuss's monkey, and the sun-tailed monkey.

== Taxonomy & systematics ==
Formerly included in genus Cercopithecus, the three species of terrestrial guenons are now included in genus Allochrocebus.

Genus Allochrocebus – Elliot, 1913 – three species
Common name	Scientific name and subspecies	Range	Size and ecology	IUCN status and estimated population
L'Hoest's monkey	A. lhoesti (P. L. Sclater, 1899)	Central Africa	Size: 31–69 cm (12–27 in) long, plus 48–10 cm (19–4 in) tail Habitat: Forest Diet: Fruit, leaves, mushrooms, and invertebrates	VU Unknown
Preuss's monkey	A. preussi (Matschie, 1898) Two subspecies: A. p. insularis (Bioko Preuss's monkey); A. p. preussi (Cameroon Preuss's monkey)	West-central Africa	Size: 45–61 cm (18–24 in) long, plus 49–69 cm (19–27 in) tail Habitat: Forest and grassland Diet: Fruit, seeds, shoots, leaves, buds, flowers, and mushrooms	EN Unknown
Sun-tailed monkey	A. solatus (M. J. S. Harrison, 1988)	West-central Africa	Size: 45–58 cm (18–23 in) long, plus 56–76 cm (22–30 in) tail Habitat: Forest Diet: Fruit, seeds, and invertebrates	NT Unknown

== Sources ==
- Kingdon, Jonathan (2015). The Kingdon Field Guide to African Mammals (Second ed.). Bloomsbury Publishing. ISBN 978-1-4729-2531-2.
