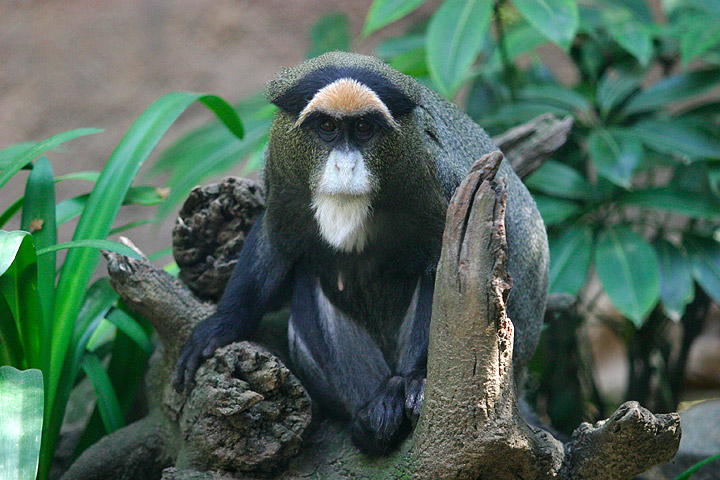
- De Brazza's monkey (Cercopithecus neglectus)

Scientific classification
- Kingdom: Animalia
- Phylum: Chordata
- Class: Mammalia
- Order: Primates
- Parvorder: Catarrhini
- Superfamily: Cercopithecoidea; Gray, 1821
- Family: Cercopithecidae; Gray, 1821

Type genus
- Cercopithecus Linnaeus, 1758

Subfamilies
- Cercopithecinae – 13 genera; Colobinae – 10 genera
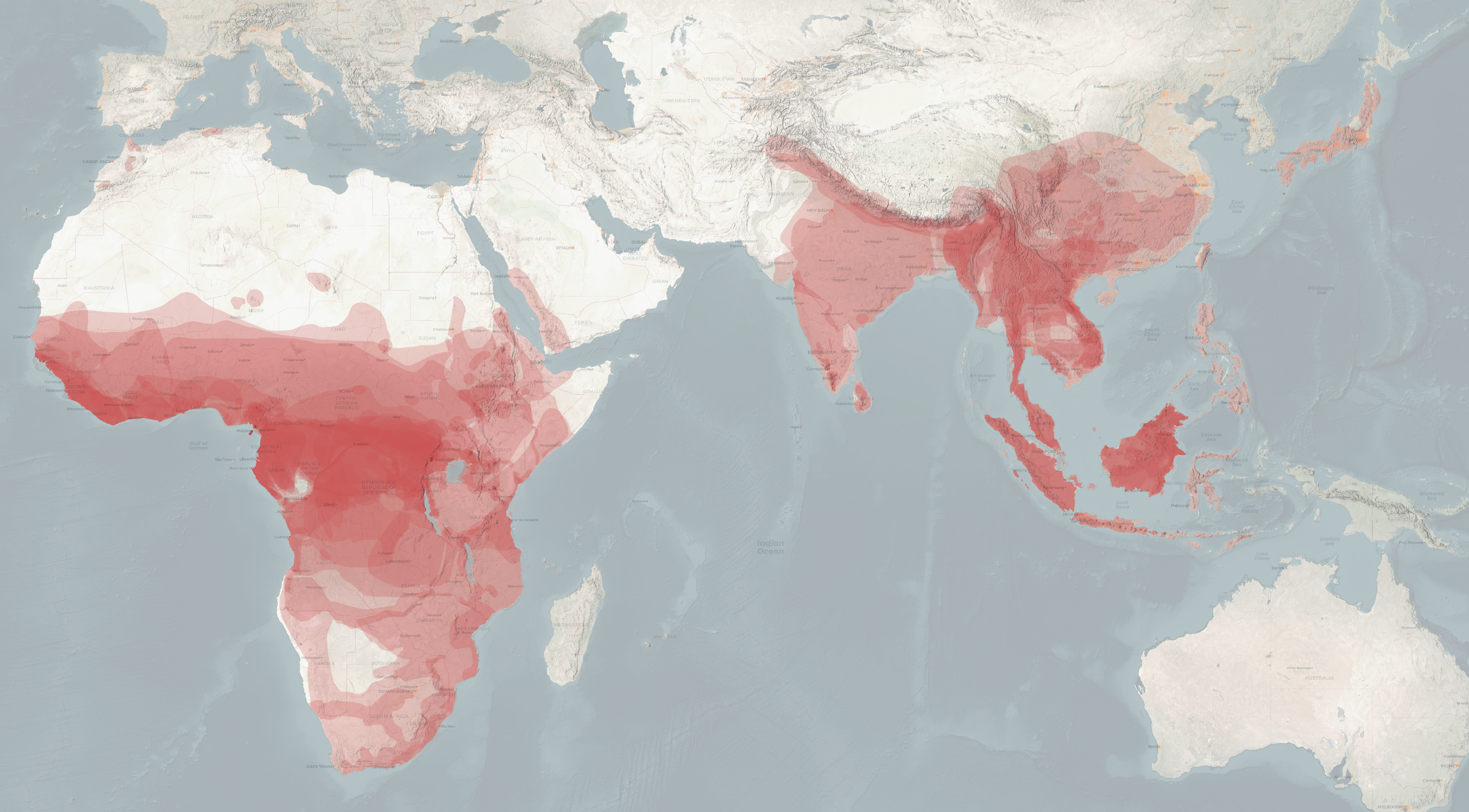
- The distribution and density of Old World monkey species

= Old World monkey =

Old World monkeys Temporal range: Oligocene–Recent

Family of mammals

Old World monkeys are primates in the family Cercopithecidae (/ˌsɜːrkoʊpɪˈθɛsɪdiː/). Twenty-four genera and 139 species are recognized, making it the largest primate family. Old World monkey genera include baboons (genus Papio), red colobus (genus Piliocolobus), and macaques (genus Macaca). Common names for other Old World monkeys include the talapoin, guenon, colobus, douc (douc langur, genus Pygathrix), vervet, gelada, mangabey (a group of genera), langur, mandrill, drill, surili (Presbytis), patas, and proboscis monkey.

Phylogenetically, they are more closely related to apes than to New World monkeys, with the Old World monkeys and apes diverging from a common ancestor between 25 million and 30 million years ago. This clade, containing the Old World monkeys and the apes, diverged from a common ancestor with the New World monkeys around 45 to 55 million years ago. The individual species of Old World monkey are more closely related to each other than to apes or any other grouping, with a common ancestor around 14 million years ago.

The smallest Old World monkey is the Angolan talapoin, with a head and body 34–37 centimetres (13–15 in) in length, and weighing between 0.7 and 1.3 kilograms (1.5 and 2.9 lb). The largest is the male mandrill, around 70 centimetres (28 in) in length, and weighing up to 50 kilograms (110 lb) Old World monkeys have a variety of facial features; some have snouts, some are flat-nosed, and many exhibit coloration. Most have tails, but they are not prehensile.

Old World monkeys are native to Africa and Asia today, inhabiting numerous environments: tropical rain forests, savannas, shrublands, and mountainous terrain. They inhabited much of Europe in the past.

Some Old World monkeys are arboreal, such as the colobus monkeys; others are terrestrial, such as the baboons. Most are at least partially omnivorous, but all prefer plant matter, which forms the bulk of their diets. Most are highly opportunistic, primarily eating fruit, but also consuming almost any food item available, such as flowers, leaves, bulbs and rhizomes, insects, snails, small mammals, and garbage and handouts from humans.

== Taxonomic classification and phylogeny ==
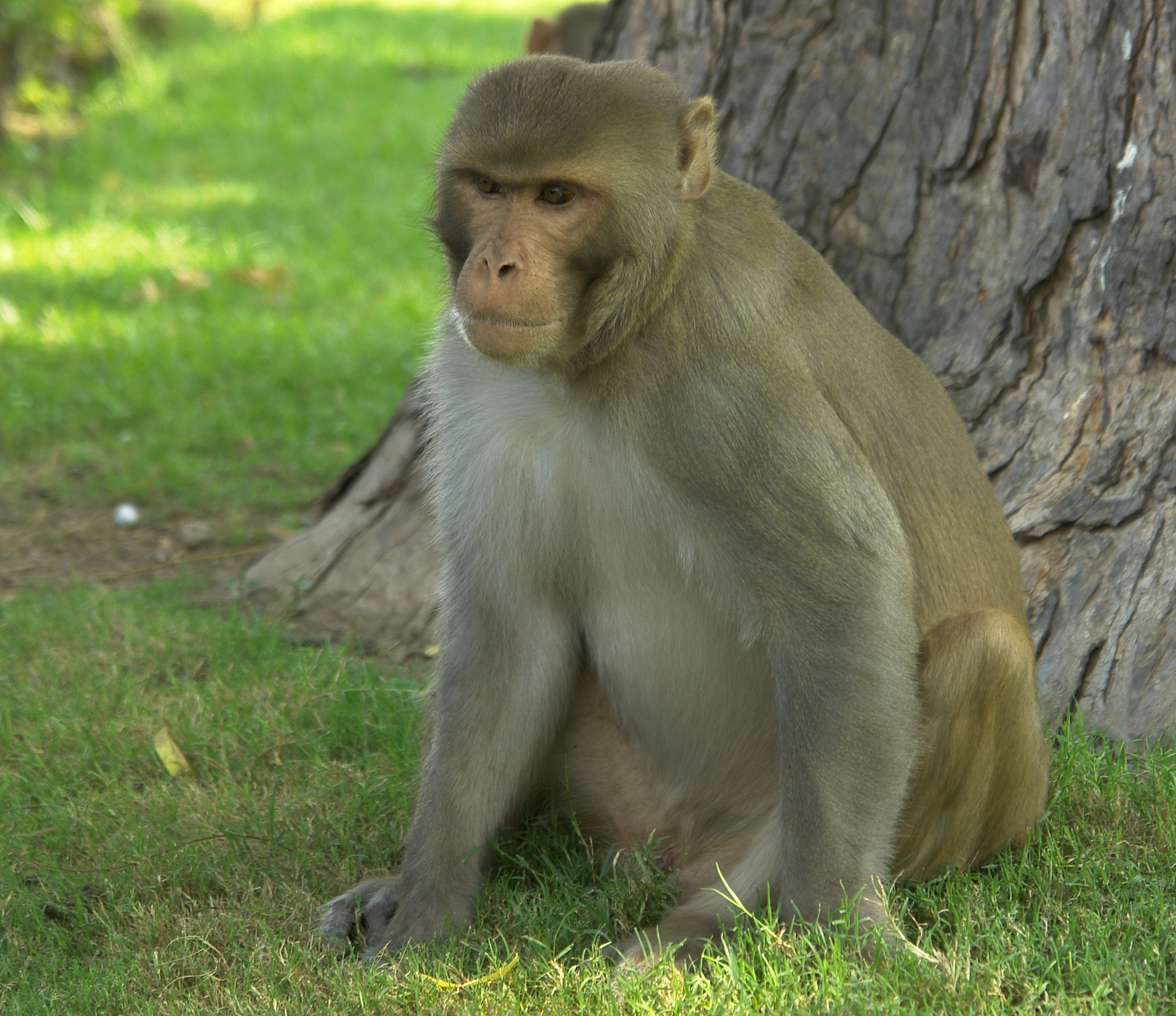
A male rhesus macaque (Macaca mulatta)

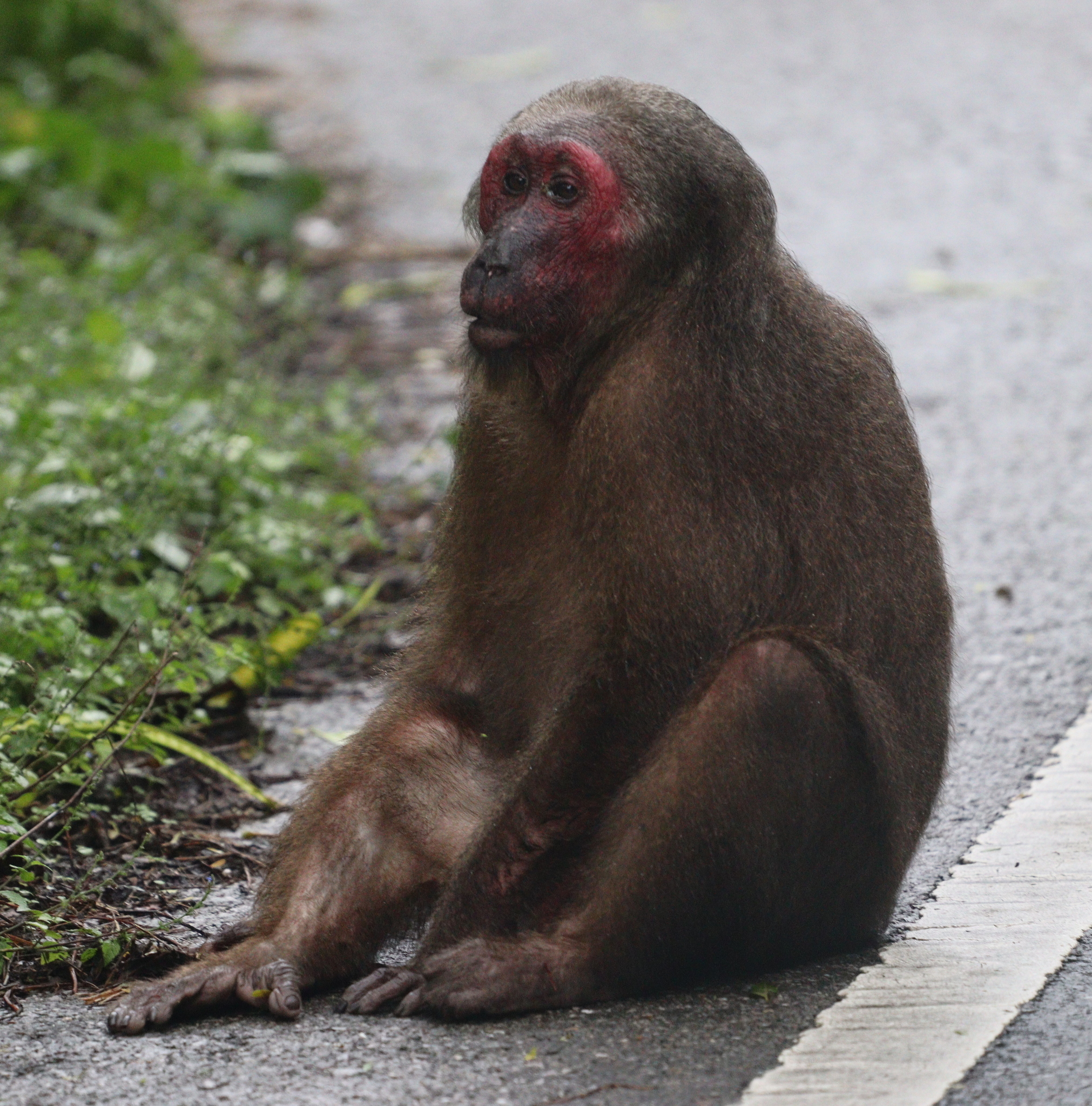
Stump-tailed macaque, (Macaca Arctoides)

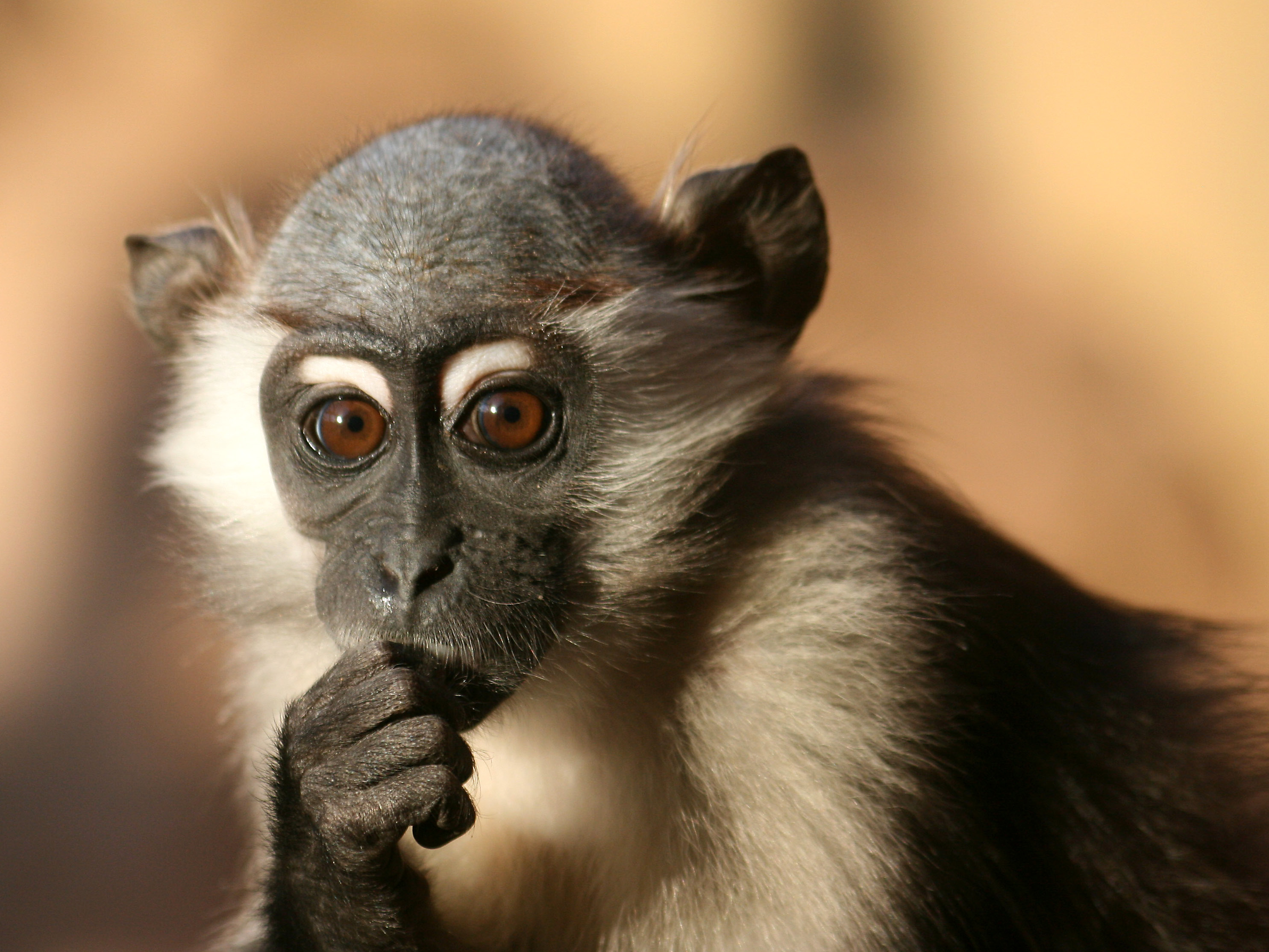
Young collared mangabey (Cercocebus torquatus).

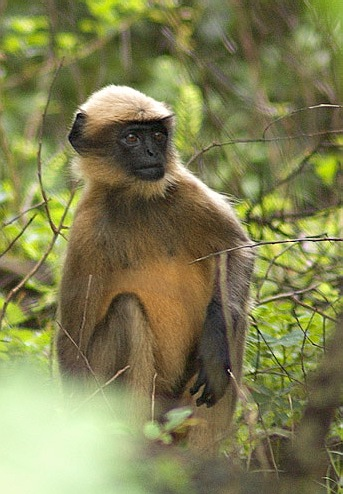
Black-footed gray langur, (Semnopithecus hypoleucos)

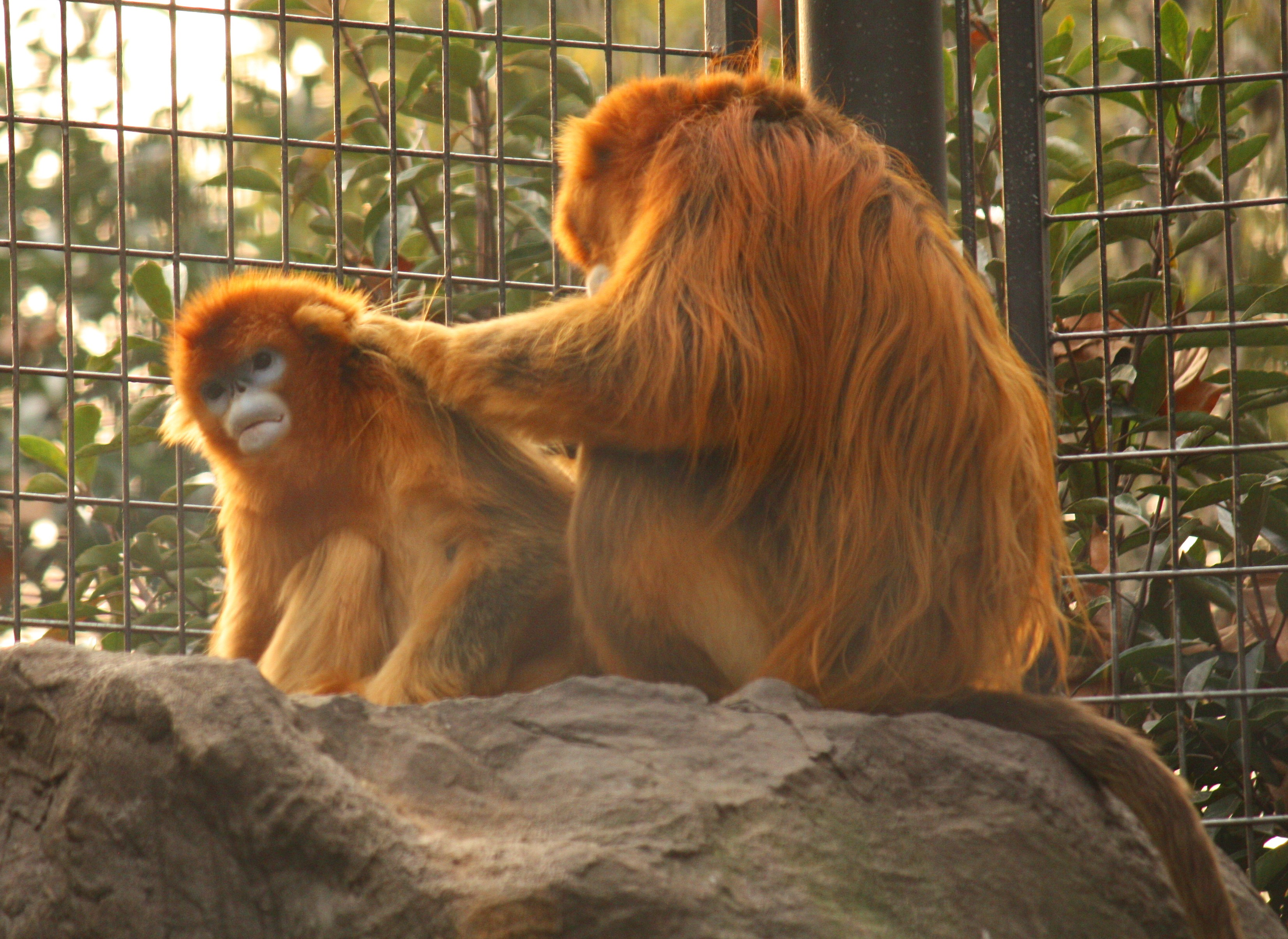
Golden snub-nosed monkey, (Rhinopithecus roxellana)

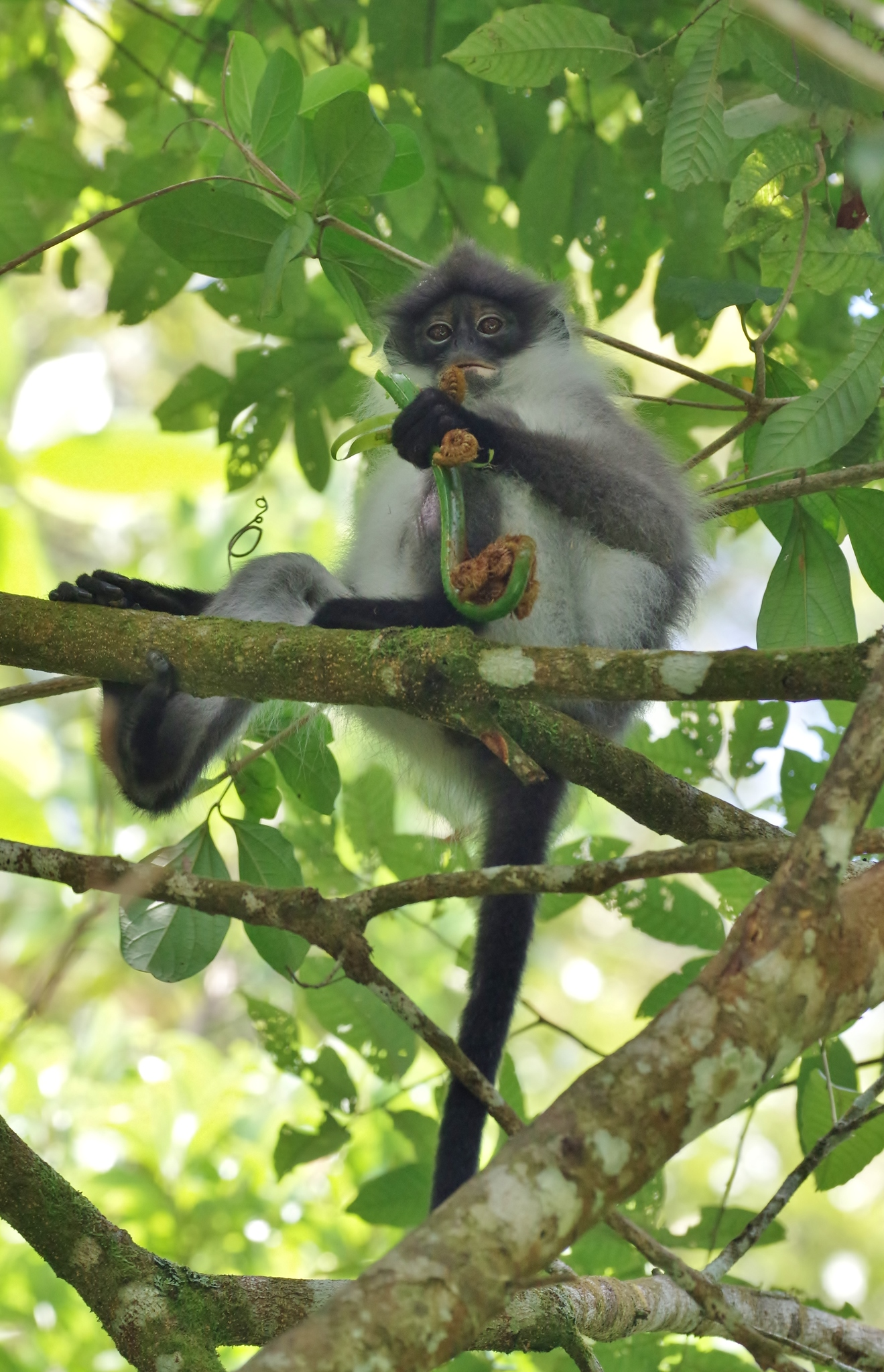
White-thighed surili, (Presbytis Siamensis)

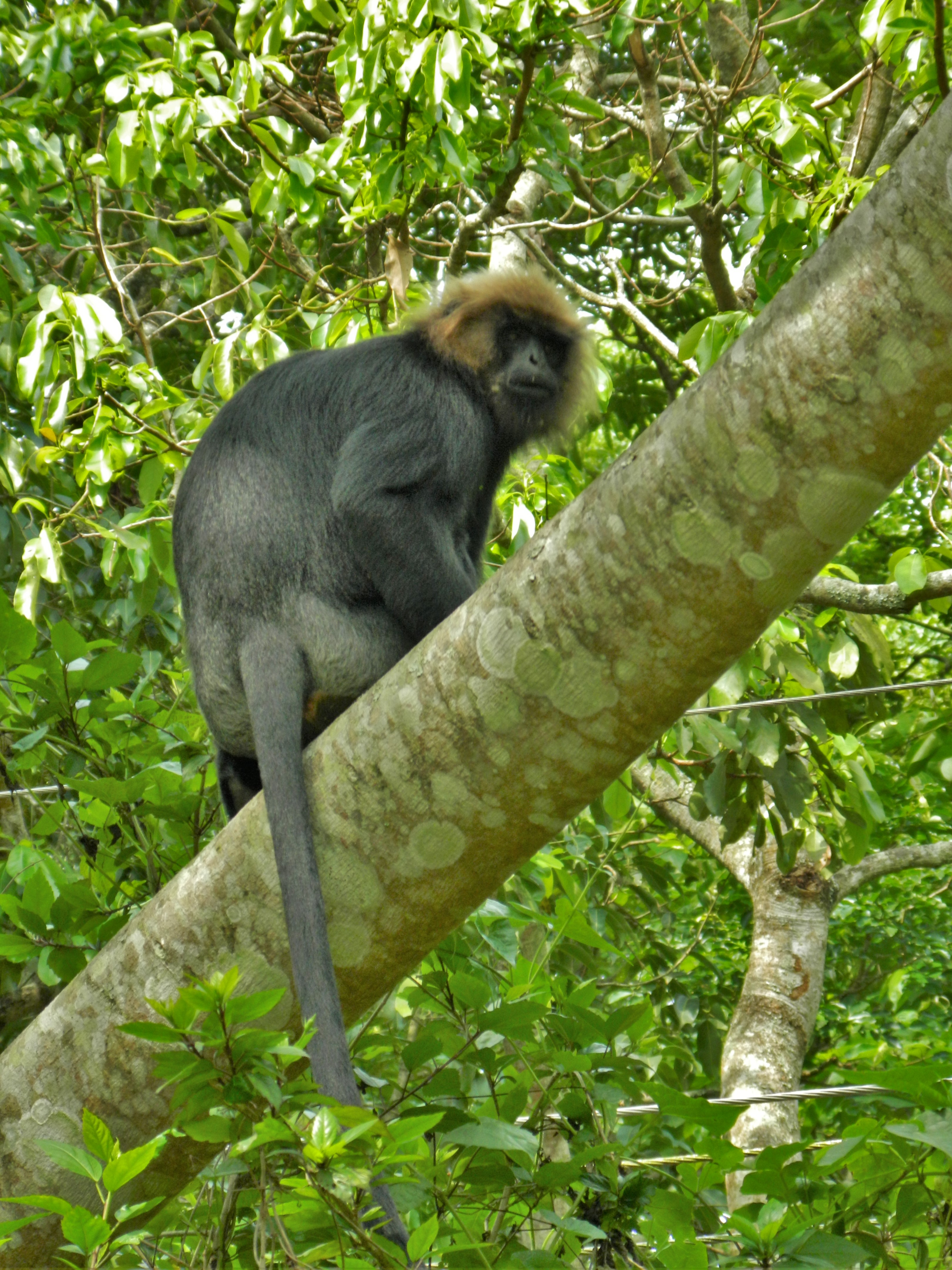
Nilgiri langur (Trachypithecus johnii)

Two subfamilies are recognized, the Cercopithecinae, which are mainly African, but include the diverse genus of macaques, which are Asian and North African, and the Colobinae, which includes most of the Asian genera, but also the African colobus monkeys.

The Linnaean classification beginning with the superfamily is:

- Superfamily Cercopithecoidea
  - Family Cercopithecidae: Old World monkeys
    - Subfamily Cercopithecinae
      - Tribe Cercopithecini
        - Genus Allenopithecus – Allen's swamp monkey
        - Genus Miopithecus – talapoins
        - Genus Erythrocebus – patas monkeys
        - Genus Chlorocebus
        - Genus Cercopithecus – guenons
        - Genus Allochrocebus – terrestrial guenons
      - Tribe Papionini
        - Genus Macaca – macaques
        - Genus Lophocebus – crested mangabeys
        - Genus Rungwecebus – kipunji
        - Genus Papio – baboons
        - Genus Theropithecus – gelada
        - Genus Cercocebus – white-eyelid mangabeys
        - Genus Mandrillus – mandrill and drill
    - Subfamily Colobinae
      - African group
        - Genus Colobus – black-and-white colobuses
        - Genus Piliocolobus – red colobuses
        - Genus Procolobus – olive colobus
      - Langur (leaf monkey) group
        - Genus Semnopithecus – gray langurs or Hanuman langurs
        - Genus Trachypithecus – lutungs
        - Genus Presbytis – surilis
      - Odd-nosed group
        - Genus Pygathrix – doucs
        - Genus Rhinopithecus – snub-nosed monkeys
        - Genus Nasalis – proboscis monkey
        - Genus Simias – pig-tailed langur

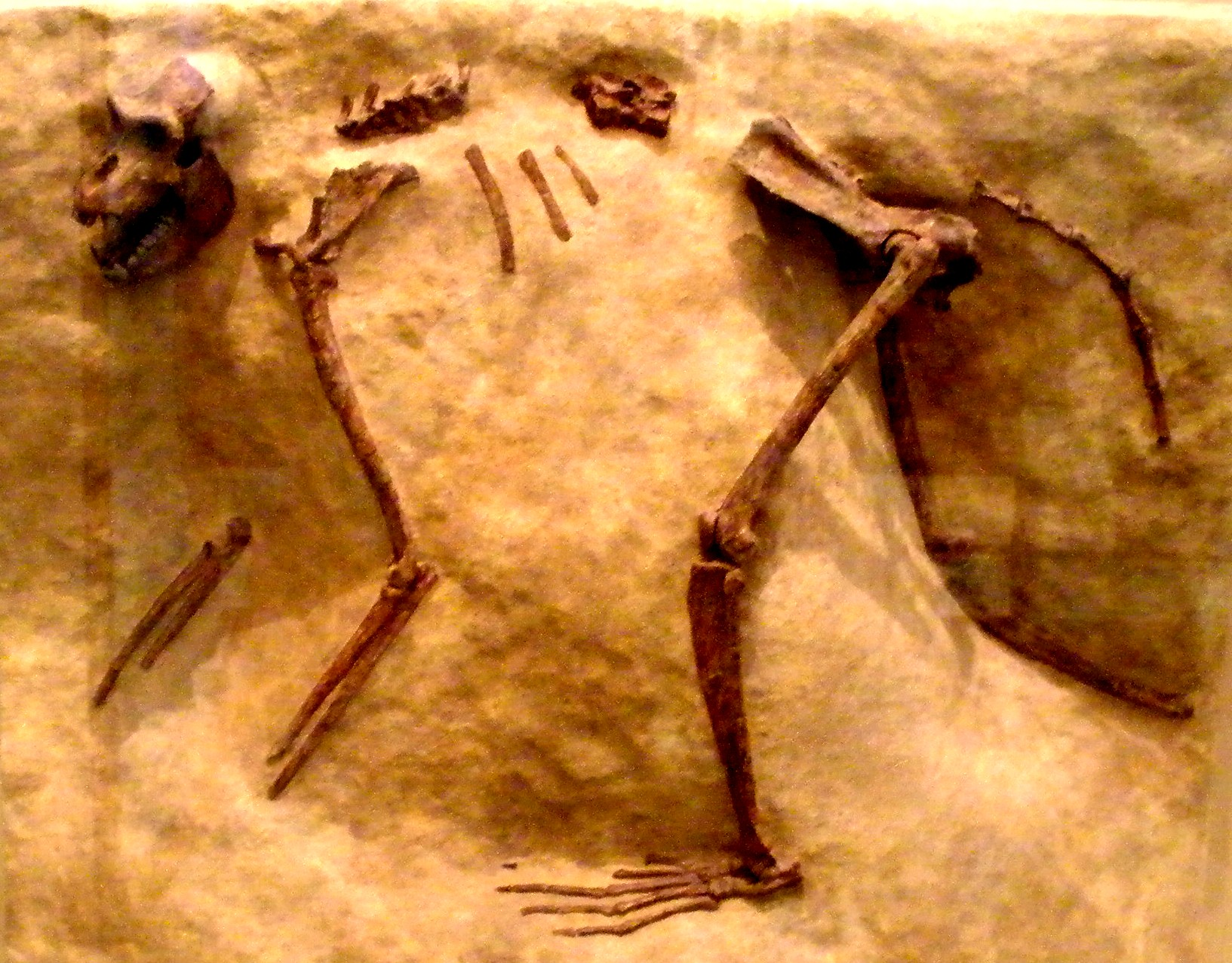
Paracolobus chemeroni fossil

The distinction between apes and monkeys is complicated by the traditional paraphyly of monkeys: Apes emerged as a sister group of Old World monkeys in the catarrhines, which are a sister group of New World monkeys. Therefore, cladistically, apes, catarrhines and related contemporary extinct groups, such as Parapithecidae, are monkeys as well, for any consistent definition of "monkey".

"Old World monkey" may also legitimately be taken to be meant to include all the catarrhines, including apes and extinct species such as Aegyptopithecus, in which case the apes, Cercopithecoidea and Aegyptopithecus as well as (under an even more expanded definition) even the Platyrrhini emerged within the Old World monkeys. Historically, monkeys from the "Old World" (Afro-Arabia), somehow drifted to the "New World" some 40 million years ago, forming the "New World monkeys" (platyrrhines). Apes would emerge later within the Afro-Arabia group.

== Characteristics ==
Old World monkeys are medium to large in size, and range from arboreal forms, such as the colobus monkeys, to fully terrestrial forms, such as the baboons. The smallest is the talapoin, with a head and body 34–37 cm (13–15 in) in length, and weighing between 0.7 and 1.3 kilograms (1.5 and 2.9 lb), while the largest is the male mandrill (the females of the species being significantly smaller), at around 70 cm (28 in) in length, and weighing up to 50 kilograms (110 lb).

Most Old World monkeys have tails (the family name means "tailed ape"), unlike the tailless apes. The tails of Old World monkeys are not prehensile, unlike those of the New World monkeys (platyrrhines).

The distinction of catarrhines from platyrrhines depends on the structure of the rhinarium, and the distinction of Old World monkeys from apes depends on dentition (the number of teeth is the same in both, but they are shaped differently). In platyrrhines, the nostrils face sideways, while in catarrhines, they face downward. Other distinctions include both a tubular ectotympanic (ear bone), and eight, not twelve, premolars in catarrhines, giving them a dental formula of: 2.1.2.32.1.2.3

Several Old World monkeys have anatomical oddities. For example, the colobus monkeys have stubs for thumbs to assist with their arboreal movement, the proboscis monkey has an extraordinary nose, while the snub-nosed monkeys have almost no nose at all.

The penis of the male mandrill is crimson and the scrotum is lilac; the face is also brightly colored. The coloration is more pronounced in dominant males.

== Habitat and distribution ==
The Old World monkeys are native to Africa and Asia today, inhabiting numerous environments: tropical rain forests, savannas, shrublands, and mountainous terrain. They inhabited much of Europe during the Neogene period.

== Behaviour and ecology ==
=== Diet ===
Most Old World monkeys are at least partially omnivorous, but all prefer plant matter, which forms the bulk of their diet. Leaf monkeys are the most vegetarian, subsisting primarily on leaves, and eating only a small number of insects, while the other species are highly opportunistic, primarily eating fruit, but also consuming almost any food items available, such as flowers, leaves, bulbs and rhizomes, insects, snails, and even small vertebrates. The Barbary macaque's diet consists mostly of leaves and roots, though it will also eat insects and use cedar trees as a water source.

=== Reproduction ===
Gestation in the Old World monkeys lasts between five and seven months. Births are usually single, although, as with humans, twins occur occasionally. The young are born relatively well-developed, and are able to cling onto their mother's fur with their hands from birth. Compared with most other mammals, they take a long time to reach sexual maturity, with four to six years being typical of most species.

=== Social systems ===
In most species, daughters remain with their mothers for life, so that the basic social group among Old World monkeys is a matrilineal troop. Males leave the group on reaching adolescence, and find a new troop to join. In many species, only a single adult male lives with each group, driving off all rivals, but others are more tolerant, establishing hierarchical relationships between dominant and subordinate males. Group sizes are highly variable, even within species, depending on the availability of food and other resources.

== See also ==
- List of Old World monkey species
- List of primates by population
