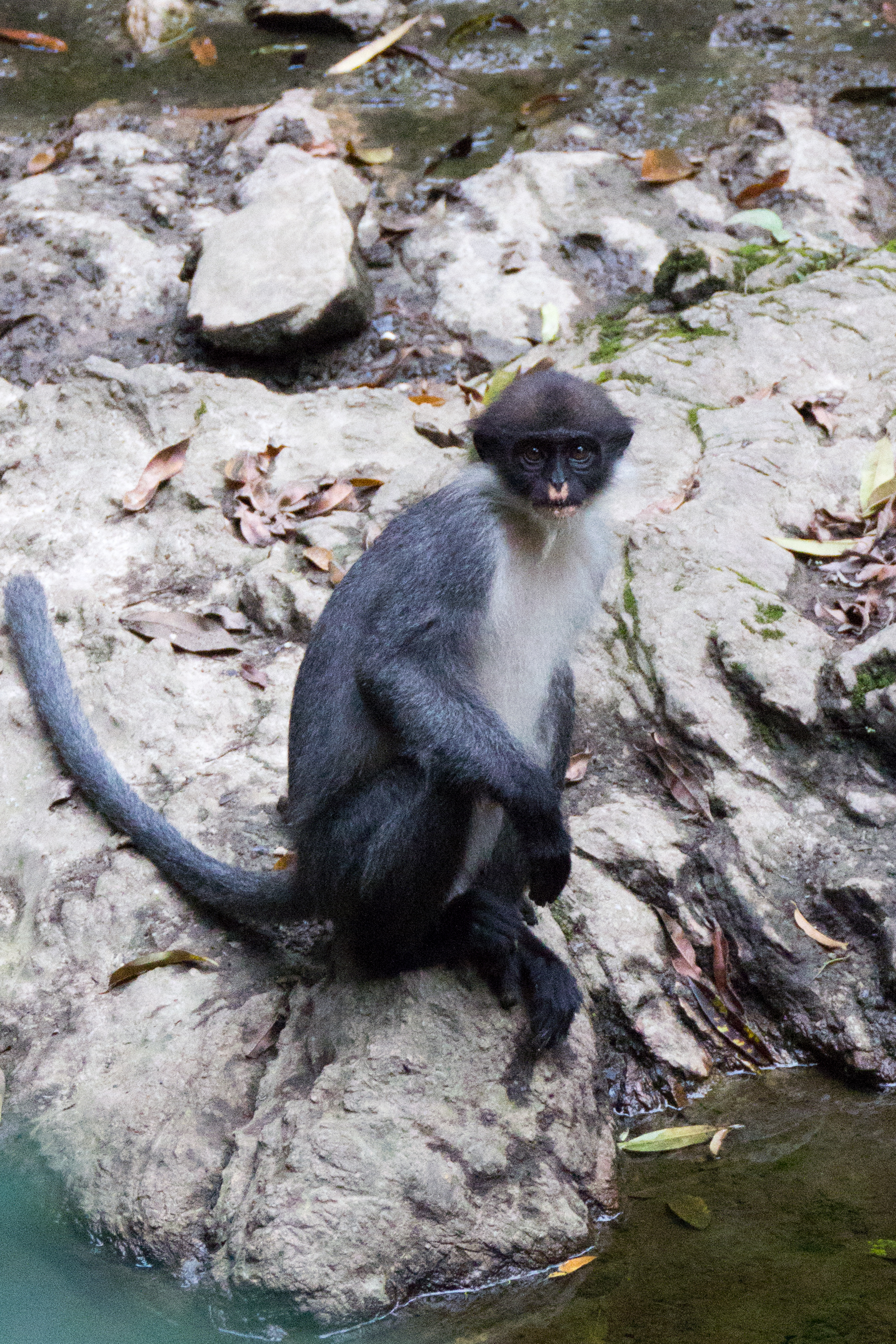

Conservation status
- Endangered (IUCN 3.1)

Scientific classification
- Kingdom: Animalia
- Phylum: Chordata
- Class: Mammalia
- Infraclass: Placentalia
- Order: Primates
- Family: Cercopithecidae
- Genus: Presbytis
- Species: P. canicrus

Binomial name
- Presbytis canicrus Miller, 1934
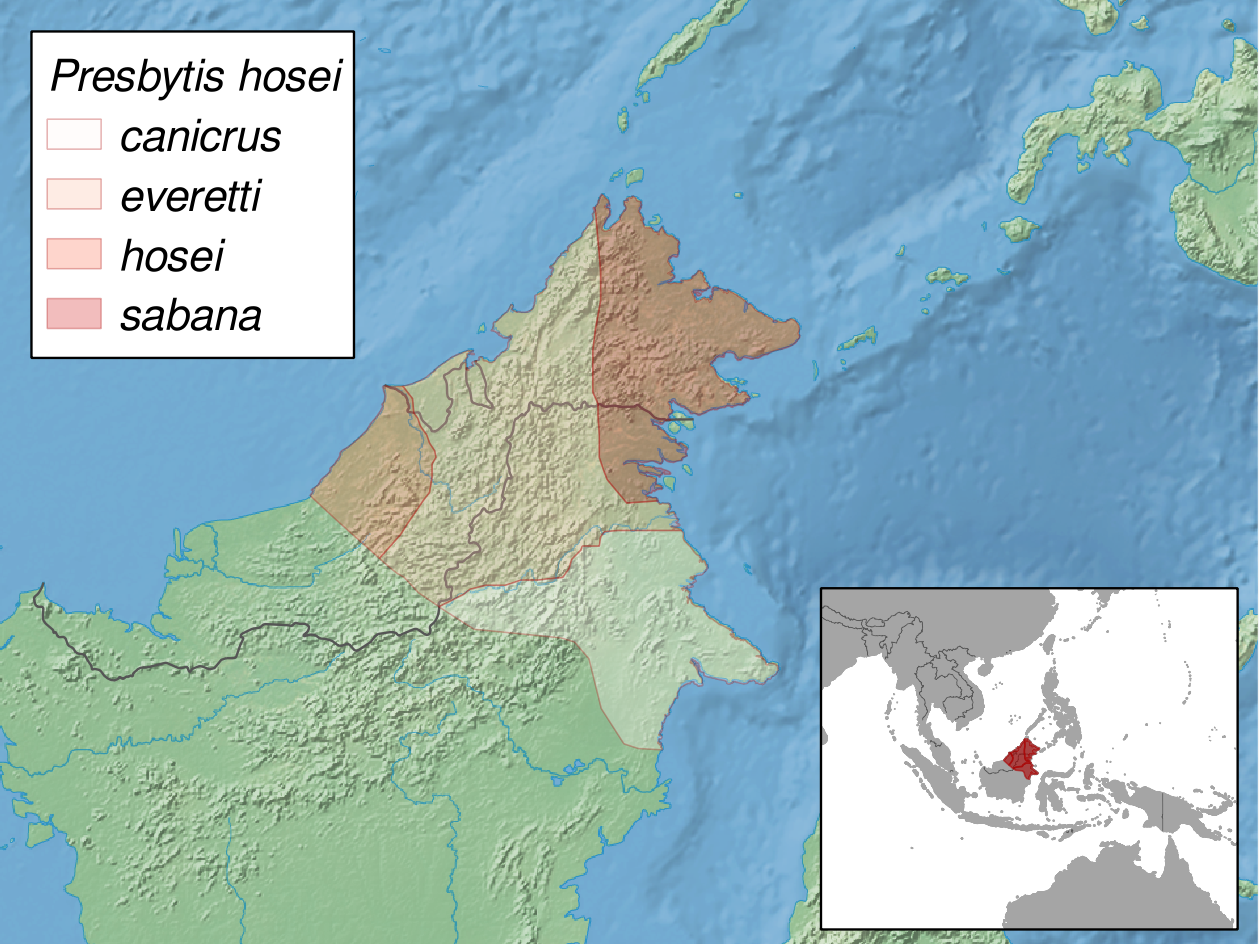
- Range shown in light green (i.e., for P. h. canicrus)

= Miller's langur =

Species of leaf monkey (mammal)

Miller's langur (Presbytis canicrus), also known as Miller's grizzled langur or Kutai grey langur, is a species of leaf monkey. It is endemic to East Kalimantan on the island of Borneo in Indonesia. It is one of the world's most endangered primates, and was at one time thought to be extinct, until it was rediscovered in 2012.

== Taxonomy ==
Miller's langur is a leaf monkey within the family Cercopithecidae and subfamily Colobinae. It was formerly considered a subspecies of Hose's langur, Presbytis hosei (as Presbytis hosei canicrus). It was split from P. hosei on the basis of different morphology by primatologists Colin Groves and Christian Roos.

== Distribution and habitat ==
Miller's langur is native to the island of Borneo in the province of East Kalimantan in Indonesia. It lives in dipterocarp rainforests up to an elevation of about 1,000 metres (3,300 ft).

== Description ==
Miller's langur ranges from 48 centimetres (19 in) to 56 centimetres (22 in) long excluding tail and has a tail length ranging from 65 centimetres (26 in) to 84 centimetres (33 in). Males weigh from 6 kilograms (13 lb) to 7 kilograms (15 lb) while females weight between 5.5 kilograms (12 lb) and 6 kilograms (13 lb). The fur on its back is gray with a grizzly appearance, and the fur on its belly is whitish. The upper part of its face is black while the lower part of its face is whitish, with the whitish part forming a U shape below the nose. It has a brown crown at the top of its head. Infants are white with a black cross on their backs.

== Habits ==
A majority of Miller's langur's diet comes from young leaves and leaf shoots, and their next most important food item is unripe fruit. It also consumes other items such as eggs, seeds and flowers. It typically lives in groups ranging from 5 to 12 animals including a single adult male, with an average group size of 8 monkeys. Non-group males are solitary. It is sympatric with two other leaf monkeys from the genus Presbytis, the maroon leaf monkey and the white-fronted surili. It is known to utilize salt licks along with sympatric maroon leaf monkeys. It is arboreal and diurnal, and spends a majority of its time in the mid to upper canopy of the forest.

== Conservation status ==
Miller's langur is listed as endangered by the IUCN due primarily to habitat loss, fragmentation and hunting. It is one of the rarest primates in Borneo. With little information available, it was thought to be extinct several times. In 2012, a team of international scientists rediscovered it in Wehea Forest in East Kalimantan, Borneo, disproving its extinction. Wehea Forest is outside Miller's langur's previously known range, which was primarily Kutai National Park to the south of Wehea. The scientists used mineral licks and cameras to show that the species still exists, and had difficulty identifying it from the photos since so few photos previously existed. Limited to a geographical range from the central coast of East Kalimantan to the Kutai National Park, the species is highly regarded as an endemic and extremely vulnerable primate. Experts speculate it becoming extinct in the very near future, due to multiple factors such as deforestation and overhunting for its bezoar stones and as a food source. The bezoar stones, which are smooth, hard mineral deposits found in the digestive tracts of some animals, are used as good luck charms, and also for its alleged ability to neutralize some poisons, but only occur in a minority of the monkeys. Although Miller's langur is protected under Indonesian law, the legal protections may be ineffective because it is listed under a defunct scientific name, P. aygula.

In October of 2019, Forrest Galante led an expedition and recorded the first video evidence of a Miller's langur in the 21st century.
