= Kutai National Park =

National park in Indonesia

- IUCN category II (national park)
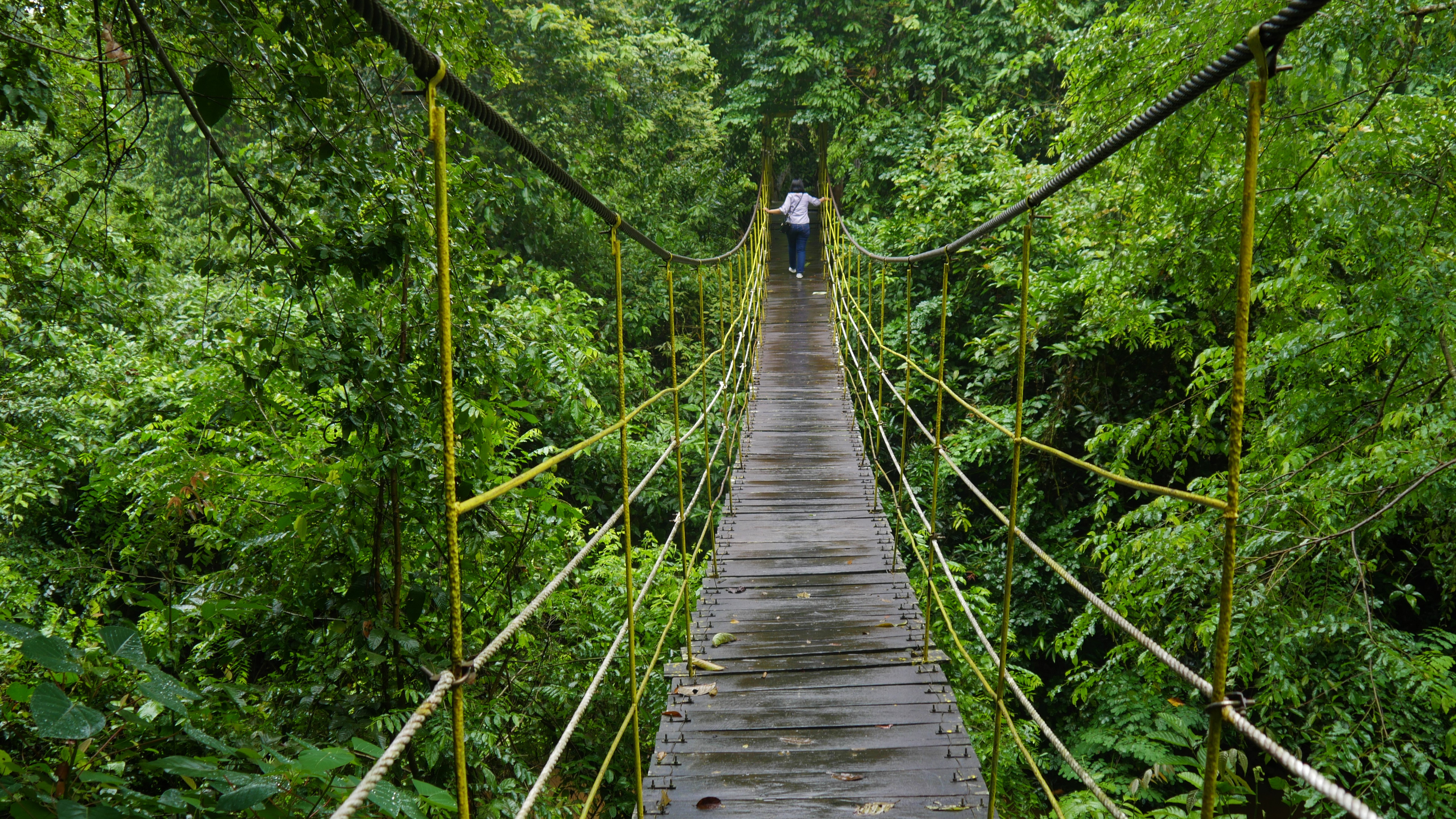
- Sangkima Jungle Park, Kutai NP.

- Location within Borneo
- Location: East Kalimantan, Indonesia
- Nearest city: Bontang
- Coordinates: 0°22′N 117°16′E
- Area: 1,986 km^{2} (767 sq mi)
- Established: 1982
- Governing body: Ministry of Forestry

Kutai National Park is a lowland national park located on the east coast of Borneo Island, in the East Kalimantan province of Indonesia, ranging approximately 10 to 50 km north of the equator.

== Geography ==
The park is located north of the Mahakam River and includes several lakes: Danau Maau, Santan, Besar and Sirapan. It is adjacent to the towns of Bontang and Sangatta and 120 km north of the provincial capital Samarinda. There are several traditional Bugis settlements within the national park.

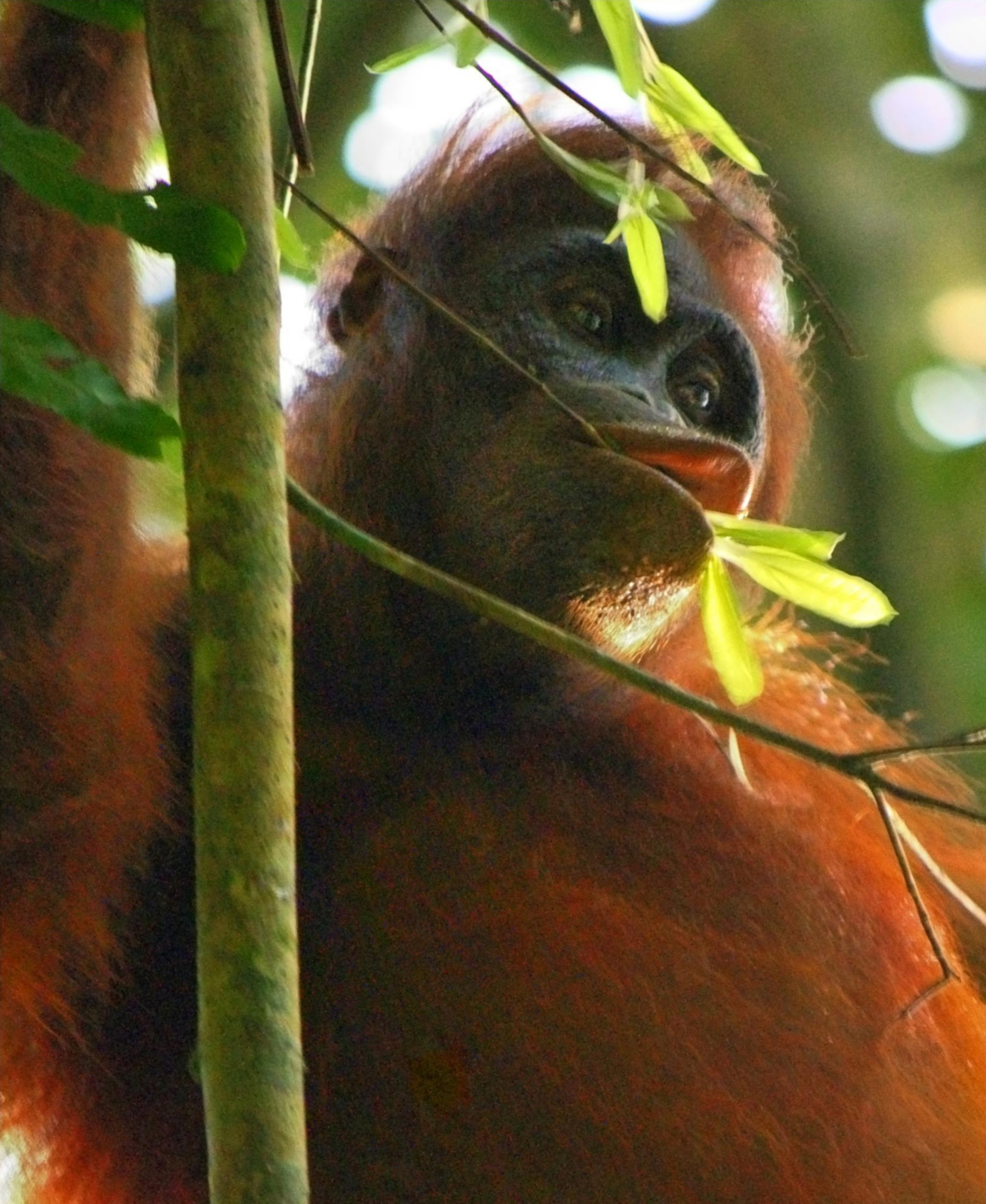
Orangutan in the Kutai forest

The Kutai National Park extends over an area of 2,000 km^{2}, part of the former Kutai Game Reserve which has been protected since the 1970s. However this status did not prevent the logging of a third of the forest in subsequent years and the following introduction of mining companies. In an attempt to prevent further deforestation the Kutai National Park was established in 1982. Nevertheless, the great Borneo fires of 1982/83 destroyed large sections of the forest, and the constant encroachment of people along the eastern boundary continues to reduce the true park area. Approximately only 30% of the primary growth forest remains.

Samarinda International Airport is the only major gateway to the national park. There are two main point for tourist access to the park. Sangkima is on the road between Sangatta and Bontang and thus is accessible by car or bus. The area has a number of old formal national park buildings. There is a large loop walking track, with sections of elevated boardwalk to what was one of the largest trees known in the park. Given the ease of accessibility and being adjacent to the road, this area of park is continually under pressure from the encroachment of people.

Prevab is the second tourist area, approximately 25 minutes boat ride up the Sangatta River from Kabo Pier (a boat ramp on the northern bank, on the western side of the town of Sangatta). Access to the park is gained by road travel to Kabo Pier and the short river trip in a ketinting (a traditional small boat for navigating rivers). The more remote nature of this section sees the jungle in fairly good condition with little disturbance of the area.

== Ecology ==
Kutai National Park is dominated by a Dipterocarpaceae lowland tropical rainforest and has 958 species of flora, including 8 of the world's 9 genera of family Dipterocarpaceae, 41 species of orchids and 220 species of medical plants. The other vegetation types include coastal mangrove forest, freshwater swamp forest, and kerangas forest.

The park provides habitat to 10 species of primates, 90 species of mammals and 300 species of birds. They include orangutan, Malayan sun bear, sambar deer, banteng, maroon leaf monkey, white-fronted leaf monkey, Miller's langur, proboscis monkey, Bornean gibbon, clouded leopard, black flying squirrel, marbled cat, flat-headed cat, yellow-throated marten, otter civet, and smooth-coated otter.

The number of orangutans was found to have decreased dramatically, from 600 recorded in 2004 to about 60 in 2009. However a survey conducted in 2010 identified over 2,000 orangutans to be inhabiting the park.

== See also ==
- List of national parks of Indonesia
