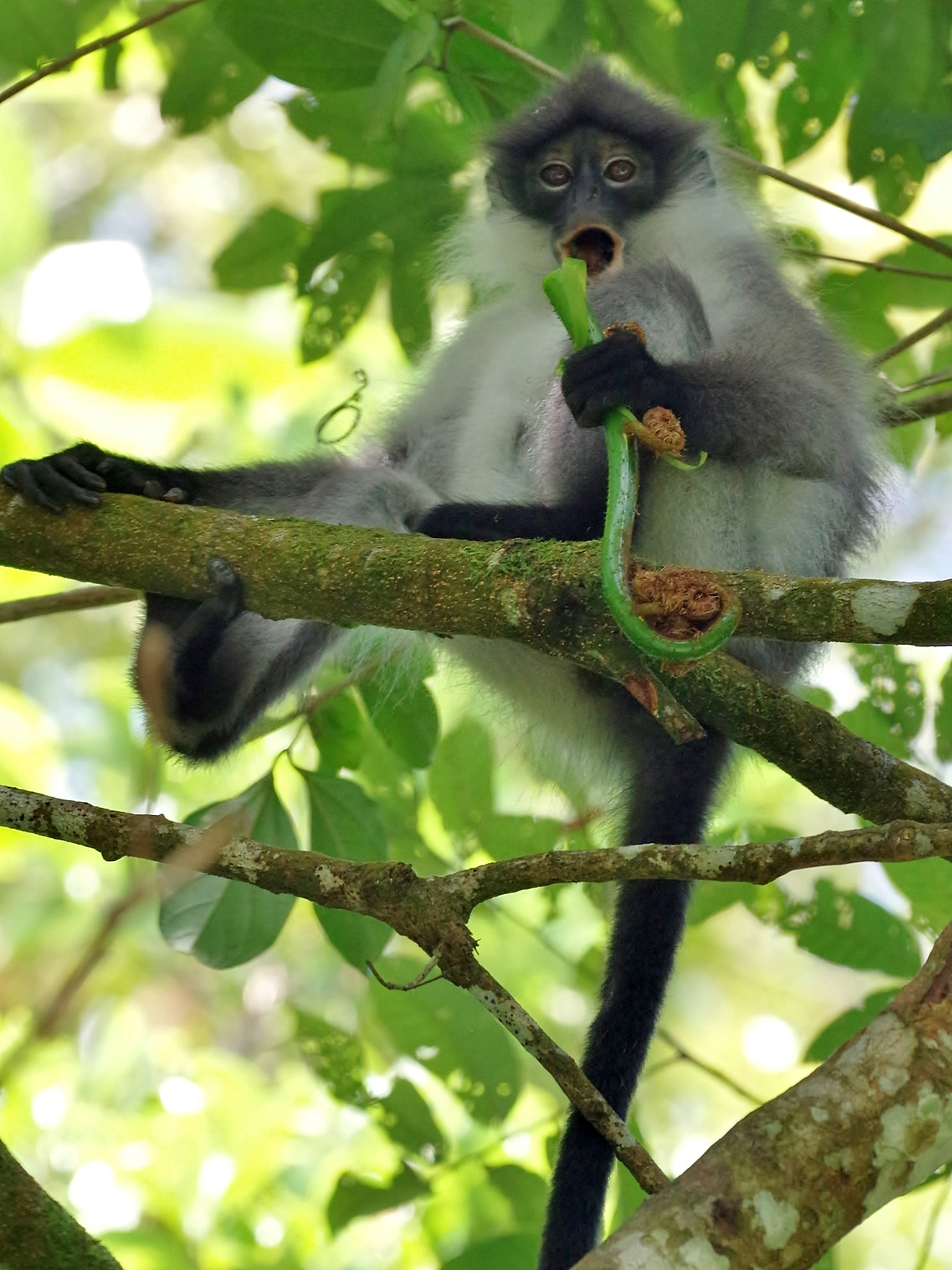
- On Pahang, Malaysia

Conservation status
- Near Threatened (IUCN 3.1)

Scientific classification
- Kingdom: Animalia
- Phylum: Chordata
- Class: Mammalia
- Infraclass: Placentalia
- Order: Primates
- Family: Cercopithecidae
- Genus: Presbytis
- Species: P. siamensis

Binomial name
- Presbytis siamensis (S. Müller & Schlegel, 1838)
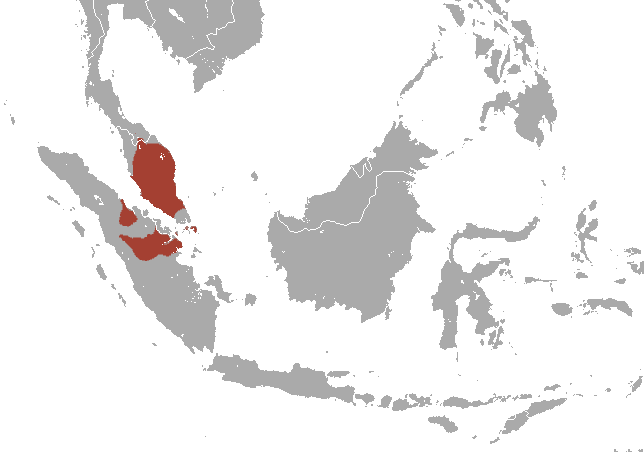
- White-thighed surili range

= White-thighed surili =

Species of Old World monkey

The white-thighed surili (Presbytis siamensis) is a species of primate from the family of old world monkeys (Cercopithecidae). This species lives arboreal amongst the sub-montane forests. It is endemic to the Thai-Malay Peninsula, the Riau Archipelago and Sumatra. In addition, the white-thighed surili contain four subspecies: siamensis (nominate), cana, paenulata and rhionis, are recognized here. Furthermore, they are characterized by the white patches located on the outside of their legs, which is what gives them their name. Additionally, they can be referred to as pale-thighed langur/surili. These primates are an important species for the diversity of forest environments in the Malaysian area.

== Description ==
=== Physical ===
The white-thighed surili are made up of a common surili build, ranging from around 41–69 cm tall and weighing 5–6.7 kg. Their slender build is covered with a brown-grey fur coat on their backs, with white fur covering their bellies and dark fur on their head. They are known for the white fur on the outsides of their thighs (giving them their name). Additionally, their tails – typically covered in dark fur – can extend roughly 58–85 cm. Compared to adults, infants are born with very light fur with crosses of dark fur along their arms and back.

=== Habitat ===
As an arboreal species, P. siamensis live in subtropical/tropical forest environments. They have been found to occupy moist lowland or swamp areas. In fact, they can even be inhabitants of terrestrial environments; for example, rural gardens. They can be located mainly on the Malay Peninsula, but are also found in Sumatra, as well as some parts of Thailand.

=== Social organization ===
The white-thighed surili live in small unimale-multifemale groups. After mating, females give birth to single infants to which the group of females care for. Due to their arboreal lifestyle, reliance on detection of predators is vital. Male group members are able to call or display a distraction for predators to protect group members. Furthermore, this predator avoidance strategy is shown to be more effective with smaller groups.

== Taxonomy ==
Presbytis siamensis is a member of the old world monkeys, family Cercopithecidae. Understanding of phylogenetic relationships and taxonomy in the genus remains unclear and requires further research.

P. siamensis has variously been considered a subspecies of P. melalophos, or as a species in its own right.

Research suggests that three Presbytis species are endemic to Malaysia: P. siamensis, P. femoralis and P. robinsoni (Robinson's Banded langur).

Phylogenetic analysis of fragments of two mitochondrial genes suggests that P. siamensis and P. robinsoni form a clade together, and that P. femoralis is most closely related to P. rubicunda. The same study also found evidence for ongoing gene flow between Robinson's banded langur and the white-thighed surili. More recent molecular phylogenetic analysis using a fragment of a single mitochondrial gene also suggests that P. siamensis is most closely related to P. robinsoni, but indicates that this clade is sister to P. femoralis.

The IUCN SSC Primate Specialist Group recognizes four subspecies: P. s. siamensis, cana, paenulata, and rhionis. Research suggests the white-thighed surili includes P. natunae (Natuna Island surili) as a subspecies; however both have also been considered subspecies of P. femoralis (Banded surili).

== Threats ==
According to the IUCN Red List, the current status of the white-thighed surili is near threatened. Researchers say several Presbytis species are affected by logging activities, although not all of them are recognized on the IUCN red list.

Conservation efforts for non-human primates - such as the white-thighed surili - are valued significantly. This species is seen in the public's eye as a value of science, genetics, forest sustainability, aesthetic, tourism, and a symbol of heritage. Researchers suggest continuing to familiarize the public with primate conservation concerns to enhance the willingness of participate in conservation efforts. In addition, only 30% of the forested area on the Malaysian Peninsula is legally protected from resource extraction, leaving 70% of forests vulnerable. More research on abundance, ecology and behavioural biology of the white-thighed surili is vital to creating better conservation management plans.

An alternative threat to this species has nothing to do with logging. Sometimes these primates may be kept as pets or used in the entertainment industry. Currently this species is listed under Appendix II of the Convention on International Trade in Endangered Species (CITES) to protect them from this. Moreover, education the public on illegal trade of primates as pets may combat the demand for the industry.
