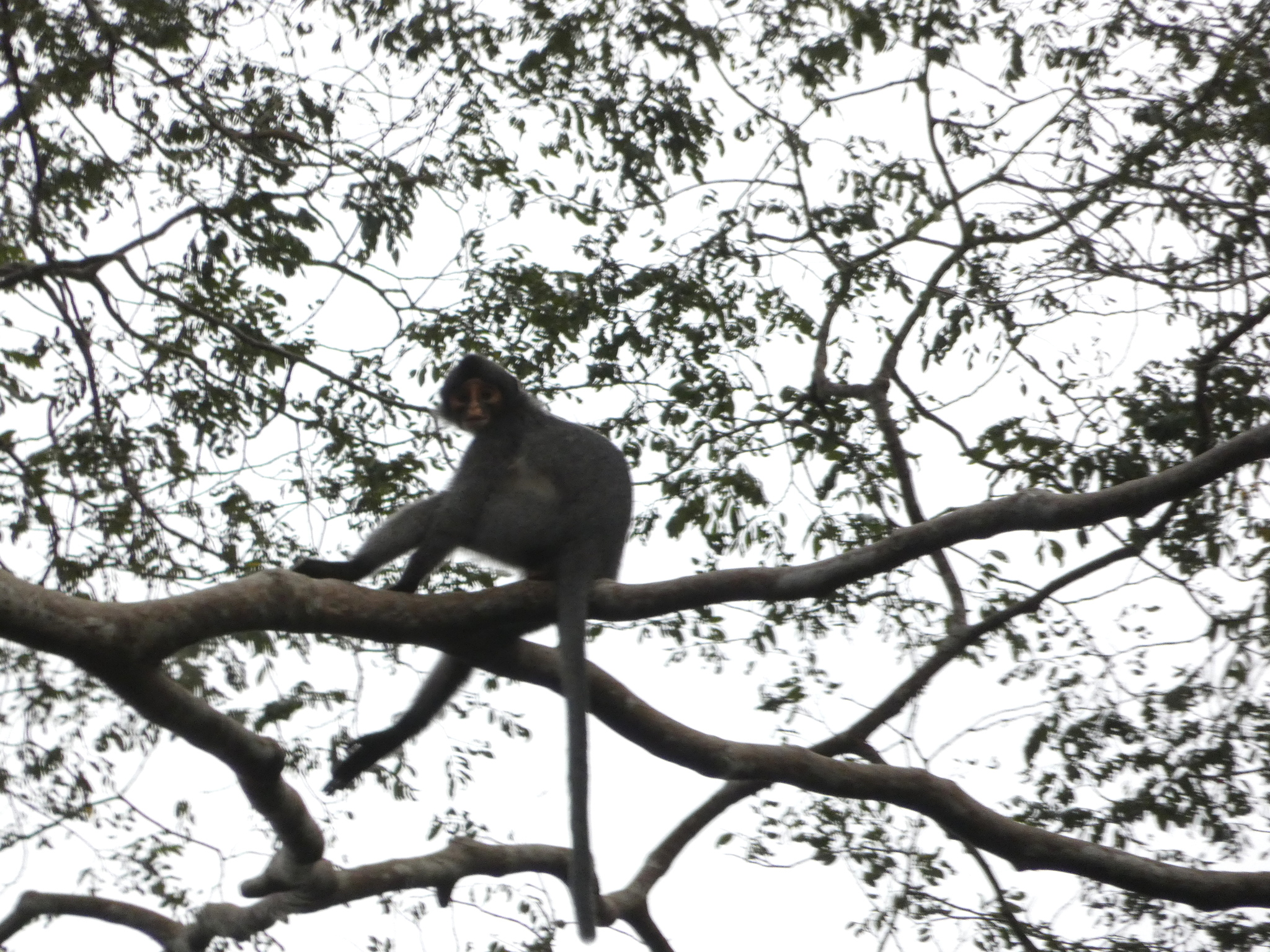

Conservation status
- Endangered (IUCN 3.1)

Scientific classification
- Kingdom: Animalia
- Phylum: Chordata
- Class: Mammalia
- Order: Primates
- Family: Cercopithecidae
- Genus: Presbytis
- Species: P. sabana

Binomial name
- Presbytis sabana (Thomas, 1893)
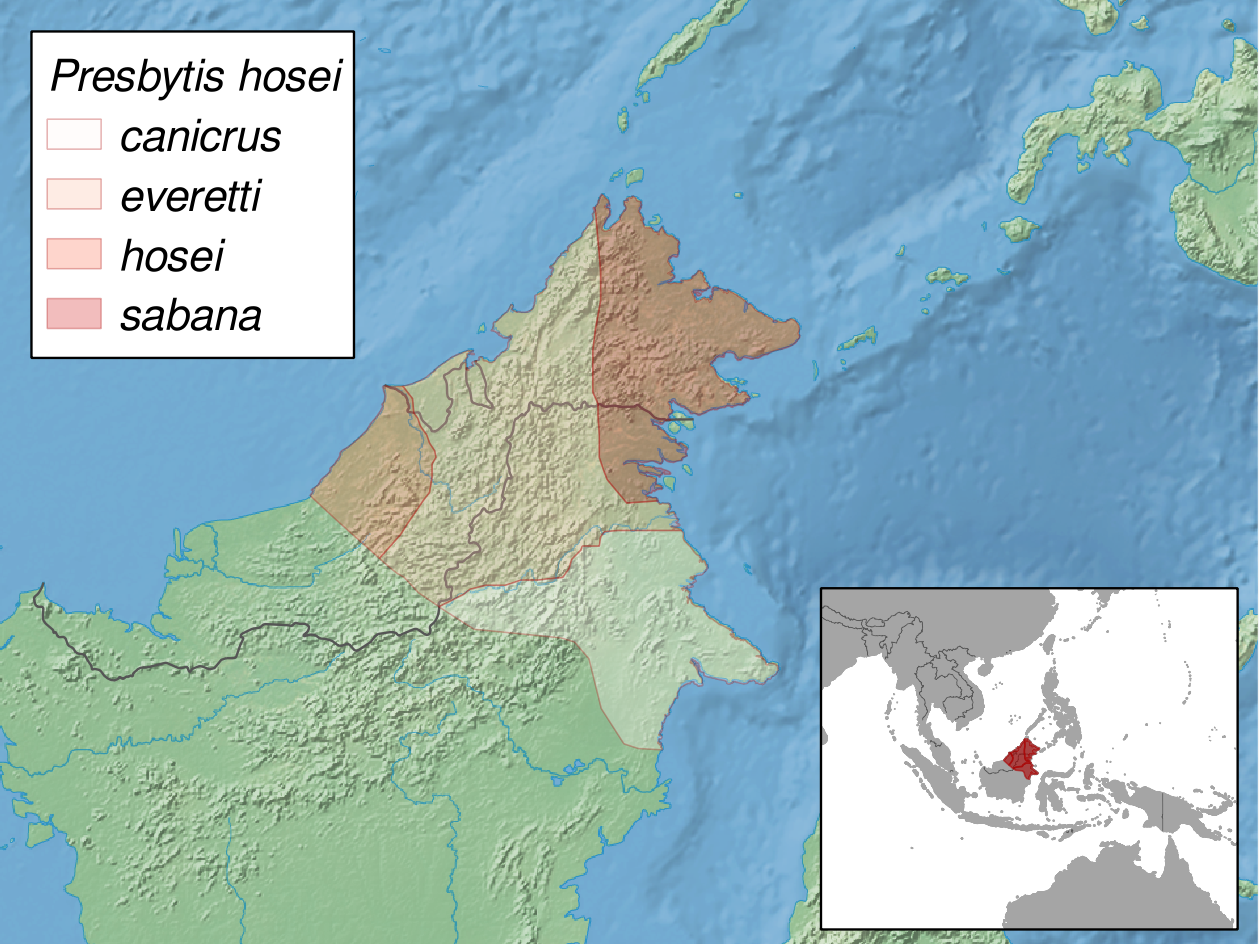
- Range shown in darker brown (i.e., for P. h. sabana)

= Sabah grizzled langur =

Species of monkey

The Sabah grizzled langur (Presbytis sabana), also known as the Saban grizzled langur, is a species of monkey in the family Cercopithecidae. It was formerly considered a subspecies of Hose's langur, Presbytis hosei (as Presbytis hosei sabana). The Sabah grizzled langur is native to the island of Borneo in the province of Sabah in Malaysia, with part of its range in Indonesia. It is listed as endangered by the IUCN due primarily to habitat loss, fragmentation and hunting.

== Description ==
The Sabah grizzled langur is mostly gray, with white underparts and black hands and feet. Sabah grizzled langurs range from 48 centimetres (19 in) to 56 centimetres (22 in) long excluding tail and have a tail length ranging from 64 centimetres (25 in) to 84 centimetres (33 in). Males weigh from 6 kilograms (13 lb) to 7 kilograms (15 lb) while females weight between 5.5 kilograms (12 lb) and 6 kilograms (13 lb).

== Diet & behaviour ==
The Sabah grizzled langur is arboreal and diurnal. It lives in groups of about seven animals including a single adult male. Males who are not part of a group are solitary. It has a varied diet consisting of leaves, fruit, seeds, flowers, insects and bark, and it also consumes mineral-rich mud. It sometimes associates with the maroon langur.
