= Brent Loken =

American ecologist (born 1970)

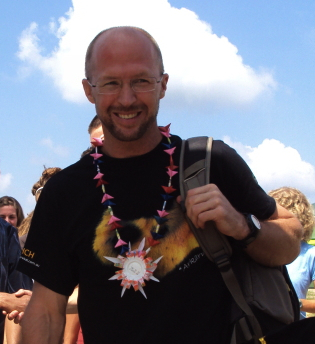
- Born: July 22, 1970 (age 55)
- Scientific career
- Fields: Global Sustainability, Food System

Brent Loken is a global sustainability and food system scientist. His work focuses on feeding everyone on the planet healthy diets within planetary boundaries. He participated in several research and development projects in Borneo and has published several articles on food systems and environmental sustainability including as a lead author on the EAT-Lancet Commission on Food, Planet, Health. He serves as the Global Food Lead Scientist for WWF. He was formally director of science translation for EAT, an Oslo-based organization that focuses on the global food system.

== Education ==
Loken earned a bachelor's degree from Augustana College in 1994, a master's degree in curriculum and instruction from the University of Colorado Boulder in 2000, and a PhD in resource and environmental management at Simon Fraser University in 2016. In 2008, Loken earned National Board Certification in physics from the National Board for Professional Teaching Standards. He was awarded both the Trudeau Doctoral Scholarship and Vanier Canada Graduate Scholarship to pursue his PhD studies.

== Career ==
In 2007, he was part of a team of teachers that helped to create the secondary department of Hsinchu International School. In 2009, he co-founded the nonprofit organization Integrated Conservation after traveling to Borneo and witnessing the loss of forests. His work centered on research, outreach, education, and development activities in East Kalimantan.

In 2013, Loken was part of an international team of scientists who photographed a Miller's grizzled langur in Wehea Forest. The monkey is one of the most endangered primates and had not been found in previously known habitats.

In 2015, Loken reported on Bornean orangutans traveling along trails on the ground, which was a previously unknown behavior.

In 2019, Loken was co-author on the landmark EAT-Lancet Commission on Food, Planet, Health.

2020 to present, Loken is working on several projects to translate the global scientific targets from the EAT-Lancet into country and city level targets to help achieve the Paris Agreement.
