= Amanda Korstjens =

Ecologist

- Education: Utrecht University (PhD)
- Scientific career
- Workplaces: University of Liverpool, Bournemouth University

Amanda Korstjens is an ecologist in the UK, she is Professor of Behavioural Ecology at Bournemouth University and is an expert in primate ecology.

== Education and career ==
As a Masters student Korstjens did projects on immunology, but it was research in Indonesia working Thomas's langur that inspired her to work on primates.

Korstjens was awarded a PhD in biology from Utrecht University in 2001, for her thesis she worked on colobine monkeys in Taï National Park in Côte d'Ivoire. She was a postdoctoral researcher at the University of Liverpool before joining Bournemouth University as a lecturer in 2006, subsequently rising to professor.

In 2009 she was awarded Fellowship of the Higher Education Academy.

== Research ==
Korstjens research works looks at how environment shapes the behaviour of animals. With Robin Dunbar and Julia Lehmann she researched how time budgeting, that is the proportion of time spent on activities such as foraging versus forming social bonds, is important for different types of mammals to adapt to different habitats. In later work she combined this knowledge with climate change scenarios to predict potential habitat loss for gorilla and chimpanzee populations

In 2015 she launched the LEAP project Landscape Ecology And Primatology linking up researchers focussing on how deforestation affects the stability of tropical ecosystems, the species living in them and the carbon stored.

In 2019 she wrote a book chapter The Effect of Climate Change on the Distribution of the Genera Colobus and Cercopithecus in the book Primate Research and Conservation in the Anthropocene edited by Alison Behie and published by Cambridge University Press.
