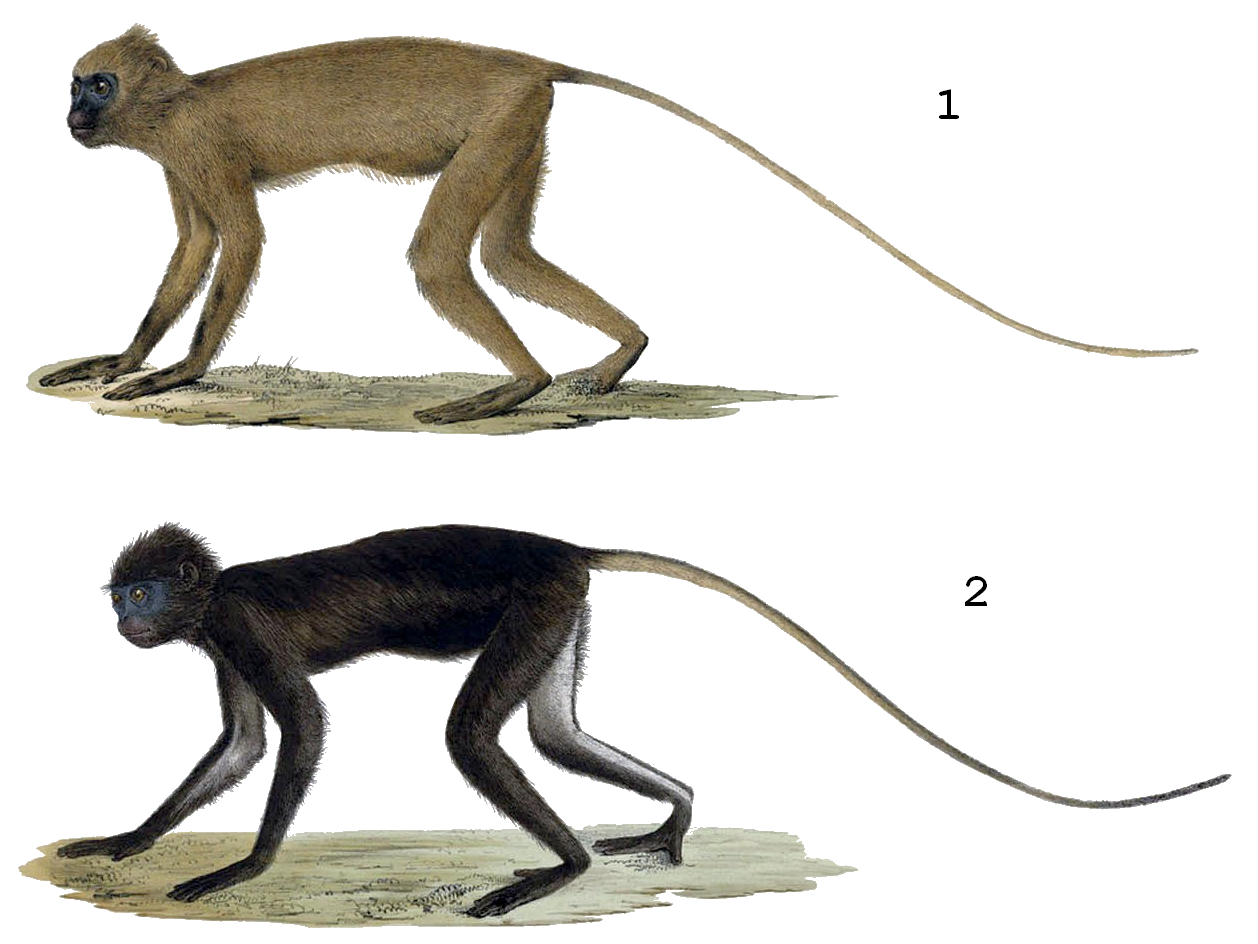
- 1 - female, 2 - male.

Conservation status
- Critically Endangered (IUCN 3.1)

Scientific classification
- Kingdom: Animalia
- Phylum: Chordata
- Class: Mammalia
- Infraclass: Placentalia
- Order: Primates
- Family: Cercopithecidae
- Genus: Presbytis
- Species: P. chrysomelas

Binomial name
- Presbytis chrysomelas (S. Müller, 1838)
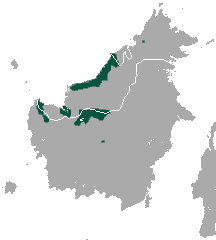
- Sarawak surili range

= Sarawak surili =

Species of Old World monkey

The Sarawak surili, Bornean banded langur, or cross-marked langur (Presbytis chrysomelas) is a species of primate in the family Cercopithecidae. It is endemic to the southeast Asian island of Borneo, where it is distributed north of the Kapuas River in Kalimantan, Indonesia, the Malaysia states of Sarawak and Sabah, and in Brunei. Its taxonomy is complex and disputed, and it has been considered a subspecies of P. femoralis or P. melalophos. The Sarawak surili was formerly considered common, but has declined drastically due to persecution and habitat loss, and as of 2015 is only known from five sites with a combined population of 200–500 individuals. Consequently, it is believed to be one of the rarest primates in the world, and has been rated as critically endangered by IUCN.
