= Ledjie Taq =

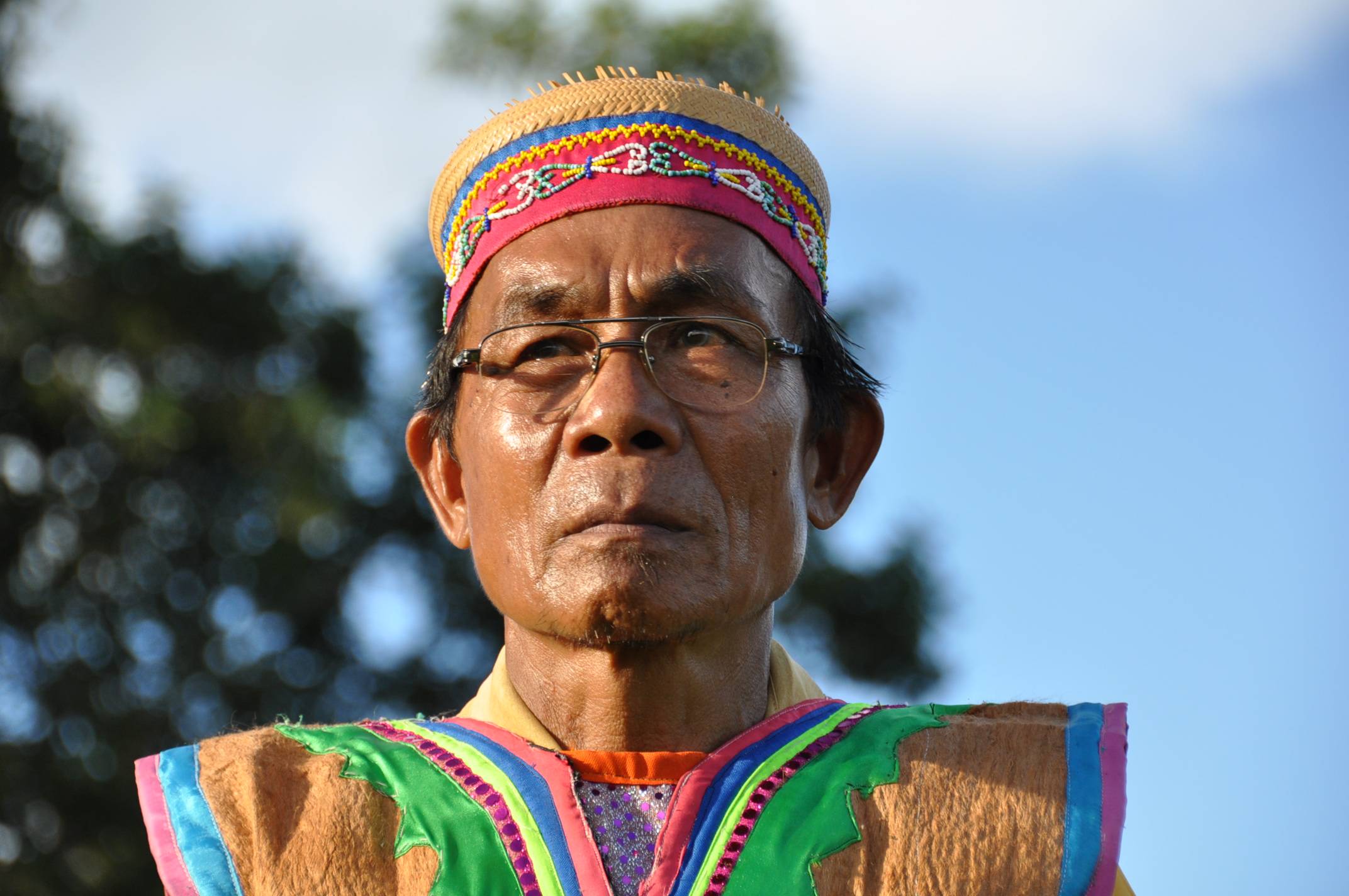
- Born: February 19, 1953 (age 73); Nehas Liah Bing
- Known for: Efforts to protect Wehea Forest, Borneo
- Scientific career
- Workplaces: Kepala adat of Nehas Liah Bing

Ledjie Taq is the Kepala adat of the Wehea Dayak village of Nehas Liah Bing, East Kalimantan, Indonesia. He is known for his efforts to protect the Wehea Forest.

== Early Life and Background ==
Ledjie Taq was born on February 19, 1953 in the Wehea Dayak village of Nehas Liah Bing, on the Wehea River. He works as an elementary school teacher and farmer and became the elected leader (kepala adat) of the Wehea Dayak in 2002. Since this time he has been working to protect the Wehea Forest.

== Protecting Wehea Forest ==
In 2004, the Wehea Dayak community of Nehas Liah Bing (Nehas) feared their forest would be lost forever. In response to this threat, the community banded together and declared the Wehea Forest a "locally protected forest". The man leading this conservation effort is the 61-year-old Ledjie Taq, the tribal leader of the Wehea Dayak of East Kalimantan. In recognition of conservation efforts, President Susilo Bambang Yudhoyono of Indonesia awarded Ledjie Taq the prestigious Bintang Jasa Pratama medal in 2009. In addition, Ledjie Taq won the Kalpataru Environment Savior Award, Indonesia's highest environmental honor.

Ledjie Taq gathered multi-lateral support for protecting Wehea Forest through a customary council meeting held in November 2004. Representatives from local Dayak communities, the local government and private sector attended this council meeting and agreed to support the declaration of 38,000 hectares of an abandoned timber concession as 'protected land' under Wehea Dayak traditional 'adat' law. The newly established protected area was given the local name Keldung Laas Wehea Long Skung Metgueen (The Wehea protected forest located between the rivers of Skung and Metgueen).

Ledjie Taq and the Wehea Dayak community wanted to protect Wehea Forest because of its importance as a source for water and medicinal plants, as well as non-timber forest products. In addition, Ledjie Taq knew that protecting Wehea Forest was critical for helping to protect the Wehea Dayak culture. As cultural head of the Wehea Dayak, Ledjie Taq knew that if the forest around Wehea was lost, important traditions and ceremonies would be lost as well. Since Wehea Forest lies within the historical territory of the Wehea Dayak, Ledjie Taq knew that protecting Wehea Forest under adat law was also important for recovering some of the Wehea Dayak traditional land rights.

To guard the newly protected forest from illegal activities, Ledjie Taq used traditional Wehea Dayak practices for conservation and established the Petkuq Mehuey (PM's), or forest guardians. He felt by merging traditional practices into the forest conservation program, the Wehea Dayak could also sustain and protect local traditions and culture. The PM's are a group of young people from the local community who protect the forest. They spend up to three months in the forest patrolling the borders for illegal loggers, collecting data on the flora and fauna found in Wehea Forest, and helping to implement new programs and initiatives.
