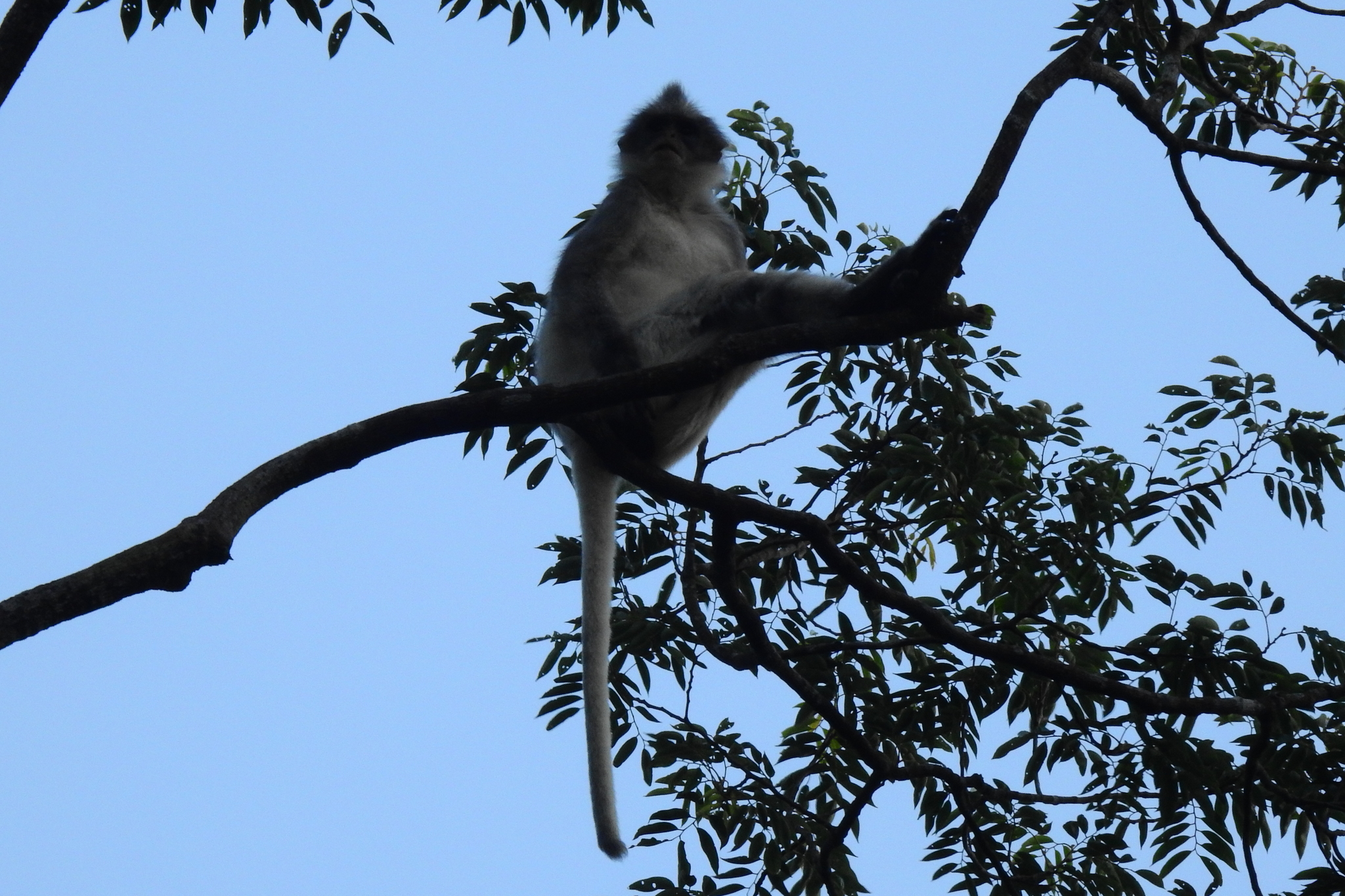

Conservation status
- Data Deficient (IUCN 3.1)

Scientific classification
- Kingdom: Animalia
- Phylum: Chordata
- Class: Mammalia
- Infraclass: Placentalia
- Order: Primates
- Family: Cercopithecidae
- Genus: Presbytis
- Species: P. bicolor

Binomial name
- Presbytis bicolor Aimi and Bakar, 1992

= Black-and-white langur =

Species of monkey

The black-and-white langur (Presbytis bicolor) is a species of monkey in the family Cercopithecidae. It was formerly considered a subspecies of the Black-crested Sumatran langur, Presbytis melalophos (as Presbytis melalophos bicolor) but genetic analysis revealed that these are separate species.

== Distribution ==
The black-and-white langur is native to the island of Sumatra in Indonesia. It is listed as data deficient by the IUCN.
