= Windsor Nature Park =

Nature park in Singapore

- Interactive map of Windsor Nature Park
- Type: Nature park
- Location: Singapore
- Coordinates: 01°21′27″N 103°49′21″E
- Area: 75 hectares (190 acres)
- Opened: 22 April 2017
- Operator: National Parks Board
- Status: Open

Windsor Nature Park is a nature park in Singapore. It was opened on 22 April 2017. The park forms a green buffer zone between Central Catchment Nature Reserve and the urbanized areas of Singapore. The park contains three hiking trails and a canopy walkway.

Several species of birds live in Windsor Nature Park, including the greater racket-tailed drongo. Mammals living in the park include the endangered Sunda pangolin. A group of bachelor Raffles' banded langur monkeys also lives in the park.
