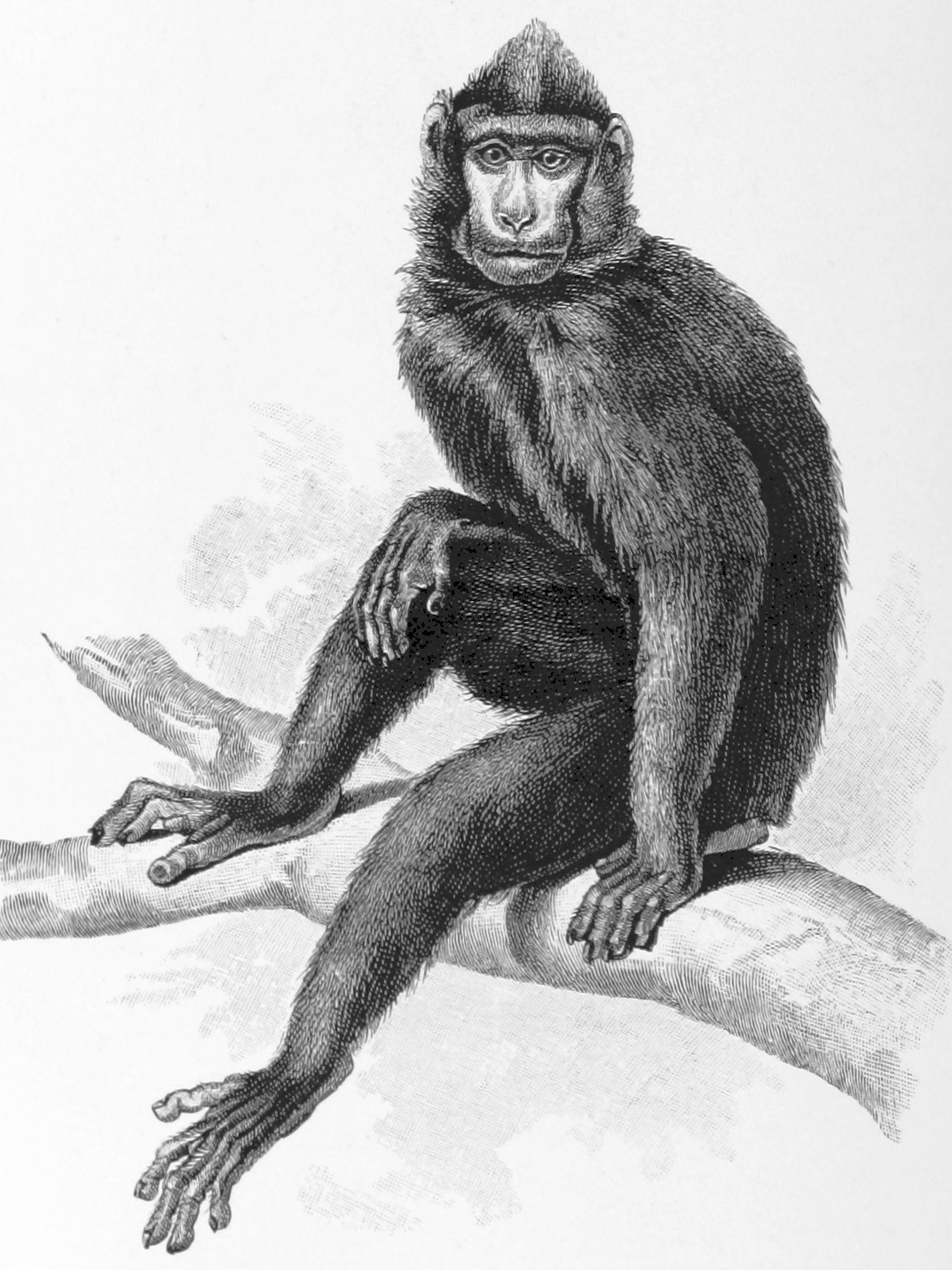

Conservation status
- Vulnerable (IUCN 3.1)

Scientific classification
- Kingdom: Animalia
- Phylum: Chordata
- Class: Mammalia
- Order: Primates
- Suborder: Haplorhini
- Infraorder: Simiiformes
- Family: Cercopithecidae
- Genus: Macaca
- Species: M. nigrescens

Binomial name
- Macaca nigrescens (Temminck, 1849)
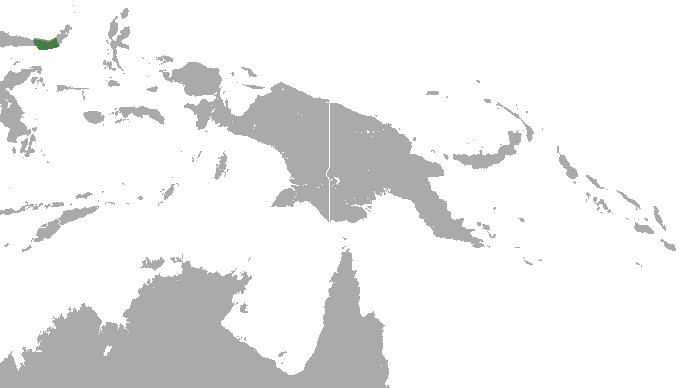
- Gorontalo macaque range

= Gorontalo macaque =

Species of mammal

The Gorontalo macaque or Dumoga-bone macaque (Macaca nigrescens) is a species of primate in the family Cercopithecidae. It is endemic to the island of Sulawesi in Indonesia.

== Gallery ==
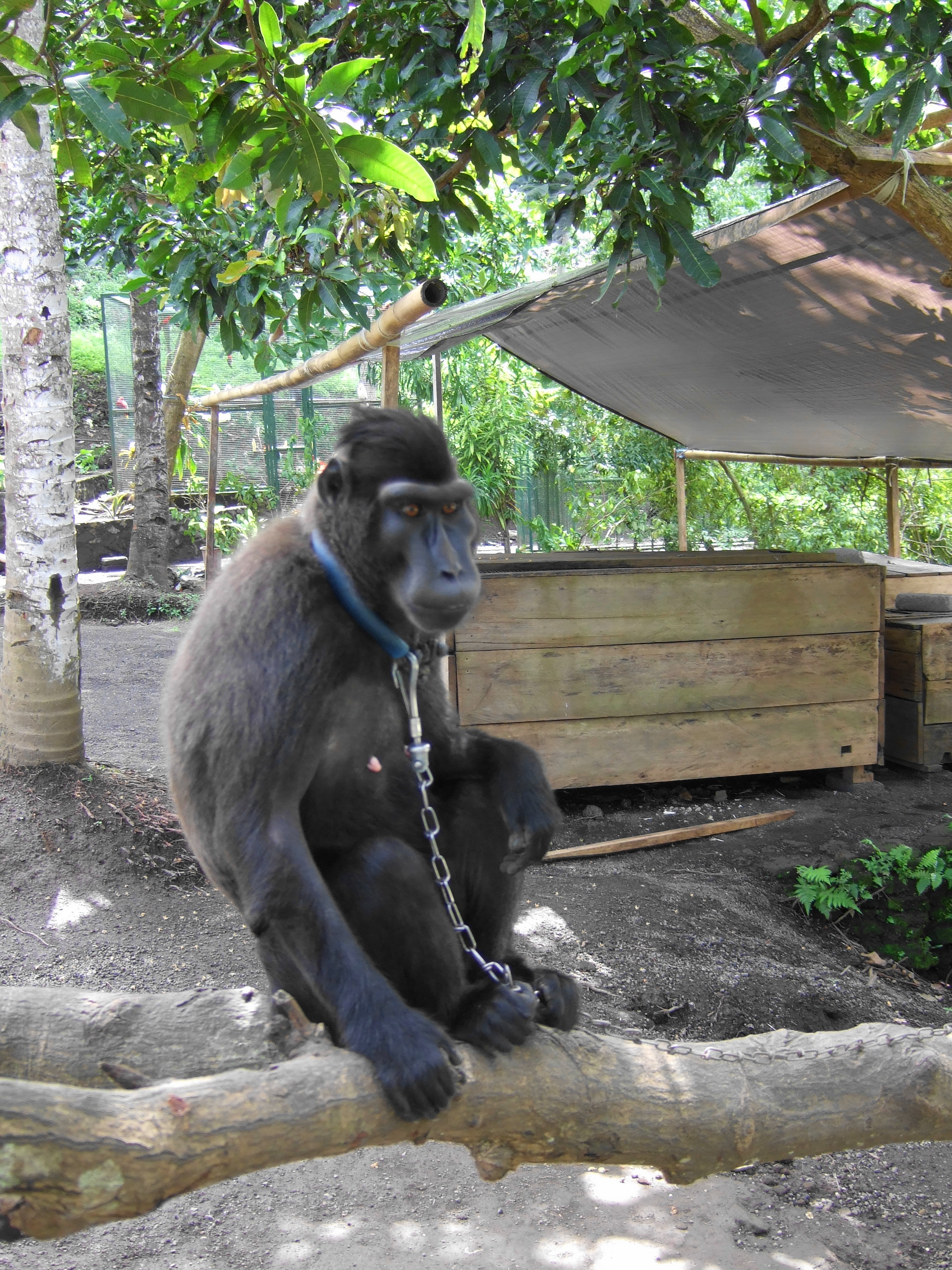
Captive female kept in Tandurusa Zoo
