= East Sumatran banded langur =

Conservation status
- Critically Endangered (IUCN 3.1)

Scientific classification
- Kingdom: Animalia
- Phylum: Chordata
- Class: Mammalia
- Infraclass: Placentalia
- Order: Primates
- Family: Cercopithecidae
- Genus: Presbytis
- Species: P. percura

Binomial name
- Presbytis percura Lyon, 1908

Species of primate in Sumatra

The East Sumatran banded langur (Presbytis percura), also known as the East Sumatran banded surili, is a species of monkey in the family Cercopithecidae. It was formerly considered a subspecies of the Raffles' banded langur Presbytis femoralis, but genetic analysis revealed it to be a separate species. Its range is restricted to the Riau Province of east-central Sumatra. Due to its declining population and restricted range in small, isolated forests subject to high rates of deforestation, the IUCN declared it to be a critically endangered species in 2020.
