= Wehea Forest =

Wehea Forest is a 38,000 ha rainforest located in East Kutai Regency, East Kalimantan, Borneo. Wehea was declared a protected forest in 2004 by the Wehea Dayak. This project received the Kalpataru Award in 2009, Indonesia's highest environmental honor. It currently is a co-managed forest between the local Wehea Dayak people from the village of Nehas Liah Bing and the Wehea Management Body. The Kepala Adat of Nehas Liah Bing is Ledjie Taq.

== Description ==
The Wehea Forest contains 38,000 hectares of mostly undisturbed forest bordered by large tracts of primary and secondary forests classified as logging concessions. Wehea is classified as a logging concession but paperwork has been submitted to change Wehea’s status to protection forest. Approximately 30% of Wehea has been selectively logged, with the last activity taking place in 1996. To date, approximately 40% of Wehea has been lightly explored.

Wehea Forest rises from an altitude of 250 m in the east to 1750 m in the west, with forest types ranging from lowland dipterocarp to montane forests. Typical rainfall amounts to 3000 mm per annum with a dry season from June to September and rainy season from November through February. The average temperature ranges from 24 to 35 degrees Celsius. The Wehea Forest is the watershed for the Wehea River in East Kutai Regency and the Long Gi River in the Berau Regency.

== Biodiversity ==
Biodiversity studies in Wehea by Integrated Conservation and The Nature Conservancy found it is home to endangered species such as the Bornean orangutan, Sunda clouded leopard and sun bear. In 2011, a team of scientists re-discovered the endangered Miller's Grizzled Langur in Wehea Forest. Research on the ecology of the Sunda clouded leopard, orangutan and other mammals has been done by Brent Loken.
