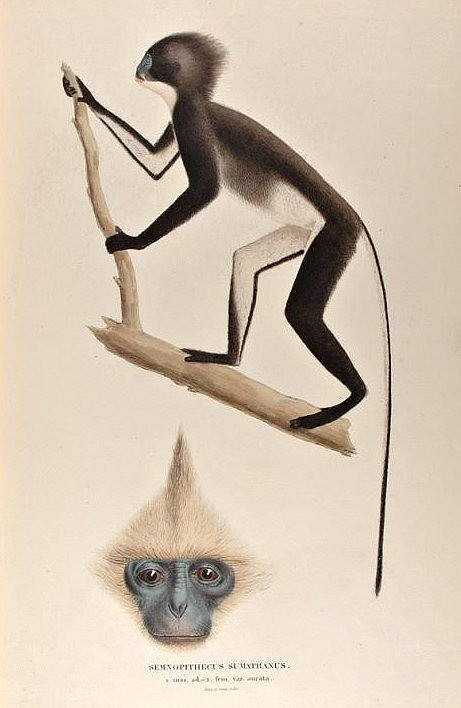

Conservation status
- Endangered (IUCN 3.1)

Scientific classification
- Kingdom: Animalia
- Phylum: Chordata
- Class: Mammalia
- Infraclass: Placentalia
- Order: Primates
- Family: Cercopithecidae
- Genus: Presbytis
- Species: P. sumatrana

Binomial name
- Presbytis sumatrana (S. Müller and Schlegel, 1841)

= Black Sumatran langur =

Species of monkey

The black Sumatran langur (Presbytis sumatrana) is a species of monkey in the family Cercopithecidae. It was formerly considered a subspecies of the Sumatran surili, Presbytis melalophos (as Presbytis melalophos sumatrana) but genetic analysis revealed that these are separate species. The black Sumatran langur is native to the island of Sumatra in Indonesia. It is listed as endangered by the IUCN due primarily to deforestation, and also due to animals taken for pets.
