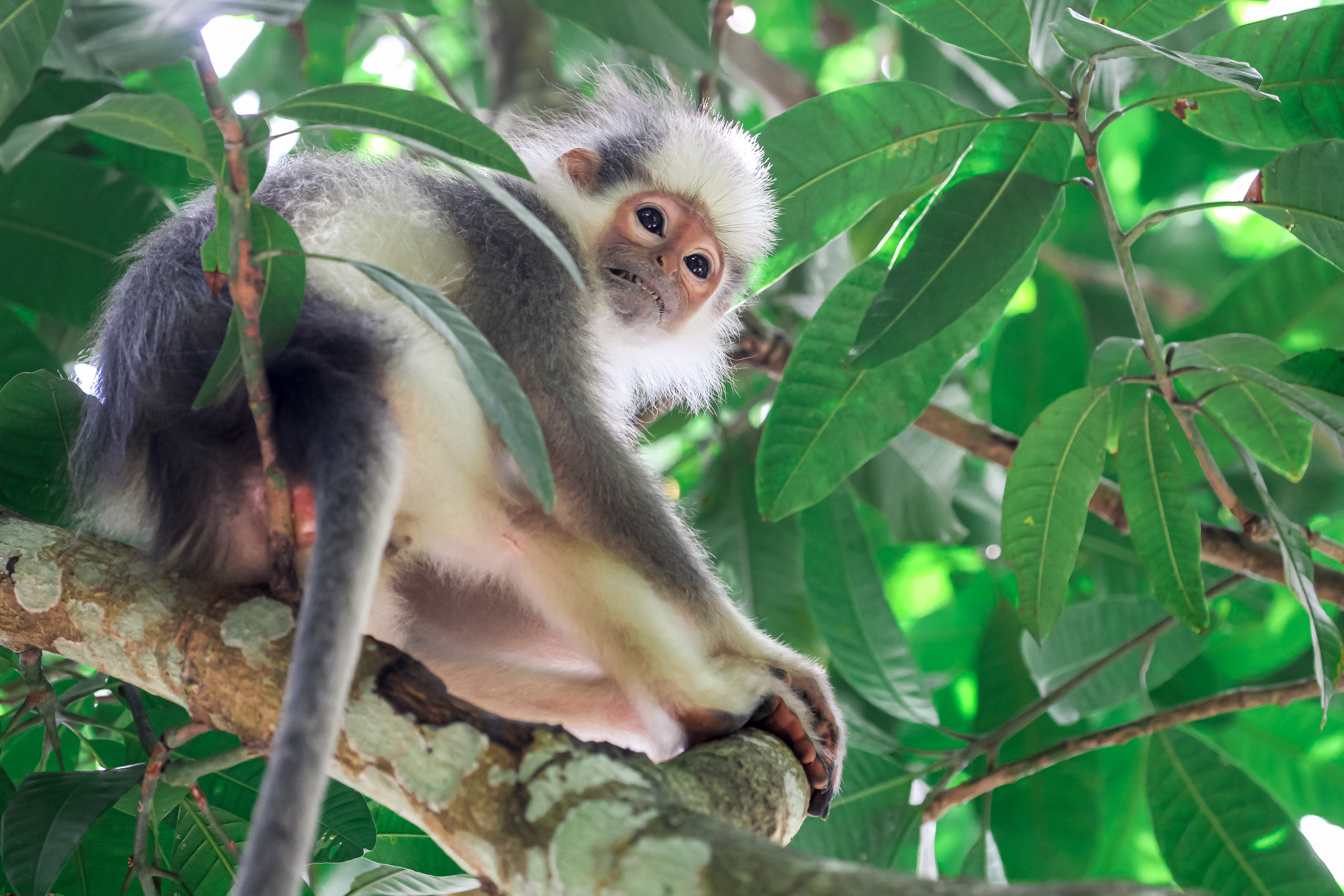

Conservation status
- Vulnerable (IUCN 3.1)

Scientific classification
- Kingdom: Animalia
- Phylum: Chordata
- Class: Mammalia
- Infraclass: Placentalia
- Order: Primates
- Family: Cercopithecidae
- Genus: Presbytis
- Species: P. mitrata

Binomial name
- Presbytis mitrata Eschscholtz, 1821

= Mitered langur =

Species of monkey

The mitered langur (Presbytis mitrata) is a species of monkey in the family Cercopithecidae. It was formerly considered a subspecies of the Sumatran surili, Presbytis melalophos (as Presbytis melalophos mitrata) but genetic analysis revealed that these are separate species. The mitered langur is native to the island of Sumatra in Indonesia. It is listed as vulnerable by the IUCN due primarily to deforestation, and also due to animals taken for pets.

The mitered langur has gray or brown fur on its back, which is darker than on its belly, and the arms, legs and tail are even darker. Its face is gray, with white ruffs on its cheeks and a white crown surrounded by a black arch on the top of its head. The head and body length is between 42 centimetres (17 in) and 57 centimetres (22 in) and the tail is between 62 centimetres (24 in) and 82 centimetres (32 in) long. It weighs up to about 5.9 kilograms (13 lb).

The mitered langur is diurnal and arboreal. Its diet consists of leaves, unripe fruits, flowers and seeds.
