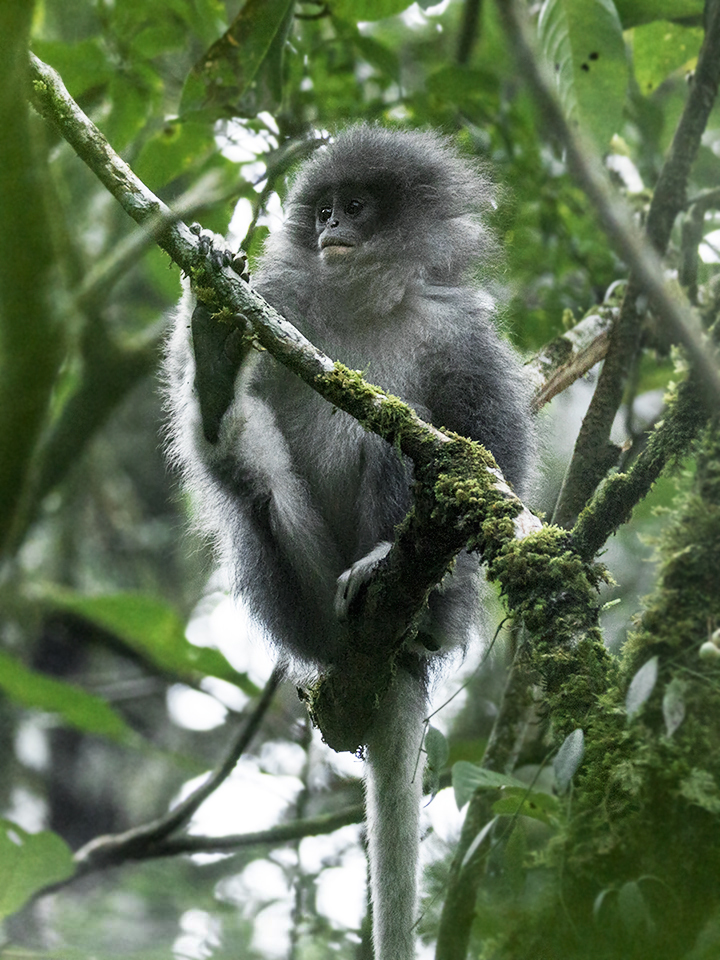

Conservation status
- Vulnerable (IUCN 3.1)

Scientific classification
- Kingdom: Animalia
- Phylum: Chordata
- Class: Mammalia
- Infraclass: Placentalia
- Order: Primates
- Family: Cercopithecidae
- Genus: Presbytis
- Species: P. comata

Binomial name
- Presbytis comata (Desmarest, 1822)
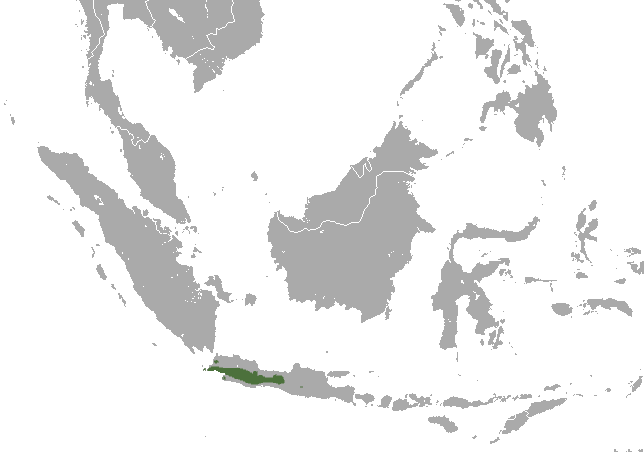
- Javan surili range

= Javan surili =

Species of Old World monkey

The Javan surili (Presbytis comata) is a vulnerable species of Old World monkey endemic to the western half of Java, Indonesia, a biodiversity hotspot. Other common names by which it is known by include gray, grizzled or Sunda Island surili; grizzled or stripe-crested langur; Javan grizzled langur; grizzled, Java or Javan leaf monkey; langur gris.

There are two subspecies of the Javan surili:

- Presbytis comata comata - Occurs in western Java
- Presbytis comata fredericae - Occurs in central Java

This colobine species has a sacculated stomach to assist the breakdown in the cellulose from the leaves it feeds on. It has a small, slender face and tail, and large round stomachs. Its coloring ranges from dark gray to white. Leaf monkeys tend to be active during the day, spending up to 5 hours grooming themselves.

== Distribution and habitat ==
The Javan surili occurs in the western half of Java, Indonesia. It ranges as far east as Mt. Lawu on the border with East Java. It is mostly confined to Sundaland due to changes in the geography, sea level and vegetation that occurred during the Pleistocene, and partly due to the type of vegetation and soil there today. The Javan surili lives in primary and secondary lowland rainforests up to an elevation of 2,500 m (8,200 ft).

== Ecology ==
The Javan surili mostly consumes leaves, however, it will also consume flowers, fruits, and seeds. This species appears to be more folivorous than any other member of the genus Presbytis, with over 62% of its overall diet composed of young leaves and 6% of mature leaves.

== Conservation ==
The Javan surili is listed as Vulnerable on the IUCN Red List because of habitat loss due to human activity. It is estimated that fewer than 1,000 exist today in their natural habitat and only 4% of their natural habitat remains. Most of the loss of its original habitat is due to the clearing of the rainforests in Indonesia. Only 4% of its original habitat remains and the population has decreased by at least 50% in the last ten years. Of the two subspecies of P. comata, the frediricae subspecies is among the rarest and most at risk for extinction, located in one of the most highly populated areas on the island and near an active volcano.
