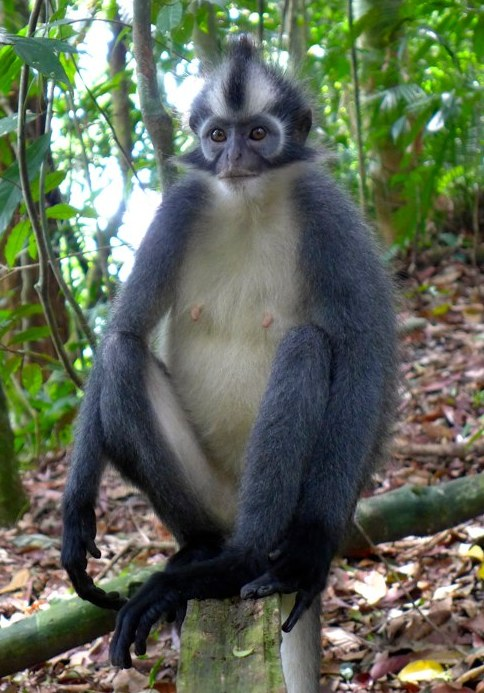
- Adult at the Bukit Lawang sanctuary.

Conservation status
- Vulnerable (IUCN 3.1)

Scientific classification
- Kingdom: Animalia
- Phylum: Chordata
- Class: Mammalia
- Order: Primates
- Suborder: Haplorhini
- Family: Cercopithecidae
- Genus: Presbytis
- Species: P. thomasi

Binomial name
- Presbytis thomasi (Collett, 1893)
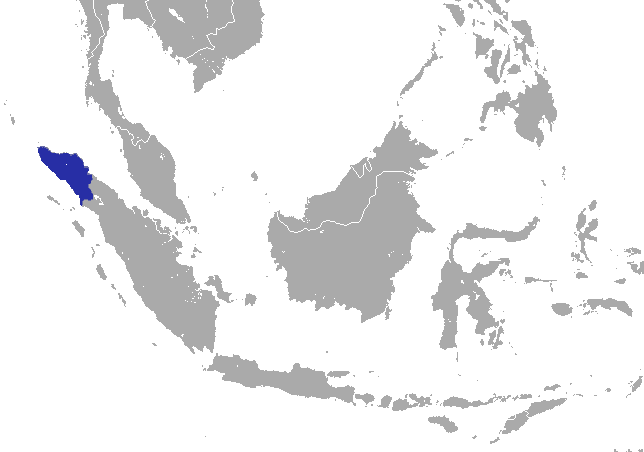
- Thomas's langur range

= Thomas's langur =

Species of Old World monkey

Thomas's langur (Presbytis thomasi), also known as the North Sumatran leaf monkey or Thomas's leaf monkey, is a species of primate in the family Cercopithecidae. It is endemic to northern Sumatra, Indonesia, not living to the south and east of Lake Toba and the Alas and Wampu rivers. Its natural habitat is subtropical or tropical dry forests. It is threatened by habitat loss. Its native names are reungkah in Acehnese and kedih in Alas. It can be found in Gunung Leuser National Park, where substantial populations exist in Ketambe and Bukit Lawang.

== Diet ==
Although primarily folivorous, Thomas's langur also eats fruit, flowers, and occasionally toadstools and snails. Like other members of the genus Presbytis, this species has evolved to digest cellulose, and microbes in the gut extract nutrients from leaves. Reflected in this diet of leaves is the extent to which they do consume fruit, which is usually unripe and with high pH levels to avoid killing the microbes they need to digest leaves. Thomas's langur also drinks from holes in trees where water collects or from small pools.

== Description ==
The hair on the top of the head rises in a crown, resembling a mohawk; this crown is white at the front with a dark grey stripe running down. Two tufts of fur extend on either side of its face. The belly is cream colored and the back of the animal is grey. It has amber eyes with grey outlines around the eyes. Juveniles have creamy white fur.

== Ecology ==
Thomas's langur is preyed upon by Sunda clouded leopards, Sumatran tigers, Asian golden cats and reticulated pythons, which are particularly dangerous to this species when they are on the ground. Thomas's langur disperses seeds and pollinates flowers of plants that they eat.

== Conservation ==
Due to the ongoing deforestation of the Leuser and Ulu Massen Ecosystems in Northern Sumatra, Thomas's langur is threatened with extinction. It is protected by Indonesian Law under Cites Appendix II and as Vulnerable by the IUCN. Although not as endangered as the charismatic megafauna it shares its habitat with, such as the critically endangered Sumatran orangutan and Sumatran elephant, the population of Thomas's langur has declined by thirty percent in the last few decades. As its habitat continues to erode due to human activity, it comes into conflict with people, moving into croplands where it becomes victim of the illegal pet trade and is seen as a pest by farmers, who cull them in large numbers with firearms. Like many other animals in SE Asia, Thomas's langur is also dismembered and its parts sold for medicine.

Although protected by Indonesian Law, Thomas's langur is becoming habituated to tourists who visit Gunung Leuser National Park. Though discouraged and prohibited, humans feed Thomas's langurs and other primates in the park causing negative consequences for wildlife and people. Thomas's langur lives twenty years in the wild, but twenty nine years in captivity. It is possible the lack of stress and predators found in their environment is responsible for the extended lifespan in captivity.

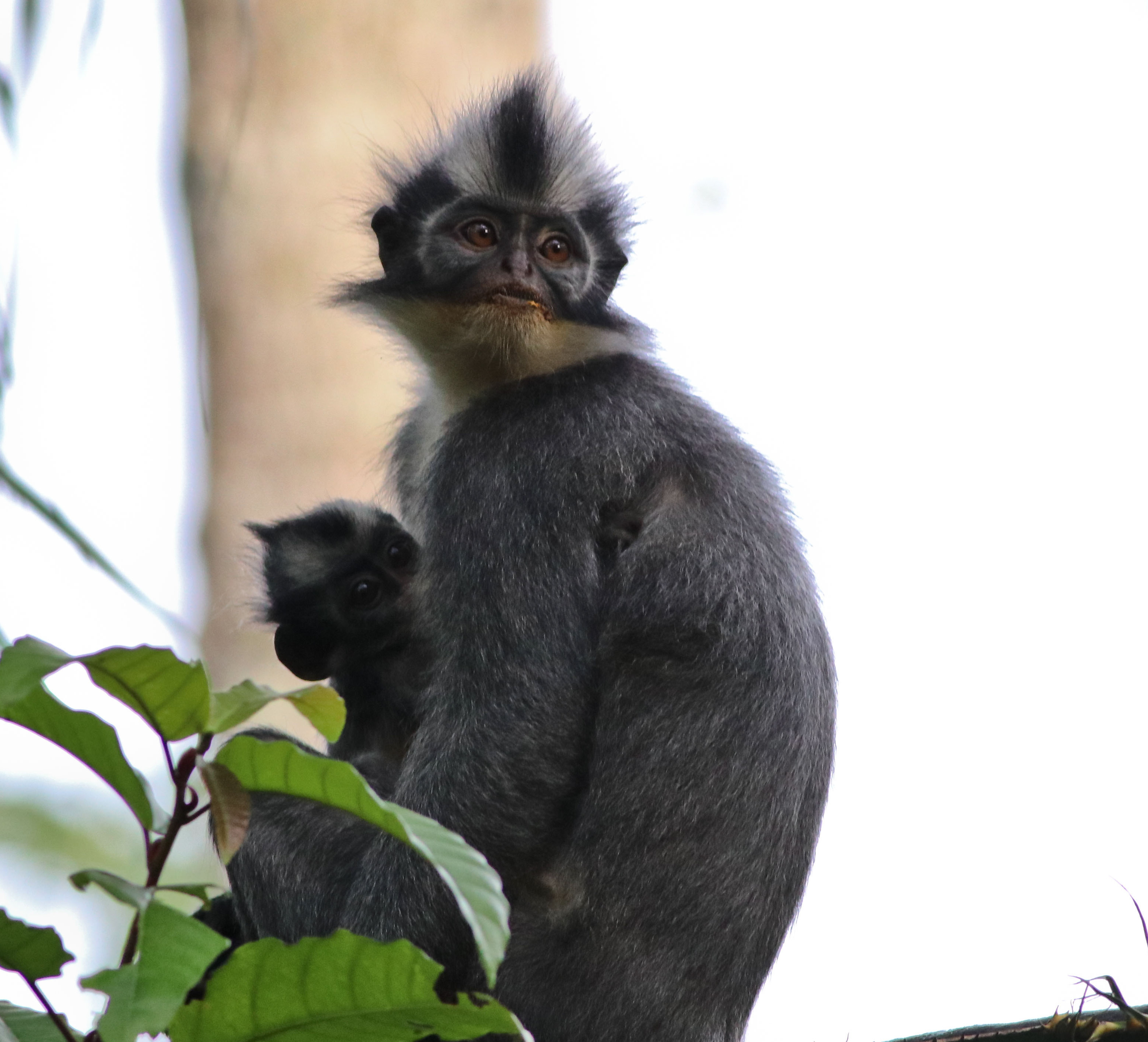
Thomas's langur (Presbytis thomasi) from Bukit Lawang, North Sumatra
