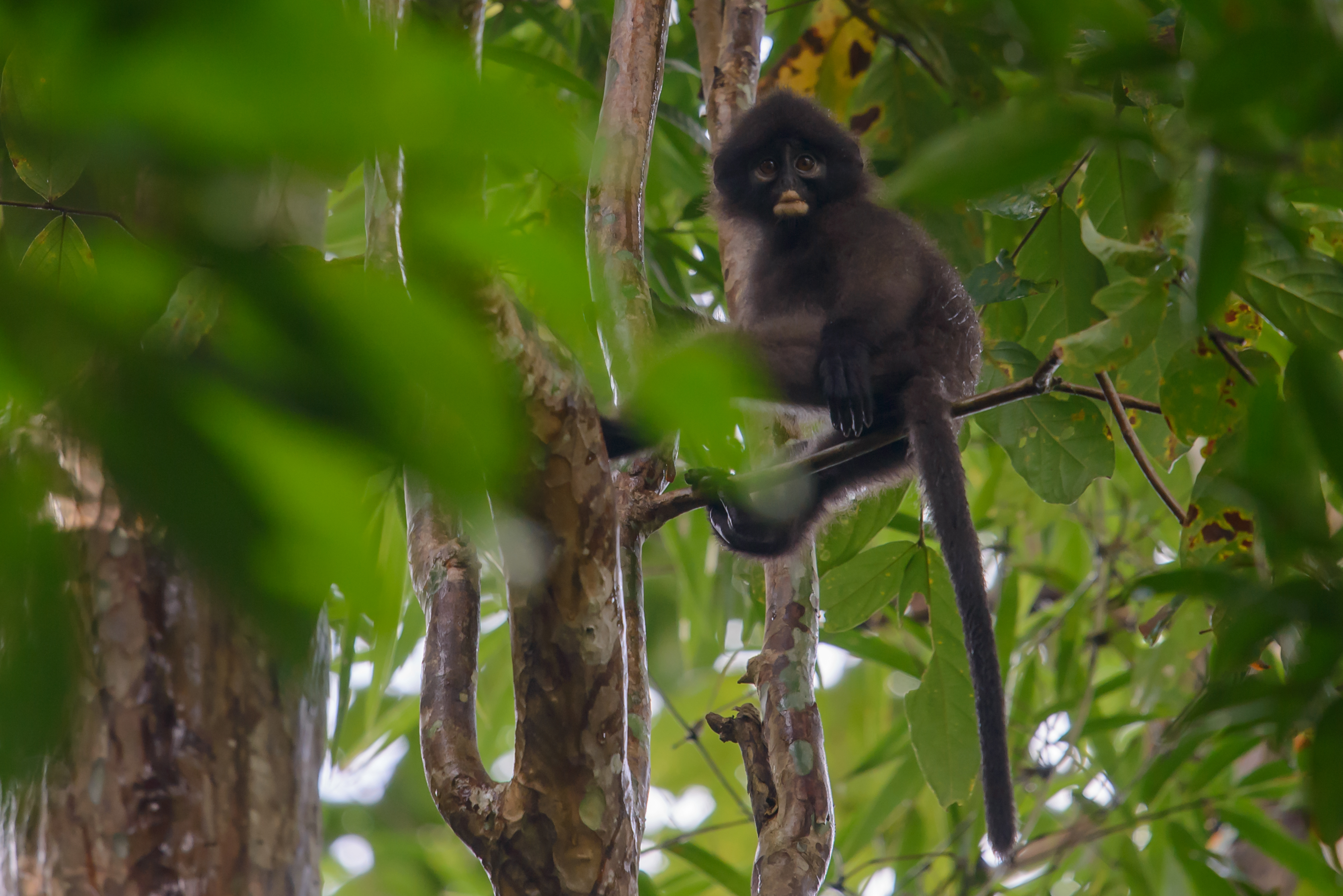
- Presbytis robinsoni in Khao Sok National Park

Conservation status
- Near Threatened (IUCN 3.1)

Scientific classification
- Kingdom: Animalia
- Phylum: Chordata
- Class: Mammalia
- Infraclass: Placentalia
- Order: Primates
- Family: Cercopithecidae
- Genus: Presbytis
- Species: P. robinsoni

Binomial name
- Presbytis robinsoni Thomas, 1910
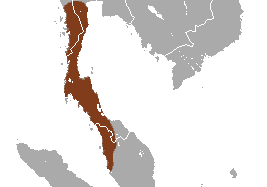
- Robinson's banded langur range in Malaysia, Thailand and Burma

= Robinson's banded langur =

Species of primate

Robinson's banded langur (Presbytis robinsoni), also known as Robinson's banded surili, is a species of monkey in the family Cercopithecidae. It was formerly considered a subspecies of the Raffles' banded langur Presbytis femoralis, but genetic analysis revealed that it is no more related to Raffles' banded langur than it is to several other Presbytis species. It lives in the northern Malay Peninsula, including southern Burma and Thailand. It is listed as near threatened by the IUCN.
