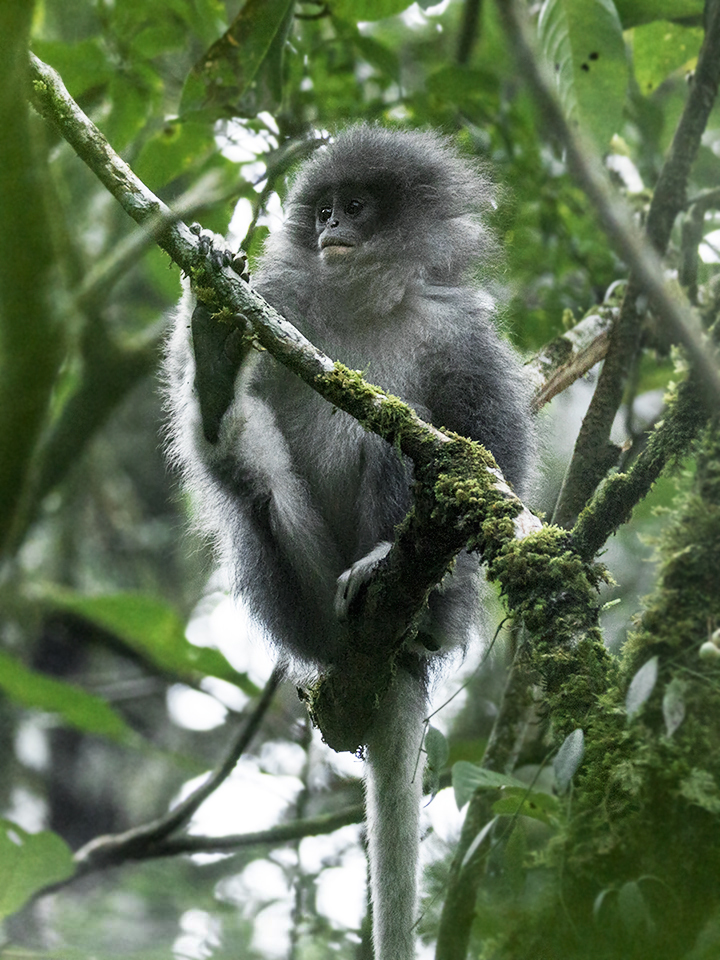
- Javan surili

Scientific classification
- Kingdom: Animalia
- Phylum: Chordata
- Class: Mammalia
- Infraclass: Placentalia
- Order: Primates
- Family: Cercopithecidae
- Subfamily: Colobinae
- Tribe: Presbytini
- Genus: Presbytis; Eschscholtz, 1821

Type species
- Presbytis mitrata Eschsholtz, 1821 (= Simia melalophos Raffles, 1821)

Species
- 11, see text

= Presbytis =

Genus of south-east Asian monkeys

Presbytis is a genus of Old World monkeys also known as langurs, leaf monkeys, or surilis. Members of the genus live in the Thai-Malay Peninsula, on Sumatra, Borneo, Java and smaller nearby islands.

== Description ==
Surilis are rather small, slimly built primates. Their fur at the top is brown, grey, black, or orange, and at the lower surface whitish or greyish, sometimes also orange, with some species having fur designs at the head or at the hips. Their German name of Mützenlanguren ("capped langurs") comes from the hair on their head, which forms a tuft. They differ from the other langurs by characteristics in the shape of their head (particularly the poorly developed or absent brow ridges, and the prominent nasal bones), in the teeth, and by the size of their small thumbs. Surilis range in adult length from 40 to 60 cm (with a 50- to 85-cm-long tail) and a weight of 5 to 8 kg.

== Behaviour ==
Diurnal forest dwellers, they spend nearly their entire lives in the trees. They live in groups of up to 21 animals (typically 10 or fewer animals in most species) consisting of a male, several females, and their young. A few species have been observed in monogamous pairings (particularly the Mentawai langur), although this might be a reaction to the decrease of their habitat. Lone males and all-male groups have also been reported. The groups are hierarchically developed, with intergroup communication that is both vocal and postural.

== Diet ==
The surilis' diet consists of leaves, fruits, and seeds.

== Breeding ==
Gestation time is 5–6 months, and births are typically of single young. Newborn animals are white colored and have a black strip at the back, although some have a cross-shaped mark. By one year old, the young are weaned and at an age of 4–5 years, they are fully mature. The typical life expectancy in the wild remains poorly known for most species, but captive Sumatran surilis have lived more than 18 years.

== Conservation ==
Several species in this genus are restricted to regions with extensive habitat destruction, and are also threatened by hunting. Consequently, 16 of the 19 species are rated as vulnerable or worse by IUCN, and the Sarawak surili has been referred to as "one of the rarest primates in the world." Recently, a subspecies of Hose's langur called Miller's grizzled langur, thought to be extinct, was rediscovered in the Wehea Forest on the eastern tip of Borneo island, though it remains one of the world's most endangered primates.

== Taxonomy ==
Two other genera, Trachypithecus and Semnopithecus, were formerly considered subgenera of Presbytis. The species-level taxonomy of Presbytis is complex, and significant changes have been proposed for several in recent years.

Genus Presbytis – Eschscholtz, 1821 – nineteen species
Common name	Scientific name and subspecies	Range	Size and ecology	IUCN status and estimated population
Black Sumatran langur	P. sumatrana (S. Müller & Schlegel, 1841)	Island of Sumatra in Indonesia	Size: 42–61 cm (17–24 in) long, plus 50–85 cm (20–33 in) tail Habitat: Forest Diet: Fruit, leaves, seeds and flowers	EN Unknown
Black-and-white langur	P. bicolor Aimi & Bakar, 1992	Island of Sumatra	Size: 42–61 cm (17–24 in) long, plus 50–85 cm (20–33 in) tail Habitat: Forest Diet: Fruit, seeds, and leaves	DD Unknown
Black-crested Sumatran langur	P. melalophos (Raffles, 1821)	Island of Sumatra	Size: 42–61 cm (17–24 in) long, plus 50–85 cm (20–33 in) tail Habitat: Forest and shrubland Diet: Fruits and leaves, as well as seeds and flowers	EN Unknown
East Sumatran banded langur	P. percura Lyon, 1908	Island of Sumatra	Size: 42–61 cm (17–24 in) long, plus 50–85 cm (20–33 in) tail Habitat: Forest Diet: Fruit, seeds, and leaves	CR Unknown
Hose's langur	P. hosei (Thomas, 1889)	Borneo	Size: 42–61 cm (17–24 in) long, plus 50–85 cm (20–33 in) tail Habitat: Forest Diet: Leaves, unripe fruits, seeds, flowers, bird eggs and nestlings	VU Unknown
Javan surili	P. comata (Desmarest, 1822) Two subspecies: P. c. comata; P. c. fredericae	Island of Java in Indonesia	Size: 42–61 cm (17–24 in) long, plus 50–85 cm (20–33 in) tail Habitat: Forest Diet: Leaves, as well as fruits, flowers, and seeds	VU 5,500
Maroon leaf monkey	P. rubicunda (S. Müller, 1838) Five subspecies: P. r. carimatae; P. r. chrysea; P. r. ignita; P. r. rubicunda; P. r. rubida	Borneo	Size: 42–61 cm (17–24 in) long, plus 50–85 cm (20–33 in) tail Habitat: Forest and inland wetlands Diet: Leaves, seeds, and fruit, as well as flowers and pith	VU Unknown
Siberut langur	P. siberu (Chasen & Kloss, 1928)	Island of Siberut in Indonesia	Size: 42–61 cm (17–24 in) long, plus 50–85 cm (20–33 in) tail Habitat: Forest Diet: Fruit, seeds, and leaves	EN Unknown
Mentawai langur	P. potenziani (Bonaparte, 1856)	Mentawai islands in Indonesia	Size: 42–61 cm (17–24 in) long, plus 50–85 cm (20–33 in) tail Habitat: Forest Diet: Fruit, seeds, and leaves	CR Unknown
Miller's langur	P. canicrus G. S. Miller, 1934	Eastern Borneo (in light green)	Size: 42–61 cm (17–24 in) long, plus 50–85 cm (20–33 in) tail Habitat: Forest Diet: Fruit, seeds, and leaves	EN Unknown
Mitered langur	P. mitrata Eschscholtz, 1821	Island of Sumatra	Size: 42–61 cm (17–24 in) long, plus 50–85 cm (20–33 in) tail Habitat: Forest Diet: Fruit, seeds, and leaves	VU Unknown
Natuna Island surili	P. natunae (Thomas & Hartert, 1894)	Island of Natuna Besar in Indonesia	Size: 42–61 cm (17–24 in) long, plus 50–85 cm (20–33 in) tail Habitat: Forest Diet: Fruit, seeds, and leaves	VU 9,000
Raffles' banded langur	P. femoralis (Martin, 1838)	Singapore and southern Peninsular Malaysia	Size: 42–61 cm (17–24 in) long, plus 50–85 cm (20–33 in) tail Habitat: Forest Diet: Fruit, seeds, and leaves	CR 200–250
Robinson's banded langur	P. robinsoni Thomas, 1910	Northern half of Malay Peninsula	Size: 42–61 cm (17–24 in) long, plus 50–85 cm (20–33 in) tail Habitat: Forest Diet: Fruit, seeds, and leaves	NT Unknown
Sabah grizzled langur	P. sabana (Thomas, 1893)	Eastern Borneo (in dark brown)	Size: 42–61 cm (17–24 in) long, plus 50–85 cm (20–33 in) tail Habitat: Forest Diet: Fruit, seeds, and leaves	EN Unknown
Sarawak surili	P. chrysomelas (S. Müller, 1838) Two subspecies: P. c. chrysomelas; P. c. cruciger	Northern Borneo	Size: 42–61 cm (17–24 in) long, plus 50–85 cm (20–33 in) tail Habitat: Forest Diet: Fruit, seeds, and leaves	CR Unknown
Thomas's langur	P. thomasi (Collett, 1893)	Northern island of Sumatra in Indonesia	Size: 42–62 cm (17–24 in) long, plus 50–85 cm (20–33 in) tail Habitat: Forest Diet: Fruit, leaves, and seeds, as well as flowers, bark, twigs, stalks, birds, bird eggs, algae, and insects	VU Unknown
White-fronted surili	P. frontata (S. Müller, 1838)	Borneo	Size: 42–61 cm (17–24 in) long, plus 50–85 cm (20–33 in) tail Habitat: Forest Diet: Fruit, seeds, and leaves	VU Unknown
White-thighed surili	P. siamensis (S. Müller & Schlegel, 1838) Four subspecies: P. s. cana; P. s. paenulata; P. s. rhionis; P. s. siamensis	Southeastern Asia	Size: 42–61 cm (17–24 in) long, plus 50–85 cm (20–33 in) tail Habitat: Forest Diet: Fruit, seeds, and leaves	NT Unknown

== Sources ==
- Nowak, Ronald M. (1999). Walker's Mammals of the World. Vol. 1. Johns Hopkins University Press. ISBN 978-0-8018-5789-8.
