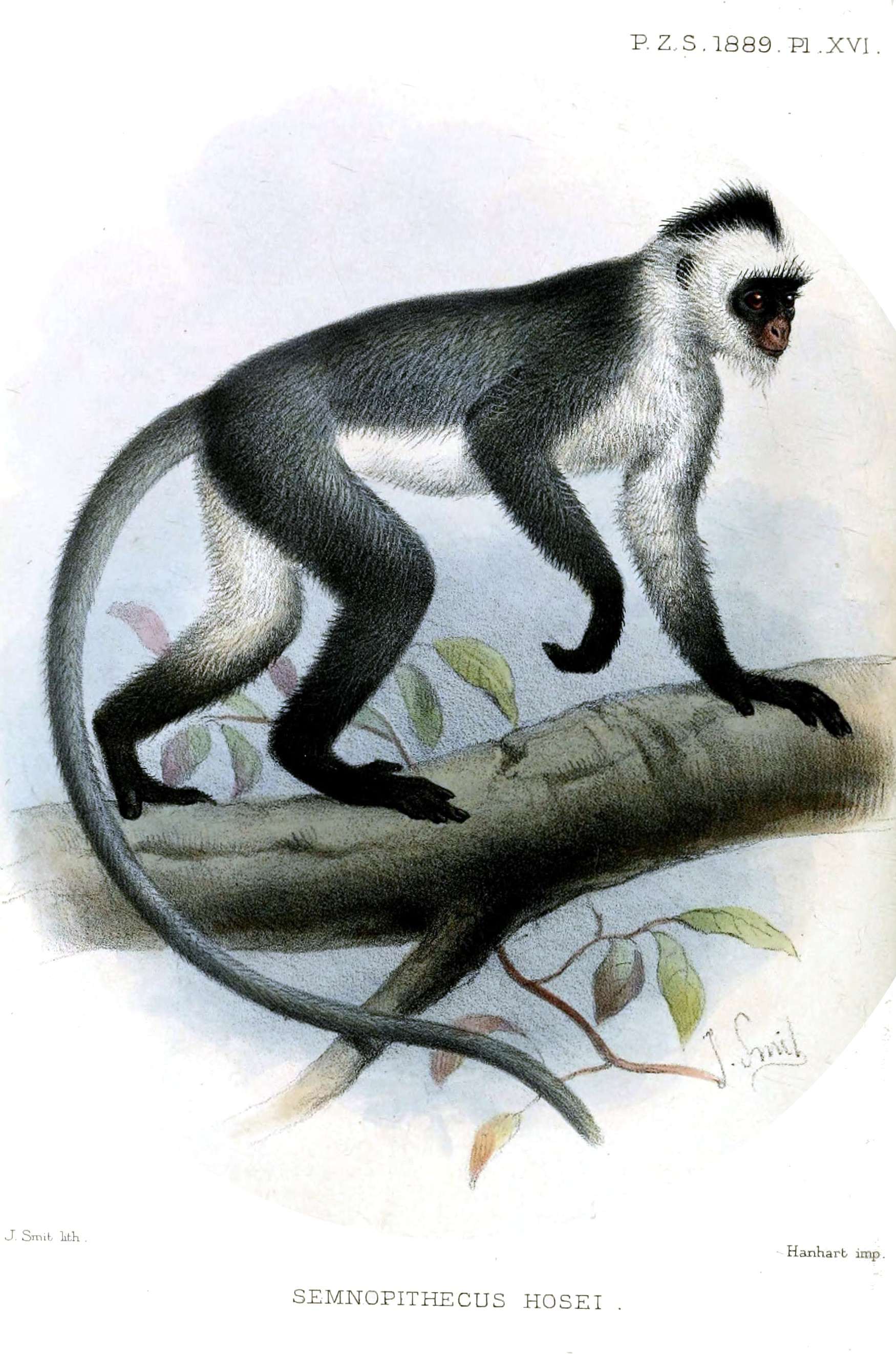

Conservation status
- Vulnerable (IUCN 3.1)

Scientific classification
- Kingdom: Animalia
- Phylum: Chordata
- Class: Mammalia
- Order: Primates
- Family: Cercopithecidae
- Genus: Presbytis
- Species: P. hosei

Binomial name
- Presbytis hosei (Thomas, 1889)
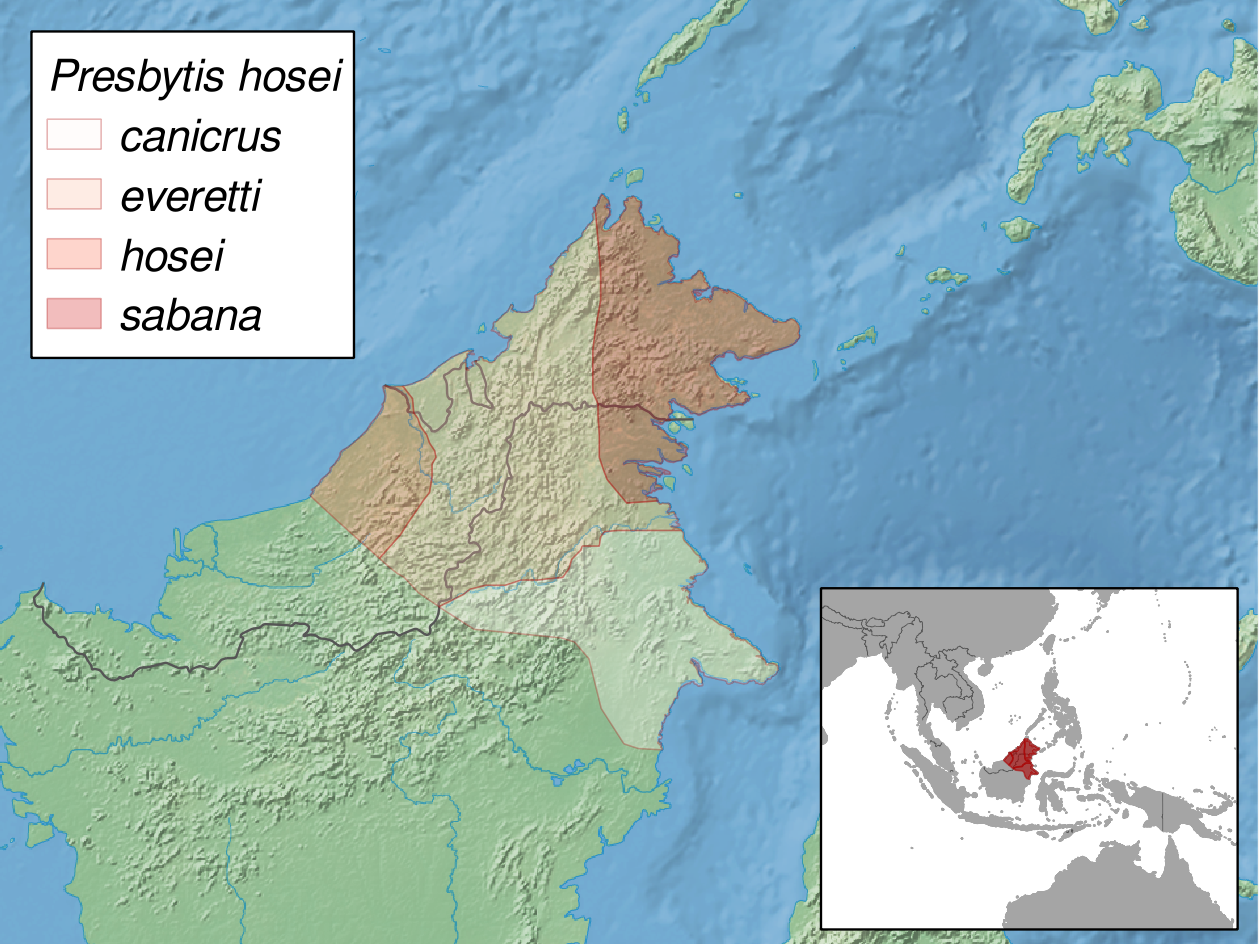
- After taxonomic revisions, the remaining range for Hose's langur is that shown as P. h. hosei and P. h. everetti

= Hose's langur =

Species of Old World monkey

Hose's langur (Presbytis hosei) is a species of primate in the family Cercopithecidae endemic to the island of Borneo, including Brunei, Kalimantan (Indonesia), and East Malaysia. Its natural habitat is subtropical or tropical dry forests. It is threatened by habitat loss. It was first identified in Kutai National Park and Sangkulirang Peninsula, East Kalimantan, Indonesia, in 1985.

Miller's langur (P. canicrus) and the Saban grizzled langur (P. sabana) were previously considered subspecies of Hose's langur. There used to also be two additional forms that were considered separate subspecies, P. h. hosei and P. h. everetti. However, P. h. everetti is no longer considered to be a separate subspecies as the original identification of it as a separate subspecies appears to be the result of comparing a subadult female with an adult male.

== Habitat ==
Hose's langur is commonly found in the northern and eastern regions of Malaysia as well as the northern part of Borneo. They are most likely to be found in coastal regions with forests. These forests regions called dipterocarp forests are known for their tall trees, in which the Hose's langur spends its entire life. The Hose's langur's territory is small spanning no larger than 0.14 square miles. It has been observed that they rarely leave this small area.

== Appearance ==
Hose's langur has grey-ish fur all over their bodies except for white tuffs of fur on their head that forms a point at the top of the head and points on either sides of their face. Also, their grey-ish fur turns a darker shade then into black fur on their backs, hands, feet and on their face. The black fur forms a "bandit mask" over their pink skin, much like a raccoon.

== Diet ==
Hose's langur primarily eat leaves but have been observed to sometimes eat fruits. Because of their high cellulose diet, they have a four chambered stomach, similar to a cow, giving them a "pot-belly" like body shape. They also have been observed in rare occasions to climb down from the canopy of the forest to eat mud at mineral springs. When they eat this mud its minerals form what's called a bezoar stones in their stomachs. In some cultures, these stones are believed to have a medicinal effect for humans.

== Behavior ==
Hose's langur is active during the day and sleeps at night. They spend most of the time in trees around the middle canopy area around 20 meters, but sometimes travel higher or lower. They rarely go to the ground, only doing so during times with little rain to drink what they kind find.

== Group Dynamics ==
Hose's langur live in groups averaging of 6 members, primarily led by one male, the rest are females. They have been observed to be not very social, keeping to their territories and groups. They do not travel very far, as stated before, they keep to their territory in the forest like other species of langurs.

=== Communication ===
Alarm-like calls are sounded when humans, predators, other langurs or any animal enters their territory. That these calls are simple warnings is shown as the Hose's langur has been observed to hide and run when they are used.

== Ecological Role ==
Not much is known or has been observed of the langurs ecological role, but scientists assume the role of these langur to possibly be ecosystem engineers. They assume this because like other leaf eating monkeys, when they eat leaves, the slight opening of the canopy could let sunlight down further in the forest.

== Threatened extinction ==
In 1996, Hose's langurs of East Kalimantan, Indonesia, were among the most common primates in the area. In 2003, their population densities have decreased by 50–80%. The sudden drop in population arises from the rising demand for its bezoar stones and to prevent crop raiding, and the rapid deforestation and removal of the primate's habitat.

Densities of Hose's langurs positively correlate with tree height, height of the first bough, tree diameter, and canopy cover, and negatively with vegetation cover at low and ground level. With the constant deforestation and destruction of its habitat, Hose's langurs continue to lose their habitat. Every known area in which the primate resides has been affected severely, with the exception of the innermost areas of forests that have been relatively untouched by humans.
