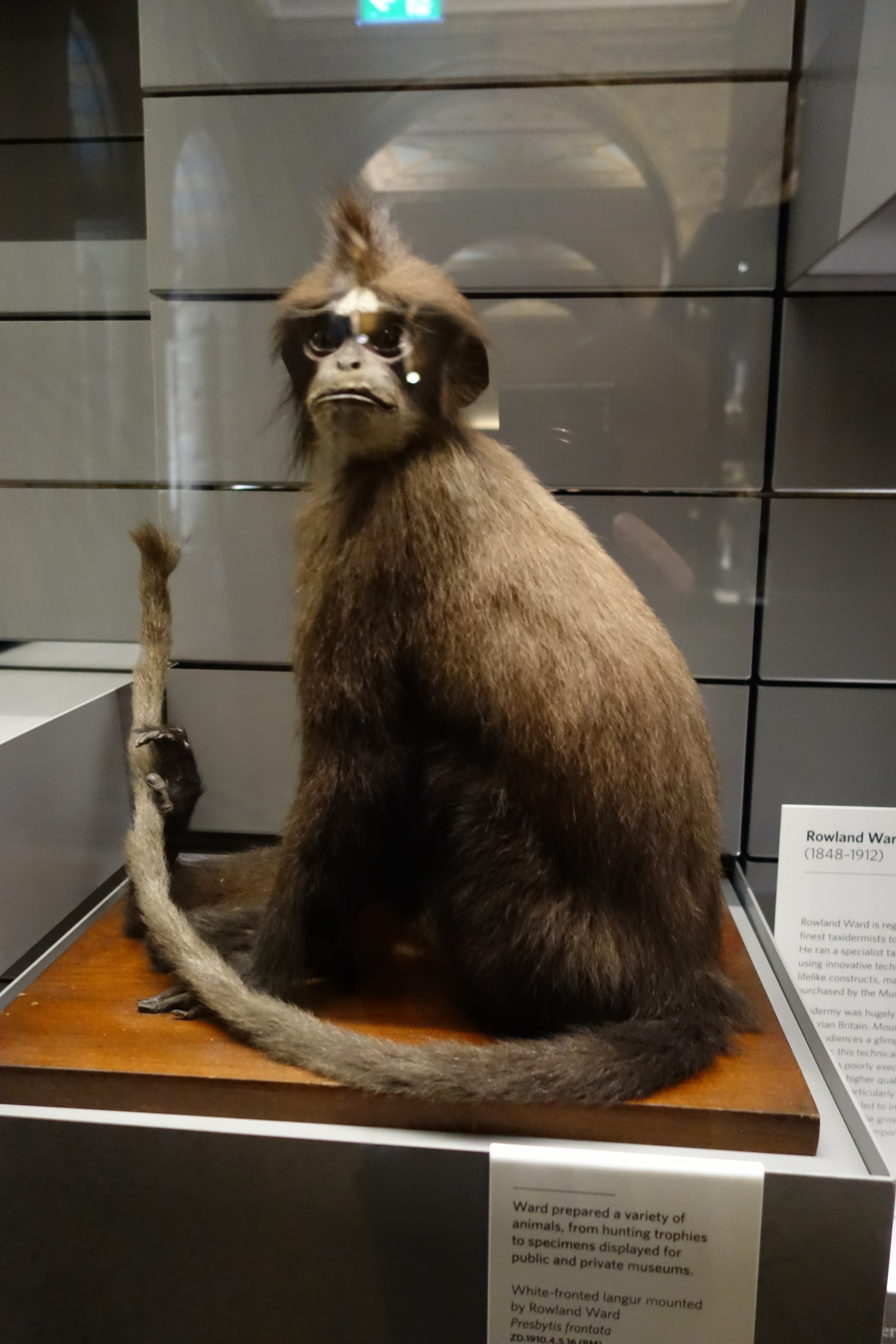

Conservation status
- Vulnerable (IUCN 3.1)

Scientific classification
- Kingdom: Animalia
- Phylum: Chordata
- Class: Mammalia
- Infraclass: Placentalia
- Order: Primates
- Family: Cercopithecidae
- Genus: Presbytis
- Species: P. frontata

Binomial name
- Presbytis frontata (S. Müller, 1838)
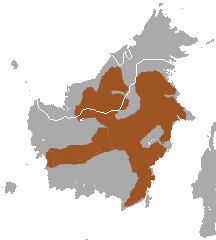
- White-fronted surili range

Synonyms
- nudifrons Elliot, 1909

= White-fronted surili =

Species of Old World monkey

The white-fronted surili (Presbytis frontata) is a species of primate in the family Cercopithecidae, the Old World monkeys. It is endemic to the large international island of Borneo, in Indonesia, Malaysia, and possibly Brunei.

Its body is mainly grey-brown, with a distinct white spot on the forehead. Its chin and lower cheeks are greyish. Its natural habitat is subtropical or tropical dry forests. It is threatened by habitat loss.

== Physical characteristics ==
The white-fronted surili has a tall sagittal crest that leans forward. This species' dorsal body is mainly greyish brown and ventral side is yellowish brown in coloration, with a distinct white spot on the forehead. The tail is yellowish grey, with blackish coloration of hands, feet, brow, crown crest and cheeks. There is light colored frontal patch on the crown crest. This species has a sacculated stomach to assist in the breakdown of cellulose and also has enlarged salivary glands. The incisors are narrow and the molars have a sharp, high crest. The jaw is deep and the face is short and broad. The thumb is reduced and the hindlimbs are longer than the forelimbs. The average body mass for the adult male is 5.67 kg and for adult females is 5.56 kg.

There are two subspecies, P. f. frontata and P. f. nudifrons. P. f. frontata is brownish in colour, with darker arms, legs, top and sides of the head and tail. The chin and lower cheeks are greyish. The white spot on the forehead is roughly triangular in shape. P. f. nudifrons is dark greyish with blackish hands, feet and base of tail. The underparts and the distal end of the tail are paler grey-brown and the throat is white. The white spot on the forehead is rather square compared to P. f. frontata and is divided by a vertical line of short black hairs.

== Ecology and habitat ==
This species is diurnal and arboreal. It is also primarily a folivorous species, but also consumes fruits and seeds. This species prefers to eat immature leaves to more mature ones. The group sizes range from 10 to 15 individuals. P. frontata can be found in tall lowland and hill dipterocarp forests, not above 300 meters. This species has also been observed in riverine and hill forest.

== Distribution ==
P. frontata is endemic to Borneo, and restricted to the south-east of Borneo, below 3°N and east of Barito River. It was recorded in the east between the Kayan River and Banjarmasin in the south. Meanwhile, P. f. nudifrons was recorded from central Sarawak between the upper Rajang River and upper Batang Lupar, including Lanjak Entimau Wildlife Sanctuary.

== Social behaviour and communication ==
The white-fronted surili moves through the forest quadrupedally. This species also moves through the forest by leaping. In the population, solitary males have been observed in this species. For communication, the males use loud calls to demarcate the group's territory. There is also tactile communication, which is social grooming. This is when one individuals groom another to reinforce the bonds between individuals. For reproduction, they only give birth to a single offspring.

== Threats and conservation ==
This species is listed as vulnerable because the population trends are decreasing to more than 30% over the last three generation (approximately 30 years). This is due to the hunting for the meat and traditional medicine, as well as habitat loss. The forest habitat is being loss rapidly, especially due to oil palm plantations and other anthropogenic habitats. For conservation, this species is protected Indonesian law and is totally protected in Sarawak. There are at least seven protected areas known, which only one in Malaysia, Lanjak-Entimau Wildlife Sanctuary.
