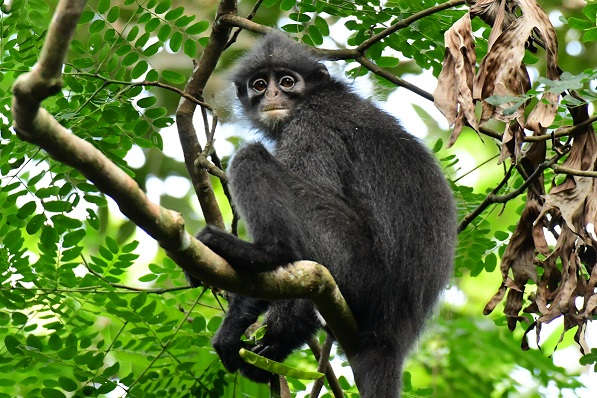
- Presbytis femoralis in Singapore

Conservation status
- Critically Endangered (IUCN 3.1)

Scientific classification
- Kingdom: Animalia
- Phylum: Chordata
- Class: Mammalia
- Order: Primates
- Family: Cercopithecidae
- Genus: Presbytis
- Species: P. femoralis

Binomial name
- Presbytis femoralis (Martin, 1838)
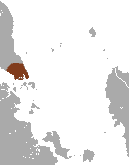
- Raffles' banded langur range in Singapore and Johor, Malaysia

= Raffles' banded langur =

Species of primate

The Raffles' banded langur (Presbytis femoralis), also known as the banded leaf monkey or banded surili, is a species of primate in the family Cercopithecidae. It is endemic to Singapore and southern peninsular Malaysia. The species underwent taxonomic revisions in 2019 and 2020, in which two former subspecies were elevated to separate species. As a result, the Raffles' banded langur meets the criteria for being listed as critically endangered by the IUCN. It is mainly threatened by habitat loss.

== Taxonomy ==
The taxonomy of Presbytis femoralis underwent several changes. Up until 2019, three subspecies of P. femoralis were recognized: P. f. femoralis (nominate), P. f. percura (the East Sumatran banded langur), and P. f. robinsoni (Robinson's banded langur). Presbytis f. femoralis lives in Singapore, and in the states of Johor and Pahang of southern Peninsular Malaysia, P. f. robinsoni lives in the northern Malay Peninsula, including southern Myanmar and Thailand, and P. f. percura lives in east-central Sumatra.

Genetic data suggested that at least P. f. femoralis and P. f. robinsoni were different species, which was also in agreement with their morphological characters. However, resolving all subspecies-level boundaries within banded langurs required data for P. f. percura, which was the least studied among them. Most recently, mitochondrial genomes were obtained for P. f. percura, and based on multiple species delimitation algorithms (PTP, ABGD, Objective Clustering) applied to a dataset covering 39 species and 43 subspecies of Asian colobines, all three subspecies of banded langurs were resurrected to species.

William Charles Linnaeus Martin formally described P. femoralis based on material that had been collected by Sir Stamford Raffles in Singapore. Martin had given the distribution as "Sumatra etc.", not mentioning Singapore explicitly, resulting in some confusion over the actual type locality. Gerrit Smith Miller Jr. resolved the issue in 1934, determining that Singapore was the actual type locality.

== Description ==
The Raffles' banded langur is 43.2 to 61.0 cm (17.0 to 24.0 in) long, excluding the tail, with a tail length of 61.0 to 83.8 cm (24.0 to 33.0 in). It weighs 5.9 to 8.2 kg (13 to 18 lb). It has dark fur on the back and sides with white-colored fur forming a band on the chest and along the inner thighs.

== Habits ==
The Raffles' banded langur is diurnal and arboreal, preferring rainforest with trees of the family Dipterocarpaceae. It comes to the ground less frequently than most other leaf monkeys. It lives in both primary and secondary forest, and also in swamp forests and mangrove forests, and even in rubber plantations. It moves primarily by walking on all fours and by leaping.

According to wildlife researcher Charles Francis, it typically lives in groups of 3 to 6. However, a study in Perawang, Sumatra found an average group size of 11 monkeys in mixed-sex groups. The latter study also found an average ratio of 1 adult male to 4.8 adult females in mixed-sex groups and a ratio of 1.25 adult monkeys for every immature monkey in mixed-sex groups. It also found an average range size for a group of 22 ha (54 acres), and an average population density of 42 per square kilometre (110/sq mi). Other studies found somewhat smaller home ranges, of between 9 and 21 ha (22 and 52 acres).

The Raffles' banded langur appears to have two birth seasons, once between June and July and another between December and January. In this study, at least six infants were born between 2008 and 2010, and the authors found low infant mortality, with several infants surviving to at least seven months old. The study also found that the infant coloration of the Singapore population is indistinguishable from that of the Johor, Malaysia population, with infants having white fur with a black stripe down the back from the head to the tail, crossed by another black stripe across the shoulders and to the forearms. Males leave their natal group before reaching maturity, at about 4 years old.

The call of mature males sounds like "ke-ke-ke." Mammalogist Ronald M. Nowak described the species' alarm call as "a harsh rattle followed by a loud chak-chak-chak-chak."

Raffles' banded langurs have occasionally been observed being groomed by long-tailed macaques.

== Diet ==
The Raffles' banded langur has a primarily vegetarian diet. Specialized bacteria in its gut allow it to digest leaves and unripe fruit. The Perawang study found that nearly 60% of the diet consisted of fruits and seeds. Another 30% consisted of leaves, primarily young leaves. A different study found that fruit made up 49% of the diet. Unlike some other monkeys, such as the long-tailed macaque, the banded langur destroys the seeds it eats, and thus is not a significant factor in dispersing seeds.

== Conservation status ==
The IUCN assessed Presbytis femoralis as being critically endangered in 2021. At the time they assessed the (then) subspecies P. f. femoralis as vulnerable. After the taxonomic reassessment, there are only about 300–400 Raffles' banded langurs remaining—about 250 to 300 and possibly fewer in peninsular Malaysia and about 60 in Singapore. As a result of the small, fragmented population and continuing risk of further deforestation, the species meets the criteria to be listed as critically endangered by IUCN.

=== Singapore population ===
The Raffles' banded langur was once common throughout the island of Singapore but that population is now listed as critically endangered, with approximately 60 individuals left in the Central Catchment Nature Reserve. The species was formerly found in the Bukit Timah Nature Reserve, but that population died out in 1987. The last individual to live in Bukit Timah is now displayed at the Raffles Museum of Biodiversity Research. The Central Catchment population had declined to as few as 10–15 monkeys before recovering to about 40 by 2012, 60 by 2019, and about 70 by 2022.

The Singapore population feeds from at least 27 plant species, including Hevea brasiliensis leaves, Adinandra dumosa flowers and Nephelium lappaceum fruits. They appear to prefer specific fruits and will travel long distances to reach their preferred fruit, rather than settle for more accessible foods. The National Biodiversity Centre, in partnership with the Evolution Lab of the National University of Singapore, launched an ecological study to determine suitable conservation strategies. A 2012 study found extremely low genetic diversity within the remaining Singapore population and suggested that translocation of Raffles' banded langurs from Malaysia may be necessary to provide the Singapore population with enough genetic diversity to survive in the long run. In 2016, a cross-border partnership between Singapore and Malaysia was formed with the establishment of a Raffles' Banded Langur Working Group funded by the Wildlife Reserves Singapore Conservation Fund.

The main threat to the Singapore population appears to be habitat loss. 99.8% of Singapore's original primary forest, including much of its dipterocarp flora, has been eliminated, with less than 200 ha remaining, primarily in Bukit Timah and the MacRitchie Reservoir and Nee Soon Swamp Forest portions of Central Catchment. The Nee Soon Swamp Forest is the primary area of Central Catchment where the Raffles' banded langur is found. The monkey groups inhabit forest fragments that have limited arboreal connections to other fragments. Other contributors to the species' decline in Singapore have been hunting for food and the pet trade. The species has been legally protected in Singapore since 1947. The Singapore government hopes that the development of Thomson Nature Park near Central Catchment will help maintain the Raffles' banded langur population, since it is located near a traditional feeding area for the monkeys and will increase the forested area they can use. Rope bridges are being used to facilitate movements between Central Catchment and nearby forest patches. The government also hopes that eventually when the vegetation matures the Eco-Link@BKE will allow banded leaf monkeys to repopulate Bukit Timah.

A group of bachelor males once tried to make its way to Bukit Timah without using the EcoLink, but one was killed while crossing the highway. The group now lives in Windsor Nature Park. In April 2021, a single Raffles' banded langur was observed in Dairy Farm Nature Park near Bukit Timah, but it is unclear whether it used the Eco-Link@BKE to get there. The National Parks Board staff wrote of the sighting at the website of the Lee Kong Chian Natural History Museum. Camera traps showed m two langurs within Eco-Link@BKE in October 2023. A male Raffles banded langur was sighted in Bukit Timah in July 2026, the first sigbting within the park in 40 years. It is not clear if the monkey arrived at Bukit Timah through Eco-Link@BKE or Rifle Range Flyover. Concerns have been raised as to whether construction of the Cross Island MRT line through Central Catchment may adversely impact the Raffles' banded langur population in the area.

In late 2019 to early 2020, a group of two dusky leaf monkeys was observed in Singapore, possibly having swum from Johor, and they were able to chase away a group of eleven Raffles' banded langurs that had been feeding on Adenanthera pavonina seeds. If more individuals arrive in Singapore, researchers are concerned that these primates can increase competition for resources, like vegetation, and transfer diseases to other native species that are not equipped to recover from them. They might even be able to outcompete the banded langurs.
