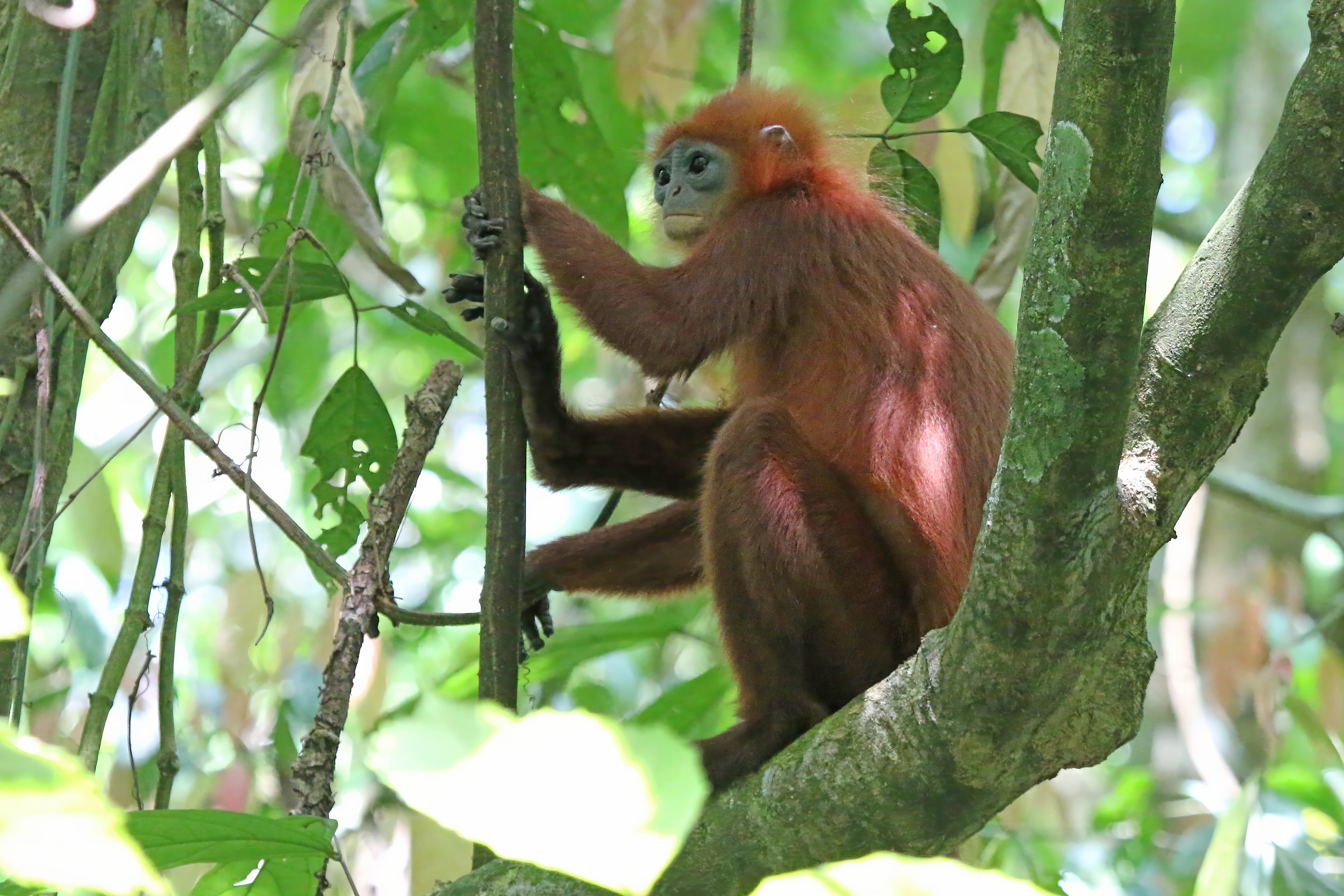
- Gomantong, Borneo

Conservation status
- Vulnerable (IUCN 3.1)

Scientific classification
- Kingdom: Animalia
- Phylum: Chordata
- Class: Mammalia
- Infraclass: Placentalia
- Order: Primates
- Family: Cercopithecidae
- Genus: Presbytis
- Species: P. rubicunda

Binomial name
- Presbytis rubicunda (S. Müller, 1838)
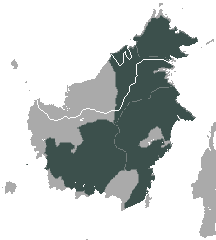
- Maroon leaf monkey range

= Maroon leaf monkey =

Species of Old World monkey

The maroon langur, maroon leaf monkey, or red leaf monkey (Presbytis rubicunda) is a member of the family Cercopithecidae. It is found on the southeast Asian island of Borneo and the nearby smaller Karimata. P. rubicunda mostly live in forests at altitudes below 2,000 m. They feed on leaves, seeds, and fruits.

== Ecology ==
=== Distribution and habitat ===
Maroon leaf monkeys (Presbytis rubicunda) are endemic to the island of Borneo in Southeast Asia. Their habitat is dense dipterocarp evergreen forest.

Borneo has a healthy tropical rainforest. It also contains shallow swampy areas made up of acidic, decomposed plant matter. These swampy areas have seasonal bouts of dry weather; during the wet season the rivers rise around two meters. Maroon leaf monkeys are arboreal primates and spend most of their time in the canopy. They have a large home ranges and low population densities compared to other primates. This is believed to be because they rely on specific trees which are rare and widely dispersed.

=== Diet ===
Maroon leaf monkeys are herbivores. Their main diet is fruits, seeds, young leaves, and flowers. They are selective feeders, as food becomes limited they will feed on certain types of plant matter or seeds during their time of abundance. To maintain a balance in their diet, they will consume topsoil from termite mounds.

Their primary food is the young parts of leaves, feeding less frequently on seeds and whole fruits, and occasionally on flowers. Feeding patterns vary seasonally. As the fruit season peaks during June to September, there is an increase of fruit being produced. During this time of abundance, Maroon leaf monkeys feed on large amounts of seeds and fruits. Consumption of young leaves happens primarily from October to June; especially in June. During this dry time of the year, they consume more succulent foliage and are decrease their intake of seeds. Flowers are mostly consumed between March and May. There is only one type of flower that becomes a high-demand resource during December. Food becomes scarce during the rainy season, and at this time of year maroon leaf monkeys feed on mature leaves.

During April, June, and August, maroon leaf monkeys consume the topsoil of termite mounds to obtain the minerals needed for a balanced diet. The termite mound soil has high levels of calcium and magnesium and is also a source of potassium and phosphorus. This soil is very acidic and has a dominant exchange of cations, due to the leaching of aluminium. This may be due to the termite's saliva, since termite soil has a higher nutrient content than the surrounding bed soil.

== Physiology ==
Because maroon leaf monkeys are from Southeast Asia, they must endure scarcity of fruit due to the unpredictable fruiting season. They spend around half their time eating leafy greens and the other half eating seeds and fruits. They favor the highly digestible leaves, which have a relatively low level of fiber. They combine young leaves with flowers that have high levels of protein. Fruits and seeds have a high concentration of fats and carbohydrates. Maroon leaf monkeys only eat from rare trees and lianas. They must rely on fallback resources when their usual food is not abundant. During 25-month (May to October) observation study maroon leaf monkeys spent "46 percent of their feeding time on young leaves, 38 percent on seeds, 12 percent on whole fruits, 2 percent on flowers, 1.0 percent on bark, and 1.2 percent on pith."

The Danum Valley of eastern Sabah, northern Borneo, had a rainfall of 3,115 millimetres (122.6 in) between the year 2007 and 2008, with temperature ranging from 31.4 °C (88.5 °F) to 22.5 °C (72.5 °F), with a mean of almost 27 °C (81 °F). Only seven of the twenty available species are consumed. When seeds and fruits are abundant, the monkeys spent most of their feeding time eating. During the time that they must use fallback resources, they feed on young leaves of Spatholobus macropterus for 28 percent of their feeding time, concentrating on those with more protein. Maroon leaf monkeys feed on different types of leaves according to their abundance. When there more fruits are available, they increase their time feeding on seeds around 28 percent.
