= United States Fish and Wildlife Service list of endangered mammals and birds =

Endangered species list

This is a list of the bird and mammal species and subspecies described as endangered by the United States Fish and Wildlife Service. It contains species and subspecies not only in the U.S. and its territories, but also those only found in other parts of the world. It does not include endangered fish, amphibians, reptiles, plants, or invertebrates. The complete list can be found in the U.S. Code of Federal Regulations Title 50 Part 17.

The listings for status are E for endangered or T for threatened. Species or subspecies may also be endangered or threatened because they are sufficiently similar in appearance to endangered or threatened species or subspecies and are marked for "similarity of appearance" as E(S/A) or T(S/A).

Threatened species are animals and plants that are likely to become endangered in the foreseeable future.

Identifying, protecting, and restoring endangered and threatened species and subspecies are the primary objectives of the U.S. Fish and Wildlife Service's endangered species program.

== Mammals ==
Common name	Scientific name	Home range	status
Lowland anoa	Bubalus depressicornis	Indonesia	E
Mountain anoa	Bubalus quarlesi	Indonesia	E
Giant sable antelope	Hippotragus niger variani	Angola	E
Argali	Ovis ammon	Eurasia	E
Giant armadillo	Priodontes maximus	South America	E
Pink fairy armadillo	Chlamyphorus truncatus	Argentina	E
African wild ass	Equus africanus	Somalia, Sudan, Ethiopia	E
Asian wild ass (onager)	Equus hemionus	Southwestern and Central Asia	E
Avahi (woolly lemur)	Avahi sp.	Malagasy Republic (Madagascar)	E
Aye-aye	Daubentonia madagascariensis	Malagasy Republic (Madagascar)	E
Babirusa	Babyrousa babyrussa	Indonesia	E
Gelada	Theropithecus gelada	Ethiopia	T
Western barred bandicoot	Perameles bougainville	Australia	E
Desert bandicoot	Perameles eremiana	Australia	E
Lesser rabbit bandicoot (lesser bilby)	Macrotis leucura	Australia	E
Pig-footed bandicoot	Chaeropus ecaudatus	Australia	E
Rabbit bandicoot (bilby)	Macrotis lagotis	Australia	E
Banteng	Bos javanicus	Southeast Asia	E
Bulmer's fruit bat (flying fox)	Aproteles bulmerae	Papua New Guinea	E
Bumblebee bat	Craseonycteris thonglongyai	Thailand	E
Gray bat	Myotis grisescens	Central and southeastern U.S.	E
Hawaiian hoary bat	Lasiurus cinereus semotus	U.S. (HI)	E
Indiana bat	Myotis sodalis	Eastern and Midwestern U.S.	E
Northern long-eared bat	Myotis septentrionalis	Eastern U.S., Canada	T
Lesser long-nosed bat	Leptonycteris curasoae yerbabuenae	U.S. (AZ, NM), Mexico, Central America	E
Little Mariana fruit bat	Pteropus tokudae	Western Pacific Ocean, U.S. (Guam)	E
Mariana fruit bat (Mariana flying fox)	Pteropus mariannus	Western Pacific Ocean, U.S. (GU, MP)	T
Mexican long-nosed bat (Saussure's long-nosed bat)	Leptonycteris nivalis	U.S. (NM, TX), Mexico, Central America	E
Ozark big-eared bat	Corynorhinus (Plecotus) townsendii ingens	U.S. (MO, OK, AR)	E
Rodrigues fruit bat (flying fox)	Pteropus rodricensis	Indian Ocean, Rodrigues Island	E
Singapore roundleaf horseshoe bat	Hipposideros ridleyi	Malaysia	E
Virginia big-eared bat	Corynorhinus (Plecotus) townsendii virginianus	U.S. (KS, FL, TX, OK)	E
Florida bonneted bat	Eumops floridanus	U.S. (FL)	E
American black bear	Ursus americanus	North America	T(S/A)
Baluchistan bear	Ursus thibetanus gedrosianus	Iran, Pakistan	E
Brown bear	Ursus arctos arctos	Palearctic	E
Blue bear	Ursus arctos pruinosus	China (Tibet)	E
Grizzly bear	Ursus arctos horribilis	Holarctic	T
Louisiana black bear	Ursus americanus luteolus	U.S. (LA-all parishes; MS-all counties south of or touching a line from Greenville, Washington County, to Meridian, Lauderdale County; TX-all counties east of or touching a line from Linden, Cass County, SW to Bryan, Brazos County, thence SSW to Rockport, Aransas County)	T
Mexican grizzly bear	Ursus arctos	Holarctic	E
Beaver	Castor fiber birulai	Mongolia	E
Wood bison	Bison bison athabascae	Canada, northwestern U.S.	E
Mexican bobcat	Lynx rufus escuinapae	Central Mexico	E
Bontebok	Damaliscus pygarus (dorcas) dorcas	South Africa	E
Bactrian camel	Camelus bactrianus	Mongolia, China	E
Woodland caribou (reindeer)	Rangifer tarandus caribou	U.S. (AK, ID, ME, MI, MN, MT, NH, VT, WA, WI), Canada	E
Andean mountain cat	Leopardus jacobitus	Chile, Peru, Bolivia, Argentina	E
Asian golden cat (Temmnick's cat)	Catopuma temminckii	Nepal, China, Southeast Asia, Indonesia (Sumatra)	E
Black-footed cat	Felis nigripes	Southern Africa	E
Flat-headed cat	Prionailurus planiceps	Malaysia, Indonesia	E
Iriomote cat	Prionailurus iriomotensis	Japan (Iriomote Island, Ryukyu Islands)	E
Leopard cat	Prionailurus bengalensis	India, Southeast Asia	E
Marbled cat	Pardofelis marmorata	Nepal, Southeast Asia, Indonesia	E
Pakistan sand cat	Felis margarita scheffeli	Pakistan	E
Oncilla	Leopardus tigrinus	Costa Rica to northern Argentina	E
Apennine chamois	Rupicapra rupicapra ornata	Italy	E
Cheetah	Acinonyx jubatus	Africa to India	E
Chimpanzee	Pan troglodytes	Africa	E
Bonobo	Pan paniscus	Zaire	E
Chinchilla	Chinchilla brevicaudata boliviana	Bolivia	E
Malabar large-spotted civet	Viverra civettina (megaspila c.)	India	E
Cochito (vaquita)	Phocoena sinus	Mexico (Gulf of California)	E
Bactrian deer	Cervus elaphus bactrianus	Tajikistan, Uzbekistan, Afghanistan	E
Barbary deer	Cervus elaphus barbarus	Morocco, Tunisia, Algeria	E
Calamianes deer (Philippine)	Axis porcinus calamianensis	Philippines (Calamian Islands)	E
Cedros Island mule deer	Odocoileus hemionus cerrosensis	Mexico (Cedros Island)	E
Columbian white-tailed deer	Odocoileus virginianus leucurus	U.S. (WA, OR)	E
Corsican red deer	Cervus elaphus corsicanus	Corsica, Sardinia	E
Eld's brow-antlered deer	Cervus eldi	India to Southeast Asia	E
Formosan sika deer	Cervus nippon taioanus	Taiwan	E
Indochina hog deer	Axis porcinus annamiticus	Thailand, Indochina	E
Key deer	Odocoileus virginianus clavium	U.S. (Florida)	E
Kuhl's deer (Bawean deer)	Axis porcinus kuhli	Indonesia	E
Marsh deer	Blastocerus dichotomus	Argentina, Uruguay, Paraguay, Bolivia, Brazil	E
McNeill's deer	Cervus elaphus macneilli	China (Xinjiang, Tibet)	E
Musk deer	Moschus spp. (all species)	Central and eastern Asia	E
North China sika deer	Cervus nippon mandarinus	China (Shandong and Hebei Provinces)	E
Pampas deer	Ozotoceros bezoarticus	Brazil, Argentina, Uruguay, Bolivia, Paraguay	E
Persian fallow deer	Dama mesopotamica (dama m.)	Iraq, Iran	E
Kerama deer	Cervus nippon keramae	Japan (Ryukyu Islands)	E
Shansi sika deer	Cervus nippon grassianus	China (Shanxi Province)	E
South China sika deer	Cervus nippon kopschi	Southern China	E
Swamp deer	Cervus duvauceli	India, Nepal	E
Visayan deer	Cervus alfredi	Philippines	E
Yarkand deer	Cervus elaphus yarkandensis	China (Xinjiang)	E
Dhole	Cuon alpinus	C.I.S., Korea, China, India, Southeast Asia	E
Dibbler	Antechinus apicalis	Australia	E
African wild dog	Lycaon pictus	Sub-Saharan Africa	E
Chinese river dolphin	Lipotes vexillifer	China	E
Indus river dolphin	Platanista minor	Pakistan (Indus River and tributaries)	E
Drill	Mandrillus leucophaeus	Equatorial West Africa	E
Dugong	Dugong dugon	East Africa to southern Japan, including U.S. (Trust Territories)	E
Jentink's duiker	Cephalophus jentinki	Sierra Leone, Liberia, Côte d'Ivoire	E
Western giant eland	Taurotragus derbianus derbianus	Senegal to Côte d'Ivoire	E
African elephant	Loxodonta africana	Africa	T
Asian elephant	Elephas maximus	South-central and southeastern Asia	E
Black-footed ferret	Mustela nigripes	Western U.S., western Canada	E
Northern swift fox	Vulpes velox hebes	U.S. (northern plains), Canada	E
San Joaquin kit fox	Vulpes macrotis mutica	U.S. (CA)	E
San Miguel Island fox	Urocyon littoralis littoralis	U.S. (CA)	E
Santa Catalina Island fox	Urocyon littoralis catalinae	U.S. (CA)	E
Santa Cruz Island fox	Urocyon littoralis santacruzae	U.S. (CA)	E
Santa Rosa Island fox	Urocyon littoralis santarosae	U.S. (CA)	E
Simien fox	Canis simensis	Ethiopia	E
Arabian gazelle	Gazella gazella	Arabian Peninsula, Palestine, Sinai	E
Clarke's gazelle	Ammodorcas clarkei	Somalia, Ethiopia	E
Mhorr gazelle	Gazella dama mhorr	Morocco	E
Moroccan gazelle	Gazella dorcas massaesyla	Morocco, Algeria, Tunisia	E
Mountain gazelle (Cuvier's)	Gazella cuvieri	Morocco, Algeria, Tunisia	E
Pelzeln's gazelle	Gazella dorcas pelzelni	Somalia	E
Rio de Oro dama gazelle	Gazella dama lozanoi	Western Sahara	E
Sand gazelle	Gazella subgutturosa marica	Jordan, Arabian Peninsula	E
Saudi Arabian gazelle	Gazella dorcas saudiya	Israel, Iraq, Jordan, Syria, Arabian Peninsula	E
Slender-horned gazelle	Gazella leptoceros	Sudan, Egypt, Algeria, Libya	E
Gibbons	Hylobates, Nomascus, Hoolock, Symphalanges	China, India, Southeast Asia	E
Gray goral	Naemorhedus goral	East Asia	E
Gorillas	Gorilla spp.	Central and western Africa	E
Hispid hare	Caprolagus hispidus	India, Nepal, Bhutan	E
Swayne's hartebeest	Alcelaphus buselaphus swaynei	Ethiopia, Somalia	E
Tora hartebeest	Alcelaphus buselaphus tora	Ethiopia, Sudan, Egypt	E
Pygmy hog	Sus salvanius	India, Nepal, Bhutan, Sikkim	E
Przewalski's horse	Equus przewalskii	Mongolia, China	E
North Andean huemul	Hippocamelus antisensis	Ecuador, Peru, Chile, Bolivia, Argentina	E
South Andean huemul	Hippocamelus bisulcus	Chile, Argentina	E
Cabrera's hutia	Capromys angelcabrerai	Cuba	E
Dwarf hutia	Capromys nana	Cuba	E
Large-eared hutia	Capromys auritus	Cuba	E
Little earth hutia	Capromys sanfelipensis	Cuba	E
Barbary hyena	Hyaena hyaena barbara	Morocco, Algeria, Tunisia	E
Brown hyena	Parahyaena brunnea	Southern Africa	E
Pyrenean ibex	Capra pyrenaica pyrenaica	Spain	E
Walia ibex	Capra walie	Ethiopia	E
Black-faced impala	Aepyceros melampus petersi	Namibia, Angola	E
Indri	Indri indri	Malagasy Republic (Madagascar)	E
Jaguar	Panthera onca	U.S. (AZ, CA, LA, NM, TX), Mexico, Central and South America	E
Guatemalan jaguarundi	Puma yagouaroundi fossata	Mexico, Nicaragua	E
Gulf Coast jaguarundi	Puma yagouarondi cacomitli	U.S. (TX), Mexico	E
Panamanian jaguarundi	Puma yagouaroundi panamensis	Nicaragua, Costa Rica, Panama	E
Sinaloan jaguarundi	Puma yagouaroundi tolteca	U.S. (AZ), Mexico	E
Fresno kangaroo rat	Dipodomys nitratoides exilis	U.S. (CA)	E
Giant kangaroo rat	Dipodomys ingens	U.S. (CA)	E
Morro Bay kangaroo rat	Dipodomys heermanni morroensis	U.S. (CA)	E
San Bernardino Merriam's kangaroo rat	Dipodomys merriami parvus	U.S. (CA)	E
Stephens's kangaroo rat	Dipodomys stephensi (incl. D. cascus)	U.S. (CA)	E
Tipton kangaroo rat	Dipodomys nitratoides nitratoides	U.S. (CA)	E
Tasmanian forester kangaroo	Macropus giganteus tasmaniensis	Australia (Tasmania)	E
Koala	Phascolarctos cinereus	Australia	T
Kouprey	Bos sauveli	Vietnam, Laos, Cambodia, Thailand	E
Capped langur	Trachypithecus pileatus	India, Burma, Bangladesh	E
Red-shanked douc	Pygathrix nemaeus	Cambodia, Laos, Vietnam	E
Francois' langur	Trachypithecus francoisi	China (Guangxi), Indochina	E
Gee's golden langur	Trachypithecus geei	India (Assam), Bhutan	E
Gray langurs	Semnopithecus spp.	China (Tibet), India, Pakistan, Kashmir, Sri Lanka, Sikkim, Bangladesh	E
Mentawai langur	Presbytis potenziani	Indonesia	T
Pig-tailed langur	Simias concolor	Indonesia	E
Purple-faced langur	Trachypithecus vetulus	Sri Lanka	T
Red lechwe	Kobus leche	Southern Africa	T
Lemurs	all genera in the Lemuriformes	Malagasy Republic (Madagascar)	E
Leopard	Panthera pardus	Africa, Asia	E
Clouded leopard	Neofelis nebulosa	Southeastern and south-central Asia, Taiwan	E
Snow leopard	Uncia uncia	Central Asia	E
Spotted linsang	Prionodon pardicolor	Nepal, Assam, Vietnam, Cambodia, Laos, Burma	E
Asiatic lion	Panthera leo persica	Turkey to India	E
Pygmy slow loris	Nycticebus pygmaeus	Indochina	T
Canada lynx	Lynx canadensis	U.S. (AK, CO, ID, ME, MI, MN, MT, NH, NY, OR, UT, VT, WA, WI, WY), Canada	T
Spanish lynx	Felis pardina	Spain, Portugal	E
Formosan rock macaque	Macaca cyclopis	Taiwan	T
Japanese macaque	Macaca fuscata	Japan (Shikoku, Kyushu and Honshū Islands)	T
Lion-tailed macaque	Macaca silenus	India	E
Stump-tailed macaque	Macaca arctoides	India (Assam) to southern China	T
Toque macaque	Macaca sinica	Sri Lanka	T
Amazonian manatee	Trichechus inunguis	South America (Amazon R. basin)	E
West African manatee	Trichechus senegalensis	West Coast of Africa from Senegal River to Cuanza River	T
West Indian manatee	Trichechus manatus	U.S. (southeastern), Caribbean Sea, South America	E
Mandrill	Mandrillus sphinx	Equatorial West Africa	E
Tana River mangabey	Cercocebus galeritus	Kenya	E
Collared mangabey	Cercocebus torquatus	Senegal to Ghana; Nigeria to Gabon	E
Margay	Leopardus (Felis) wiedii	U.S. (TX), Central and South America	E
Chiltan markhor (wild goat)	Capra falconeri (aegragrus) chiltanensis	Chiltan Range of west-central Pakistan	E
Kabul markhor	Capra falconeri megaceros	Afghanistan, Pakistan	E
Straight-horned markhor	Capra falconeri jerdoni	Afghanistan, Pakistan	E
Buffy-headed marmoset	Callithrix (Callithrix) flaviceps	Brazil	E
Cottontop tamarin	Saguinus oedipus	Costa Rica to Colombia	E
Goeldi's marmoset	Callimico goeldii	Brazil, Colombia, Ecuador, Peru, Bolivia	E
Buffy-tufted marmoset	Callithrix (Callithrix) aurita	Brazil	E
Vancouver Island marmot	Marmota vancouverensis	Canada (Vancouver Island)	E
Eastern jerboa marsupial	Antechinomys laniger	Australia	E
Large desert marsupial-mouse	Sminthopsis psammophila	Australia	E
Long-tailed marsupial-mouse	Sminthopsis longicaudata	Australia	E
Formosan yellow-throated marten	Martes flavigula chrysospila	Taiwan	E
Black colobus	Colobus satanas	Equatorial Guinea, People's Republic of Congo, Cameroon, Gabon	E
Guatemalan black howler	Alouatta pigra	Mexico, Guatemala, Belize	T
Diana monkey	Cercopithecus diana	Coastal West Africa	E
Gray snub-nosed monkey	Rhinopithecus brelichi	China	E
L'Hoest's monkey	Cercopithecus lhoesti	Upper eastern Congo River Basin, Cameroon	E
Mantled howler	Alouatta palliata	Mexico to South America	E
Preuss's red colobus	Piliocolobus preussi	Cameroon	E
Proboscis monkey	Nasalis larvatus	Borneo	E
Central American squirrel monkey	Saimiri oerstedii	Costa Rica, Panama	E
White-throated guenon	Cercopithecus erythrogaster	Western Nigeria	E
Red-eared guenon	Cercopithecus erythrotis	Nigeria, Cameroon, Fernando Po	E
Golden snub-nosed monkey	Rhinopithecus roxellana	China	E
Geoffroy's spider monkey	Ateles geoffroyi	Costa Rica, Nicaragua	E
Tana River red colobus	Piliocolobus rufomitratus	Kenya	E
Tonkin snub-nosed langur	Rhinopithecus avunculus	Vietnam	E
Southern muriqui	Brachyteles arachnoides	Brazil	E
Yellow-tailed woolly monkey	Oreonax flavicauda	Andes of northern Peru	E
Black snub-nosed monkey	Rhinopithecus bieti	China	E
Zanzibar red colobus	Piliocolobus kirkii	Tanzania	E
Point Arena mountain beaver	Aplodontia rufa nigra	U.S. (CA)	E
Alabama beach mouse	Peromyscus polionotus ammobates	U.S. (AL)	E
Anastasia Island beach mouse	Peromyscus polionotus phasma	U.S. (Florida)	E
Australian native mouse	Notomys aquilo	Australia	E
Australian native mouse	Zyzomys pedunculatus	Australia	E
Choctawhatchee Beach Mouse	Peromyscus polionotus allophrys	U.S. (Florida)	E
Field's mouse	Pseudomys fieldi	Australia	E
Gould's mouse	Pseudomys gouldii	Australia	E
Key Largo cotton mouse	Peromyscus gossypinus allapaticola	U.S. (Florida)	E
New Holland mouse	Pseudomys novaehollandiae	Australia	E
Pacific pocket mouse	Perognathus longimembris pacificus	U.S. (CA)	E
Peninsular bighorn sheep	Ovis canadensis nelsoni	U.S. (California) Peninsula distinct population segment	E
Perdido Key beach mouse	Peromyscus polionotus trissyllepsis	U.S. (AL, Florida)	E
Preble's meadow jumping mouse	Zapus hudsonius preblei	U.S. (CO, WY)	T
Salt marsh harvest mouse	Reithrodontomys raviventris	U.S. (CA)	E
Shark Bay mouse	Pseudomys praeconis	Australia	E
Shortridge's mouse	Pseudomys shortridgei	Australia	E
Smoky mouse	Pseudomys fumeus	Australia	E
Southeastern beach mouse	Peromyscus polionotus niveiventris	U.S. (Florida)	T
St. Andrew beach mouse	Peromyscus polionotus peninsularis	U.S. (Florida)	E
Western mouse	Pseudomys occidentalis	Australia	E
Fea's muntjac	Muntiacus feae	Northern Thailand, Burma	E
Eastern native-cat	Dasyurus viverrinus	Australia	E
Numbat	Myrmecobius fasciatus	Australia	E
Ocelot	Leopardus (Felis) pardalis	U.S. (AZ, TX) to Central and South America	E
Bornean orangutan	Pongo pygmaeus	Borneo, Sumatra	E
Arabian oryx	Oryx leucoryx	Arabian Peninsula	E
Cameroon clawless otter	Aonyx congicus (congica) microdon	Cameroon, Nigeria	E
Giant otter	Pteronura brasiliensis	South America	E
Long-tailed otter	Lontra (Lutra) longicaudis (incl. platensis)	South America	E
Marine otter	Lontra (Lutra) felina	Peru south to Straits of Magellan	E
Southern river otter	Lontra (Lutra) provocax	Chile, Argentina	E
Southern sea otter	Enhydra lutris nereis	West Coast, U.S. (CA, OR, WA) south to Mexico (Baja California)	T
Giant panda	Ailuropoda melanoleuca	China	E
Temnick's ground pangolin	Manis temminckii	Africa	E
Florida panther	Puma concolor coryi	U.S. (LA and AR east to SC and Florida)	E
Little planigale	Planigale ingrami subtilissima	Australia	E
Southern planigale	Planigale tenuirostris	Australia	E
Thin-spined porcupine	Chaetomys subspinosus	Brazil	E
Leadbeater's possum	Gymnobelideus leadbeateri	Australia	E
Mountain pygmy possum	Burramys parvus	Australia	E
Scaly-tailed possum	Wyulda squamicaudata	Australia	E
Mexican prairie dog	Cynomys mexicanus	Mexico	E
Utah prairie dog	Cynomys parvidens	U.S. (UT)	T
Peninsular pronghorn	Antilocapra americana peninsularis	Mexico (Baja California)	E
Sonoran pronghorn	Antilocapra americana sonoriensis	U.S. (AZ), Mexico	E
Pudú	Pudu puda	Southern South America	E
Eastern cougar	Puma concolor couguar	Eastern North America	E
Cougar (mountain lion)	Puma concolor (all subsp. except coryi)	Canada to South America	T(S/A)
Costa Rican cougar	Puma concolor costaricensis	Nicaragua, Panama, Costa Rica	E
Quokka	Setonix brachyurus	Australia	E
Lower Keys marsh rabbit	Sylvilagus palustris hefneri	U.S. (Florida)	E
Pygmy rabbit	Brachylagus idahoensis	U.S. (CA, ID, MT, NV, OR, UT, WA, WY)	E
Riparian brush rabbit	Sylvilagus bachmani riparius	U.S. (CA)	E
Ryukyu rabbit	Pentalagus furnessi	Japan (Ryukyu Islands)	E
Volcano rabbit	Romerolagus diazi	Mexico	E
False water rat	Xeromys myoides	Australia	E
Stick-nest rat	Leporillus conditor	Australia	E
Brush-tailed rat-kangaroo	Bettongia penicillata	Australia	E
Desert rat-kangaroo (plain)	Caloprymnus campestris	Australia	E
Gaimard's rat-kangaroo	Bettongia gaimardi	Australia	E
Lesueur's rat-kangaroo	Bettongia lesueur	Australia	E
Queensland rat-kangaroo	Bettongia tropica	Australia	E
Black rhinoceros	Diceros bicornis	Sub-Saharan Africa	E
Great Indian rhinoceros	rhinoceros unicornis	India, Nepal	E
Javan rhinoceros	rhinoceros sondaicus	Indonesia, Indochina, Burma, Thailand, Sikkim, Bangladesh, Malaysia	E
Northern white rhinoceros	Ceratotherium simum cottoni	Zaire, Sudan, Uganda, Central African Republic	E
Sumatran rhinoceros	Dicerorhinus sumatrensis	Bangladesh to Vietnam to Indonesia (Borneo)	E
Marsh rice rat (Florida subspecies)	Oryzomys palustris natator	U.S. (Florida)	E
Mongolian saiga (antelope)	Saiga tatarica mongolica	Mongolia	E
Black bearded saki	Chiropotes satanas	Brazil	E
White-nosed saki	Chiropotes albinasus	Brazil	E
Caribbean monk seal	Monachus tropicalis	Caribbean Sea, Gulf of Mexico	E
Guadalupe fur seal	Arctophoca townsendi	U.S. (Farallon Islands of CA) south to Mexico (Islas Revillagigedo)	T
Hawaiian monk seal	Monachus schauinslandi	U.S. (HI)	E
Mediterranean monk seal	Monachus monachus	Mediterranean, Northwest African Coast and Black Sea	E
Saimaa seal	Phoca hispida saimensis	Finland (Lake Saimaa)	E
Steller sea-lion	Eumetopias jubatus	U.S. (AK) Western Distinct Population Segment only (Alaska), Canada, Russia; North Pacific Ocean	E & T
Seledang	Bos gaurus	Bangladesh, Southeast Asia, India	E
serow	Naemorhedus (Capricornis) sumatraensis	East Asia, Sumatra	E
Barbary serval	Leptailurus (Felis) serval constantina	Algeria	E
Shapo	Ovis vignei vignei	Kashmir	E
Sierra Nevada bighorn sheep	Ovis canadensis sierrae	U.S. (California, Sierra Nevada range)	E
Shou	Cervus elaphus wallichi	Tibet, Bhutan	E
Buena Vista Lake ornate shrew	Sorex ornatus relictus	U.S. (CA)	E
Siamang	Symphalangus syndactylus	Malaysia, Indonesia	E
Sifakas	Propithecus spp.	Malagasy Republic (Madagascar)	E
Brazilian three-toed sloth	Bradypus torquatus	Brazil	E
Cuban solenodon	Solenodon cubanus	Cuba	E
Hispaniolan solenodon	Solenodon paradoxus	Dominican Republic, Haiti	E
Carolina northern flying squirrel	Glaucomys sabrinus coloratus	U.S. (NC, TN)	E
Delmarva Peninsula fox squirrel	Sciurus niger cinereus	U.S. (Delmarva Peninsula to southeastern PA)	E
Mount Graham red squirrel	Tamiasciurus hudsonicus grahamensis	U.S. (AZ)	E
Northern Idaho ground squirrel	Spermophilus brunneus brunneus	U.S. (ID)	T
Virginia northern flying squirrel	Glaucomys sabrinus fuscus	U.S. (VA, WV)	E
Barbary stag	Cervus elaphus barbarus	Tunisia, Algeria	E
Kashmir stag	Cervus elaphus hanglu	Kashmir	E
Zanzibar suni	Neotragus moschatus moschatus	Zanzibar (and nearby islands)	E
Arabian tahr	Hemitragus jayakari	Oman	E
Tamaraw	Bubalus mindorensis	Philippines	E
Lion tamarins	Leontopithecus spp.	Brazil	E
Pied tamarin	Saguinus bicolor	Brazil	E
White-footed tamarin	Saguinus leucopus	Colombia	T
Asian tapir	tapirus indicus	Burma, Laos, Cambodia, Vietnam, Malaysia, Indonesia, Thailand	E
Central American tapir	tapirus bairdii	Southern Mexico to Colombia and Ecuador	E
Mountain tapir	tapirus pinchaque	Colombia, Ecuador and possibly Peru and Venezuela	E
South American tapir (Brazilian)	tapirus terrestris	Colombia and Venezuela south to Paraguay and Argentina	E
Philippine tarsier	Tarsius syrichta	Philippines	T
Tiger	Panthera tigris	Temperate and tropical Asia	E
Uakari (all species)	Cacajao spp.	Peru, Brazil, Ecuador, Colombia, Venezuela	E
Urial	Ovis musimon ophion	Cyprus	E
Vicuna	Vicugna vicugna	South America (Andes)	E
Amargosa vole	Microtus californicus scirpensis	U.S. (CA)	E
Florida salt marsh vole	Microtus pennsylvanicus dukecampbelli	U.S. (Florida)	E
Hualapai Mexican vole	Microtus mexicanus hualpaiensis	U.S. (AZ)	E
Banded hare wallaby	Lagostrophus fasciatus	Australia	E
Brindled nail-tailed wallaby	Onychogalea fraenata	Australia	E
Crescent nail-tailed wallaby	Onychogalea lunata	Australia	E
Parma wallaby	Macropus parma	Australia	E
Western hare wallaby	Lagorchestes hirsutus	Australia	E
Yellow-footed rock-wallaby	Petrogale xanthopus	Australia	E
Blue whale	Balaenoptera musculus	Oceanic	E
Bowhead whale	Balaena mysticetus	Oceanic (north latitudes only)	E
Fin whale	Balaenoptera physalus	Oceanic	E
Gray whale	Eschrichtius robustus	North Pacific Ocean—coastal and Bering Sea, formerly North Atlantic Ocean	E
Humpback whale	Megaptera novaeangliae	Oceanic	E
Right whales	Eualaena spp.	Oceanic	E
Sei whale	Balaenoptera borealis	Oceanic	E
Sperm whale	Physeter macrocephalus	Oceanic	E
Gray wolf	Canis lupus	Holarctic	E
Maned wolf	Chrysocyon brachyurus	Argentina, Bolivia, Brazil, Paraguay, Uruguay	E
Red wolf	Canis rufus	U.S. (SE U.S., west to central TX)	E
Queensland hairy-nosed wombat (incl. Barnard's)	Lasiorhinus krefftii (formerly L. barnardi and L. gillespiei)	Australia	E
Key Largo woodrat	Neotoma floridana smalli	U.S. (Florida)	E
Riparian woodrat (San Joaquin Valley)	Neotoma fuscipes riparia	U.S. (CA)	E
Wild yak	Bos mutus (grunniens m.)	China (Tibet), India	E
Grevy's zebra	Equus grevyi	Kenya, Ethiopia, Somalia	T
Hartmann's mountain zebra	Equus zebra hartmannae	Namibia, Angola	T
Mountain zebra	Equus zebra zebra	South Africa	E

== Birds ==
Common name	Scientific name	Home range	status
Hawaii akepa (honeycreeper)	Loxops coccineus coccineus	U.S. (HI)	E
Maui ʻakepa (honeycreeper)	Loxops coccineus ochraceus	U.S. (HI)	E
Kauaʻi ʻakialoa (honeycreeper)	Hemignathus procerus	U.S. (HI)	E
Akiapola`au (honeycreeper)	Hemignathus munroi	U.S. (HI)	E
Amsterdam albatross	Diomedea amsterdamensis	Indian Ocean - Amsterdam Island	E
Short-tailed albatross	Phoebastria albatrus	North Pacific Ocean and Bering Sea - Canada, China, Japan, Mexico, Russia, Taiwan, U.S. (AK, CA, HI, OR, WA)	E
Thyolo alethe	Alethe choloensis	Malawi, Mozambique	E
Yellow-shouldered blackbird	Agelaius xanthomus	U.S. (PR)	E
Masked bobwhite (quail)	Colinus virginianus ridgwayi	U.S. (AZ), Mexico (Sonora)	E
Abbott's booby	Papasula (Sula) abbotti	Indian Ocean - Christmas Island	E
Western bristlebird	Dasyornis longirostris	Australia	E
Western rufous bristlebird	Dasyornis broadbenti litoralis	Australia	E
Mauritius olivaceous bulbul	Hypsipetes borbonicus olivaceus	Indian Ocean - Mauritius	E
Sao Miguel bullfinch	Pyrrhula pyrrhula murina	Eastern Atlantic Ocean - Azores	E
Uluguru bushshrike	Malaconotus alius	Tanzania	T
New Zealand bushwren	Xenicus longipes	New Zealand	E
Great Indian bustard	Ardeotis nigriceps	India, Pakistan	E
Cahow	Pterodroma cahow	North Atlantic Ocean - Bermuda	E
Audubon's crested caracara	Caracara plancus audubonii	U.S. (AZ, Florida, LA, NM, TX) south to Panama; Cuba	T
Andean condor	Vultur gryphus	Colombia to Chile and Argentina	E
California condor	Gymnogyps californianus	U.S. (AZ, CA, OR), Mexico (Baja California)	E
Hawaiian coot	Fulica americana alai	U.S. (HI)	E
Banded cotinga	Cotinga maculata	Brazil	E
White-winged cotinga	Xipholena atropurpurea	Brazil	E
Black-necked crane	Grus nigricollis	China (Tibet)	E
Cuba sandhill crane	Grus canadensis nesiotes	West Indies - Cuba	E
Hooded crane	Grus monacha	Japan, Russia	E
Red-crowned crane	Grus japonensis	China, Japan, Korea, Russia	E
Mississippi sandhill crane	Grus canadensis pulla	U.S. (MS)	E
Siberian white crane	Grus leucogeranus	C.I.S. (Siberia) to India, including Iran and China	E
White-naped crane	Grus vipio	Mongolia	E
Whooping crane	Grus americana	Canada, U.S. (Rocky Mountains east to Carolinas), Mexico	E
Hawaii creeper	Oreomystis mana	U.S. (HI)	E
Molokai creeper	Paroreomyza flammea	U.S. (HI)	E
Oahu creeper	Paroreomyza maculata	U.S. (HI)	E
Hawaiian crow	Corvus hawaiiensis	U.S. (HI)	E
Mariana crow	Corvus kubaryi	Western Pacific Ocean - U.S. (Guam, Rota)	E
White-necked crow	Corvus leucognaphalus	U.S. (PR), Dominican Republic, Haiti	E
Mauritius cuckoo-shrike	Coracina typica	Indian Ocean - Mauritius	E
Reunion cuckoo-shrike	Coracina newtoni	Indian Ocean - Réunion	E
Razor-billed curassow	Mitu tuberosum	Brazil (eastern)	E
Red-billed curassow	Crax blumenbachii	Brazil	E
Trinidad white-headed curassow	Aburria pipile	West Indies - Trinidad	E
Eskimo curlew	Numenius borealis	Alaska and northern Canada to Argentina	E
Dove, cloven-feathered	Drepanoptila holosericea	Southwest Pacific Ocean - New Caledonia	E
Dove, Grenada gray-fronted	Leptotila rufaxilla wellsi	West Indies - Grenada	E
Hawaiian duck	Anas wyvilliana	U.S. (HI)	E
Laysan duck	Anas laysanensis	U.S. (HI)	E
Pink-headed duck	Rhodonessa caryophyllacea	India	E
White-winged wood duck	Cairina scutulata	India, Malaysia, Indonesia, Thailand	E
Bald eagle	Haliaeetus leucocephalus	North America south to northern Mexico	T
Greenland white-tailed eagle	Haliaeetus albicilla groenlandicus	Greenland and adjacent Atlantic islands	E
Harpy eagle	Harpia harpyja	Mexico south to Argentina	E
Madagascar sea eagle	Haliaeetus vociferoides	Madagascar	E
Madagascar serpent eagle	Eutriorchis astur	Madagascar	E
Philippine eagle	Pithecophaga jefferyi	Philippines	E
Spanish imperial eagle	Aquila heliaca adalberti	Spain, Morocco, Algeria	E
Chinese egret	Egretta eulophotes	China, Korea	E
Spectacled eider	Somateria fischeri	U.S. (AK), Russia	T
Steller's eider	Polysticta stelleri	U.S. (AK), Russia, winters to Scandinavia	T
O'ahu ‘Elepaio	Chasiempis ibidis	U.S. (HI)	E
Eurasian peregrine falcon	Falco peregrinus peregrinus	Europe, Eurasia south to Africa and Middle East	E
Northern aplomado falcon	Falco femoralis septentrionalis	U.S. (AZ, NM, TX), Mexico, Guatemala	E
Laysan finch (honeycreeper)	Telespiza cantans	U.S. (HI)	E
Nihoa finch (honeycreeper)	Telespiza ultima	U.S. (HI)	E
Euler's flycatcher	Empidonax euleri johnstonei	West Indies - Grenada	E
Seychelles paradise flycatcher	Terpsiphone corvina	Indian Ocean - Seychelles	E
Southwestern willow flycatcher	Empidonax traillii extimus	U.S. (AZ, CA, CO, NM, TX, UT), Mexico	E
Tahiti flycatcher	Pomarea nigra	South Pacific Ocean - Tahiti	E
Mauritius fody	Foudia rubra	Indian Ocean - Mauritius	E
Rodrigues fody	Foudia flavicans	Indian Ocean - Rodrigues Island (Mauritius)	E
Seychelles fody (weaver-finch)	Foudia sechellarum	Indian Ocean - Seychelles	E
Djibouti francolin	Francolinus ochropectus	Djibouti	E
Freira	Pterodroma madeira	Atlantic Ocean - Madeira Island	E
Andrew's frigatebird	Fregata andrewsi	East Indian Ocean	E
Coastal California gnatcatcher	Polioptila californica californica	U.S. (CA), Mexico	T
Hawaiian goose	Branta sandvicensis	U.S. (HI)	E
Christmas Island goshawk	Accipiter fasciatus natalis	Indian Ocean - Christmas Island	E
Slender-billed grackle	Quiscalus palustris	Mexico	E
Eyrean grasswren (flycatcher)	Amytornis goyderi	Australia	E
Alaotra grebe	Tachybaptus rufolavatus	Madagascar	E
Atitlan grebe	Podilymbus gigas	Guatemala	E
Nordmann's greenshank	Tringa guttifer	Russia, Japan, south to Malaya, Borneo	E
Horned guan	Oreophasis derbianus	Guatemala, Mexico	E
White-winged guan	Penelope albipennis	Peru	E
White-breasted guineafowl	Agelastes meleagrides	West Africa	T
Audouin's gull	Larus audouinii	Mediterranean Sea	E
Relict gull	Larus relictus	India, China	E
Galapagos hawk	Buteo galapagoensis	Ecuador (Galapagos Islands)	E
Hawaiian hawk ('lo)	Buteo solitarius	U.S. (HI)	E
Puerto Rican broad-winged hawk	Buteo platypterus brunnescens	U.S. (PR)	E
Puerto Rican sharp-shinned hawk	Accipiter striatus venator	U.S. (PR)	E
Hook-billed hermit (hummingbird)	Ramphodon (Glaucis) dohrnii	Brazil	E
Crested honeycreeper	Palmeria dolei	U.S. (HI)	E
Helmeted honeyeater	Lichenostomus melanops cassidix (Meliphaga c.)	Australia	E
Helmeted hornbill	Buceros vigil	Thailand, Malaysia	E
Japanese crested ibis	Nipponia nippon	China, Japan, Russia, Korea	E
Northern bald ibis	Geronticus eremita	Southern Europe, southwestern Asia, northern Africa	E
Florida scrub-jay	Aphelocoma coerulescens	U.S. (Florida)	T
Kagu	Rhynochetos jubatus	South Pacific Ocean - New Caledonia	E
Kākāpō	Strigops habroptilus	New Zealand	E
Mauritius kestrel	Falco punctatus	Indian Ocean - Mauritius	E
Seychelles kestrel	Falco araea	Indian Ocean - Seychelles Islands	E
Guam Micronesian kingfisher	Halcyon cinnamomina cinnamomina	West Pacific Ocean - U.S. (Guam)	E
Cuba hook-billed kite	Chondrohierax uncinatus wilsonii	West Indies - Cuba	E
Everglade snail kite	Rostrhamus sociabilis plumbeus	U.S. (Florida), Cuba	E
Grenada hook-billed kite	Chondrohierax uncinatus mirus	West Indies - Grenada	E
Kokako (wattlebird)	Callaeas cinerea	New Zealand	E
Raso lark	Alauda razae	Atlantic Ocean - Raso Island (Cape Verde)	E
Glaucous macaw	Anodorhynchus glaucus	Paraguay, Uruguay, Brazil	E
Indigo macaw	Anodorhynchus leari	Brazil	E
Little blue macaw	Cyanopsitta spixii	Brazil	E
Seychelles magpie robin (thrush)	Copsychus sechellarum	Indian Ocean - Seychelles Islands	E
Ibadan malimbe	Malimbus ibadanensis	Nigeria	E
Wood stork	Mycteria americana	U.S. (southeastern), Caribbean Sea, Central America, South America	T
