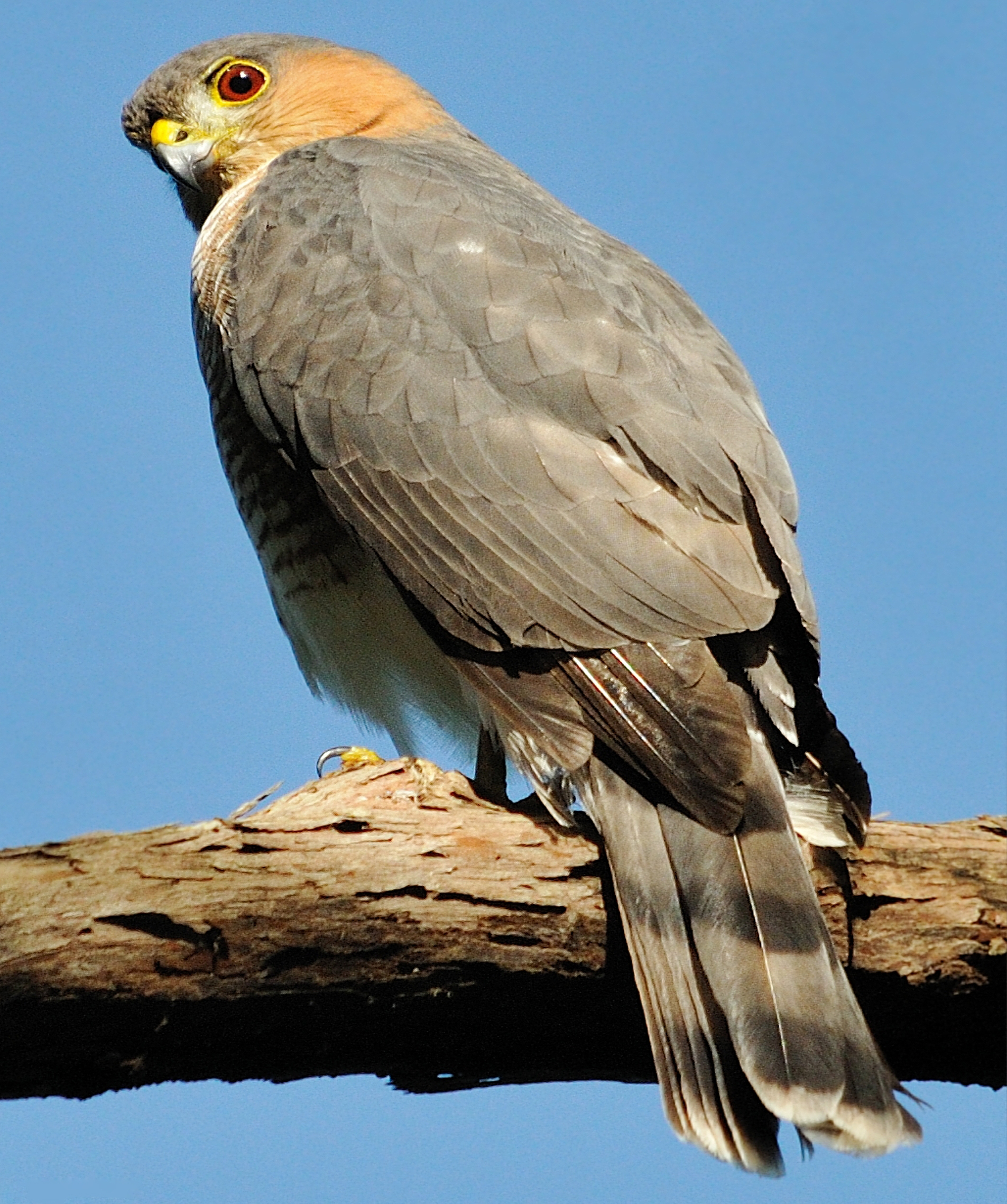

Conservation status
- Endangered (ESA)

Scientific classification
- Kingdom: Animalia
- Phylum: Chordata
- Class: Aves
- Order: Accipitriformes
- Family: Accipitridae
- Genus: Accipiter
- Species: A. striatus
- Subspecies: A. s. venator

Trinomial name
- Accipiter striatus venator Wetmore (1914)
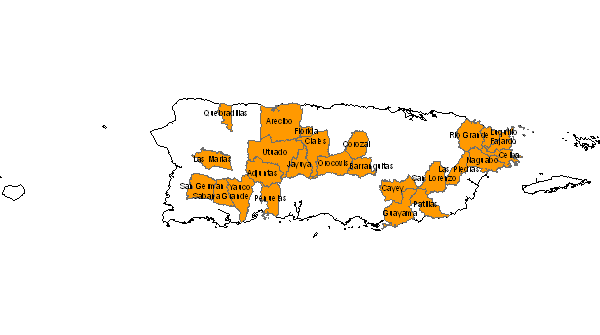
- Approximate range in orange

= Puerto Rican sharp-shinned hawk =

Subspecies of bird

The Puerto Rican sharp-shinned hawk (Accipiter striatus venator), falcón de sierra or gavilán pecho rufo in Spanish, is an endemic subspecies of the North American sharp-shinned hawk, occurring only in Puerto Rico. Discovered in 1912 and described as a distinct subspecies, it has been placed on the United States Fish and Wildlife Service list of endangered species because of its rapidly dwindling population in Puerto Rico. It can be found in the Toro Negro State Forest.

== Taxonomy ==
Although currently considered a subspecies of sharp-shinned hawk, a genetic study in 2021 found that it was fully isolated from both Continental and other Caribbean Island (Cuba, Hispaniola) populations of it, and recommended raising its status to the rank of species as Accipiter venator. This has however yet to be adopted by any of the ornithological authorities.

== Description ==
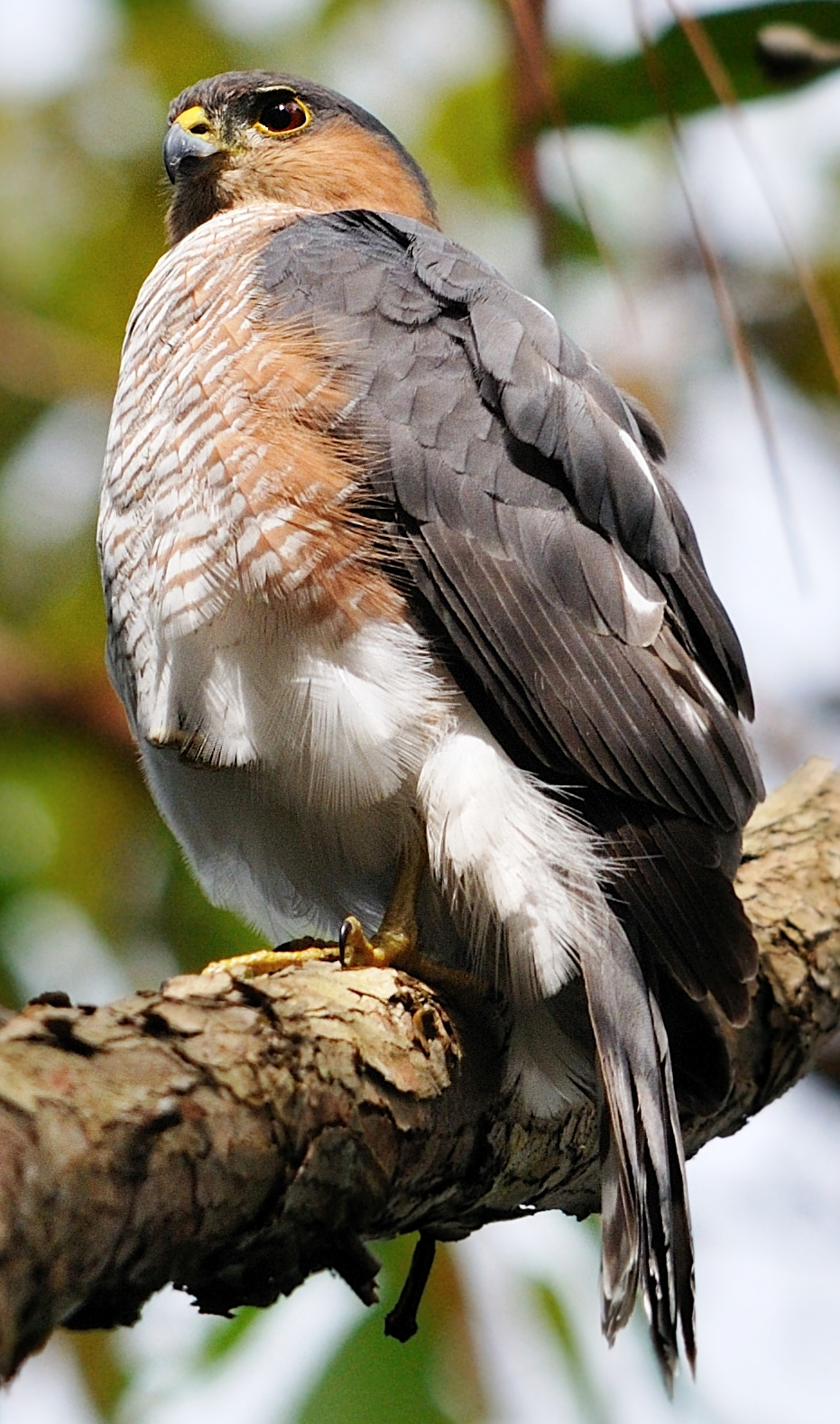
Perched on tree limb.

The Puerto Rican sharp-shinned hawk is a small forest hawk measuring approximately 28–33 cm (11–13 in). It has a dark blue/slate gray upper area with reddish-orange stripes on its breast. Immature birds have a brownish hue above and are striped below. It has broad wings and a proportionally long, squared-off tail, enabling it to turn and maneuver rapidly when chasing small birds through the forest canopy. The subspecies shows characteristics of sexual dimorphism, with the female almost 50% larger than the male. This allows each sex to focus their predatory efforts on different sized prey.

== Behavior ==
The Puerto Rican sharp-shinned hawk feeds primarily on small birds ranging in size from tanagers to hummingbirds. It requires a home range of approximately 150 hectares (370 acres). Females lay two to three white eggs in March or April and incubate them while the male searches for food. Average incubation period is approximately 32 days. Fledglings leave the nest 30 days after hatching.

== Distribution ==
Restricted to five isolated mountain forest areas within the subtropical lower mountain wet forests and subtropical wet forest life zones of the main island of Puerto Rico, the subspecies has suffered a 40% decline in population since 1992. As of 1997, its estimated population is approximately 150 birds. Human causes in population decline are from deforestation due to road construction, power lines, and communications facilities installations which have significantly reduced its habitat area. Natural disasters such as hurricanes also contribute significantly to population declines. Nest failures due to fledgling infestation with botfly larvae, warble fly larvae, and nest predation by the pearly-eyed thrasher (Margarops fuscatus) have also contributed to its population reduction. Although an overall population of 129 birds has been reported on the island (Delannoy, 1992), in El Yunque National Forest, the only two sharp-shinned hawks sighted at that time were a solitary territorial pair that were sighted in the south-central part of the forest. After Hurricane Maria struck Puerto Rico, the Peregrine Fund found only 19 sharp-shinneds on the island, and has launched a crisis fund campaign to solicit donations to help preserve the species.

== Nesting ==
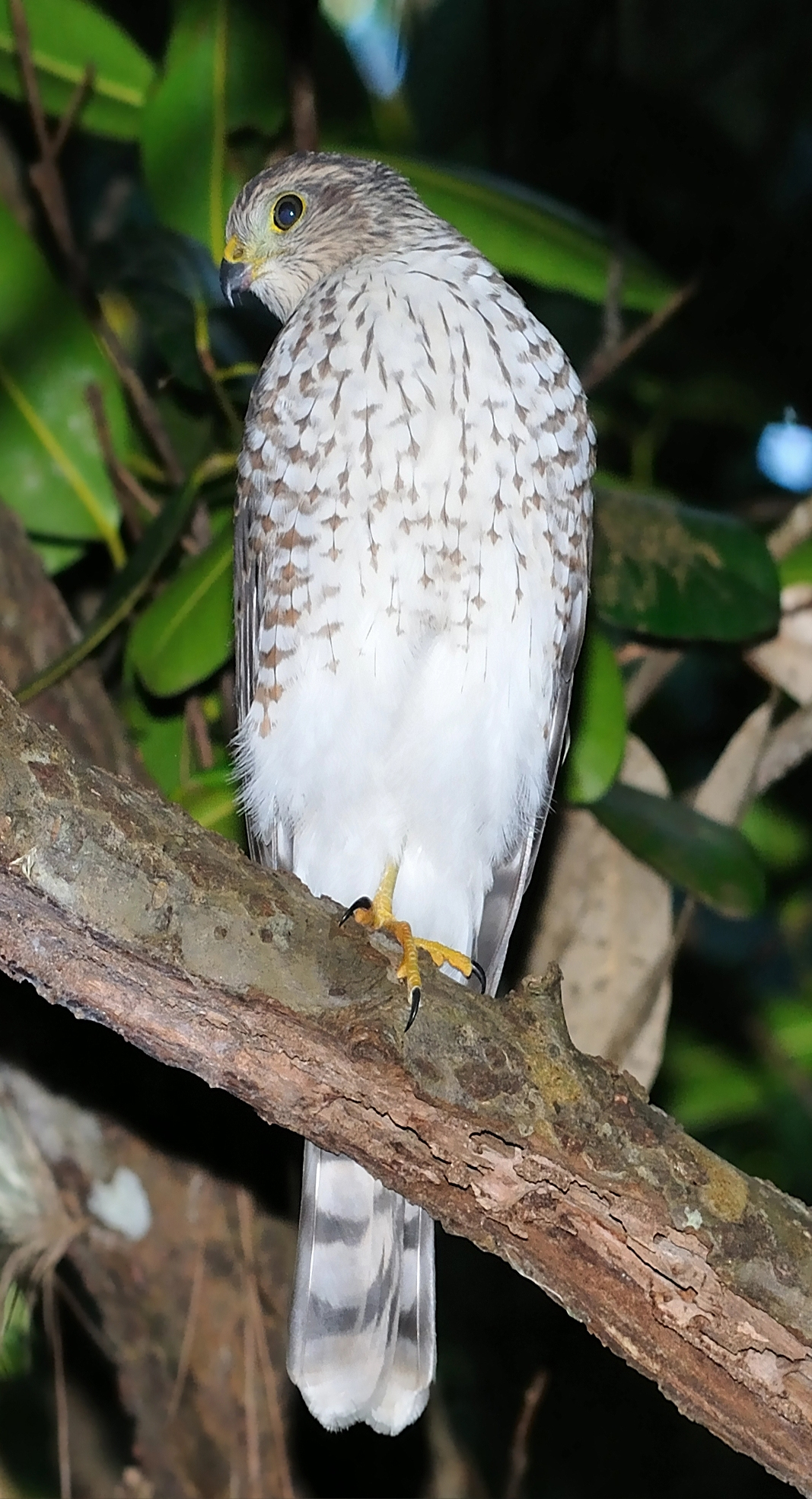
Juvenile

Puerto Rican sharp-shinned hawks select plantation and natural forest nest sites with similar vegetative structure and mountainous topography. Closed canopies and dense vegetation are sought by the hawks in the selection of nesting sites. They place their platform nests below the canopy on horizontal branches usually against the trunk or in crotches away from the trunk. Construction of nesting platforms usually begin in January after a breeding pair remain at their nesting sites permanently. Both males and females become more active in the nest building process one month before eggs are laid. Egg laying usually occurs during March and April and a second clutch may be laid rarely from May to July. Second clutches are only laid in the event the first brood of eggs is lost. Typical incubation periods last for one month. Nesting period ends once the juveniles fly short distances from the nest and roost in trees 10 to 15 meters (32 to 48 ft) from the nest. More than half of fledging failures are caused by warble fly larvae.

== Courtship and foraging ==
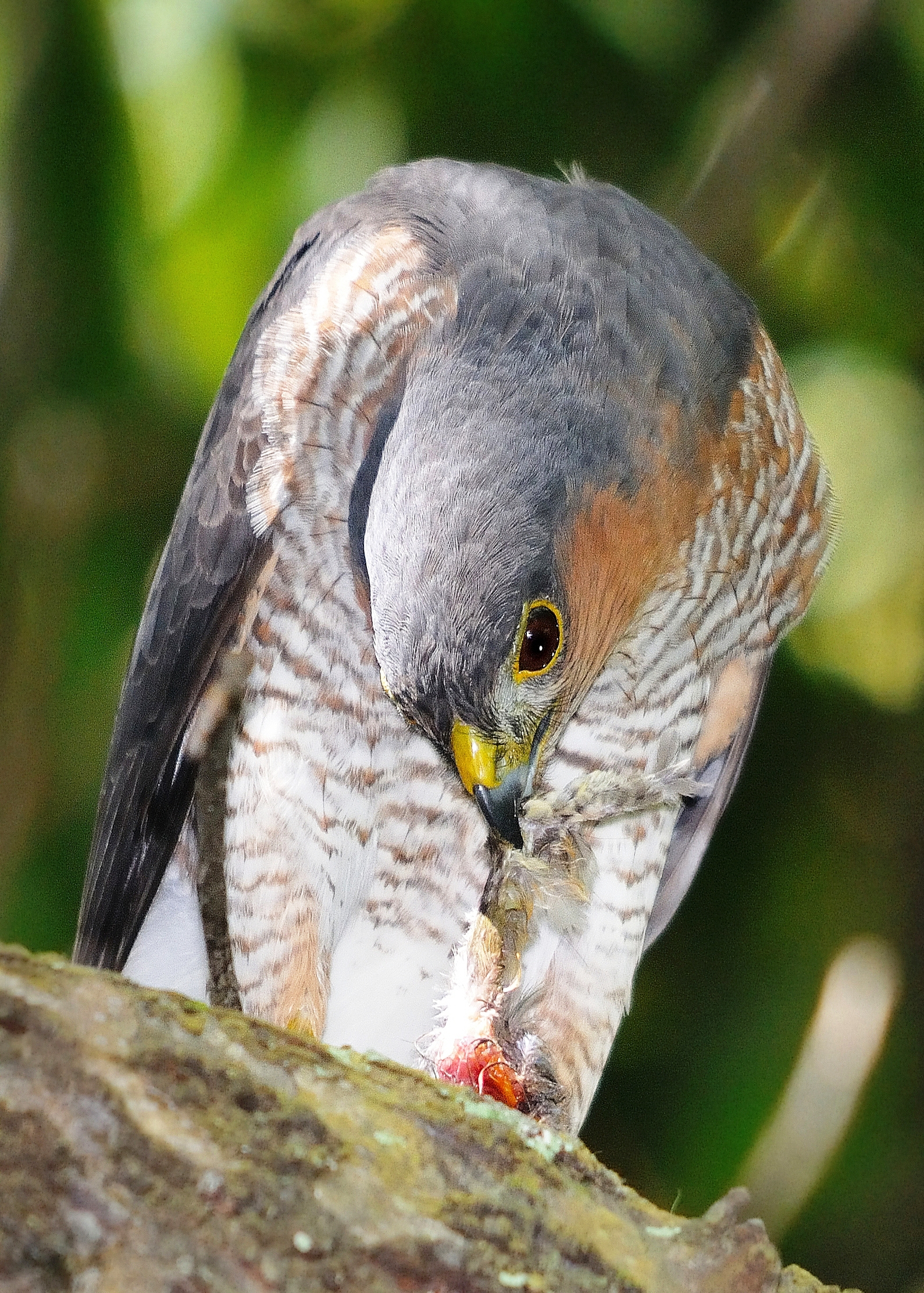
Feeding

Most activity during early occupancy of nesting sites consisted of courtship displays and territorial flights. Both the males and females partake in courtship displays which typically last from sunrise until mid-morning. In February, females stop foraging and remain near the nesting site. Only the female provides incubation and the role of the male is to provide all food to the female.

== Diet ==
The Puerto Rican sharp-shinned hawk's diet consists predominantly of small birds the size of tanagers, 30 grams (1.1 ounces) or smaller. Due to the larger size of the female, it is possible that some thrashers, 100 grams (3.5 ounces) are taken with some regularity.

== See also ==
- Birds of Puerto Rico
- Fauna of Puerto Rico
- List of endemic fauna of Puerto Rico
