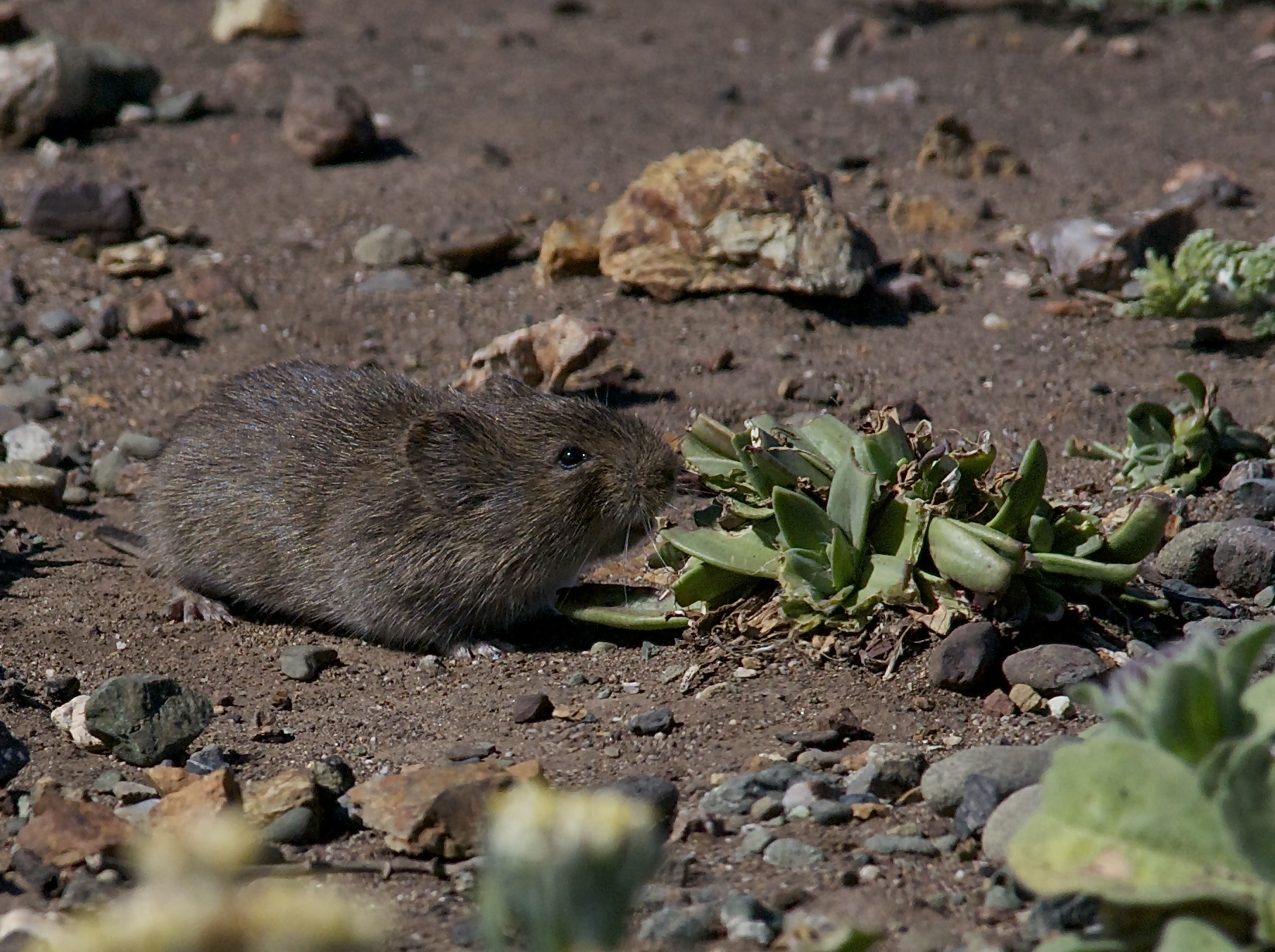

Conservation status
- Least Concern (IUCN 3.1)

Scientific classification
- Kingdom: Animalia
- Phylum: Chordata
- Class: Mammalia
- Infraclass: Placentalia
- Order: Rodentia
- Family: Cricetidae
- Subfamily: Arvicolinae
- Genus: Microtus
- Subgenus: Mynomes
- Species: M. californicus

Binomial name
- Microtus californicus (Peale, 1848)

Subspecies
- 17; see text
- IUCN range map for Microtus californicus, Version 2021-2

= California vole =

Species of rodent

The California vole (Microtus californicus) is a type of vole which lives throughout much of California and part of southwestern Oregon. It is also known as the "California meadow mouse", a misnomer as this species is a vole, not a mouse. It averages 172 mm (6.8 in) in length although this length varies greatly between subspecies.

== Description ==
The California vole is a medium-sized vole, and a typical member of its group in appearance. Males range from 152 to 196 mm (6.0 to 7.7 in) in head-body length, with a 42 to 58 mm (1.7 to 2.3 in) tail. Females are significantly smaller at 149 to 182 mm (5.9 to 7.2 in) in length with a 38 to 53 mm (1.5 to 2.1 in) tail. Males weigh from 41 to 81 g (1.4 to 2.9 oz), and females from 36 to 63 g (1.3 to 2.2 oz). Variation between different subspecies, though, is considerable, with the southern subspecies tending to be larger than those found further north.

The body is covered with cinnamon to tawny olive fur, ticked with occasional darker hairs, and fading to a medium grey on the underside. The tail is black above and grey below. The whiskers and feet are grey in color, with a patch of white fur near the anus. Between subspecies, those native to more highland habitats tend to be more reddish in color, and those in marshier environments tend to be darker. Males have a pair of scent glands on the hips, which are used to mark their trackways. Females have four pairs of teats, two in the chest, and two closer to the groin.

== Distribution and habitat ==
The California vole is found from El Rosario in Baja California in the south, through much of California and as far as Eugene, Oregon in the north. It is, however, absent from most of the deserts of southeastern California and from the extreme northeastern and northwestern corners of the state. It inhabits a range of different grassland habitats, from wet coastal marshland to dry uplands and savannah.

=== Subspecies ===
Seventeen subspecies are currently recognized, some of which are protected. They include:

- M. c. californicus - San Francisco region
- M. c. equivocatus - Baja California
- M. c. aestuarinus - central California
- M. c. constrictus - Humboldt County, California
- M. c. eximus - Oregon and north-central California
- M. c. grinelli - Sierra de Juárez, Baja California
- Monterey vole, M. c. halophilus - Monterey Bay, California
- M. c. huperuthrus - Baja California
- M. c. kernensis - Kern County, California
- M. c. mariposae - east-central California
- Mojave River vole, M. c. mohavensis (CDFG special concern) - Mojave Desert
- M. c. paludicola - Alameda County, California
- M. c. sanctidiegi - southwestern California
- San Pablo vole, M. c. sanpabloensis (CDFG special concern) - Contra Costa County, California
- Amargosa vole, M. c. scirpensis (Federal and State endangered) - Panamint Range, California
- South Coast marsh vole, M. c. stephensi (CDFG special concern) - Los Angeles region
- Owens Valley vole, M. c. vallicola (CDFG special concern) - White Mountains, California

== Ecology ==
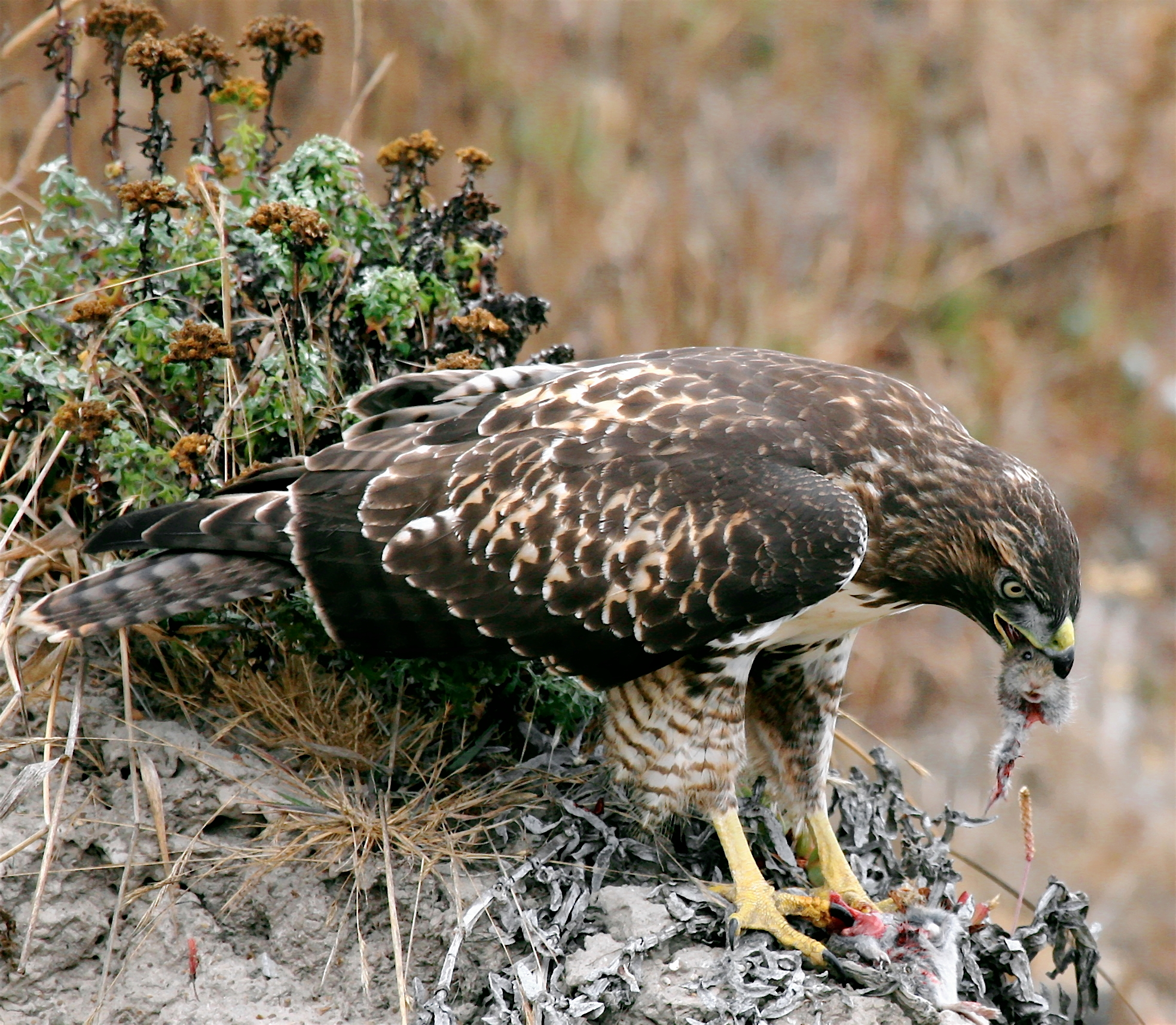
A juvenile red-tailed hawk eating a California vole

The California vole is herbivorous, feeding mainly on grasses and sedges, supplemented by other flowering herbs. Preferred foods include wild oats, ryegrass, and brome grass, although all of these are introductions from Europe, and therefore cannot represent the animal's original diet. They can become an agricultural pest, causing widespread damage especially to fields of artichokes, but also to crops such as alfalfa, potatoes, and asparagus.

Because the California vole is relatively common and widespread, it has numerous natural predators, including hawks, owls, egrets, long-tailed weasels, coyotes, skunks, mountain lions and garter snakes.

== Behavior ==
California voles are crepuscular or nocturnal. However, they spend much of their time below ground, using burrows connected by above-ground runways they use to find food. Home ranges are relatively small, with the animals rarely venturing far from their burrows; averages of 103 square metres (1,110 sq ft) for males and 68 square metres (730 sq ft) for females have been reported. The larger ranges of males overlap with the ranges of several nearby females, but they are generally aggressive only towards other nearby males, clawing and biting any intruders. Although they also sometimes use abandoned gopher tunnels, burrows dug by the voles themselves are blind-ending and range from 1.5 to 12 m (4.9 to 39.4 ft) in length. The voles construct nests of dried grass within their burrows; these have a single entrance, and are typically between 7 and 15 cm (2.8 and 5.9 in) below the surface.

The voles are active above ground primarily to find food, reaching the seeds on high grasses by standing on their hind legs and clipping the stems with their teeth. They often carry the food back to their burrow to eat it, although they do not hoard food or hibernate through the winter. California voles are often found in groups of a single male, one or more females, and a number of young, and the male may assist the female in construction of her nest before she gives birth. California voles are reasonably strong swimmers, and may use this tactic to attempt to escape from predators.

== Reproduction ==
California voles are able to breed almost year-round, although most breeding occurs during the middle of the wet season, from March to April. Males may breed with more than one female, although the species is not as strongly polygynous as some other voles. Copulation can be prolonged and repeated, and is followed by formation of a copulatory plug and by induced ovulation. Gestation lasts three weeks and results in the birth of up to 10 young, with four or five being most common. The female is ready to breed again with 15 hours of giving birth, and may give birth to several litters over the course of her life.

The young are born hairless and blind, weighing an average of 2.8 g (0.099 oz). They begin to grow fur within five days of birth, and their eyes open at 9 days, although they are capable of sensing light before this. The young are weaned at around two weeks of age, and have a full set of adult teeth by three weeks. Females reach sexual maturity after as little as three weeks, while males become sexually mature after six weeks. The lifespan is correspondingly short, with individuals living for less than a year, even in the absence of predators.

== Evolution ==
Fossils of members of the genus Microtus are known from California as far back as 1.2 million years ago, although it is unclear whether these represent California voles specifically, or a related, possibly extinct, species. Genetic evidence suggests the closest extant relative of the California vole is most likely the Mexican vole, Microtus mexicanus, and the species is known to be able to produce infertile hybrids with other closely related species, such as the montane vole. Indeed, matings between northern and southern subspecies of California vole do not always produce fertile offspring, with male hybrids in particular typically being infertile. This may indicate some of the subspecies are in the process of diverging into separate species, and it has even been proposed that the California vole may already represent two different species.
