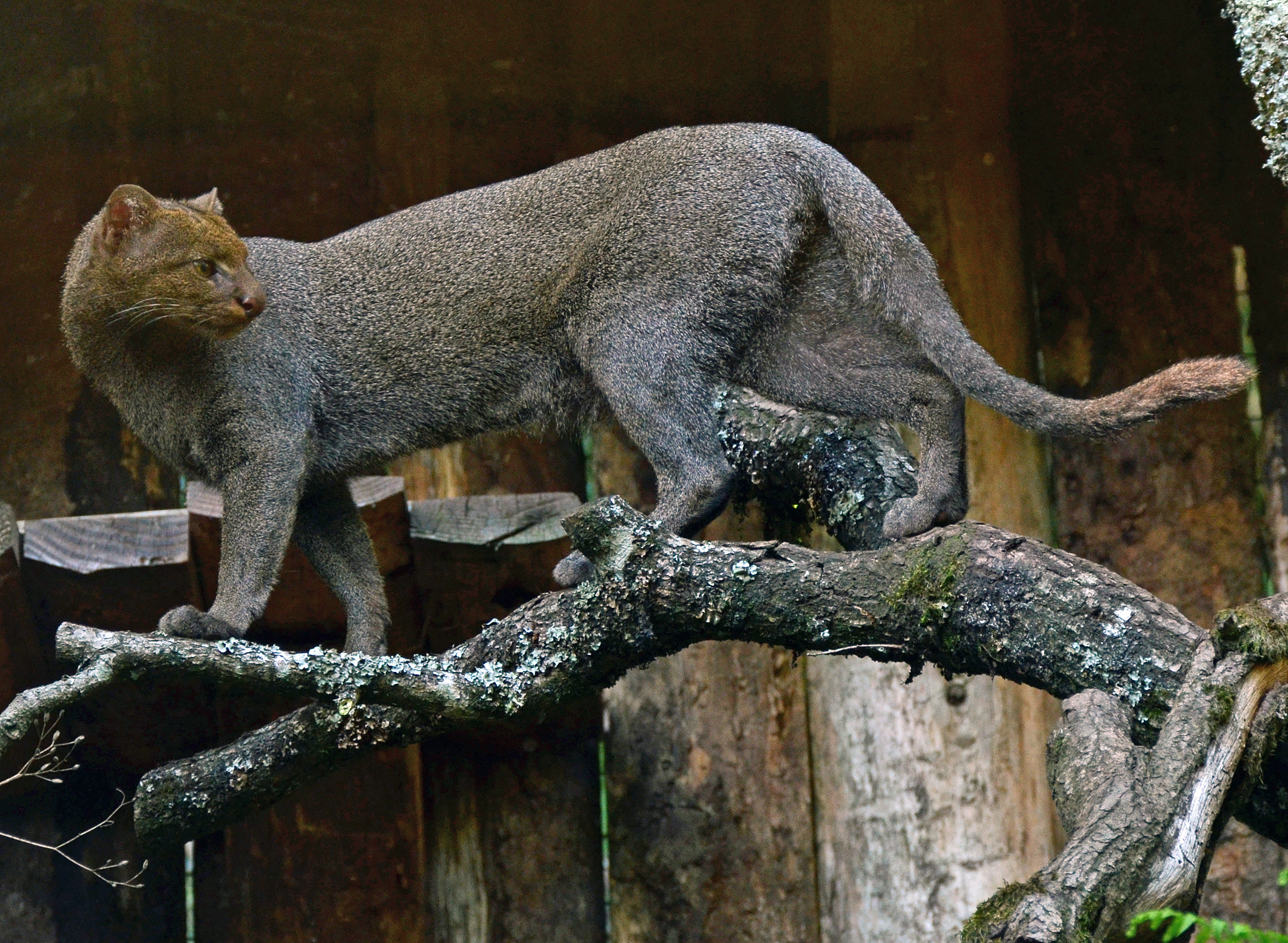
- In the Pont-Scorff zoo

Conservation status
- Near Threatened (IUCN 3.1)
- CITES Appendix I

Scientific classification
- Kingdom: Animalia
- Phylum: Chordata
- Class: Mammalia
- Order: Carnivora
- Family: Felidae
- Subfamily: Felinae
- Genus: Herpailurus; Severtzov, 1858
- Species: H. yagouaroundi

Binomial name
- Herpailurus yagouaroundi (Geoffroy Saint-Hilaire, 1803)
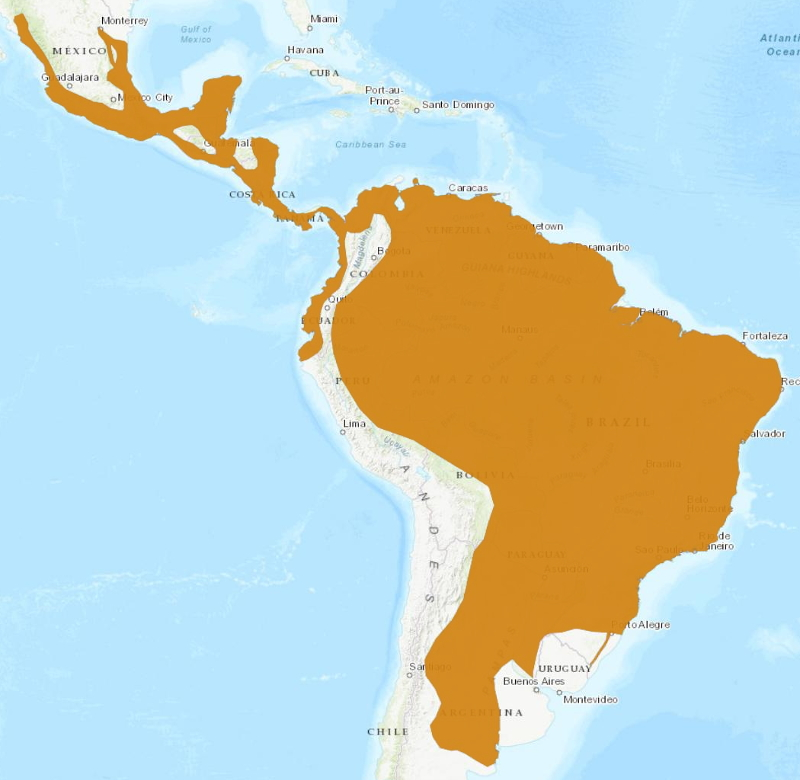
- Distribution of the jaguarundi (2015)

Synonyms
- List: Felis yagouaroundi Geoffroy, 1803; Puma yaguaroundi Lacépède, 1809; F. eyra Fischer, 1814; F. unicolor Thraill, 1819; F. cacomitli Berlandier, 1859; F. apache Mearns, 1901; F. fossata Mearns, 1901; F. panamensis Allen, 1904

= Jaguarundi =

Species of felid

The jaguarundi (Herpailurus yagouaroundi; /ˌdʒæɡwəˈrʌndi/ or /ˌʒæɡwəˈrʌndi/) is a wild cat native to the Americas. Its range extends from central Argentina in the south and much of South America east of the Andes, through Central America, and into northern Mexico. It occurred in the Lower Rio Grande Valley in south Texas as recently as the early 1990s but is now believed to be extirpated from the US. The jaguarundi is a medium-sized cat of slender build. Its coloration is uniform with two color morphs, gray and red. It has an elongated body, with relatively short legs, a small, narrow head, small, round ears, a short snout, and a long tail, resembling mustelids in these respects. It is about twice as large as a domestic cat (Felis catus), reaching nearly 360 mm (14 in) at the shoulder, and weighs 3.5–7 kg (7.7–15.4 lb).

Secretive and alert, the jaguarundi is typically solitary or forms pairs in the wild; however, captive individuals are more gregarious. Unlike other sympatric cats such as the ocelot, the jaguarundi is more active during the day and hunts mainly during daytime and evening hours. Individuals live in large home ranges, and are sparsely distributed within a region. The jaguarundi is an efficient climber, but typically prefers hunting on ground. It feeds on various kinds of prey, especially ground-feeding birds, reptiles, rodents and small mammals. Mating occurs throughout the year, with peaks at different times of the year across the range. After a gestation period of 70 to 75 days, a litter of one to four kittens is born. Lifespans of up to 15 years have been recorded in captivity.

The jaguarundi inhabits a broad array of both closed and open habitats ranging from tropical rainforests and deciduous forests to deserts and thorn scrubs. It is fairly common in Brazil, Peru, and Venezuela, but may be extirpated from the United States. It is listed as near threatened on the IUCN Red List, with populations in decline in many parts of its range due to loss and fragmentation of habitat, as well as persecution for killing poultry.

== Etymology ==
The common name "jaguarundi" comes from the Old Guarani word yaguarundi, similar to the Old Tupi word yawaum'di, meaning "dark jaguar". The name is pronounced /ˌʒæɡwəˈrʌndi/ or /ˌdʒæɡwəˈrʌndi/. In some Spanish-speaking countries, the jaguarundi is also called gato colorado, gato moro, león breñero, leoncillo and tigrillo. It is also called eyra, gato-mourisco, gato-preto, gato-vermelho and maracajá-preto in Brazilian Portuguese.

== Taxonomy ==
In 1803 Étienne Geoffroy Saint-Hilaire described two jaguarundi skins and skulls from unknown locations in Central America and proposed the scientific name Felis yagouarundi. In the 19th and 20th centuries, several more zoological specimens were described:

- Felis eyra proposed by Gotthelf Fischer von Waldheim in 1814 was a ferruginous skin from Paraguay.
- F. cacomitli proposed by Jean-Louis Berlandier in 1859 was a skull and a grayish skin of a female jaguarundi from the Rio Grande area in Mexico.
- F. yagouaroundi tolteca proposed by Oldfield Thomas in 1898 was a skull and a reddish skin from Sinaloa in Mexico.
- F. Ameghinoi proposed by Eduardo Ladislao Holmberg in 1898 for fossil cat bones, presumably of a jaguarundi, that were excavated near San Luis, Argentina.
- F. fossata by Edgar Alexander Mearns in 1901 was a large jaguarundi skull from Yucatán.
- F. panamensis by Joel Asaph Allen in 1904 was a dusky gray skin of a young adult female jaguarundi collected in Panama's Chiriquí Province.
- F. yagouaroundi melantho by Oldfield Thomas in 1914 were skulls and blackish brown skins of a male and a female from Pozuzo District in Peru.

The generic name Herpailurus was proposed by Nikolai Severtzov in 1858 for the jaguarundi. Later authors classified the jaguarundi in the genus Puma along with the cougar (P. concolor). Phylogeographical analysis of jaguarundi samples from across its range found no genetic evidence for subspecies. In 2017, the IUCN Cat Specialist Group revised felid taxonomy and recognises the jaguarundi as a monotypic taxon of the genus Herpailurus.

=== Phylogeny and evolution ===
- - - - Lynx lineage
        Lynx
    - - - Puma lineage
          - Acinonyx
            Acinonyx jubatus
            (Cheetah)
          - - Puma
              Puma concolor
              (Cougar)
            - Herpailurus
              Herpailurus yagouaroundi
              (Jaguarundi)
      - - Domestic cat lineage
          Felis
        - Leopard cat lineage
          - Otocolobus
          - Prionailurus

The Puma lineage of the family Felidae, depicted along with closely related genera

The jaguarundi is most closely related to the cougar; the jaguarundi-cougar clade is sister to the cheetah. These three species comprise the Puma lineage, one of the eight lineages of Felidae; the Puma lineage diverged from the rest 6.7 million years ago. The sister group of the Puma lineage is a clade of smaller Old World cats that includes the genera Felis, Otocolobus and Prionailurus.

The three species of the Puma lineage may have had a common ancestor during the Miocene, about 8.25 million years ago. Acinonyx possibly diverged from the lineage in the Americas; some authors alternatively suggest that the cheetah diverged in the Old World.

The Puma lineage appears to have migrated from Asia to North America after crossing the Bering Strait, arriving in South America via the Isthmus of Panama by the Late Pliocene or Early Pleistocene. This was possibly followed by the bifurcation of the lineage into the cougar and Herpailurus (represented by H. pumoides) in South America around 4 to 3 million years ago between the Late Pliocene and Early Pleistocene. H. pumoides went extinct around Middle Pleistocene, around the time the modern jaguarundi came into existence; the oldest fossils of the modern jaguarundi date back to the Late Pleistocene in Brazil around 0.5 million years ago. The original North American cougars were extirpated during the Pleistocene extinctions around 10,000 years ago; North America was then recolonized by South American cougars and jaguarundis 10,000–8,000 years ago. The extinct North American genus Miracinonyx is another member of this clade.

== Characteristics ==
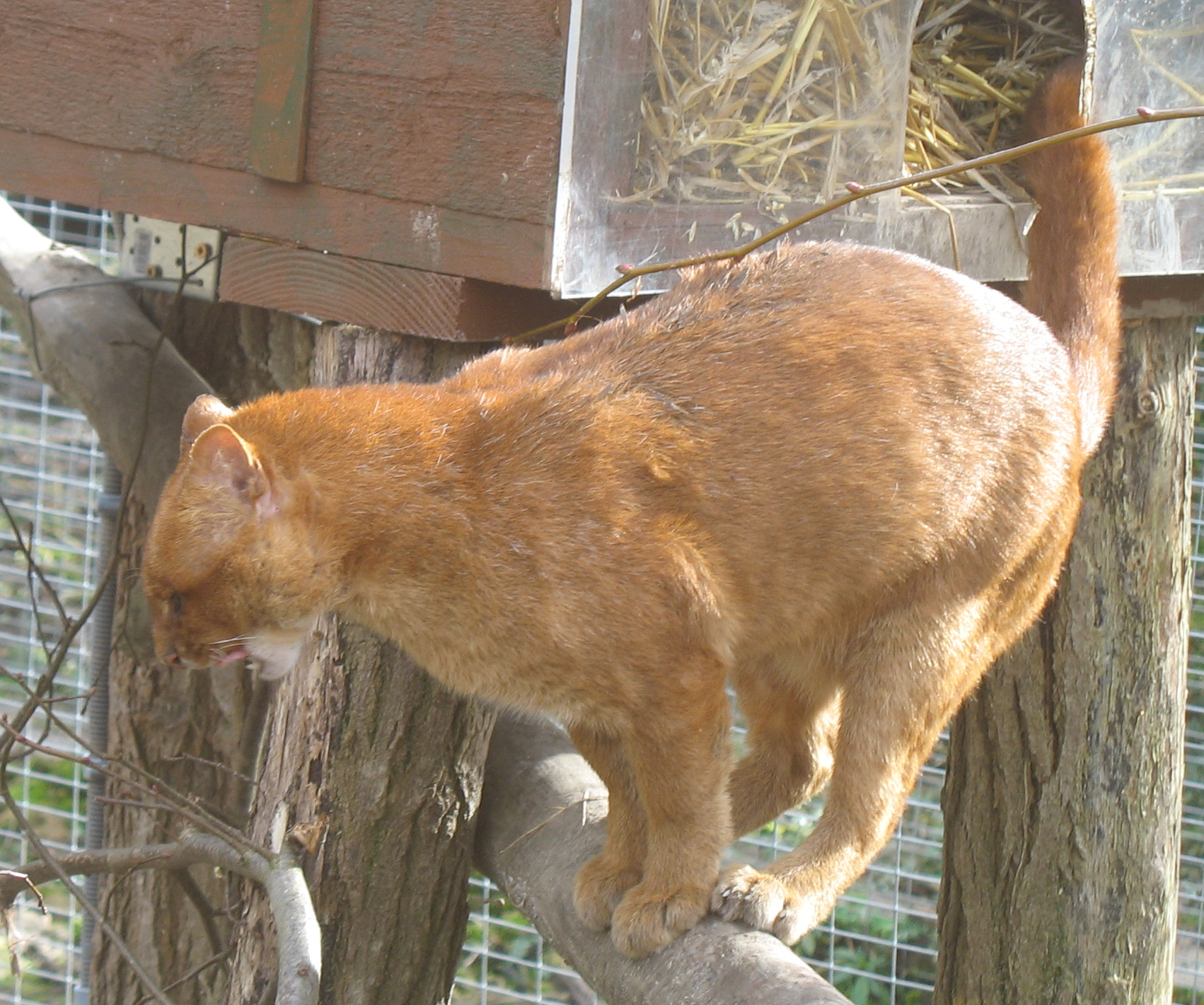
Red morph

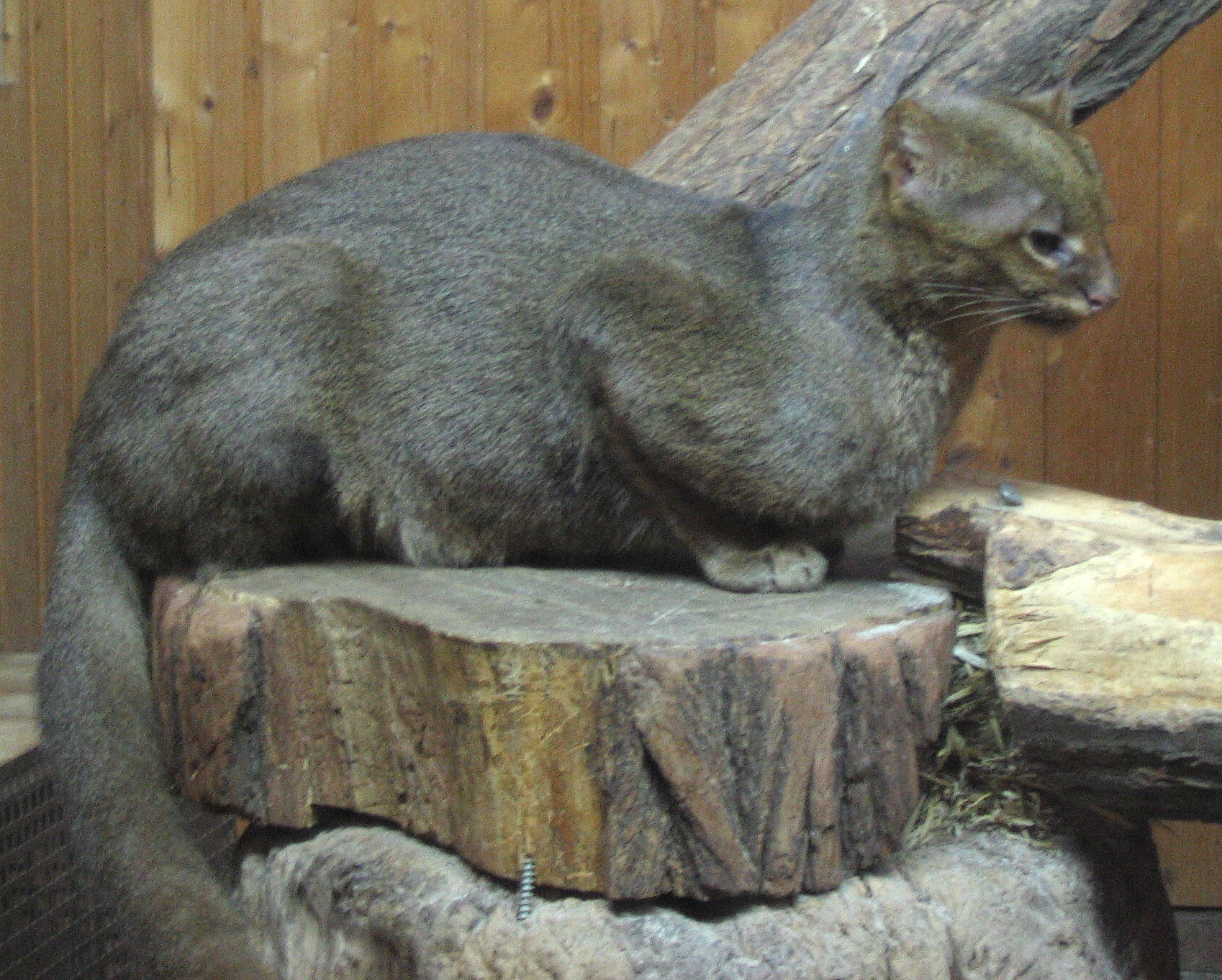
Gray morph

The jaguarundi is a medium-sized cat of slender build and uniform coloration that differs significantly from other neotropical cats—such as the small, spotted cats in the genus Leopardus—in its external appearance. This has been attributed to variations in its karyotype—the jaguarundi has 38 chromosomes, unlike the 36 in other small South American cats, and the chromosomal features resemble those of Old World cats such as the leopard cat (Prionailurus bengalensis). The jaguarundi has an elongated body with relatively short legs, a small, narrow head, small, round ears, a short snout and a long tail. The head-and-body length is between 53 and 77 cm (21 and 30 in); the strong, muscular tail is 31–52 cm (12–20 in) long. Around twice as large as the domestic cat, the jaguarundi reaches nearly 36 cm (14 in) at the shoulder and weighs 3.5–7 kg (7.7–15.4 lb), though larger individuals weighing around 9 kg (20 lb) have been reported. Males are slightly larger than females.

The coat is uniformly colored with at most a few faint markings on the face and the belly, though kittens are spotted for a short duration. Black and white marks on the lips and the snout, similar to those of the cougar, can be clearly seen in juveniles and some adults. Two color morphs are known, viz gray ranging from blackish to brownish-gray fur with a grizzled look due to bright and dark rings on individual hairs, and red ranging from foxy red to chestnut; but intermediate shades have also been reported, and individuals of both colors can be born in the same litter. Blackish brown individuals superficially resemble the tayra (Eira barbara), but the latter can be told apart by the clear, yellowish patch on the throat. The red morph is seen more often in dry, open areas. Melanistic individuals have been reported, but the coat is not completely black; the head and the throat are clearly paler than the rest of the body. The widely spaced ears are 2.5–4 cm (0.98–1.57 in) long without any spots on the back. The jaguarundi has 30 teeth with a dental formula of 3.1.3.13.1.2.1.

Among felids, the jaguarundi is closely similar to the flat-headed cat (Prionailurus planiceps), but has a longer body and proportionately longer legs, is heavier and lacks the dark markings on the cheeks of the flat-headed cat. Tawny jaguarundis bear a similar coloration to the larger cougar.

The diploid number of chromosomes in jaguarundi is 2n=38.

== Distribution and habitat ==
A jaguarundi in the Atlantic Forest in Brazil

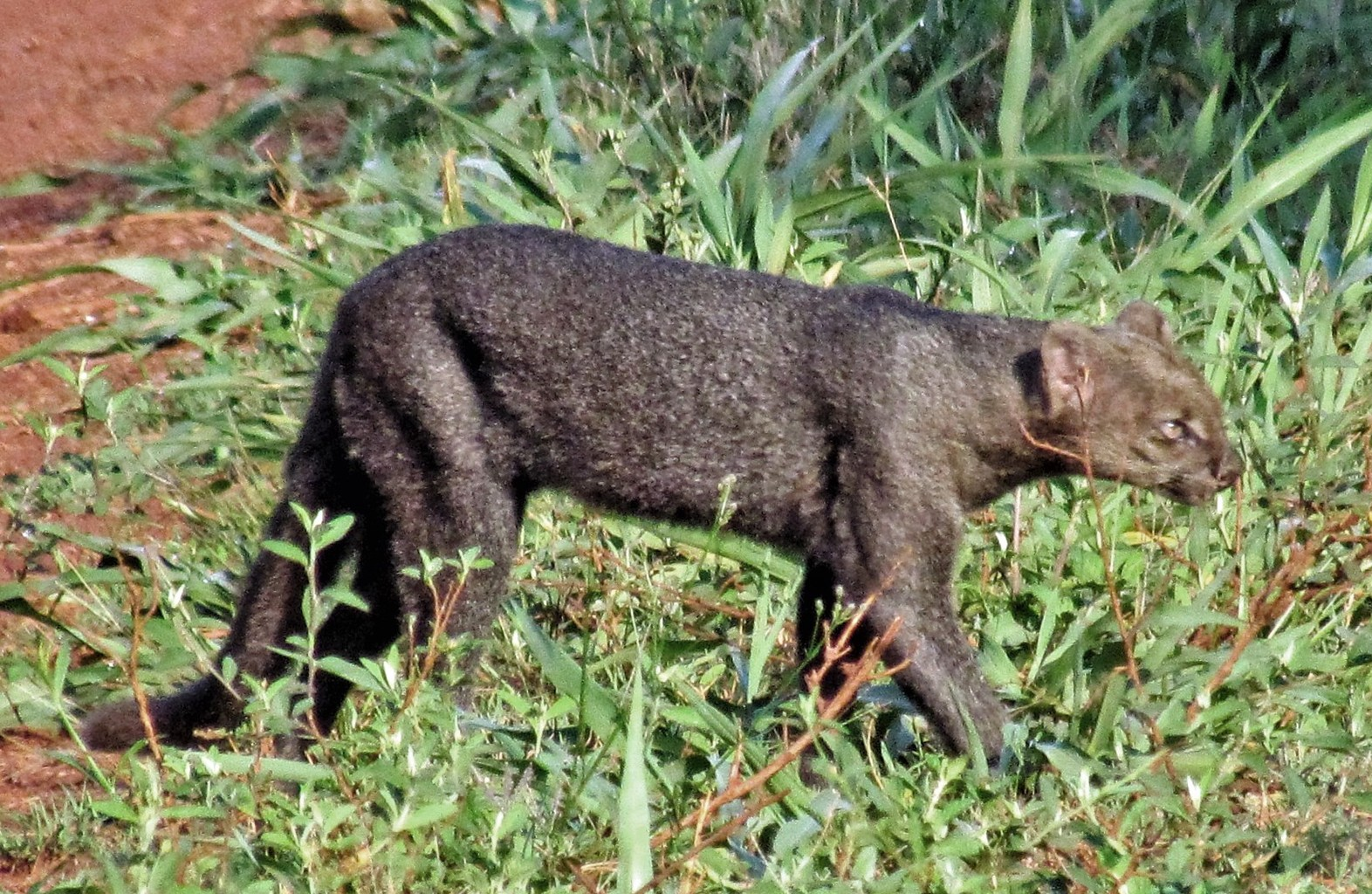
A jaguarundi in the wild, Misiones Province, Argentina

The jaguarundi inhabits a wide variety of habitats, from tropical rainforests and deciduous forests to deserts and thorn scrubs. It can also be found in cloud forests, mangroves and savannas. Unlike the sympatric margay, ocelot and oncilla, the jaguarundi can live in open areas as well. In open habitats the jaguarundi prefers areas with vegetative cover such as cacti, which would generally be difficult for potential predators to penetrate; there may be a few clearings at the periphery of such areas. Jaguarundis tend to stay close to a source of running water. The jaguarundi is noted for its resistance to environmental disturbances in its habitat; it can thrive in reforested areas. While commonly inhabiting elevations from lowlands up to 2,000 m (6,600 ft), this cat has been reported at elevations as high as 3,200 m (10,500 ft) in Colombia.

The range extends from central Argentina in the south to northern Mexico, through Central and South America east of the Andes, second only to the cougar among cats in the latitudinal extent of its distribution. However, not all parts of its range have been studied well. The jaguarundi is fairly common in Brazil, Peru, and Venezuela. It is possibly extirpated in the United States; a 1999 study refuted claims of sightings in Arizona, in the Huachuca Mountains in Santa Cruz County. The last specimen collected in the U.S. was a roadkill near Brownsville, Texas, in 1986. In 1994, the jaguarundi was thought to be represented in the lower Rio Grande Valley by no more than 15 individuals, and its survival there was doubtful. It was declared extinct in Texas in 2025, but is thought to still be present in Santa Ana National Wildlife Refuge.

Jaguarundis have been sighted in Florida since the early 20th century. Their presence there is attributed to a writer from Chiefland who at some point imported the animals from their native habitat and released them near his hometown and in other locations across the state. While no physical evidence is known, numerous credible sightings have been reported beginning in 1907. In 1977, W. T. Neill noted that reliable sightings had decreased and concluded that the population had declined. Jaguarundis have also been reported in the coastal area of Alabama since the 1980s, which may be evidence of the Florida population migrating northward. The jaguarundi has also been recorded in Cerro Largo in Uruguay, where its presence was doubted.

== Behavior and ecology ==
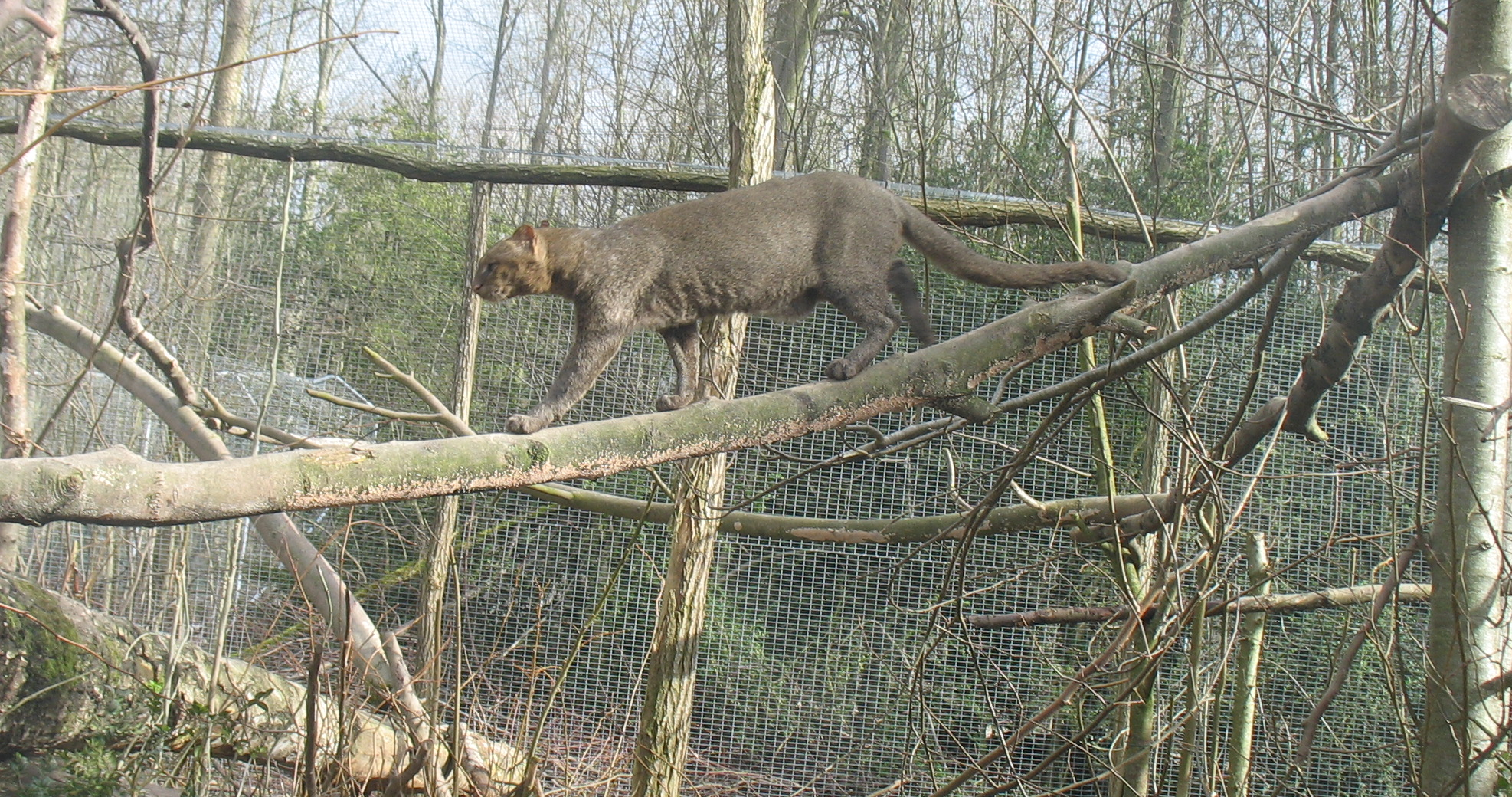
Jaguarundis are good climbers and can easily walk on branches.

The jaguarundi is shy and reclusive, and apparently very cautious of traps. There have been only a few radio telemetry studies of jaguarundis in Belize, Brazil and Mexico. Though activity has been observed throughout the day and at night, jaguarundis seem to prefer hunting during daytime and evening hours; for instance, a study in Belize reported that jaguarundis started moving before dawn and remained active through most of the day till sunset with a peak in hunting from late morning to noon. The cat appears to be more diurnal than most other cats, especially spotted cats that tend to be more active at night. The jaguarundi can swim across medium-sized rivers; one in Bolivia was recorded swimming across the Tuichi River. Jaguarundis are efficient climbers as well, but hunt mainly on ground; the coat color works as a good camouflage for terrestrial activity. They can leap up to 2 m (6 ft 7 in) into the air to catch birds. Predators recorded for jaguarundis include Mexican west coast boa constrictors, cougars and domestic dogs. Parasites such as hookworms (Ancylostoma species), tapeworms (such as Spirometra and Toxocara species) and the lung fluke have been found in jaguarundis.

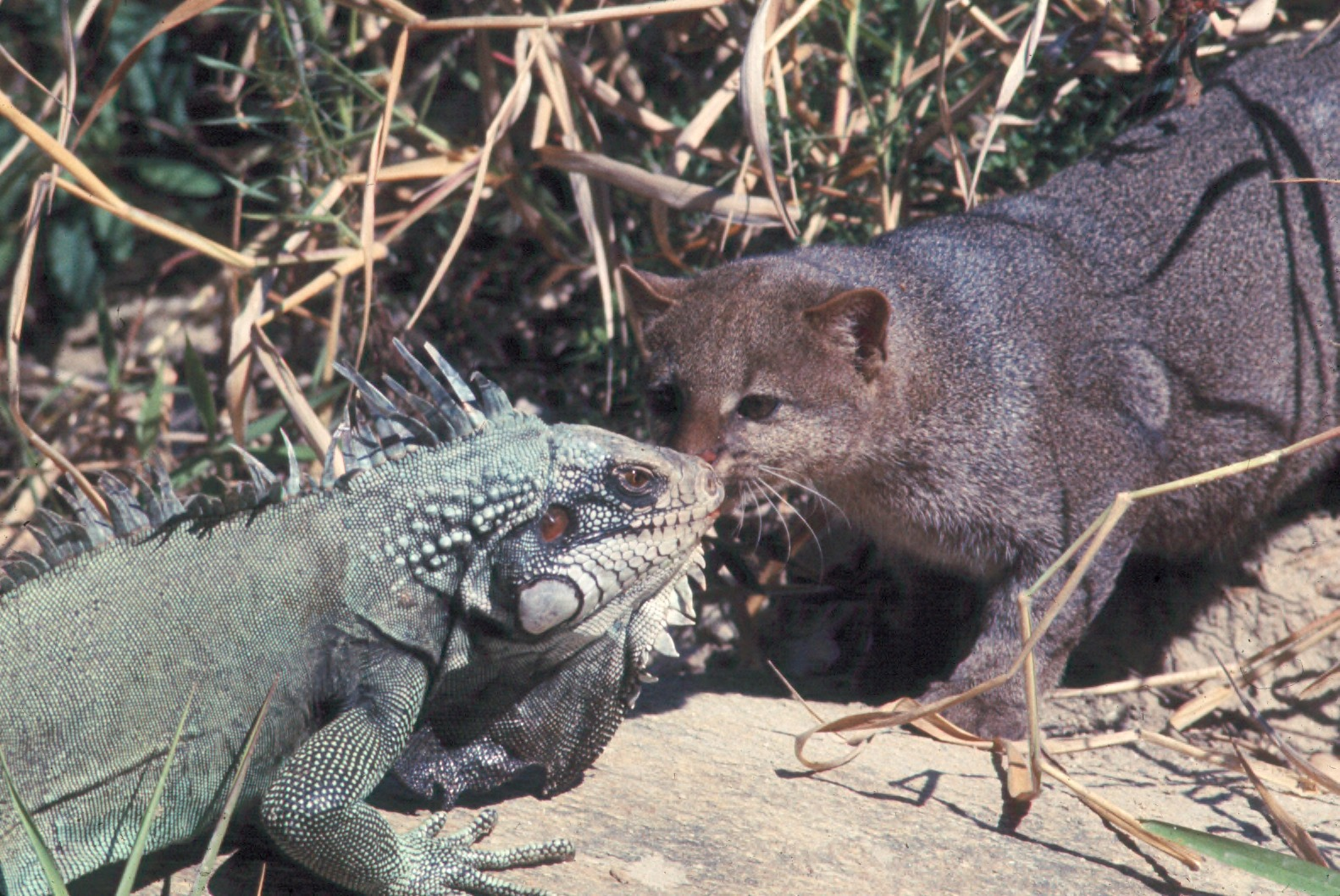
Jaguarundi with iguana

Studies have mostly observed jaguarundis alone or in pairs; pairs could probably be formed between mothers and older kittens or between individuals of opposite sexes during the mating season. Individuals in captivity have been found to be more gregarious. Home ranges tend to be large; a study in Brazil recorded home ranges 1.4–18 km^{2} (0.54–6.95 sq mi) in size for females, while those of males measured 8.5–25.3 km^{2} (3.3–9.8 sq mi) in area. Two males in Belize were recorded to have exceptionally large home ranges spanning an area of 88 km^{2} (34 sq mi) and 100 km^{2} (39 sq mi), while the home range of a female in the same region measured 13–20 km^{2} (5.0–7.7 sq mi) in size. Population densities are typically low, around 0.01 to 0.05/km^{2} (0.026 to 0.129/sq mi) in Brazil, though Tamaulipas (Mexico) and the Llanos in Costa Rica and Venezuela have recorded figures as high as 0.2/km^{2} (0.52/sq mi).

Marking behavior could serve as a means of olfactory or visual communication among jaguarundis; individuals in captivity have been observed scraping areas with their hind feet (sometimes with urination), clawing on logs, rubbing objects with their heads and leaving feces uncovered. Social behavior such as grooming, growling and sniffing has been recorded. The jaguarundi has a broad vocal repertoire; 13 different calls have been recorded including chattering, purring, screaming, a 'wah-wah' call, whistling, yapping and a peculiar bird-like chirp. In captivity, females in estrus have been observed making faint sounds as they scent mark the area around their enclosures.

=== Diet ===
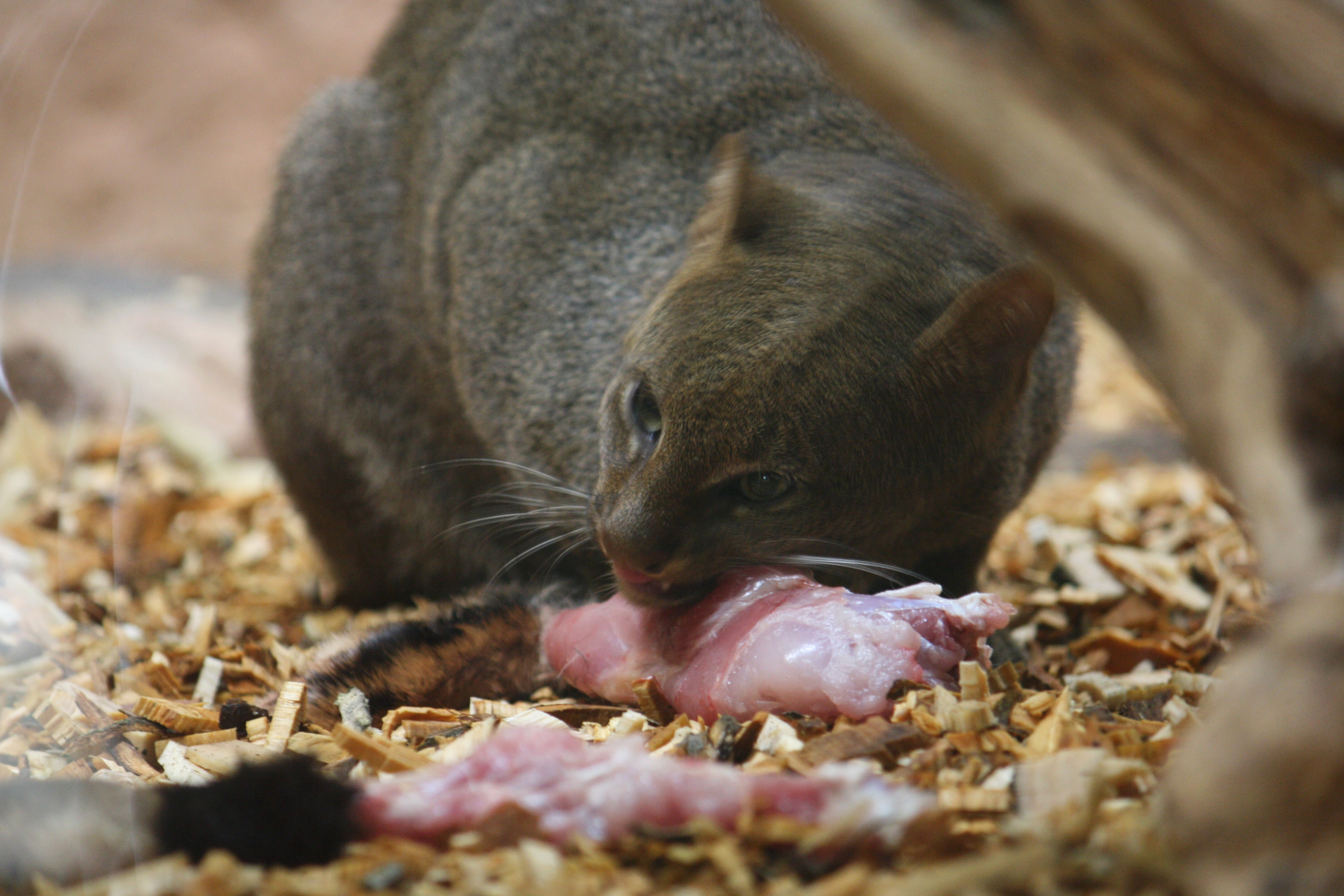
Jaguarundis are generalist carnivores.

The jaguarundi typically feeds on small-sized prey weighing less than 1 kg (2.2 lb), including ground-feeding birds, reptiles, frogs, arthropods, rodents and small mammals. Jaguarundis will also take larger prey such as domestic poultry, fish, marmosets, rabbits and opossums; a study recorded small deer (possibly carrion) in the diet. Vegetation such as grasses have also been recorded in their diet. A study showed jaguarundis take 400 g (14 oz) of vertebrate prey on an average every day. The jaguarundi seems to have a strong preference for mammals, as evidenced by an analysis of 14 papers, where it was found that nearly two thirds of its diet comprised small mammals. In particular, rodents of the genus Oryzomys, Sigmodon and Zygodontomys were found to be the most targeted prey items in several range countries. These rodents made up the bulk of the jaguarundi's diet in Venezuela, the Atlantic forests, the Cockscomb Basin and the southern Pacific dry forests. The second most targeted mammalian prey were mice belonging to the genera Reithrodontomys, Peromyscus and Liomys. On rare occasions, jaguarundis have been recorded consuming larger mammals such as the common opossum and common tapeti. The broad array of prey recorded for the jaguarundi across its range and varying proportions of different prey in its diet could indicate that the cat tends to feed on the most abundant and easily catchable prey in the area.

=== Reproduction ===
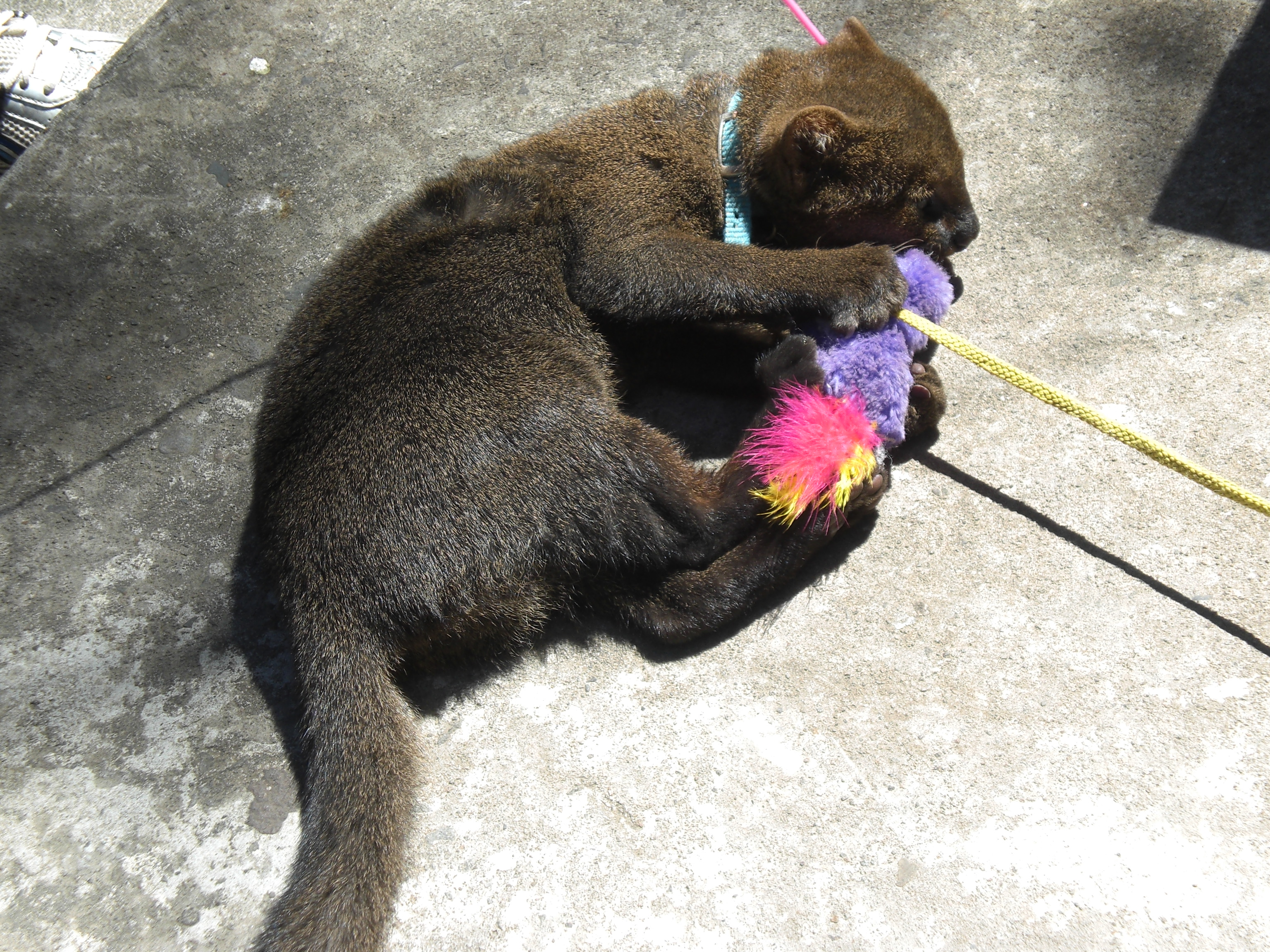
Jaguarundi kitten with toy, Paradise Garden, Boquete, Panama

Jaguarundis have been observed mating all year round, with peaks at different times of the year across the range; for instance, in Mexico breeding peaks in January and March. Estrus lasts three to five days, marked by the female regularly rolling onto her back and spraying urine. Sexually mature males will pursue the female, not reacting to any aggressive behavior from her side. As in many other felids, the male bites the fur on the female's neck on mounting; the female lets out a loud scream on penetration.

After a gestation period of 70 to 75 days, a litter of one to four kittens is born in a den constructed in a dense thicket, hollow tree, or similar cover. The kittens are covered well with fur and the underside is marked with spots, which disappear as they age; the coat color gradually changes as the kittens grow older. The mother starts bringing solid food for the kittens when they are around three weeks old, but they simply play with it until the mother ultimately ingests it. Kittens are capable of taking solid food like birds and guinea pigs at around six weeks. Jaguarundis become sexually mature at one to three years of age. Lifespan up to 15 years has been recorded in captivity.

== Threats and conservation ==
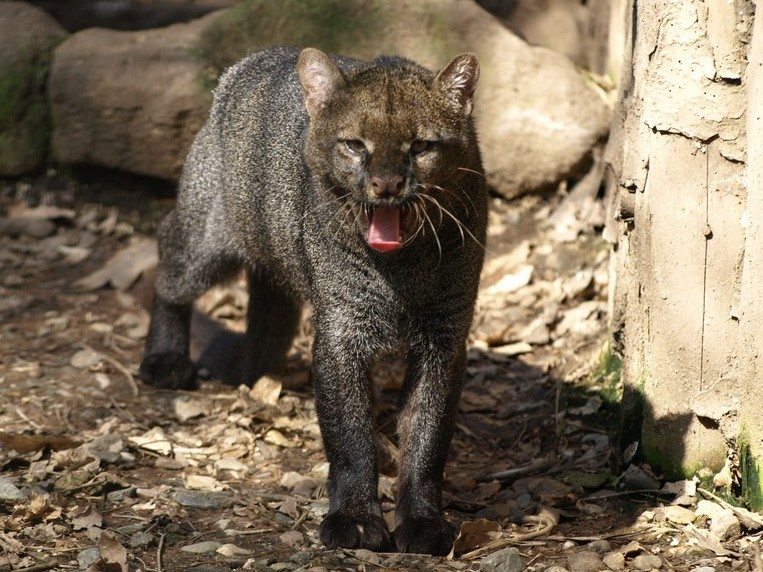
In the Děčín zoo, Czech Republic

The jaguarundi has been listed as near threatened on the IUCN Red List since 2026. Mexican populations, except those in the northeast, appear to be stable. The huge protected areas in the Amazon Basin are probably the only conservation units that can sustain long-term viable populations. IUCN Red List assessors noted that it should be listed as Near Threatened, but the data were not sufficient to extend this classification throughout the jaguarundi's range. The jaguarundi is not particularly sought after for its fur due to its poor quality and low value, but it is suffering decline due to habitat loss.

Other threats include risks of habitat fragmentation and persecution for killing poultry. The North and Central American jaguarundi populations are listed in CITES Appendix I and all the other populations are listed in CITES Appendix II. Populations in the US are protected under the Endangered Species Act; the Texas Parks and Wildlife Department has expressed concern that its presence in South Texas may be imperiled due to loss of the cat's native habitat. Populations in Mexico are listed under the Mexican Official Norm NOM-059-SEMARNAT-2010.

Hunting jaguarundi is restricted in Peru and banned in Argentina, Belize, Brazil, Bolivia, Colombia, Costa Rica, French Guiana, Guatemala, Honduras, Mexico, Panama, Paraguay, Suriname, Uruguay, United States, and Venezuela.
