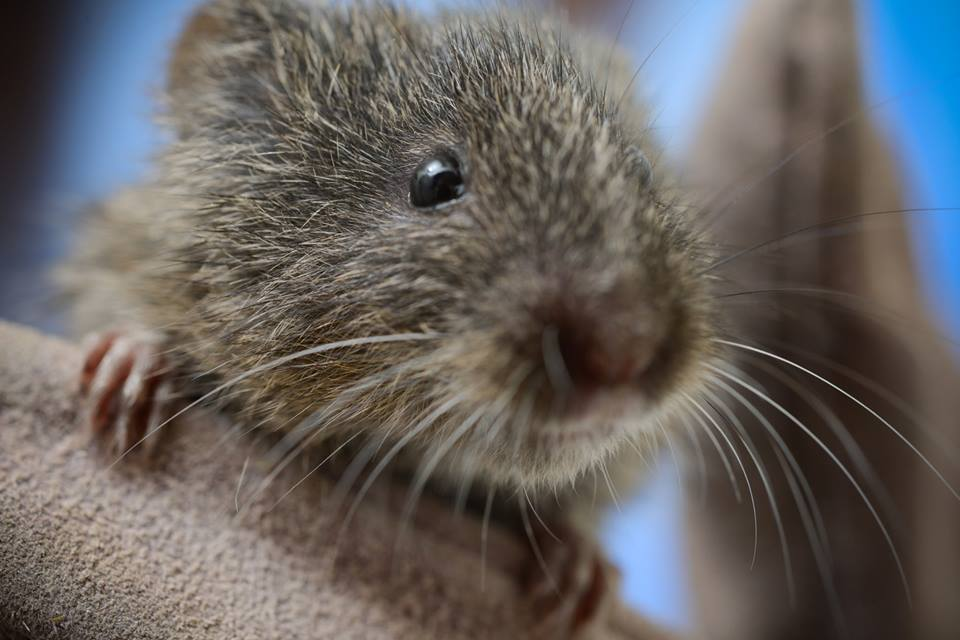

Conservation status
- Endangered (ESA)

Scientific classification
- Kingdom: Animalia
- Phylum: Chordata
- Class: Mammalia
- Order: Rodentia
- Family: Cricetidae
- Subfamily: Arvicolinae
- Genus: Microtus
- Species: M. californicus
- Subspecies: M. c. scirpensis

Trinomial name
- Microtus californicus scirpensis Bailey, 1900

= Amargosa vole =

Subspecies of rodent

The Amargosa vole (Microtus californicus scirpensis) is one of 17 subspecies of the California vole (M. californicus). The most closely related subspecies is M. californicus vallicola.

== Description ==
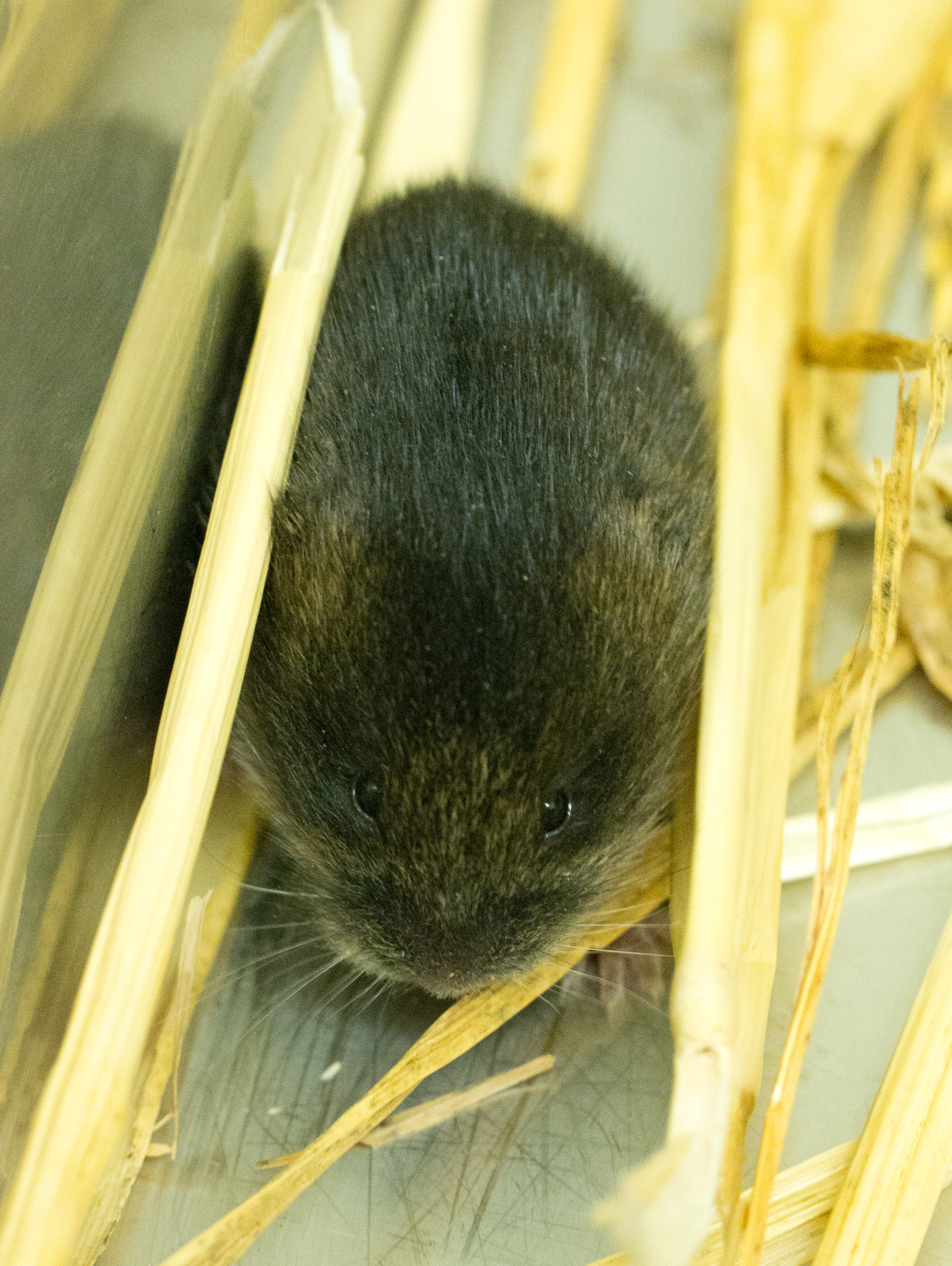

The Amargosa vole is recognized by the characteristic long, low profile of all voles. It has gray feet and whiskers, and its back is covered by dark, blackish fur. This subspecies has a bicolored tail that exhibits black on the top and gray on the underside. They are a sexually dimorphic species, in which the males are longer and heavier than the females of the subspecies. The dental formula of Amargosa voles is 1.0.0.31.0.0.3, meaning there is one incisor in each of the upper and lower quadrants, no canines or premolars, and three molars in each of the upper and lower quadrants. They are characterized by an opening in the palatine bone directly behind the incisors.

== Distribution and habitat ==
Amargosa voles have a very small range, limited only to certain parts of California. They are endemic to parts of the Mojave Desert in Inyo County. Their current range is mostly contained along a 10-mile (16 km) stretch of the Amargosa River and its associated tributaries and marshes. Although their historic range is not fully understood, it is thought they have always had a very small range, limited by life history requirements.

Amargosa voles have very specific habitat requirements. They live only along the Amargosa River in its associated tributary and marsh ecosystems on land with less than a 20 percent grade. The marshes in which they reside are typically one to five acres in size. Their habitat is unique; the landscape is a matrix of spring-fed marshes and tributaries that are naturally fragmented and isolated by inhospitable desert terrain. This subspecies requires permanent standing water and medium to dense vegetation. It is evident that the dominant plant preferred by this subspecies is bulrush (Scirpus olneyi), however, other plant species are also frequently found in ecosystems where Amargosa voles are known to live, including seepweed (Suaeda torreyana), arrowweed (Pluchea sericea), quailbush (Atriplex lentiformis), southern reed (Phragmites australis), and saltgrass (Distichlis spicata). It is estimated that there is only 247 acres (1.00 km^{2}) of land that meets the habitat requirements of the Amargosa vole within their range.

== Diet and foraging strategy ==
Herbaceous vegetation such as grasses and forbs make up the majority of the Amargosa vole's diet, but they may also rely on roots and seeds throughout certain times of the year. When harvesting the seed heads from grasses and forbs, individuals will often stand on their hind feet and chew off the herbaceous stem, causing the seeds to fall into their reach. Around dusk and dawn is when they are usually most active, but during extremely hot, dry weather, they adjust their foraging strategy to occur mostly at night.

== Population structure ==
Amargosa voles are a subspecies that is active year-round; they have no period of hibernation. Intraspecific interactions are frequent for Amargosa voles and can be attributed to their polygynous social system. They can found living in burrows in family groups of up to one male, several females, and their offspring. The female home range averages 0.02 acres (81 m^{2}) and the male home range averages 0.03 acres (120 m^{2}), although the females generally travel longer distances than males throughout non-breeding season. Especially during peak breeding season in March and April, males tend to be territorial and make an effort to exclude other males from their home ranges. Male and female home ranges, however, may overlap. Daily ranges of these animals is substantially smaller, with individuals traveling only 16–17 feet (4.9–5.2 m) from the burrow entrance to meet most of its life history needs. Daily movements and home range sizes vary somewhat with the environment and population density. Voles disperse throughout their lifetime, but dispersal is often limited by fragmentation of their habitat.

== Reproduction ==
The Amargosa vole has a life span of around one year. Several factors allow them to have very high reproductive success with huge numbers of litters produced, despite their short life spans. The Amargosa vole possesses the ability to reproduce year-round, but highest rates of pregnancy are usually throughout March and April. The voles require green vegetation for reproduction so the timing of peak gestation corresponds with plant emergence in the spring and is partially controlled by timing of first rainfall. Gestation in this subspecies lasts 21 days, with the offspring (usually 4-5 young) being weaned 14 days after that. Females experience an estrus cycle immediately after giving birth that makes them especially receptive to postpartum copulations and allows them to have many successive litters. Sexual maturity is reached by young females very early; they can have litters when they are as young as 3 weeks old. Males become sexually mature at just 6 weeks. The third molars erupt after 22 days and this, along with molt patterns, can be used to age individuals.

== Decline ==
One major threat to the Amargosa vole is destruction of habitat. In the past, the marsh habitat has been intentionally destroyed for development or creating new grazing land for livestock. Other actions, such as building roads and railroads, have indirectly affected the vital marsh habitat by altering the hydrology between the river and marshes. This has also increased fragmentation in the landscape, making dispersal between suitable habitats a challenge. Many of the Amargosa vole metapopulations are already reliant on flooding events to not become completely isolated, and increasing the fragmentation will exacerbate the issue. Because of population isolation, there are genetic issues associated with the conservation efforts, with the potential for inbreeding and genetic homogeneity to occur.

Introduction of invasive species is also a threat to the Amargosa vole. One extremely aggressive plant, tamarisk (Tamarix spp.), changes the vegetative community and the hydrology of the marsh. It has the potential to use so much water that it changes or even eliminates the standing water from the vole habitat. Two other introduced species, house cats and house mice, do not alter the ecosystem but directly impact the vole. House cats are known predators of the vole, but the relationship between the Amargosa vole and house mice is not as well understood.

Other potential threats to the vole are groundwater pumping and development and implementation of water diversion structures, which alter the flow and hydrology of the marshes and reduce the amount of available surface water that feeds that marshes on which the Amargosa voles rely.

== Conservation ==
The Amargosa vole is listed as endangered in the state of California and federally by the United States Fish and Wildlife Service. Additionally, it is listed as vulnerable by the International Union for Conservation of Nature. Originally declared extinct in 1976, it was rediscovered three years later when 21 individuals were captured during sampling of potential habitat. Today, the population is thought to consist of only 67 individuals based on the most recent sampling efforts.

Critical habitat was designated for the subspecies in 1984, when it was first federally listed. Although its habitat is naturally fragmented, human disturbance does not help the situation. If the suitable habitat patches become too isolated, gene flow stops occurring, and the subspecies could be even more threatened. One conservation priority is to maintain habitat between marsh patches in order to promote gene flow and preserve genetic diversity.

One benefit to conservation of this subspecies is that most of the Amargosa vole's range is on land owned by the Bureau of Land Management, The Nature Conservancy, and the California State Lands Commission. This land has been set aside as an Area of Critical Environmental Concern, which prevents many of the actions that continue to threaten the subspecies, including burning and grazing.
