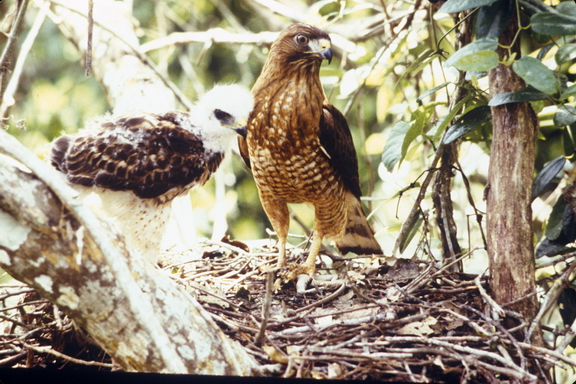
- Puerto Rican broad-winged hawk (guaraguao de bosque)

Conservation status
- Endangered (ESA)

Scientific classification
- Kingdom: Animalia
- Phylum: Chordata
- Class: Aves
- Order: Accipitriformes
- Family: Accipitridae
- Genus: Buteo
- Species: B. platypterus
- Subspecies: B. p. brunnescens

Trinomial name
- Buteo platypterus brunnescens Danforth & Smyth, 1935
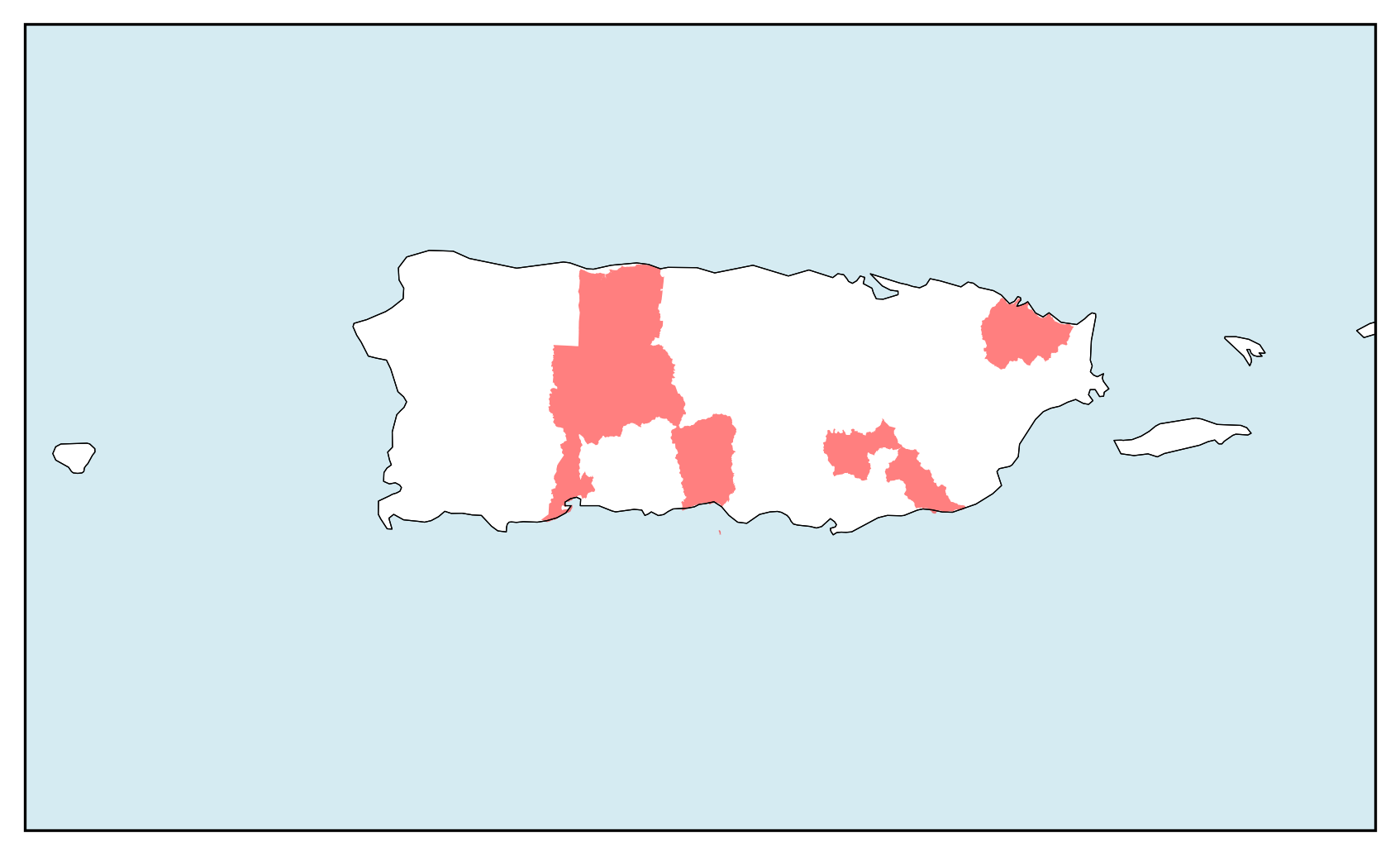
- current range in Puerto Rico

= Puerto Rican broad-winged hawk =

Subspecies of bird

The Puerto Rican broad-winged hawk (Buteo platypterus brunnescens) is an endangered subspecies of the broad-winged hawk (B. platypterus). It is a small hawk that occurs in Puerto Rico, inhabiting the Toro Negro State Forest. It is restricted to the montane forests of the Cordillera Central, Sierra de Cayey, and Sierra de Luquillo. It was federally listed as endangered on September 9, 1994. This species occurs in elfin woodland, sierra palm, caimitillo-granadillo, and tabonuco forest types of the Río Abajo Commonwealth Forest, Carite Commonwealth Forest, and El Yunque National Forest as well as within hardwood plantations, shade coffee plantations, and mature secondary forests. In 1994, the Puerto Rican broad-winged hawk population was estimated at 125 individuals islandwide.

Its Spanish common name is guaragüao de bosque.

== See also ==
- Birds of Puerto Rico
- Fauna of Puerto Rico
- List of endemic fauna of Puerto Rico
