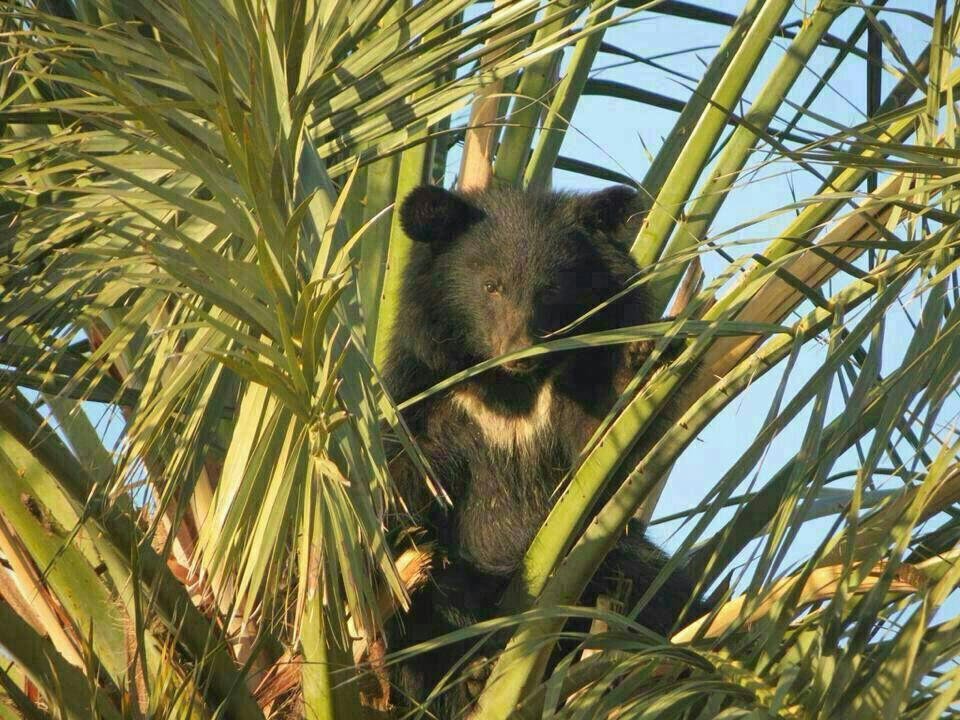

Conservation status
- Endangered (ESA)

Scientific classification
- Kingdom: Animalia
- Phylum: Chordata
- Class: Mammalia
- Order: Carnivora
- Family: Ursidae
- Subfamily: Ursinae
- Genus: Ursus
- Species: U. thibetanus
- Subspecies: U. t. gedrosianus

Trinomial name
- Ursus thibetanus gedrosianus Blanford, 1877
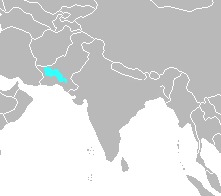

Synonyms
- Selenarctos thibetanus gedrosianus

= Balochistan black bear =

Subspecies of carnivore

The Balochistan black bear (Ursus thibetanus gedrosianus) is a subspecies of the Asian black bear occurring in the Toba Kakar Range of southern Pakistan and Iran. It has an unusually thin coat and lives in a warmer climate than most of the other subspecies. It is also more frugivorous than the other subspecies.

== Characteristics ==
The Balochistan black bear has short, coarse fur ranging in colour from black to reddish brown. It is smaller than the other subspecies with a head and body length of 80 cm (31 in) including tail.

== Distribution and habitat ==
The Balochistan black bear inhabits the hilly areas of the Balochistan province in southwest Pakistan. It has been recorded in the Sulaiman Mountains, Khuzdar District and Kharan District.

== Behaviour and ecology ==
This species is omnivorous, as it eats fruits, insects, and small reptiles. It is also known for breaking logs in the hunt of grubs. Though they are omnivorous, their preferred diet is fruits, especially Indian olives and Ber.

== Threats ==
Balochistan black bears are captured by locals who try to raise them as pets for circuses and bear-baiting. In bear baiting, claws and canines of each bear are extracted and they are left to fight dogs. This practice was made unlawful and prohibited in 2001 but still occurs illegally to some extent. Habitat loss is a major threat to this species because of illegal logging, the growth of human population that leads to expansion of villages, development of highways network, and installation of power stations in the wild.

It is now considered extinct in most of the area. Deforestation and loss of habitat is the greatest problem it faces. Local and nomad herders let their cattle graze in the bear territory and end up in killing the native bears, blaming them for the killing of their livestock. Poaching for body parts like gall bladders for medicines is also a threat to this subspecies.

== Conservation ==
In Pakistan, the Balochistan black bear is considered Critically Endangered.
