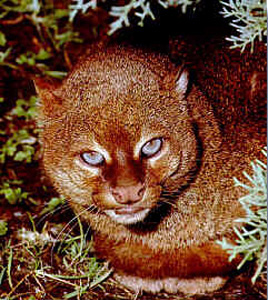

Scientific classification
- Kingdom: Animalia
- Phylum: Chordata
- Class: Mammalia
- Infraclass: Placentalia
- Order: Carnivora
- Family: Felidae
- Genus: Herpailurus
- Species: H. yagouaroundi
- Population: Gulf Coast jaguarundi

Synonyms
- Puma yagouaroundi subsp. cacomitli (Berlandier, 1859); Herpailurus yagouaroundi subsp. cacomitli (Berlandier, 1859); Herpailurus yaguarondi subsp. cacomitli (Berlandier, 1859); Felis apache Mearns, 1901; Felis cacomitli Berlandier, 1859; Felis yagouaroundi subsp. cacomitli Berlandier, 1859

= Gulf Coast jaguarundi =

Subspecies of carnivore

The Gulf Coast jaguarundi is an endangered population of the jaguarundi (Herpailurus yagouaroundi) once ranging from southern Texas in the United States to eastern Mexico. The cat prefers dense shrubland and woodland, yet has been hampered by habitat loss.

Since 2017, this population is no longer recognised as a jaguarundi subspecies.

== Description ==
This cat is larger than a normal domestic cat, but smaller than a cougar. It has been compared to a weasel or an otter. Their fur is of a dark-brown or grayish color because they reside in low-light areas such as forests and thick shrubs.

== Distribution and habitat ==
The Gulf Coast jaguarundi ranges from southern Texas in the United States south to Veracruz and San Luis Potosí in eastern Mexico. This cat looks like a large weasel or otter with a coat in one of three color phases: black, reddish-brown or brownish-gray. Darker varieties tend to be found in darker places, like forests, than those who are lighter in hue, which prefer more open areas. It is considered probably locally extinct in Texas and the United States as a whole by most sources, including the IUCN Red List.

It inhabits the Western Gulf coastal grasslands, Tamaulipan mezquital, and Tamaulipan matorral. Its preferred habitat are regions of dense, thorny scrub, especially near water, composed of plants such as spiny hackberry, brazilian bluewood, desert yaupon, Berlandier's wolfberry, lotebush, Texas goatbush, whitebrush, catclaw acacia, blackbrush acacia, velvetleaf lantana, Texas lignum-vitae, cenizo, elbowbush, and Texas persimmon.

Habitat loss is the main reason for the increase in mortality for the jaguarundi. Not enough information has been gathered about the jaguarundi, and because these animals are not widely studied their significance is unclear.

== Ecology ==
=== Reproduction ===
Mating season for the jaguarundi is believed to be in the months of November and December. A female jaguarundi's pregnancy cycle, or gestation period, lasts about 70–75 days. At the time of birth, the female will have anywhere between 1–4 kittens, each weighing 4–7 kilograms. Like their relative, the cougar, the kittens between the ages of 0 and 12 weeks will have spots on their coats; however, around month 3 or 4, the kittens' spots are lost. At 6 weeks of age, the cats will begin eating solid foods, usually rodents. Shortly after, they leave their mothers, and within 2–3 years, achieve sexual maturity. Their life expectancy is very impressive, ranging from 16–22 years in captivity. In the wild, its lifespan is approximately 10–15 years, a feat most attributable to their well-protected den.

=== Diet ===
The jaguarundi is a carnivore. The animals they hunt tend to be relatively small animals. Small mammals, birds, frogs, and fish are a few of the wide variety of prey that the jaguarundi feeds on. These cats may have adapted to eating a wide variety of animals because of the scarcity of food.

== Threats ==
The Southwestern Association of Naturalists, an organization of 791 scientists (at time of publication) specializing in the zoology, botany, and ecology of southwestern USA and Mexico, published a resolution in 2008 expressing opposition to the Mexico–United States barrier "based on sound and accurate scientific knowledge" and its negative impact on "many rare, threatened and endangered species", "particularly endangered mammals such as the jaguar, ocelot, jaguarundi, and Sonoran pronghorn" citing literature within their resolution. Over 2500 scientists from 43 countries (including 1472 from the USA and 616 from Mexico) also published a statement in 2018 stating that the border wall will have "significant consequences for biodiversity" and that "already-built sections of the wall are reducing the area, quality, and connectivity of plant and animal habitats and are compromising more than a century of binational investment in conservation", citing published scientific studies therein. A few patches of good habitat remain in south Texas, despite having been largely destroyed by the construction of the border fence.

== Conservation efforts ==
The United States Fish and Wildlife Service listed Gulf Coast jaguarundi as endangered in 1976. The agency has proposed steps to reestablish jaguarundi populations, but has so far failed to fulfill many of them. Some of these steps include assessing habitat and land connectivity to support viable populations, developing survey techniques to ascertain their status and better understand their ecological and conservation needs, and developing partnerships to help promote jaguarundi conservation. The biggest threat to the Gulf Coast jaguarundis is the Mexico–U.S. border fence, as it fragments populations and prevents migration. Additionally, jaguarundis are facing habitat loss, so the Fish and Wildlife Service is planting shrubs and plants found in a jaguarundi's natural environment in the Rio Grande Valley in Texas.
