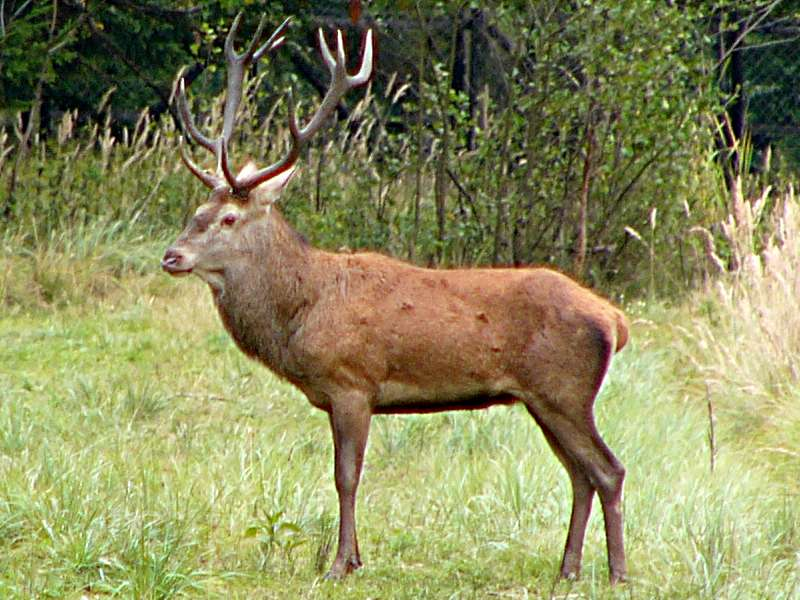

Scientific classification
- Kingdom: Animalia
- Phylum: Chordata
- Class: Mammalia
- Order: Artiodactyla
- Family: Cervidae
- Genus: Cervus
- Species: C. elaphus
- Subspecies: C. e. hippelaphus

Trinomial name
- Cervus elaphus hippelaphus Erxleben, 1777

= Central European red deer =

Subspecies of deer

The Central European red deer or common red deer (Cervus elaphus hippelaphus) is a subspecies of red deer native to central Europe. The deer's habitat ranges from France, Switzerland, Austria, Germany, and Denmark to the western Carpathians. It was introduced to New Zealand, Australia, Chile, and Argentina.

== Description ==
Found throughout most of Europe, the deer is light-colored, with a light-colored rump patch bordering with black. The smaller Spanish red deer (Cervus elaphus hispanicus) is greyer, while the Norwegian red deer (Cervus elaphus atlanticus) is smaller and paler. The Mesola red deer has been proposed as another subspecies.
