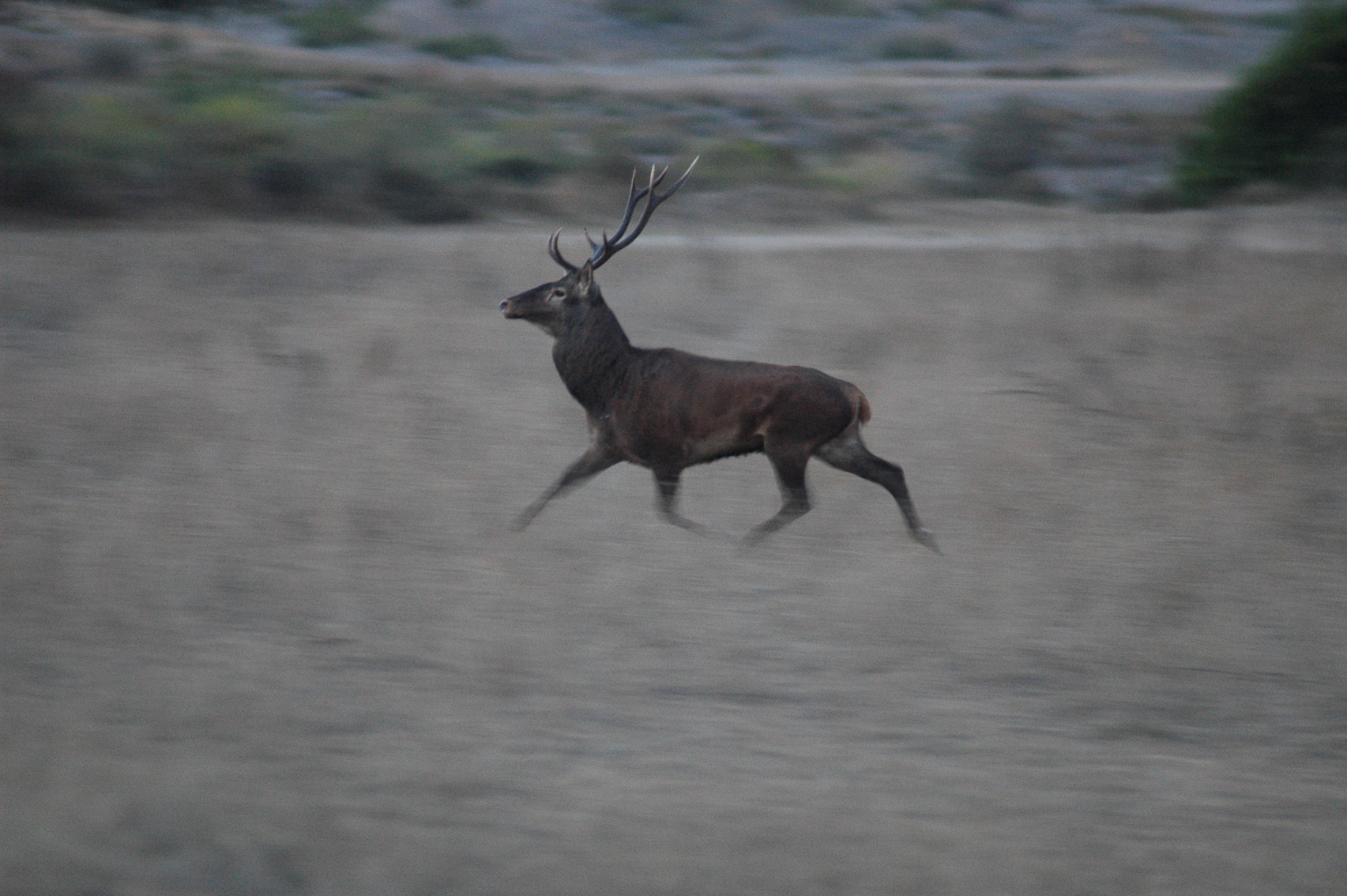
- A male Corsican red deer

Conservation status
- Near Threatened (IUCN 3.1)

- Endangered (ESA)

Scientific classification
- Kingdom: Animalia
- Phylum: Chordata
- Class: Mammalia
- Order: Artiodactyla
- Family: Cervidae
- Genus: Cervus
- Species: C. elaphus
- Subspecies: C. e. corsicanus

Trinomial name
- Cervus elaphus corsicanus Erxleben, 1777

= Corsican red deer =

Subspecies of deer

The Corsican red deer (Cervus elaphus corsicanus), also known simply as the Corsican deer or Sardinian deer, is a subspecies of red deer (Cervus elaphus) found on the Mediterranean islands of Sardinia (Italy) and Corsica (France).

== Taxonomy ==
The Corsican red deer is closely related to the Barbary stag and to the Mesola red deer. The Tyrrhenian deer descend from an ancient population of Italian red deer, which were transported to Sardinia during the Late Neolithic and to Corsica shortly before Classical Antiquity.

== Characteristics ==
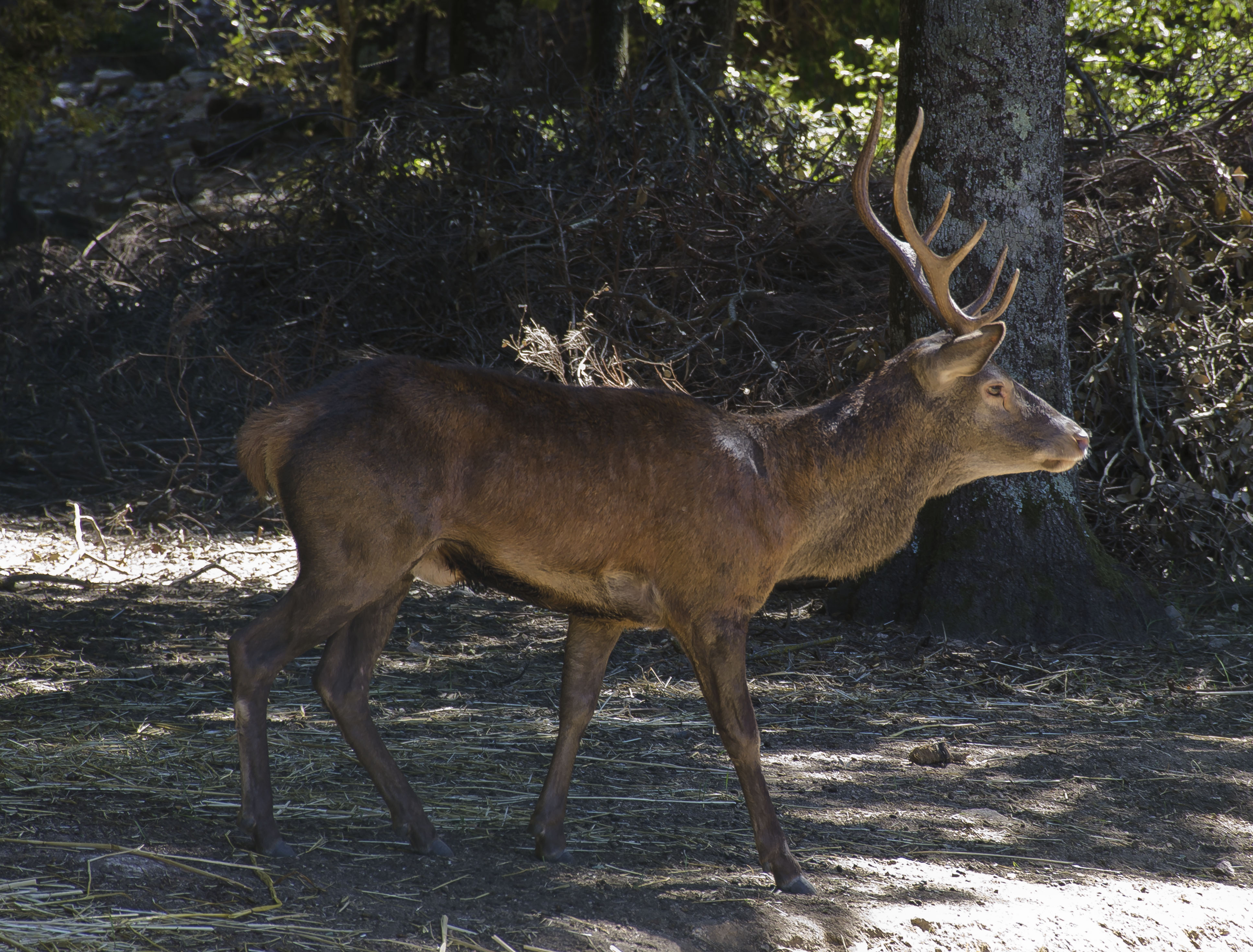
A male Corsican red deer

The Corsican red deer is smaller than most of the 16 subspecies of the red deer; it has shorter legs (possibly to better scramble up mountain sides) and a longer tail. The antlers are also simplified and shorter, typically less than 80 cm (31 in) in length. The coat is brownish. Life expectancy is 13–14 years. Males reach a height of 86 to 110 cm (34 to 43 in) and a weight of 100 to 110 kg (220 to 240 lb); while females measure 80 to 90 cm (31 to 35 in) and weigh 80 kg (180 lb).

== Reproduction ==
This subspecies reach sexual maturity at 2 years of age. Mating lasts from August to November and can involve mortal battles. The dominant male finally secures most of the mature females, typically 12 per male. After gestation, in May–July, females hide alone in the maquis (the dense vegetation) to deliver, typically a single birth per female. Males leave the matriarchal group following the reproductive period.

== Distribution and habitat ==
The Corsican red deer was introduced to the Tyrrhenian islands of Corsica and Sardinia during the Holocene by humans around 2500–3000 BC, replacing the now extinct endemic deer Praemegaceros cazioti, which had been present on the islands for over 450,000 years. Today, red deer live in the wild in sanctuaries on both islands; for example, it is bred in the Monte Arcosu Forest in Sardinia and in the Parc Naturel Régional de Corse, which covers almost 40% of the island, where it was reintroduced from Sardinia after its extinction in the 1970s.

== Conservation status ==
The subspecies gets its name from the island of Corsica from where it was, however, extirpated in the early 1970s. At that time, the less than 250 animals that still existed on Sardinia were protected and plans were elaborated for a reintroduction on Corsica. Captive breeding on the latter island began in 1985 and the population increased from 13 founders to 186 captive animals. Reintroduction could finally begin in 1998, and as of 2007, the Corsican population was about 250 individuals, with a total of about 1,000 for the subspecies, which has therefore been downgraded to near threatened on the IUCN Red List.

== See also ==
- Insular dwarfism
- Sardinian dhole
