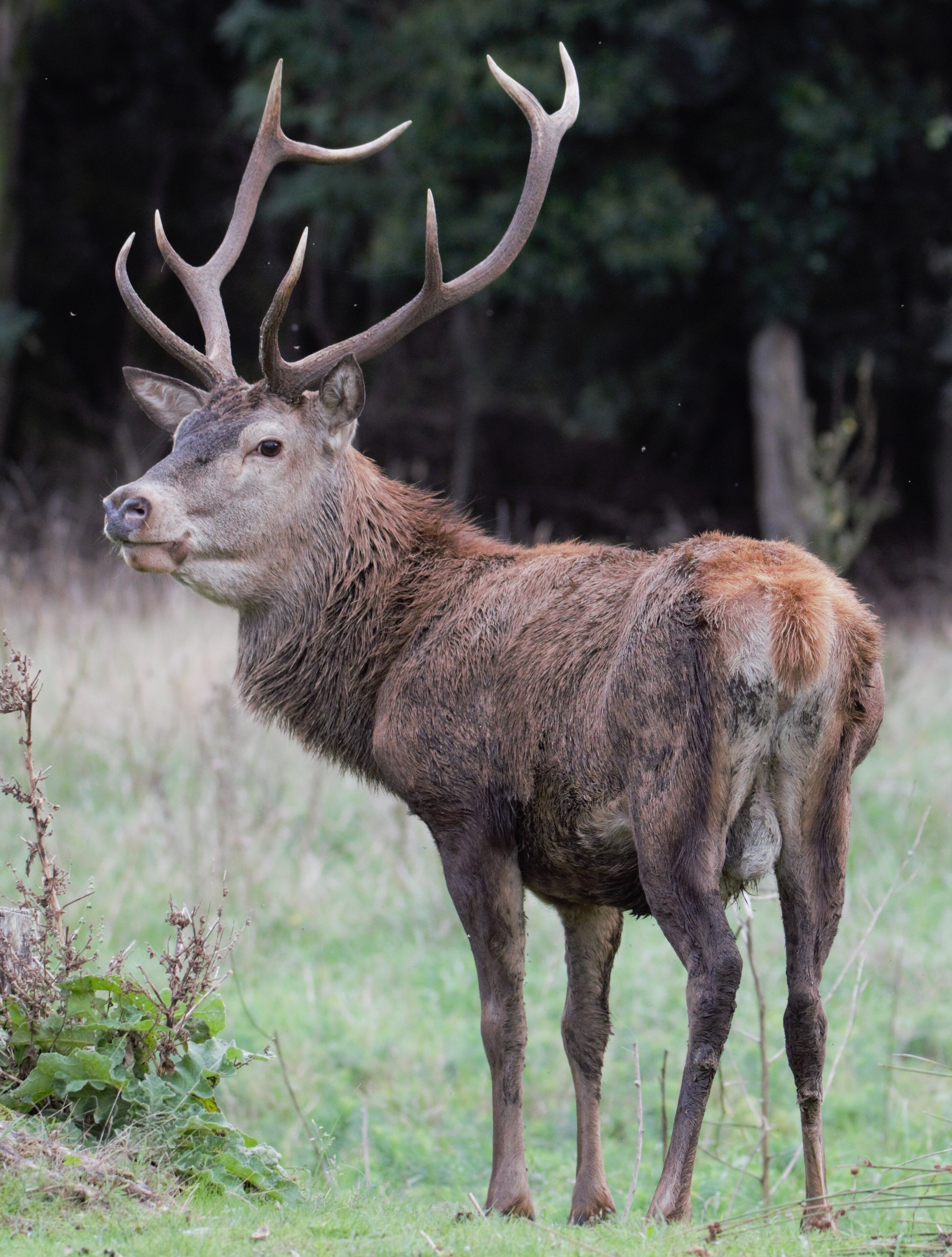

Scientific classification
- Kingdom: Animalia
- Phylum: Chordata
- Class: Mammalia
- Order: Artiodactyla
- Family: Cervidae
- Genus: Cervus
- Species: C. elaphus
- Subspecies: C. e. italicus

Trinomial name
- Cervus elaphus italicus Zachos et al, 2014

= Mesola red deer =

Subspecies of deer

The Mesola red deer (Cervus elaphus italicus), also known as the Italian red deer and dune deer, is an endangered subspecies of red deer native to the Italian Peninsula.

== Taxonomy ==
The Mesola red deer was described as a distinct taxon from the central European red deer in 2014. Its distinctiveness was based on its morphological differences from other red deer and the presence of a distinct mitochondrial haplotype not found in any other red deer population. Its holotype is an adult male skull with eight-pointed antlers collected in 2012 and donated to the Natural History Museum Vienna. Its paratype is an adult female skull collected in 2013 and donated to the same location.

The Mesola red deer is closely related to the Barbary stag and the Corsican red deer, with whom it shares distinct genetic markers. The latter two taxa descend from an ancient population of Italian red deer that otherwise survives only as the relict Mesola herd, which were imported to the Tyrrhenian islands and North Africa during antiquity, and have lower genetic diversity than that which is noticeable in subfossil remains of mainland deer. The precise relationships between the three subspecies are however partly obscured by their all having undergone significant genetic bottlenecks, therefore obscuring potential founder effects.

== Description ==
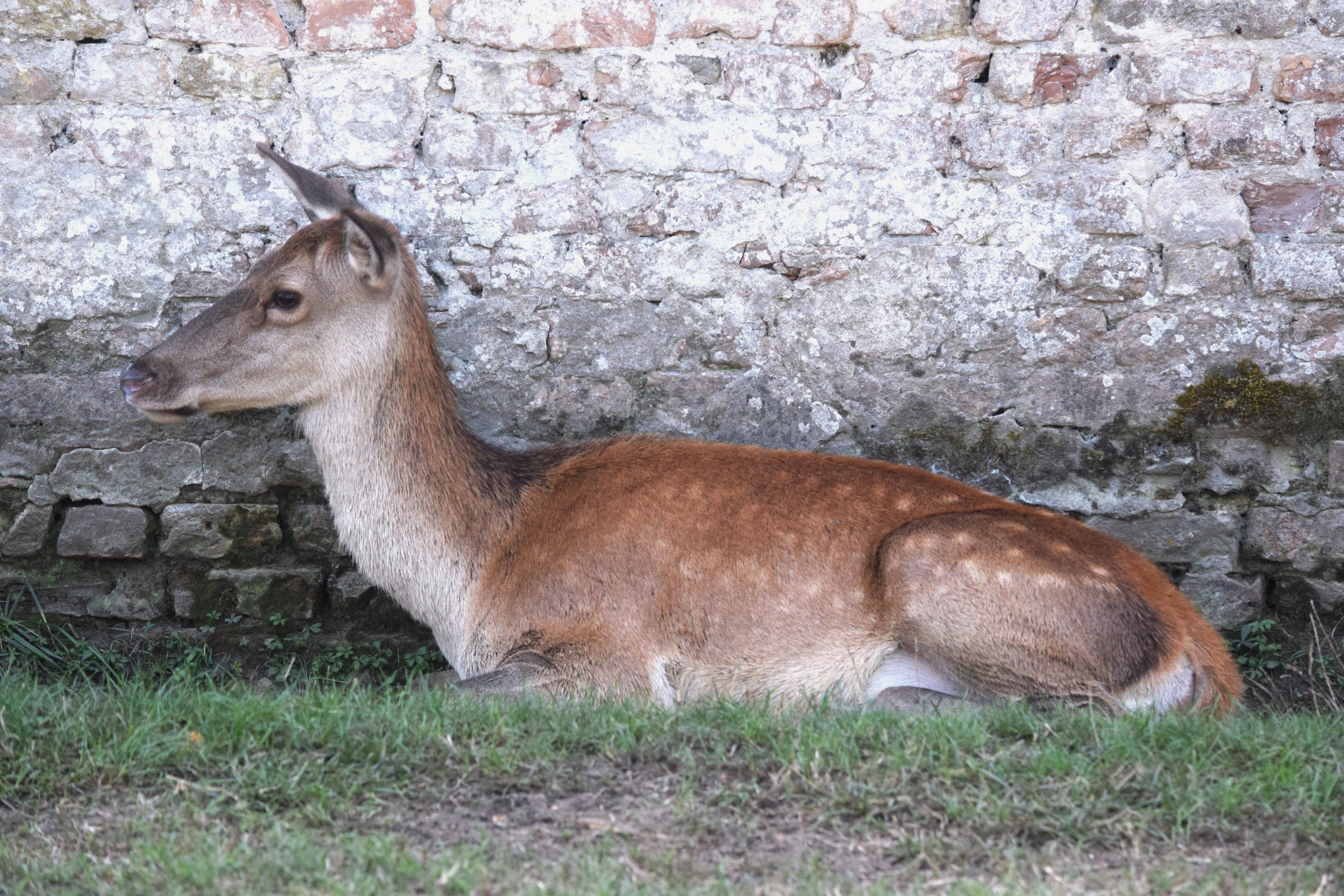
Adult female, showing spotted summer coat

Mesola red deer resemble other small Mediterranean populations of red deer, such as the Spanish red deer and the Corsican red deer. Stags average 110 kilograms (240 lb) in weight, while hinds average 75 kilograms (165 lb). Adult stags are approximately 184 centimetres (6.04 ft) long on average and 108 centimetres (3.54 ft) at the shoulder, while hinds average 167 centimetres (5.48 ft) long and 95 centimetres (3.12 ft) tall.

Mesola red deer are generally paedomorphic compared to other red deer. Antler growth is delayed and often retains a juvenile-like form. The tines are small and have fewer points than larger subspecies, most commonly six, and the bez and crown tines are commonly absent and are only observed in fully mature stags; when the crown is present, it is typically rudimentary and cup-like. The summer coat of Mesola red deer retains visible yellow spotting in all age groups, whereas this is lost in mature specimens of other populations.

== Distribution ==
The Mesola red deer is found primarily in the Bosco della Mesola Nature Reserve, a 835.70-hectare (2,065.1-acre) area in the comune of Mesola, Province of Ferrara, Emilia-Romagna. A second population was established in the Natural Regional Park of Serre in 2023.

=== Former range ===
The Italian red deer was historically widely distributed across the Italian Peninsula, but was extirpated from most of its range beginning in the Middle Ages due to deforestation and overhunting. A population survived on the coast of the Po Valley in a continuous stretch of forest extending between the Po delta and the outskirts of Ravenna, which grew on a sandy area separated from the mainland by wetlands and lagoons. The northernmost tract of this woodland was used by Duke Alfonso II d'Este of Ferrara as a hunting park for both the red deer and the fallow deer until its dismantlement in 1598. The remaining parts of the forest were cleared over the following centuries except for the Mesola wood itself, which was surrounded by swampland that rendered it difficult to access overland. During the 20th century, the last red deer in the Alps and the Apennines died off, leaving the Mesola herd as the only surviving population of the subspecies. Reestablished deer populations in Italy have since consisted of central European red deer and some hybrids of red deer with North American elk, due to both natural spread through the Alps and to the use of European stock in reintroduction programs.

== Conservation and threats ==
Over the first few decades of the 1900s, the population of Mesola deer fluctuated between 160 and 300 individuals, with approximately 25 to 40 per year being harvested in hunts. Due to further exploitation of the wood during World War II, the population dropped to a historic minimum of 10 between 1943 and 1947. The wood was acquired by the National Forestry Service in 1954, after which the deer population fluctuated but tended to rise, eventually reaching an approximate 150 specimens in 2010 and 300 by 2023. Conservation measures have included re-seeding of grazing pastures, the providing of supplementary food during the winter, and the culling of competing fallow deer. These efforts corresponded with an increase in the quality of antler growth in stags, most prominently a significant reduction in the quantity of antler-less yearlings and in the reappearance of stags with visible crowns and bez tines, which had otherwise been absent.

A second population of Italian red deer was established in the Natural Regional Park of Serre by the Italian branch of the WWF. Fifty specimens were released in various stages over the winter months of 2023, with the first two fawns in the region being born the following summer. Conservation efforts have included efforts to maintain distance between deer and agricultural areas in order to avoid the formation of negative cultural perceptions around the animals.

The primary risks to the Mesola red deer are its small population and its limited genetic diversity due to having undergone several genetic bottlenecks as its range shrunk, both of which limit its ability to cope with environmental shifts. A secondary threat is competition with fallow deer, which shares with it a significant part of its diet while being more tolerant of crowded conditions.
