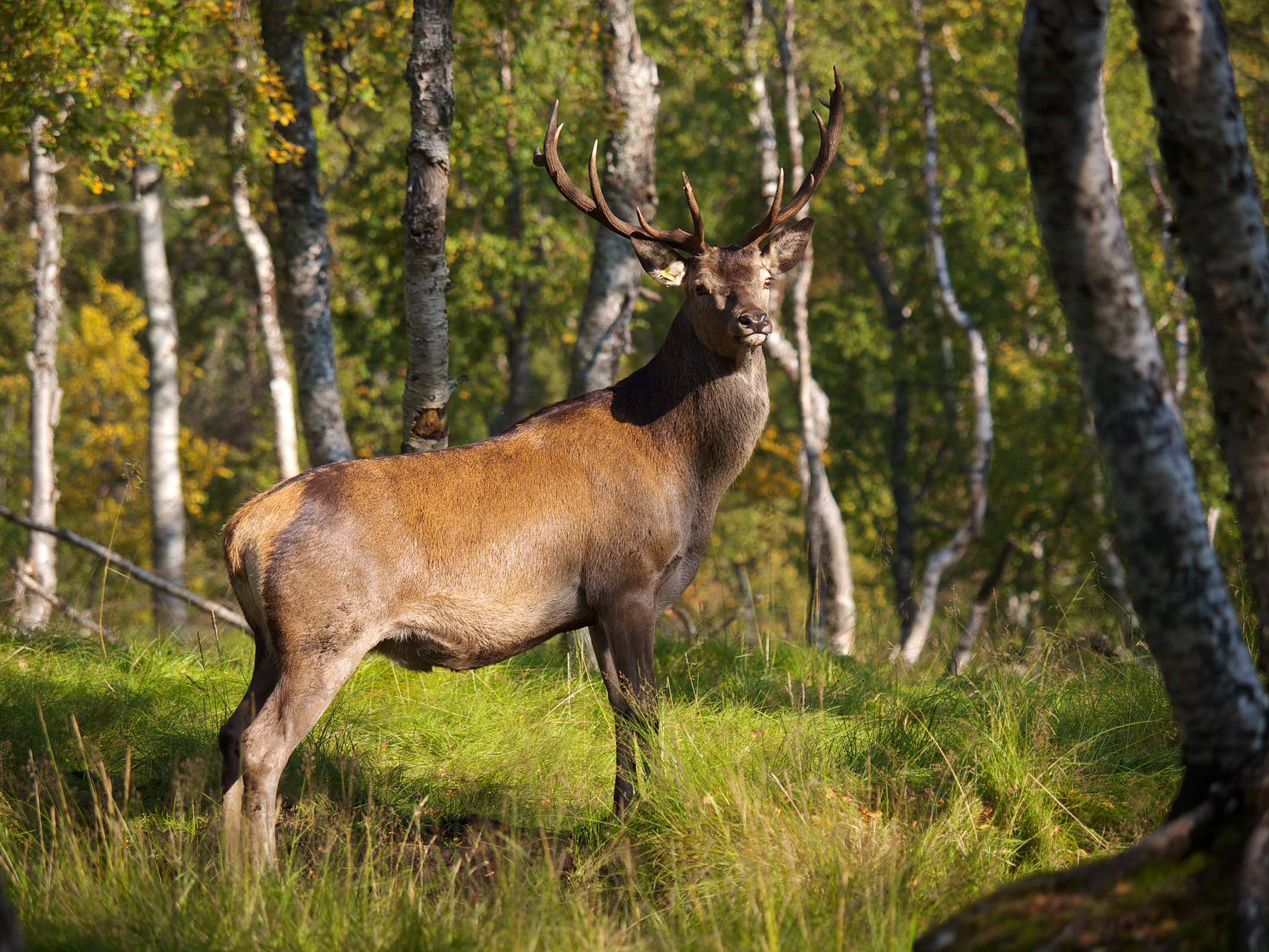

Scientific classification
- Kingdom: Animalia
- Phylum: Chordata
- Class: Mammalia
- Order: Artiodactyla
- Family: Cervidae
- Genus: Cervus
- Species: C. elaphus
- Subspecies: C. e. atlanticus

Trinomial name
- Cervus elaphus atlanticus Lönnberg, 1906

= Norwegian red deer =

Subspecies of deer

The Norwegian red deer (Cervus elaphus atlanticus) is a small subspecies of red deer native to Norway.

Shoulder height is 120–135 centimeters for the male and 105–120 centimeters for the female. Total length 190–220 centimeters for the male and 165–190 centimeters for the female. Total weight is 240–260 kilos for the male and 150–170 kilos for the female.

It is more closely related to the British deer, Cervus elaphus scoticus, than to the Swedish Cervus elaphus elaphus and the continental deer Cervus elaphus germanicus.

The red deer population in Norway has increased the last 60 years. The red deer used to wildly roam Norway's forest and hills, but since 1980, it has been farmed on a commercial basis since the 1980s. The meat of this deer is high quality.
