= Deer of Great Britain =

Six species of deer are living wild in Great Britain: Scottish red deer, roe deer, fallow deer, sika deer, Reeves's muntjac, and Chinese water deer. Of those, Scottish red and roe deer are native and have lived in the isles throughout the Holocene. Fallow deer have been reintroduced twice, by the Romans and the Normans, after dying out in the last ice age. The other three are escaped or released alien species. Moose were also formerly native to Britain, before dying out during the mid-Holocene, over 5,000 years ago. The comparably sized Irish elk, which had the largest antlers of any deer, was formerly also native to Britain, until becoming regionally extinct some 12,000 years ago. The eastern roe deer (Capreolus pygargus), also known as the Siberian roe deer, was also introduced to Britain, but has since been extirpated.

== Native ==
- Scottish red deer (subspecies)
- Roe deer

== Introduced ==
- Fallow deer (was previously native to Britain during the Pleistocene)
- Sika deer
- Reeves's muntjac
- Water deer

== Reintroduced ==
- Elk/moose - reintroduction in Scotland failed due to lack of planning (will likely be reattempted in the future), a reintroduction is planned for England.
- Reindeer – free-roaming domestic herd

== Extinct – native ==
- Irish elk (globally extinct)
- Elk (moose - locally extinct)
- Reindeer (locally extinct)

== Extinct – introduced ==
- Eastern roe deer

== Gallery ==
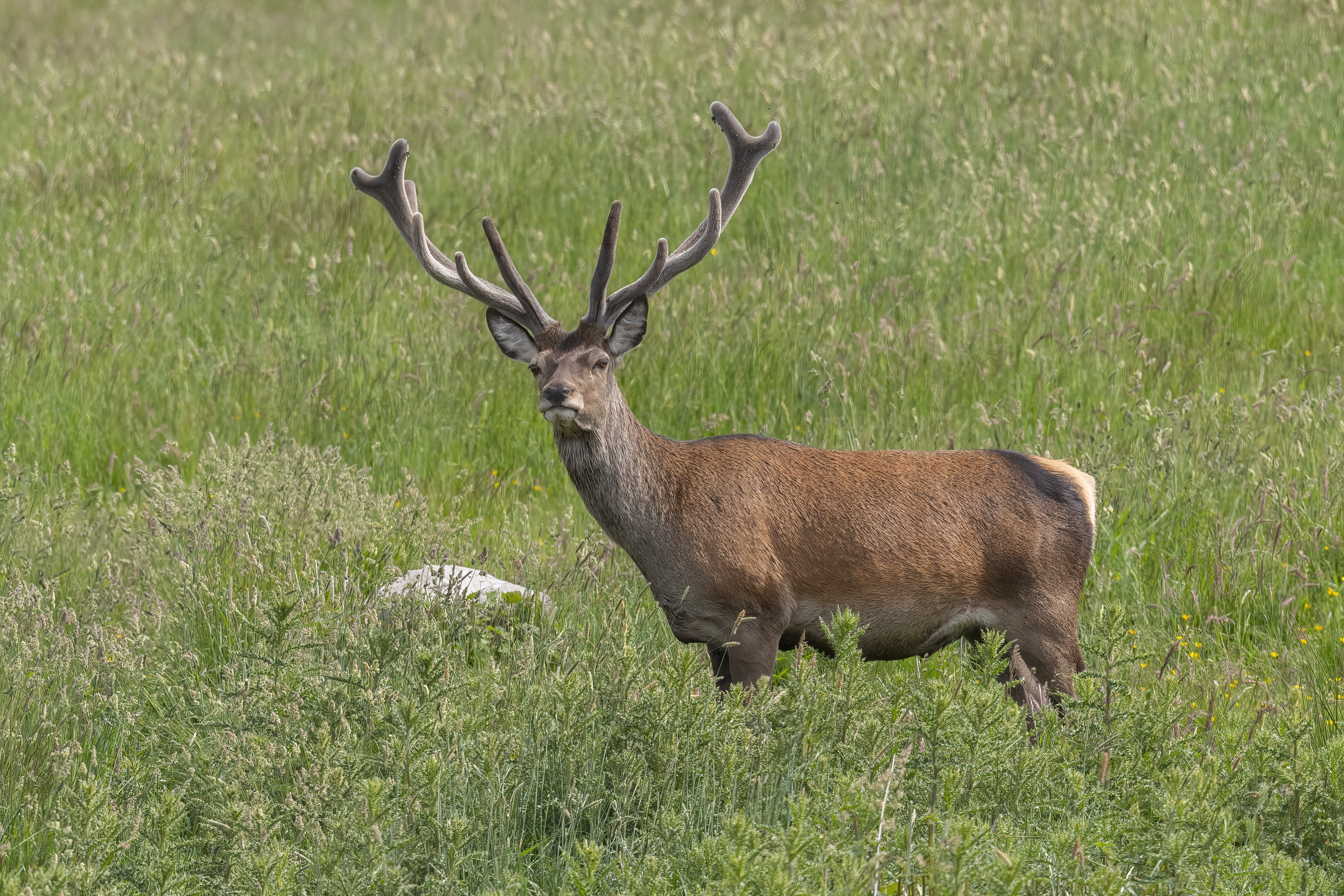
Scottish red deer (subspecies)

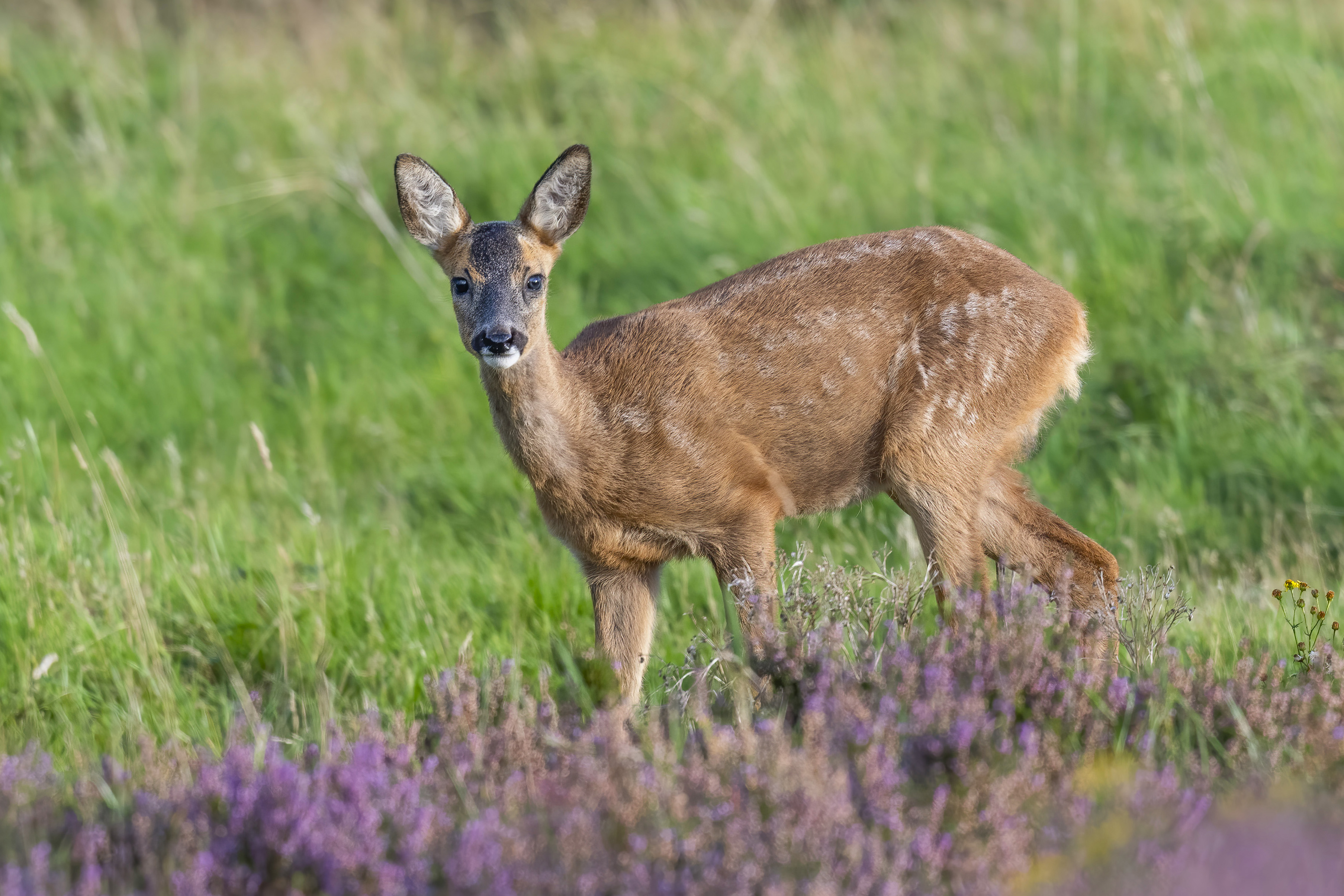
Roe deer

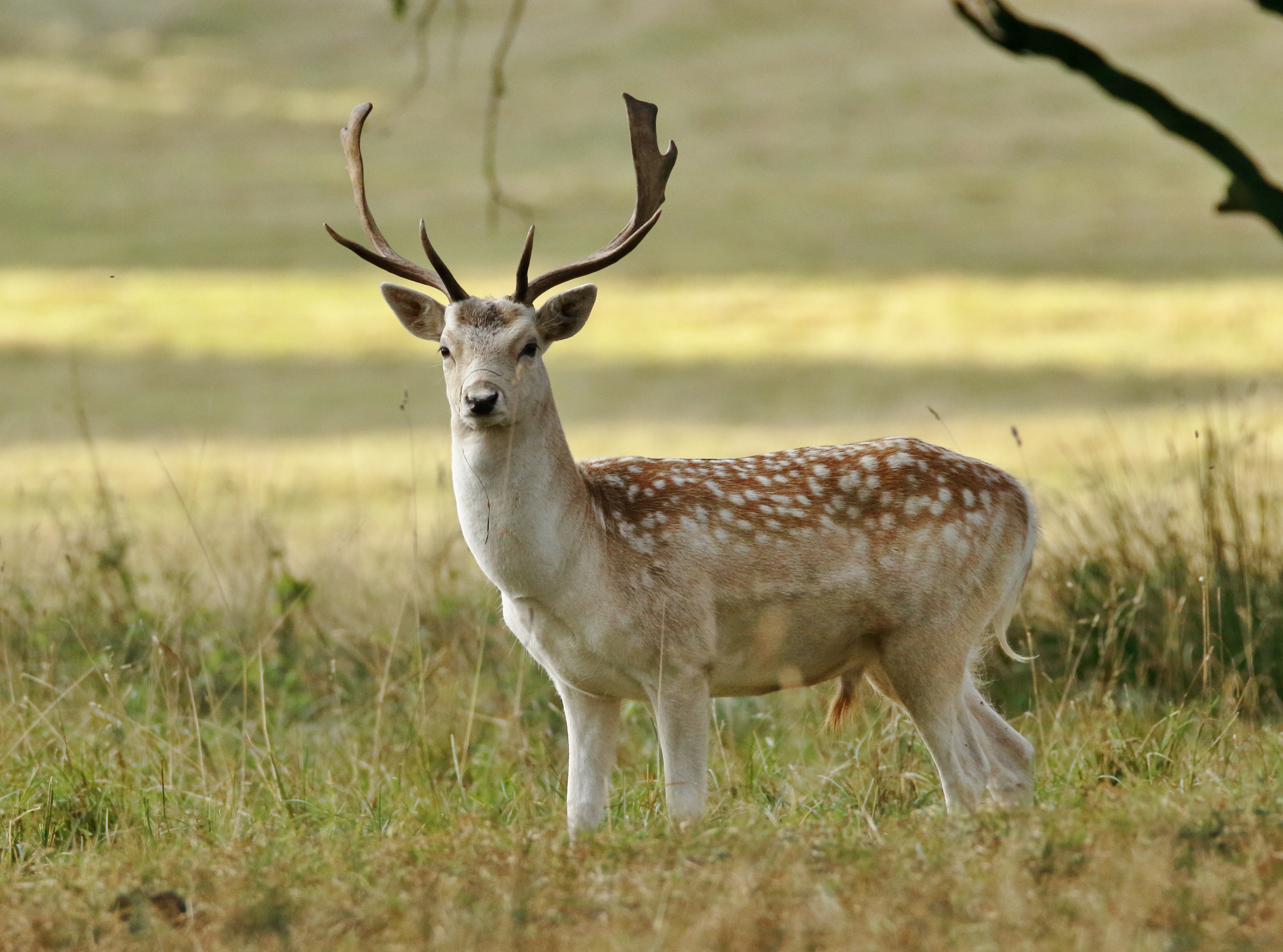
Fallow deer

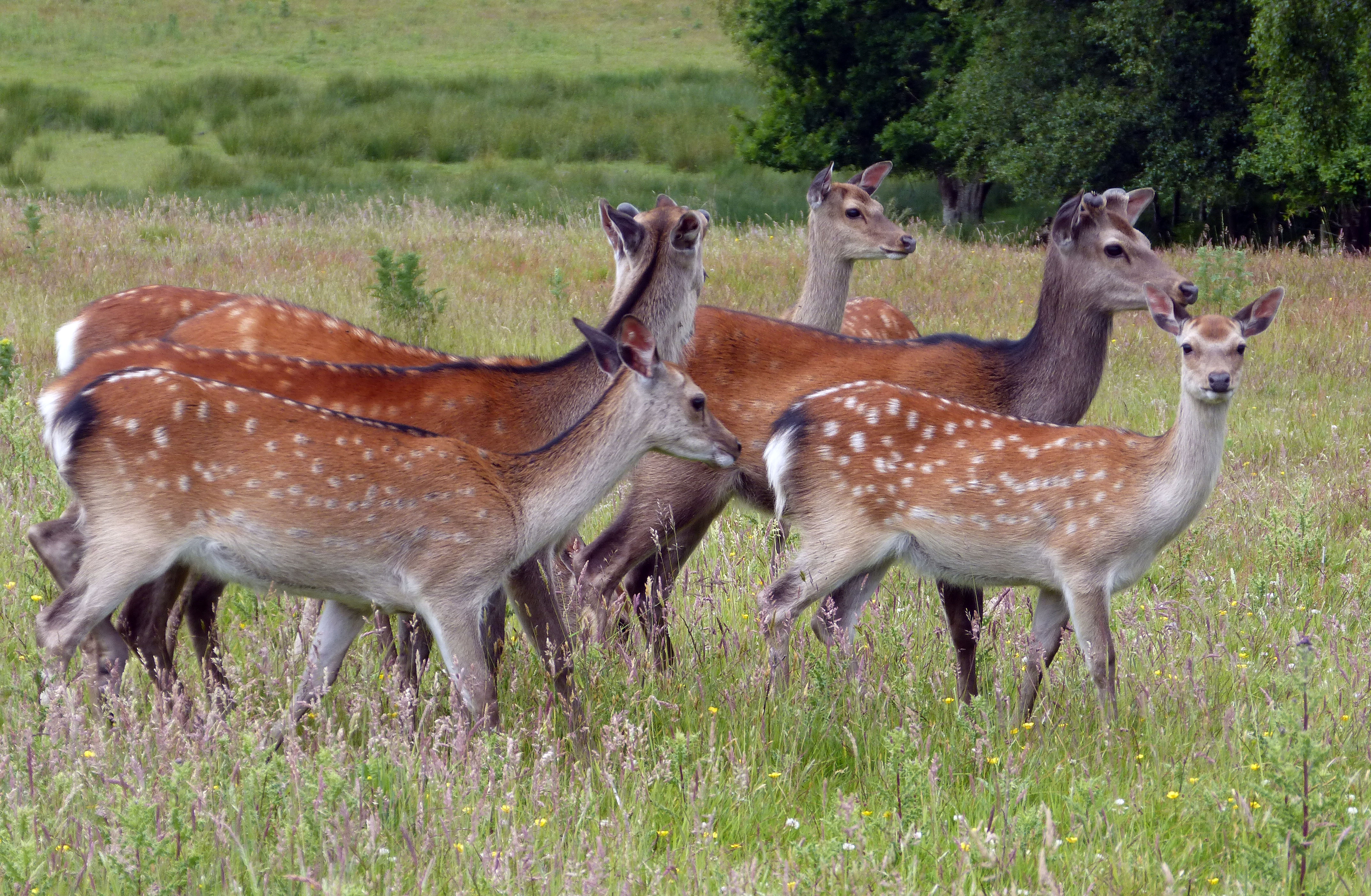
Sika deer

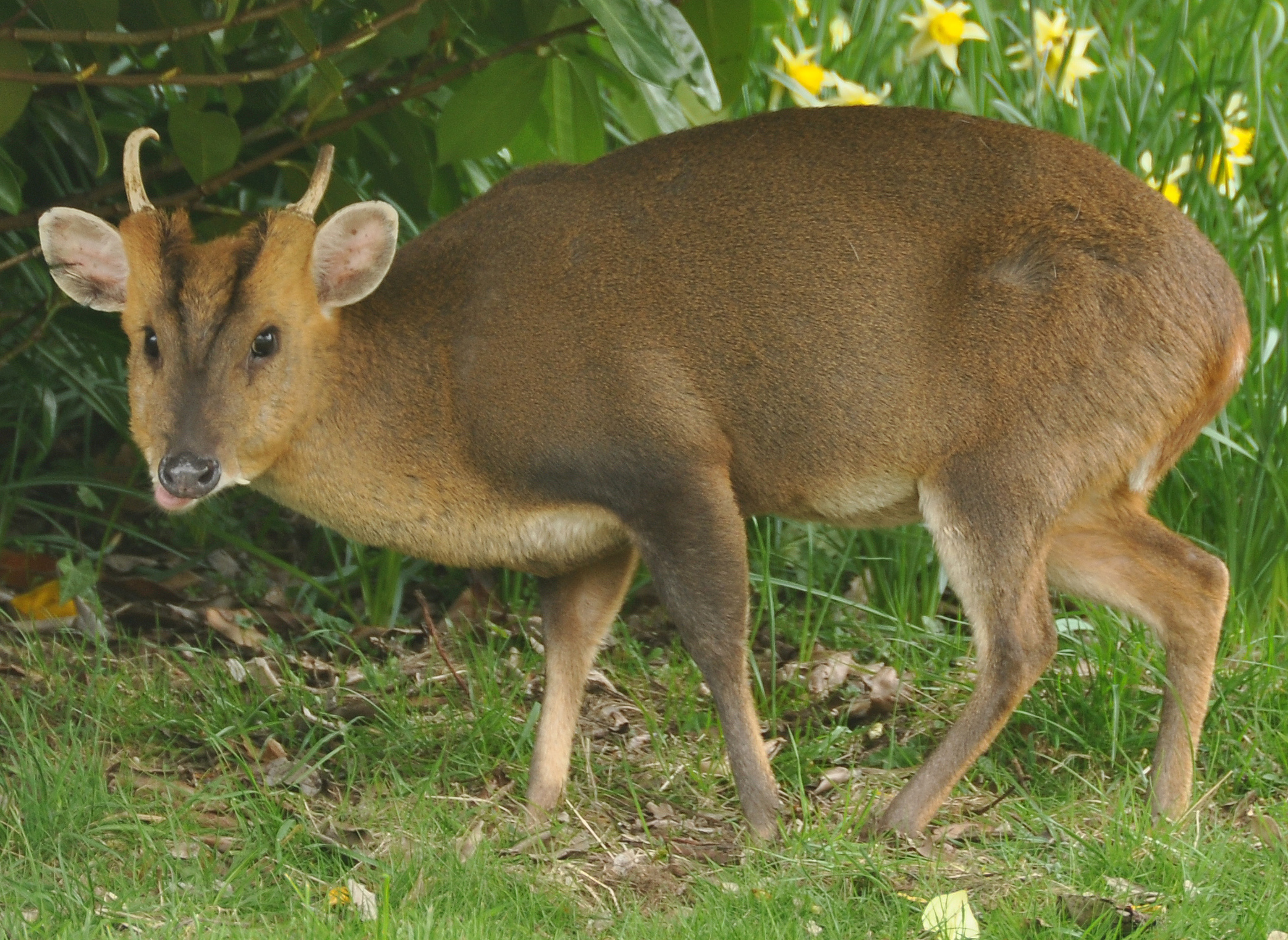
Reeves's muntjac

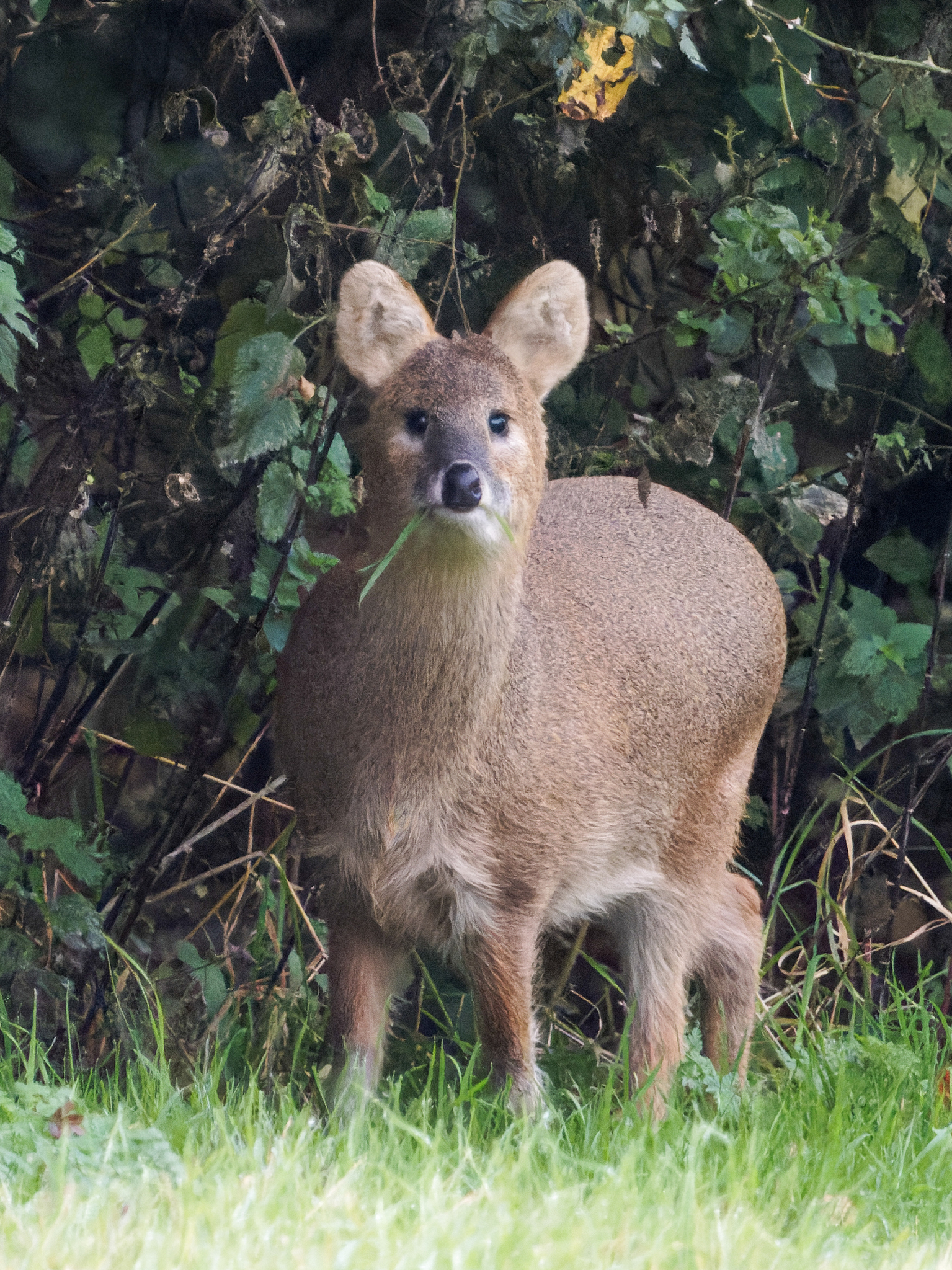
Chinese water deer (subspecies)

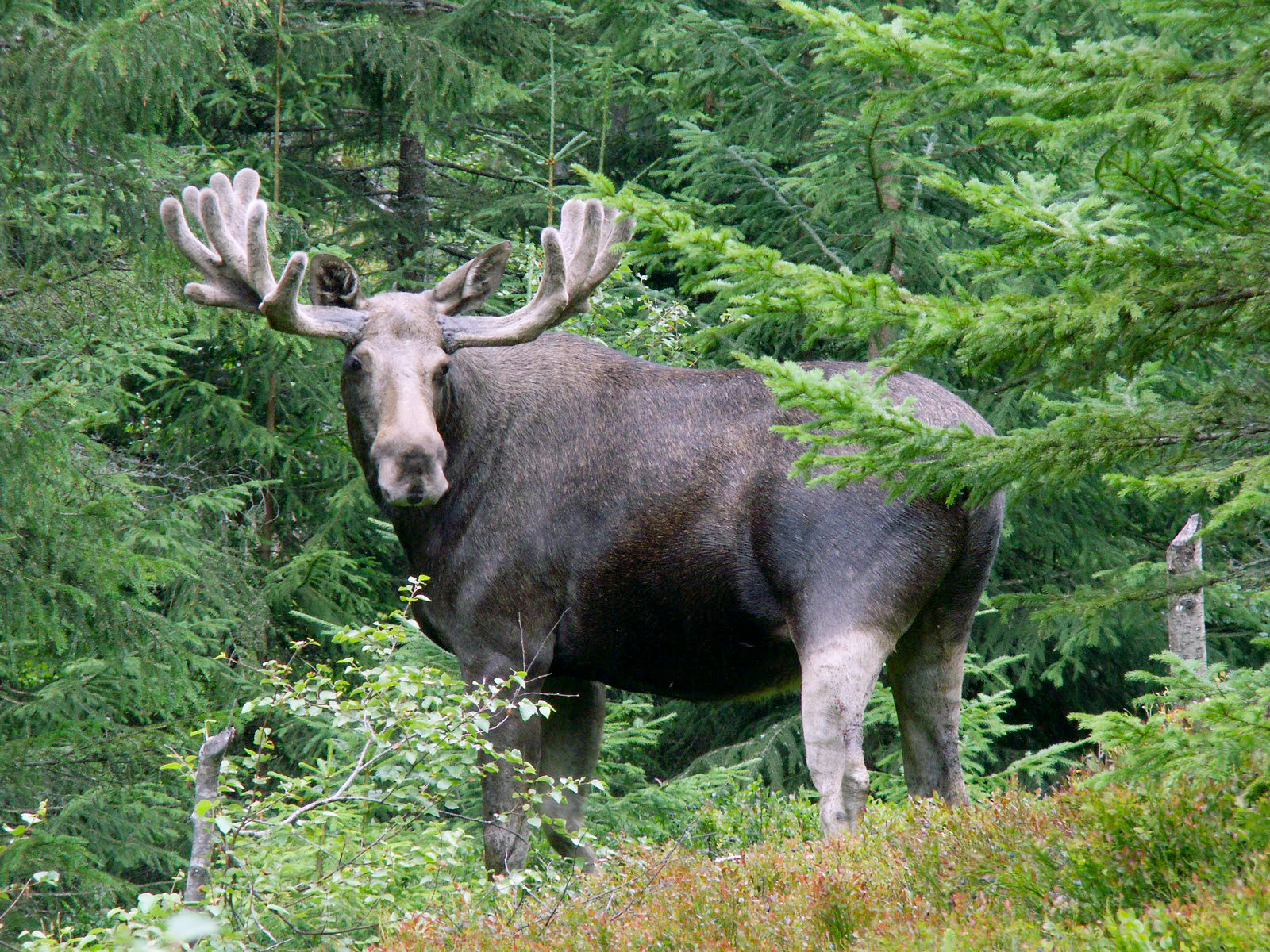
European elk (known as moose in America) – extirpated)

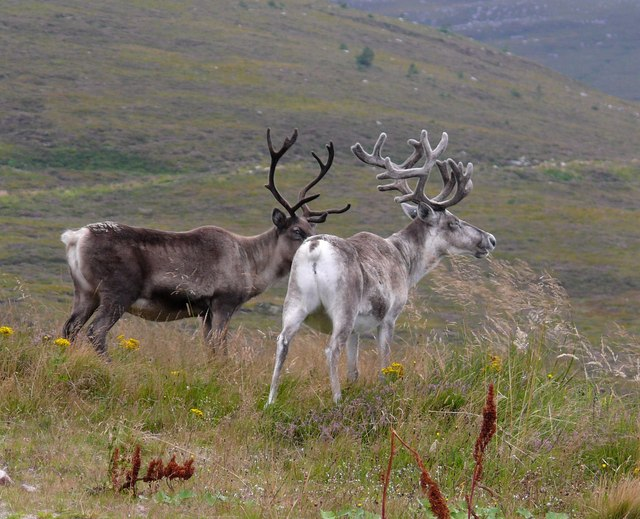
Reindeer (extirpated, free-roaming herd)

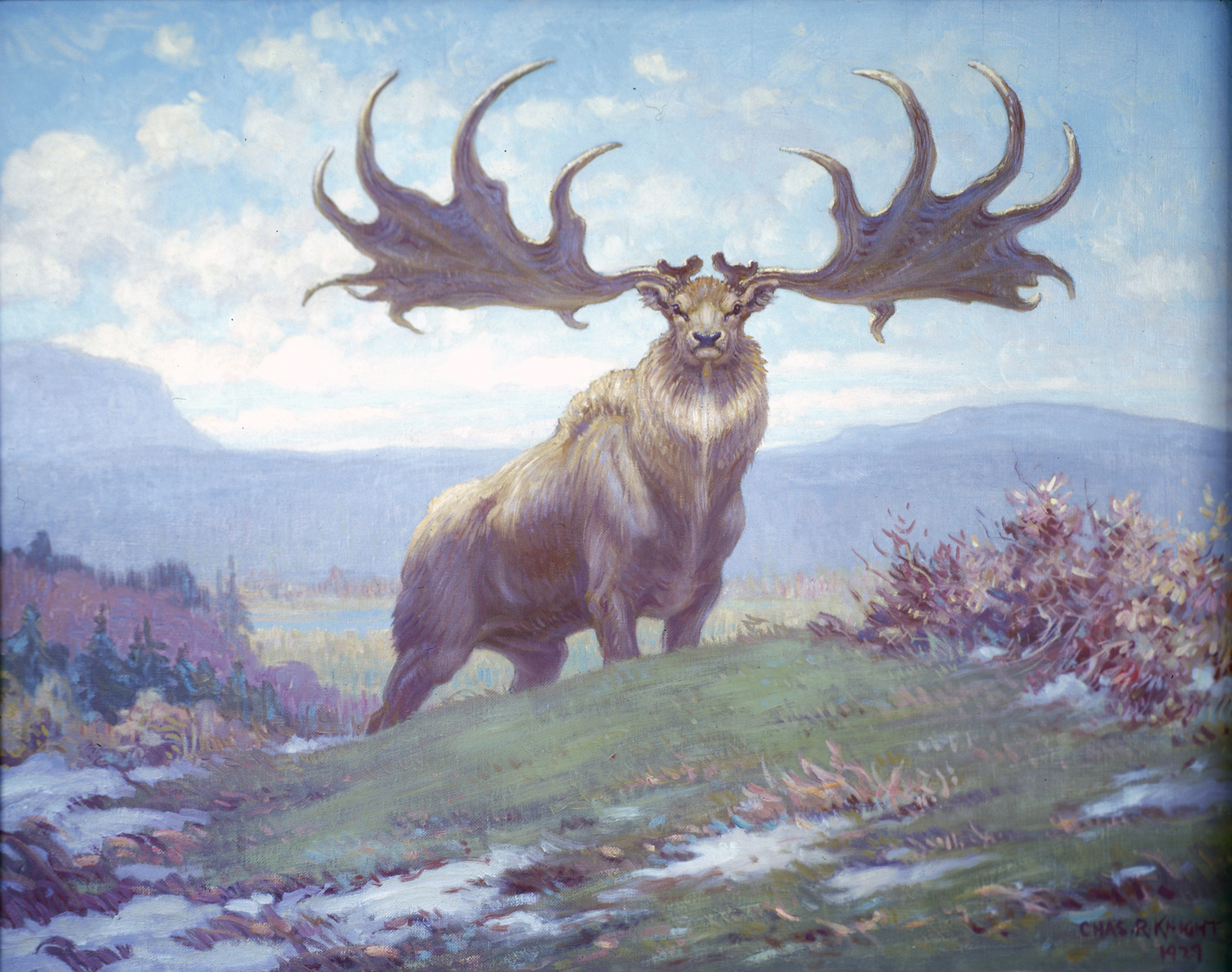
Irish elk (extinct)

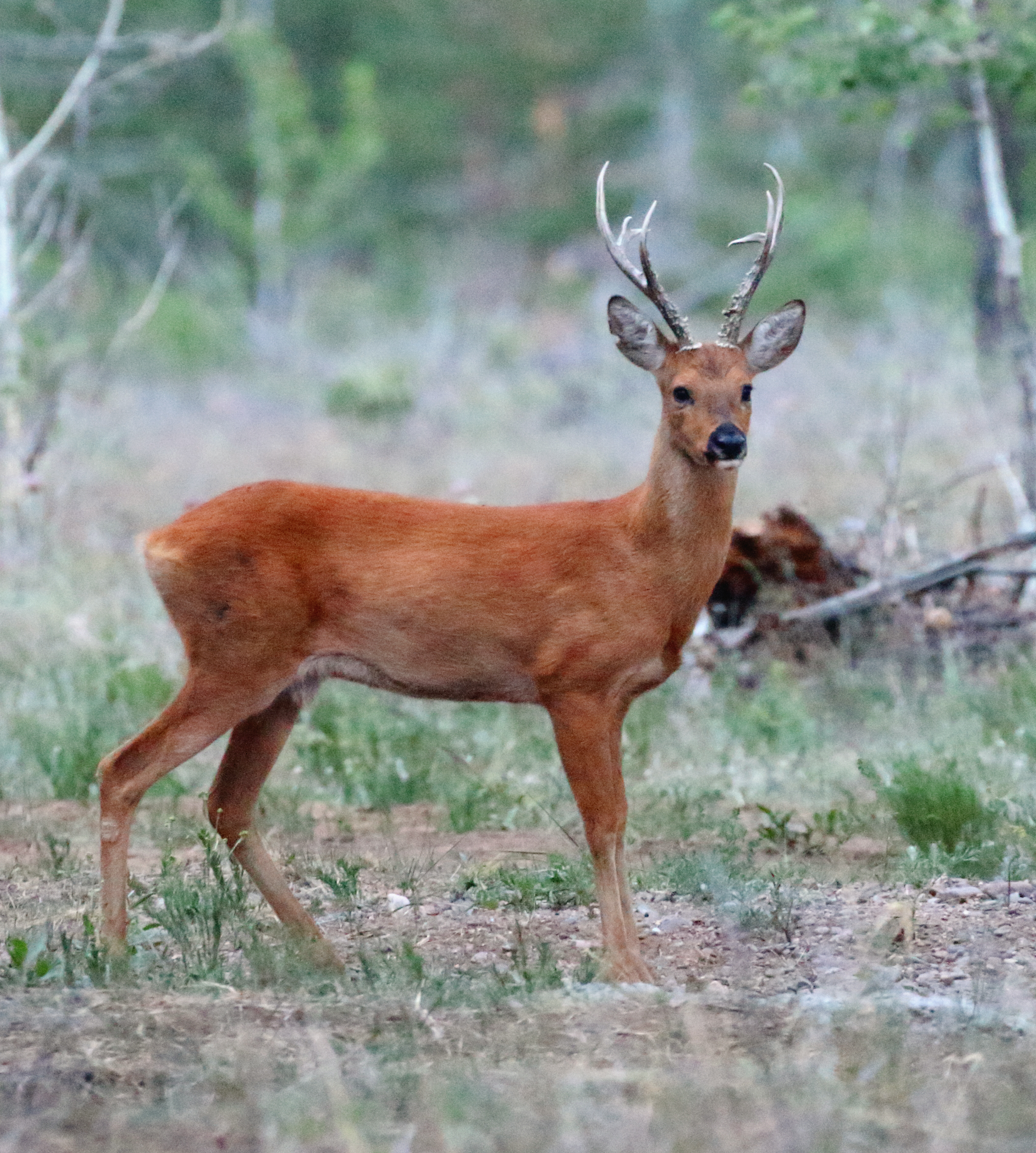
Eastern roe deer (Siberian roe deer - extirpated)
