= Horn furniture =

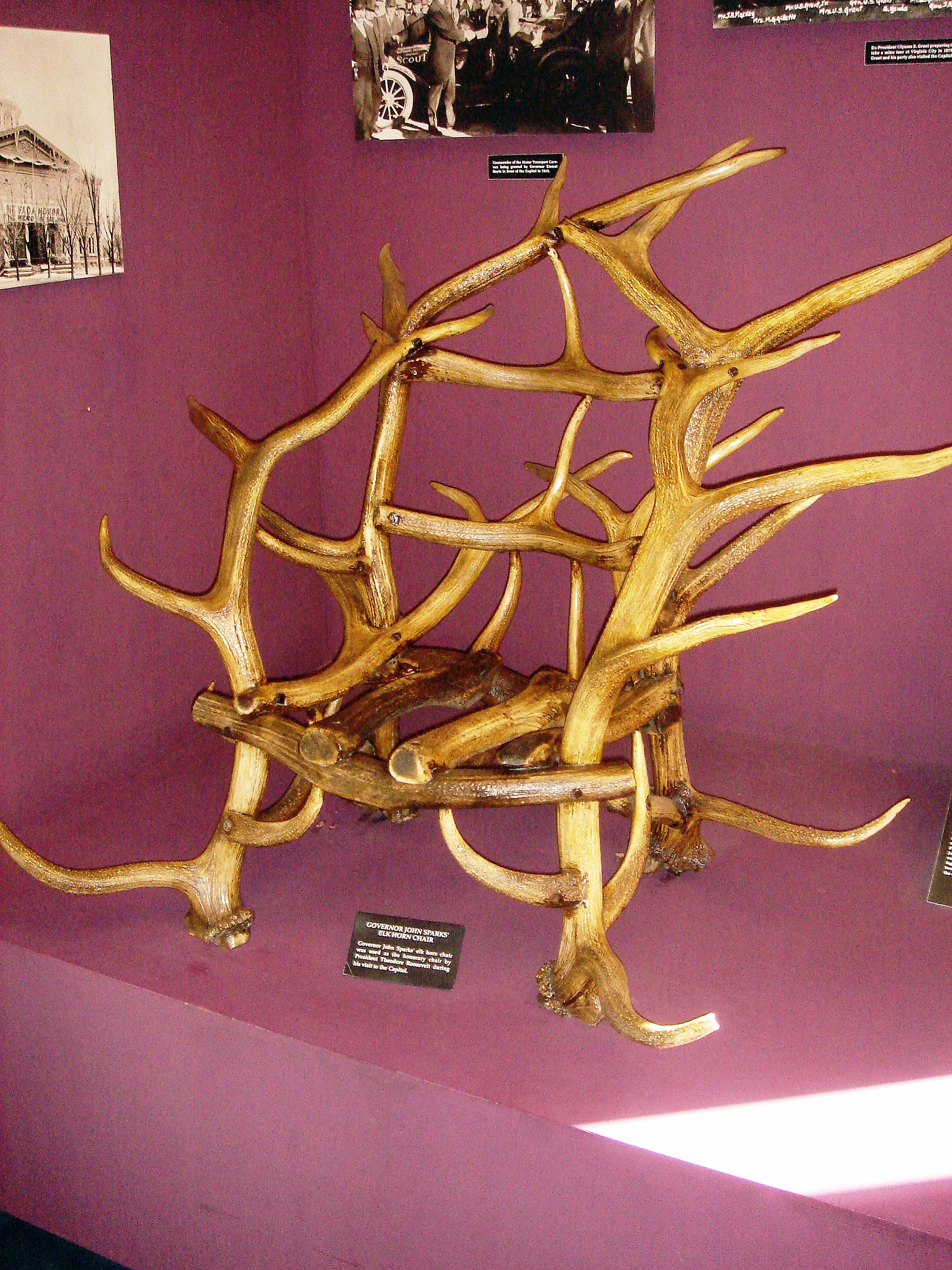
An elk horn chair in the Nevada State Capitol

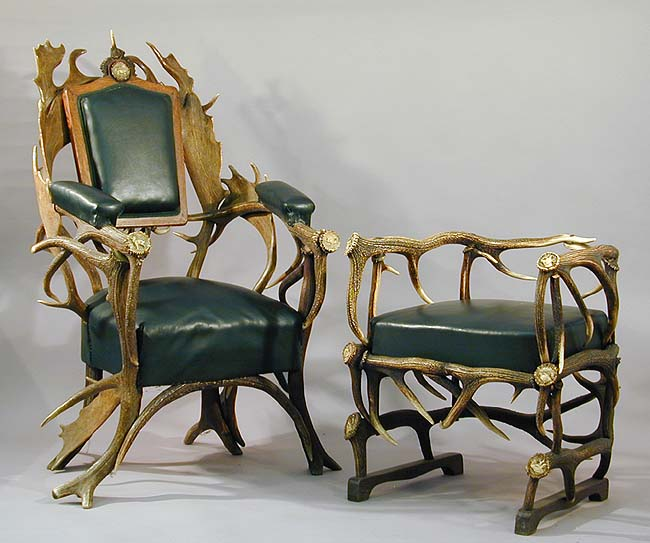
Geweihsessel

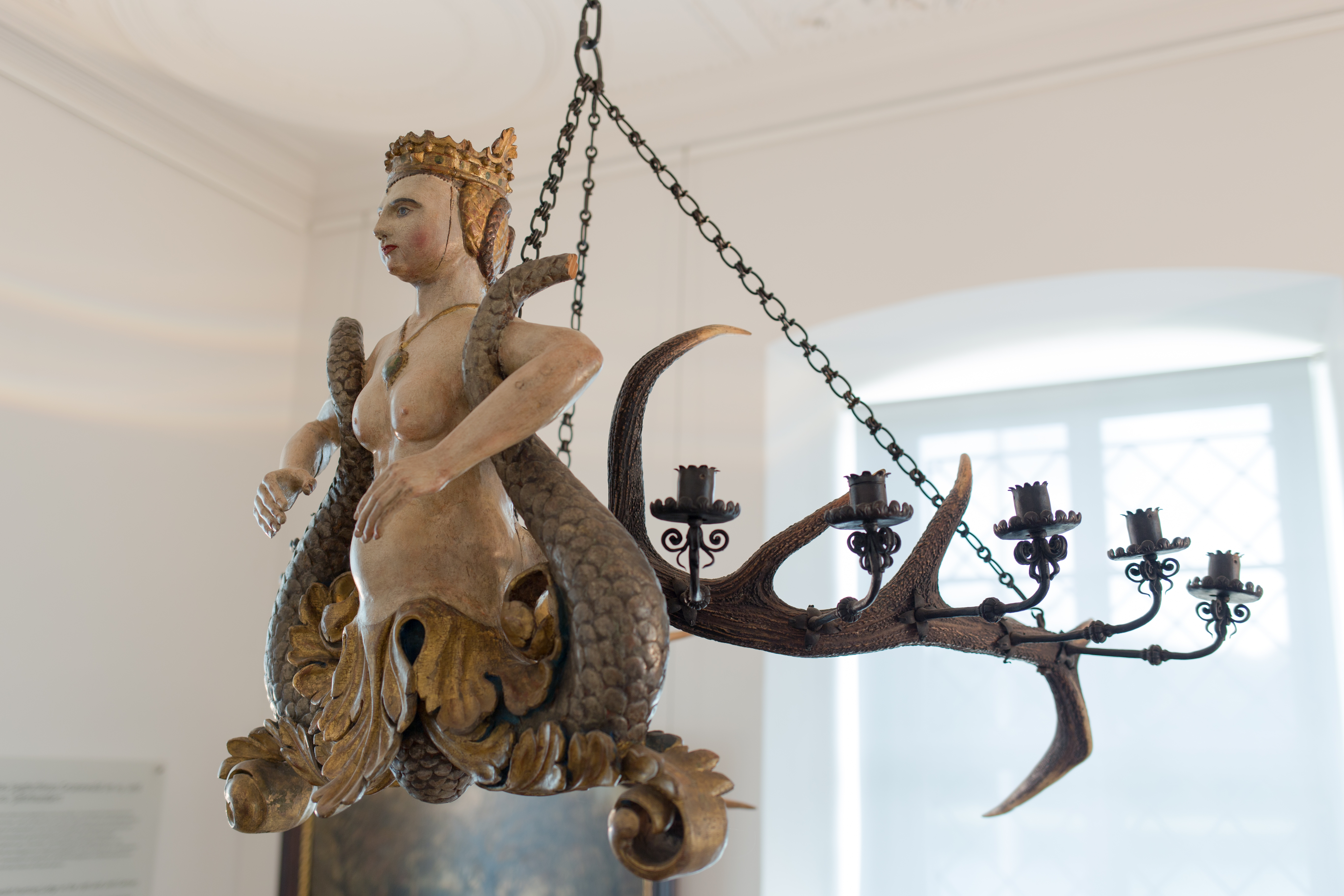
Leuchterweibchen (Female candle) at the Jagdschloss Grunewald

Horn furniture is a name given to furniture which is manufactured completely by shed antlers or pieces of furniture such as e.g. cabinets which are appliqued with antler elements such as carved horn roses or with antler pieces from tusks, fallow deer, stag and deer. Trophies of chase have already been used during the late Middle Age for furnishing and in modern times furniture makers use the horns and antlers of animals such as cattle (usually longhorned ones), antelope, moose and elk.

== History ==
Antlers were already used in the late 15th century as a source material for clothes hooks, storage racks and chandeliers, the so-called "lusterweibchen". Furniture made by antlers have been invented in the 19th century and can therefore be assigned to the Biedermeier period. They were exclusively made for the European nobility to decorate their hunting castles and various manors. Historically mentioned horn furniture was developed in the year 1825 for a hunting castle of the count William of Nassau near Wiesbaden, Germany, A photograph of 1890 is the single existing evidence as the castles was destroyed in World War II and the interior furniture is regarded as lost. Further known collections of historic horn furniture are credited with the hunting room in the country estate of the Brandhof of the Archduke Johann of Austria or the antler collection of count Arco in Munich, Germany. Many other examples of horn furniture of that time can only be found with drawings and pictures, e.g. Joseph Danhauser (1780–1829) an Austrian furniture manufacturer left hundreds of drawing and another well-known aquarelle is the dressing room of Ferdinand Baron von Hildprandt.

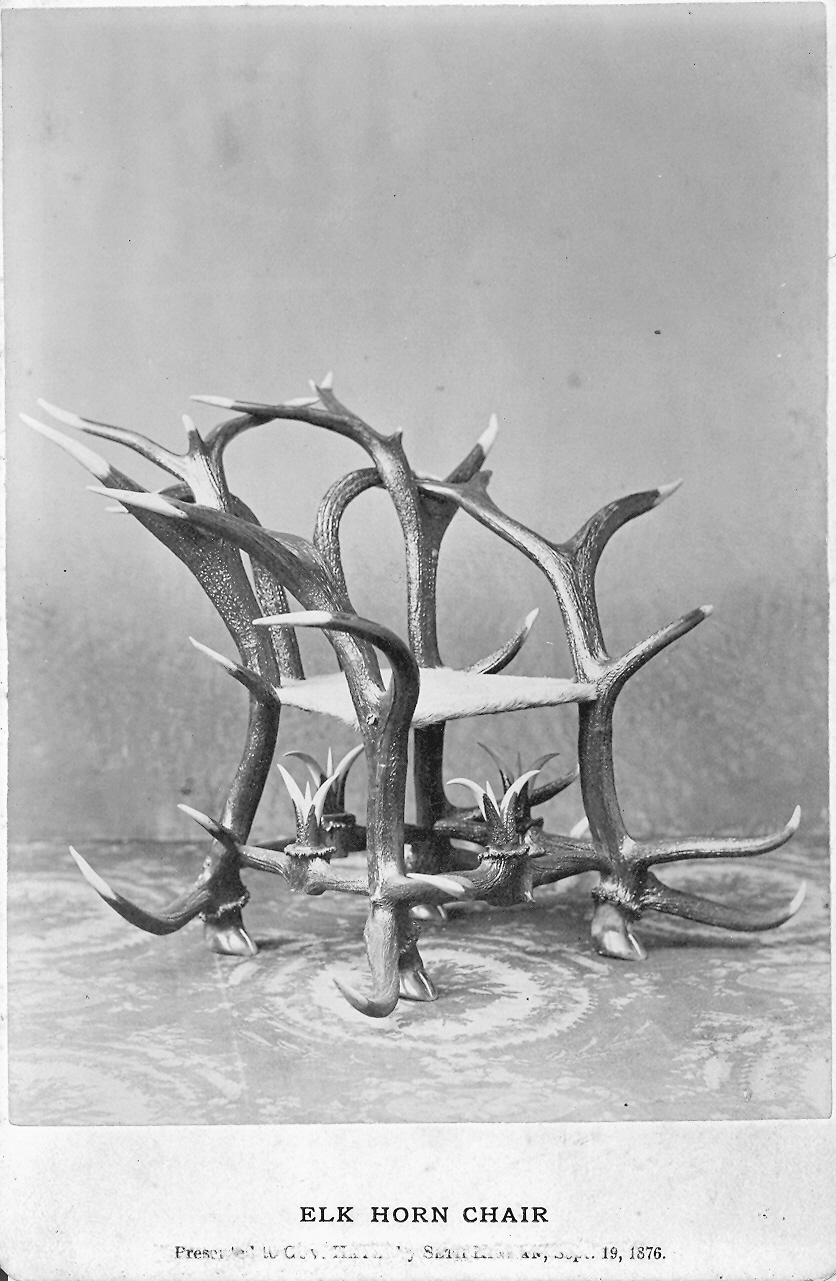
Elkhorn chair presented to Rutherford B. Hayes by Seth Kinman in 1876

The ambitious European middle-class people embodied a lifestyle trend of the cultivation of home décor during the second half of the 19th century. With the increasing popularity of the World Exhibitions furniture styling trends became more and more accessible. The London World Exhibition in 1851 presented antler furniture as one of its great novelties. The Hamburg sculptor and ivory carver H.F.C.Rampendahl exhibited horn furniture pieces such as bureaus, chairs and sofa. Many other artists followed and the manufacturing of horn furniture finalized in a serial production via catalogue sales.

Popular horn furniture was related to the following well-known designers and or company names in Germany and Austria such as Gustav Lorenz, Heinrich Keitel, Kurt Schicker, Rudolf Brix, Vitus Madel & Sohn. In the United States the most famous designer was Friedrich Wenzel. Their portfolio covered the complete market of furnishings and additionally a lot of houseware.

The horn furniture trend suddenly ended at the end of the 1920s and the production was ceased completely. During the post-war period in Europe only individual orders could be recognized by antique furnishing experts.

The lodge style and cabin décor trend in modern households today is facing a reinvigorated demand for horn furniture. Home décor magazines show modern reproductions of seating horn furniture, lamps, candle stick and other small furniture.
