= Grunewaldsee =

Lake in Charlottenburg-Wilmersdorf, Berlin, Germany

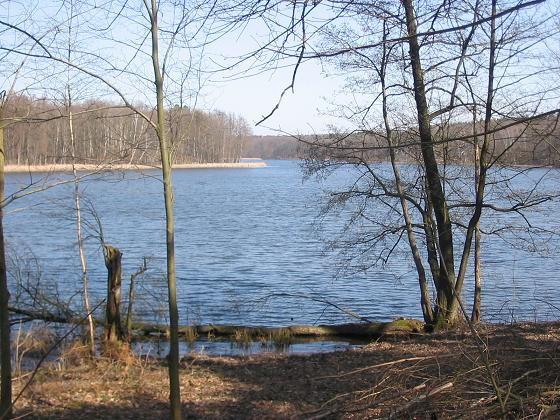

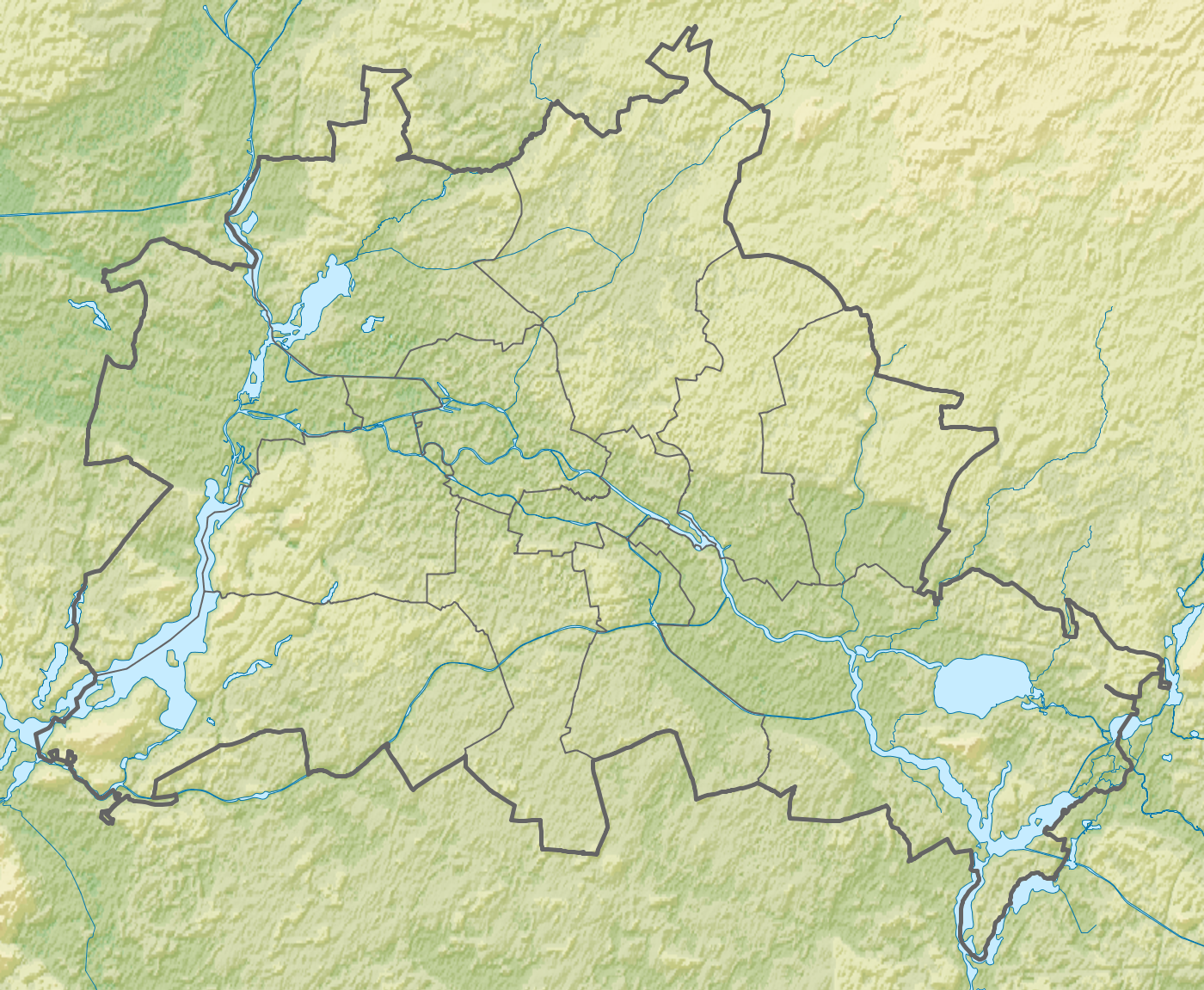
- Location within Berlin
- Location: Berlin, Germany
- Coordinates: 52°28′12″N 13°15′36″E

The Grunewaldsee (German: [ˈɡʁuːnəvaltˌzeː]) is a lake located in western Bezirk Charlottenburg-Wilmersdorf in Berlin within the Grunewald forest. It has a surface of c. 175,000 m^{2}. The Jagdschloss Grunewald hunting lodge is located on the south bank of the lake.

Bathing has been officially prohibited for humans since 2004.

== See also ==
- List of lakes of Germany
