= Lusterweibchen =

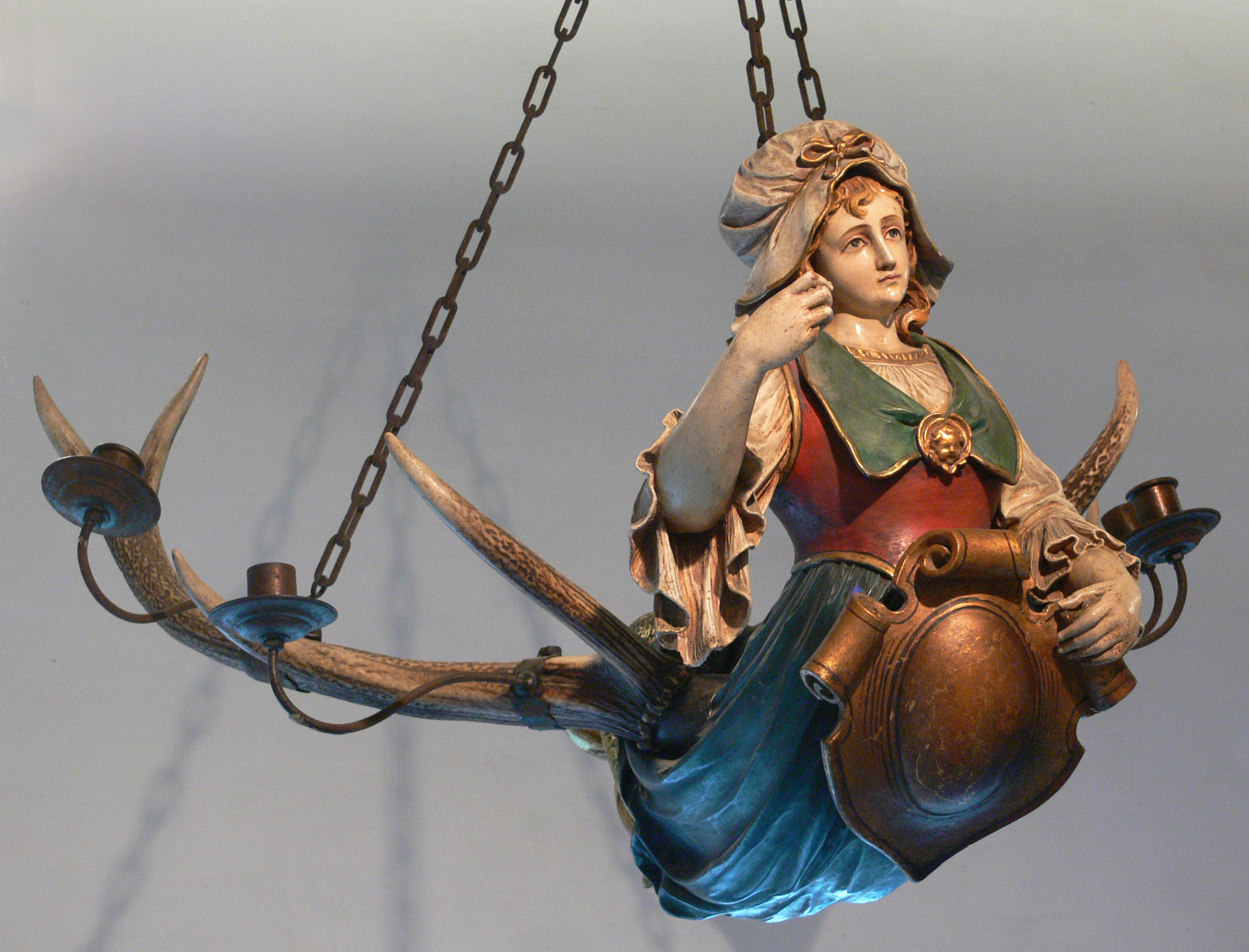
19th-century Lusterweibchen

Lusterweibchen is a style of chandelier. Having a horizontal antler fixed with a carved wooden sculpture, the German term “Lüsterweibchen” (little woman chandelier) refers to the sculpture, while the lamp itself is categorised as a type of horn furniture.

== History ==
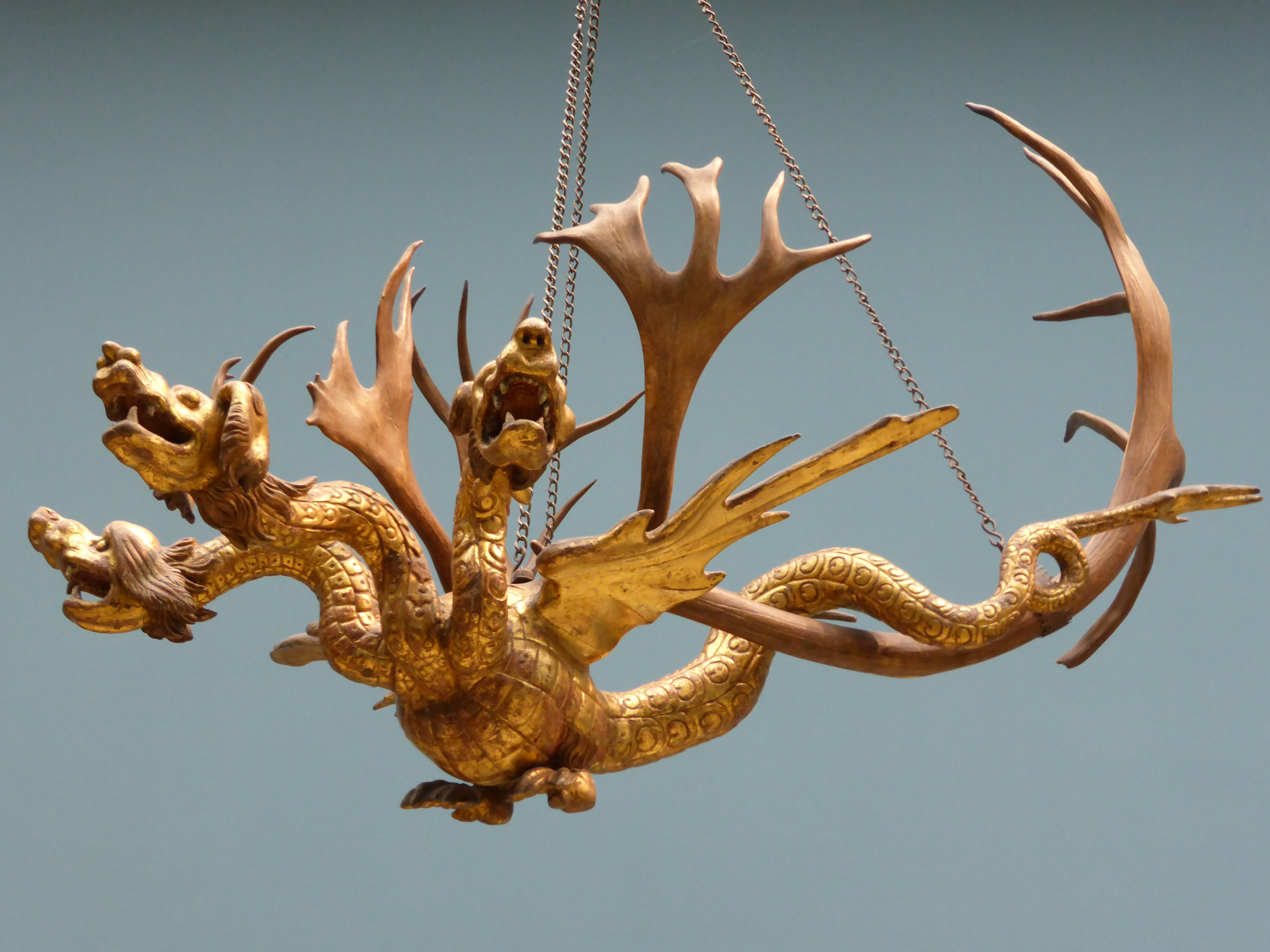
Dragon chandelier using reindeer antlers, sculpted by Veit Stoss following a design by Albrecht Dürer - in the German National Museum in Nürnberg

The first chandeliers in the lusterweibchen style appeared at the end of the 14th century. The Marienkirche in Lemgo, Germany, was illuminated by a chandelier that combined a bust of a woman with a pair of 12-point deer antlers. The artist of this particular piece is unknown, but the extraordinary chandelier inspired many other artists to create their own works.

During the 16th century lusterweibchen chandeliers boomed, with famous designs by artists such as Albrecht Dürer, Veit Stoss, and Tilman Riemenschneider. They may have had an almost magical appeal, reflecting the spirit of the era. The most famous lusterweibchen design was a dragon chandelier carved by Veit Stoss according to a drawing by Albrecht Dürer.

As an element of horn furniture, antlers are treasured by collectors and well suited for display. The combination of antler and a carved statue resulted in a perfect unit for decoration and room illumination. With the rising prosperity of the European middle class at the end of the 19th century, lusterweibchen chandeliers became an established design feature. Artists created various designs ranging from copies of old drawings to busts of contemporary noblewomen, mermaids, Dianas, coats of arms, guild emblems, and lustermaennchen featuring male figures.
