= Jagdschloss Grunewald =

Hunting lodge and art museum

Coordinates: 52°28′2″N 13°15′41″E

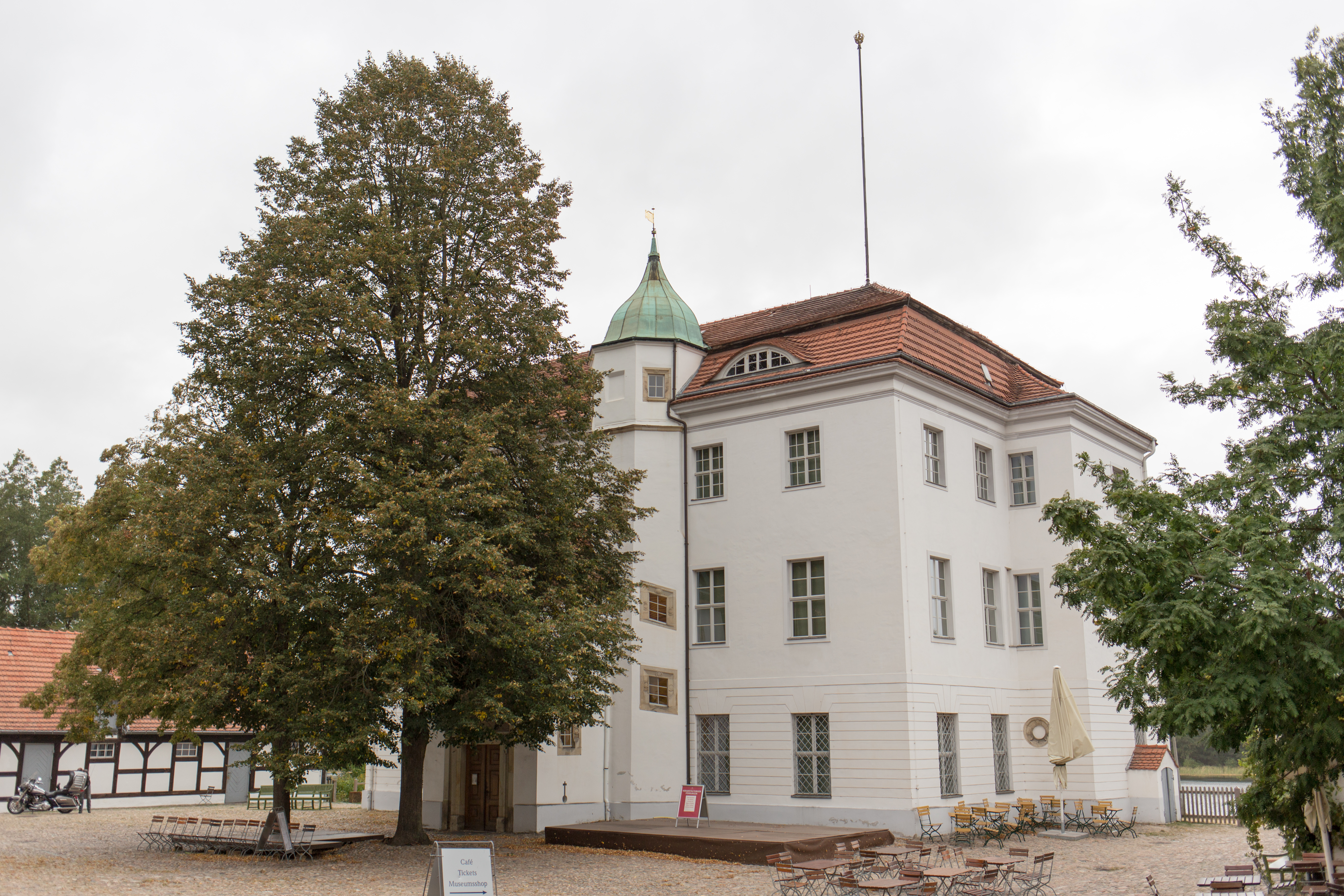
Jagdschloss Grunewald

Jagdschloss Grunewald

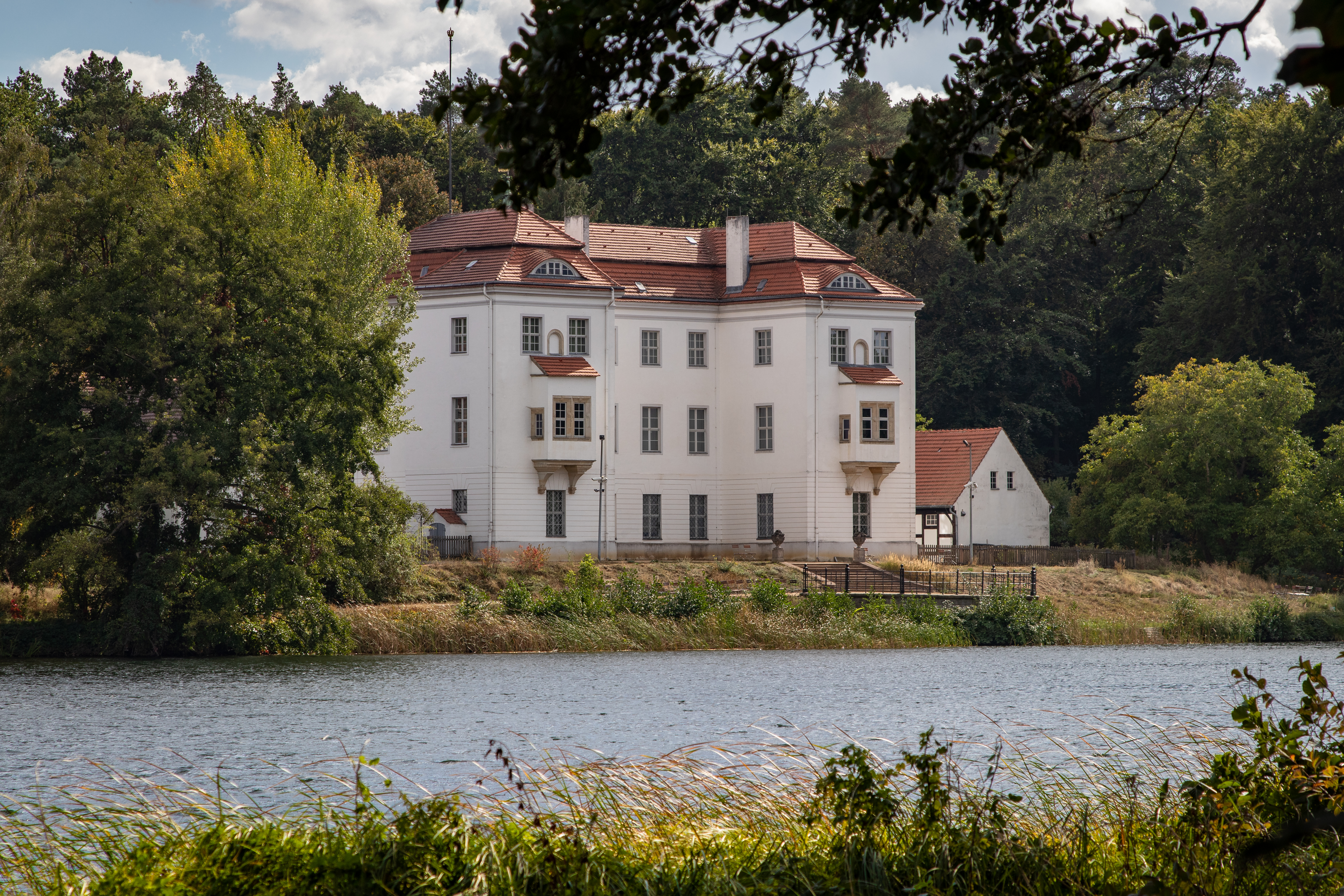
Jagdschloss Grunewald from the lake side

The Jagdschloss Grunewald, a hunting lodge, is the oldest preserved castle of Berlin, Germany. It is on the south waterfront of the Grunewaldsee and is part of the locality Dahlem in the borough Steglitz-Zehlendorf.

The Jagdschloss was built in 1542/1543. Its owner was Joachim II Hector the prince-elector of the Margraviate of Brandenburg. The building was created in the Renaissance style and got the name Zum grünen Wald, "to the green forest", and gave the whole Grunewald its name. Around 1800 the château got the name Grunewald too. During reconstructions between 1705 and 1708 by Frederick I, the first king of Prussia, it received its Baroque design from master builder Martin Grünberg.

The Jagdschloss has been administered by the Prussian Palaces and Gardens Foundation Berlin-Brandenburg since 1932 and is used as a museum. It contains paintings by Lucas Cranach the Elder, his son Lucas Cranach the Younger, and from the Netherlands and Germany from 15th to 19th century. The Jagdschloss contains the sole remaining hall in Berlin from the time of the Renaissance. In 1977, a hunting-kit collection was established in a nearby building.

== The building of Jagdschlössern under Kurfürst Joachim II. Hector ==
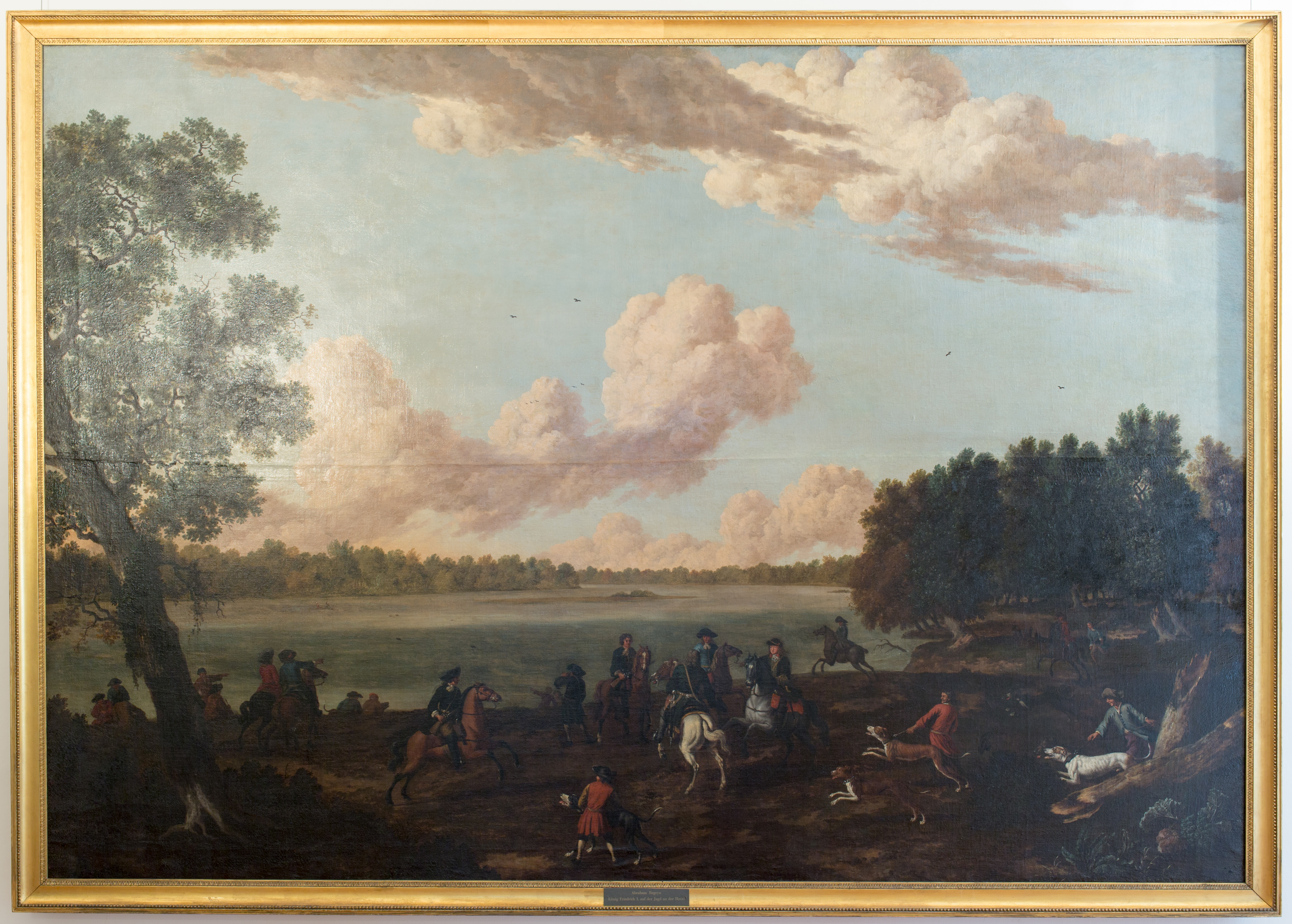
Abraham Begeyn: King Frederick I on the Hunt

At the beginning of the 16th century Elector Joachim II Hector began building hunting lodges in the Margraviate of Brandenburg in the wooded and wild area around Alt-Berlin and Cölln. In addition to existing simple hunting lodges, mostly timber framed, hunting lodges were built in Bötzow (later Oranienburg), in the Teltower Heide with Grunewald and in Köpenick, Renaissance hunting lodges were built in the Renaissance style, as well as castle complexes converted for this purpose in Potsdam and Grimnitz near Joachimsthal on the edge of the Schorfheide. Of these castles from the time of Joachim II, only the Grunewald hunting lodge has survived.

It was about 15 kilometer away from the electoral residence, in which a Renaissance palace was built shortly before in the years 1538 to 1540 in Cölln an der Spree, the predecessor of the Berlin Palace. A riding path connected the Residenz Cölln with the hunting area in the Teltower Heide, from 1792 Spandauer Forst, today's Grunewald. A section of the path, the street Unter den Linden, led from the city palace to the west into the electoral zoo, which was established in 1527. From there the riding path, which was laid out as a Knüppeldamm (Truncheon Dam) due to the swampy terrain, continued in a southwesterly direction, today's Budapester Straße and Kurfürstendamm.

== The Renaissance Château ==
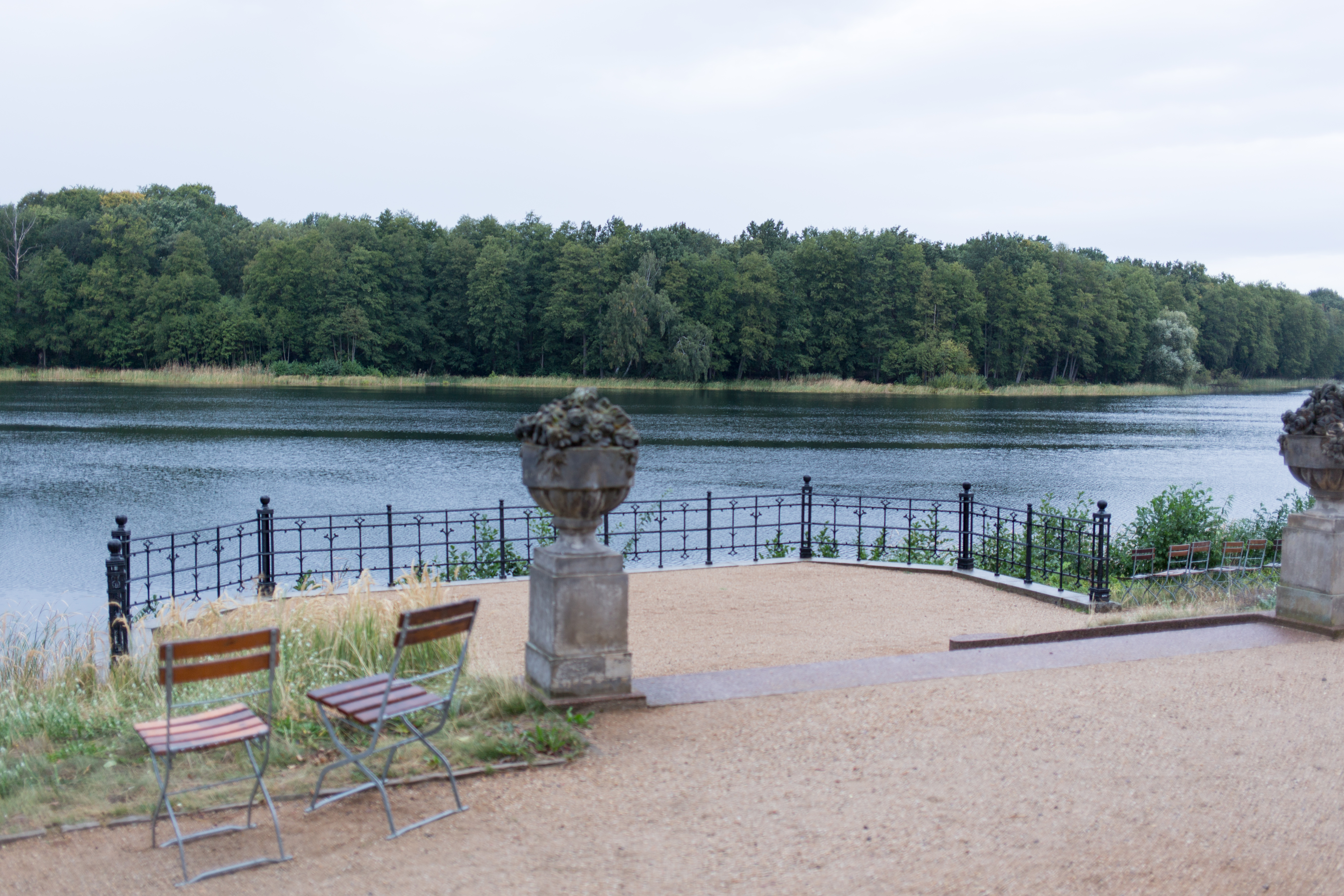
The terrace

=== From Castle to Château ===
The fortified castles, formerly built to secure the sphere of influence according to economic and strategic aspects, which served both as a defensive structure and as an administrative and residential residence, offered hardly any protection due to the further development of small arms and cannons and thus lost more and more of their importance. In addition, the territorial claim to sovereignty of the sovereigns, such as that of the Elector of Brandenburg, whose greatest internal opponent was the landed gentry, had been consolidated. With the aim of avoiding armed conflicts and clarifying claims by legal means, Emperor Maximilian I passed an imperial law at the Imperial Diet of Worms on 7 August 1495 to preserve the Ewiger Landfriede, which, however, was not observed by all nobles.

This development led to the transition from castle to palace at the turn of the 15th to 16th centuries. A separation of the different buildings according to their purpose began. In addition to fortifications erected specifically for territorial defence, such as the Spandau Citadel in the Margraviate of Brandenburg, representative palace buildings were built in the establishing European residences as the residence of the princes, in the country mansions of the nobility and castles which were specially designed for hunting.

Influenced by the Renaissance castles of Chambord and Blois of the French King Franz I., a lively building activity developed at the European princely courts. The architectural style of the Renaissance, which had its origins in Italy, was mainly applied decoratively in northern Europe, with the building retaining the traditional local house form. With large windows, balconies, bay windows, high dwarf houses, chimneys and paintings, sometimes also staircase towers, the pompous builders let decorate the roofs and facades. With the construction of magnificent castles and representative town houses in the cities, as well as municipal buildings, the wealth and understanding of art could be presented to the public.

=== The Jagdschloss „Zum grünen Wald“ ===
For the construction of a hunting lodge in the forest area of the Teltower Heide, today's Grunewald, Elector Joachim II acquired from the noble family of Spi(e)l a plot of land on the south-eastern shore of Lake Spi(e)ls, which later became Lake Grunewald, northeast of the village of Dahlem. He had a moated castle built directly on the water castle, which he called Zum grünen Wald.

Only a ground plan drawn up in the middle of the 17th century, the so-called Renaissance plan, the evaluation of building files found in 1916 and excavations in the 1970s, and a reconstruction drawing of the building published by Albert Geyer in 1936 provide information about the palace grounds.

=== The Renaissance Plan ===
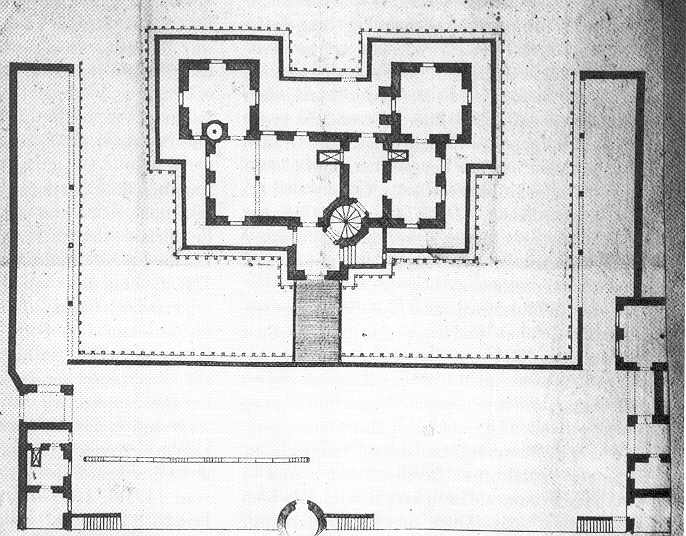
The so-called Renaissanceplan

The evaluation of the Renaissance plan and the building records of the Kurmärkisch Brandenburgischen Amtskammer, then Kurmärkische Kriegs- und Domänenkammer, from the years 1669 to 1737, showed that the hunting lodge was originally built as a moated castle on an 8 m × 21 m platform and surrounded by a moat and in the northwest by the Grunewaldsee. The only access to the castle was via a wooden bridge spanning the moat. The moat surrounding the building was filled in as early as 1709, and the courtyard was given a completely new appearance after leveling. In addition, in the 19th century the Grunewaldsee lake was lowered several times in order to be able to cut peat on the Dahlemer Wiesen, so that the water level has been around 2.80 meter lower since the castle was built.

The originally rectangular building has two almost square tower buildings on the lake side, which the architect Count Rocco Guerrini added after the death of Joachim II in 1571, during the reign of his son John George, Elector of Brandenburg. Around the main building there were some U-shaped outbuildings as well as a wall with a chemin de ronde and a round tower in the middle. The buildings on the southwest side housed a gatehouse and the residence of the castellan, on the north-east side a room for storing hunting gear, a gate room, the entrance gate with an adjoining open arcade and the kitchen. The main house was flanked by elongated buildings that reached as far as the lake. They were opened along the moat by arcades and were used to house hunting dogs, horses and carriages. Although Renaissance architecture largely dispensed with defensive structures, the entire complex and the embrasures in the entrance area still reveal the fortified house. However, the moat, the wall, which was probably equipped with battlements and loopholes, and the later added corner wings, which remind one of fortified towers, were only of aesthetic importance.

=== Reconstruction of the Renaissance building ===
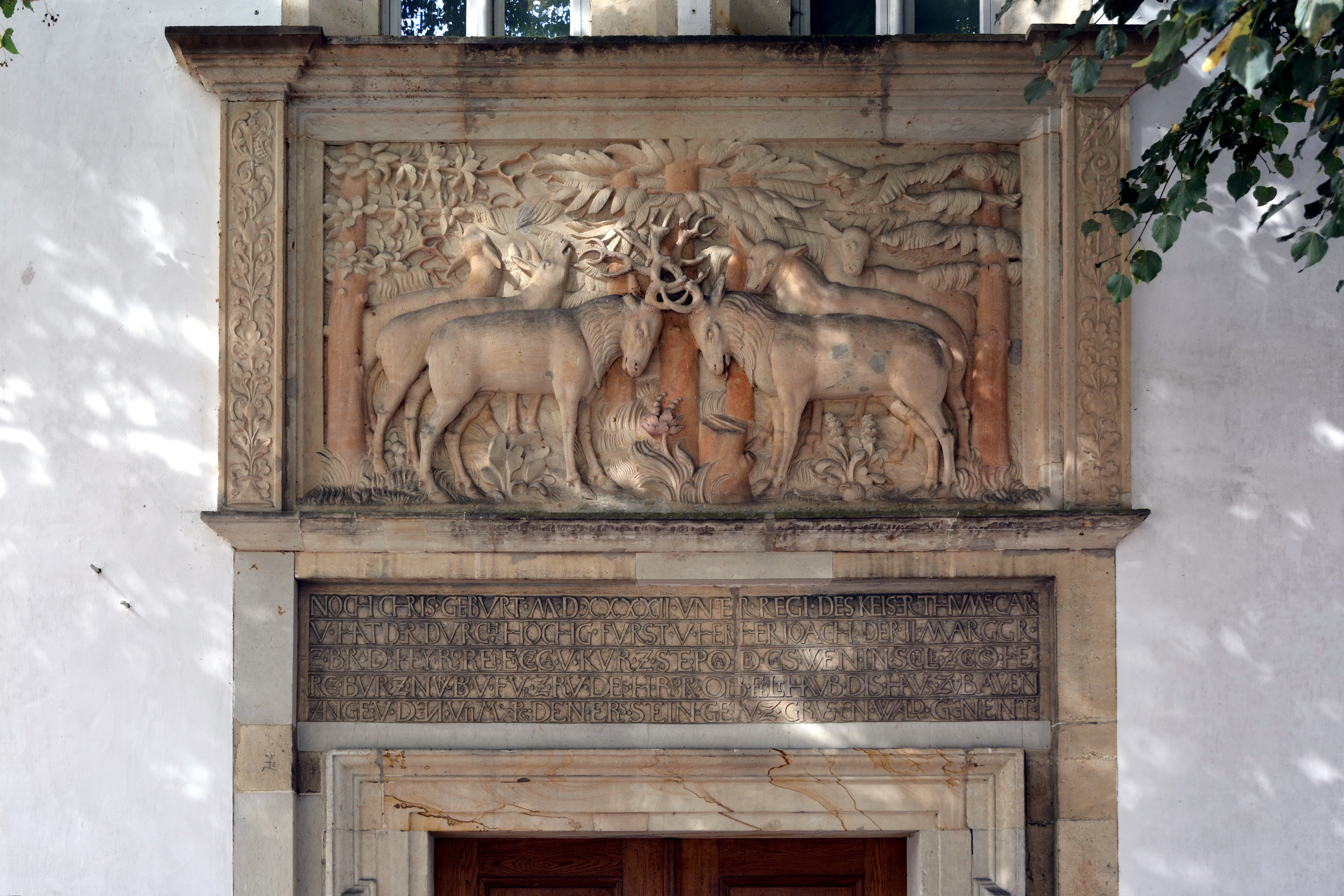
Deer relief and sandstone tablet above the entrance portal

The building records contained entries of individual repair and reconstruction measures, from which it emerged that some of the decorative Renaissance building elements had been thrown into the moat filled in during 1709 during a reconstruction carried out between 1705 and 1708. After excavations in the 1970s, a reconstruction drawing could be made on the basis of the found components. The evaluation showed that the base area of the castle had not changed, but the outline had. The today uniformly three-storey building originally consisted of a two-storey main house with the three-storey tower-like corner wings facing the lake, an octagonal staircase tower at the front, a so-called staircase tower and another in the connection between the main house and the western corner wing. The protruding entrance building, which still exists on the courtyard-facing front, was adjoined on both sides by a single-storey ancillary building. The windows had round, lead-cased panes. A building component already used in the late Gothic period are the oriels on the bay window towards the lake side, which have also survived. They were missing in almost every building of the 16th century. In addition to their function as a loosening up facade decoration, they also emphasised the importance of the interiors behind them.

The main house and the corner wings had gable roofs covered with plain tile, probably inclined by 45–50 degrees. The octagonal curved bell canopy of the stair towers were covered with slate in "Old German covering" "altdeutscher Deckung". Numerous chimneys, dormers and high dormers gave the roof a richly decorated structure. The gables of the house roof, the dormer houses and the entrance building had a half concave, half convex curved outline, the so-called keel arch or donkey's back, a medieval arch form from the late Gothic period, which today only exists in Grunewald at the entrance building.

=== Owner builder and master builder ===
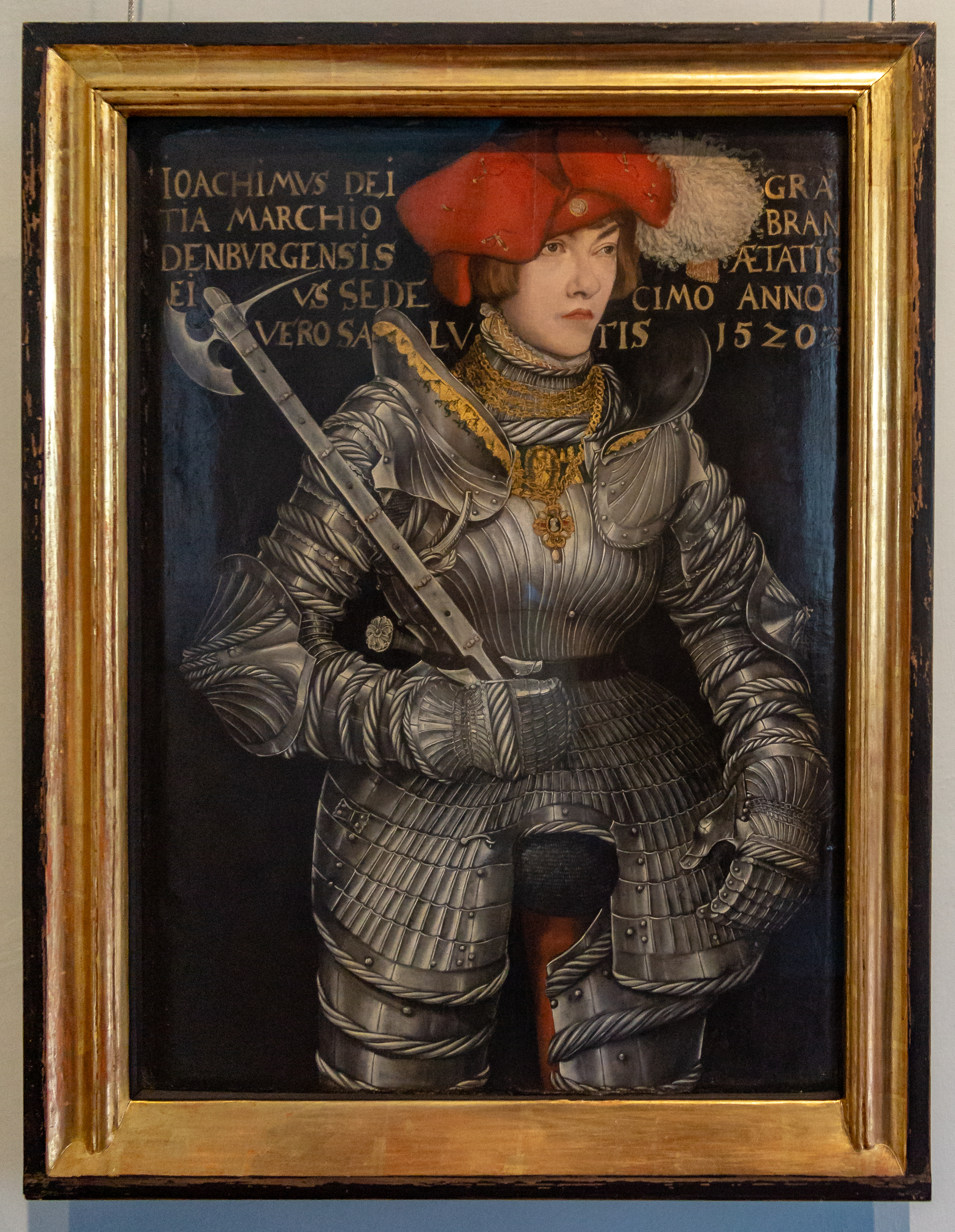
Painting of Prince Elector Joachim II of Brandenburg by Lucas Cranach the Elder, around 1520.

During the reign of Joachim II, Renaissance architecture also found its way into the Margraviate of Brandenburg. He received inspiration for the design of his buildings from his cousin, the Saxon Elector Johann Friedrich I, who had Hartenfels Castle built in Torgau in 1533 by master builder Konrad Krebs. According to his plans and the Torgau model, the Kurmärkische Residenzschloss in Cölln an der Spree was built in 1538. Caspar Theiss also came to Brandenburg with the Saxon master builder Krebs, who was commissioned with the construction management. Little is known about his origins. However, numerous Renaissance buildings in the Mark are attributed to him, and he is said to have been involved in their planning and management. In the entrance room of the hunting lodge his name can be found on a stone slab above the cellar door.

The welcome drink is served on the relief above, the Zecherrelief. According to the inscription the pictures show Caspar Theiss and the building scribe Kunz Buntschuh. There are various details about the third person in the literature. Elector Joachim II, a nobleman or an electoral official and the sculptor Hans Schenk, called Scheutzlich, are suspected.

Whether Caspar Theiss was the master builder of Grunewald Castle cannot be clarified by the stone relief, as it is not certain whether it already found its place here in the time when the castle was built. Doubts are cast by the door frame renewed in 1705, which lies under the text plate, and the slightly shifted plate, which does not hang vertically on top of each other, and the relief. There are also no documents that could give any reliable information about the master builder. Due to his degree of popularity and his leading role in numerous building projects under Joachim II, it can be assumed that Theiss also designed the Grunewald hunting lodge architecturally.

== The reconstruction under Friedrich I. ==
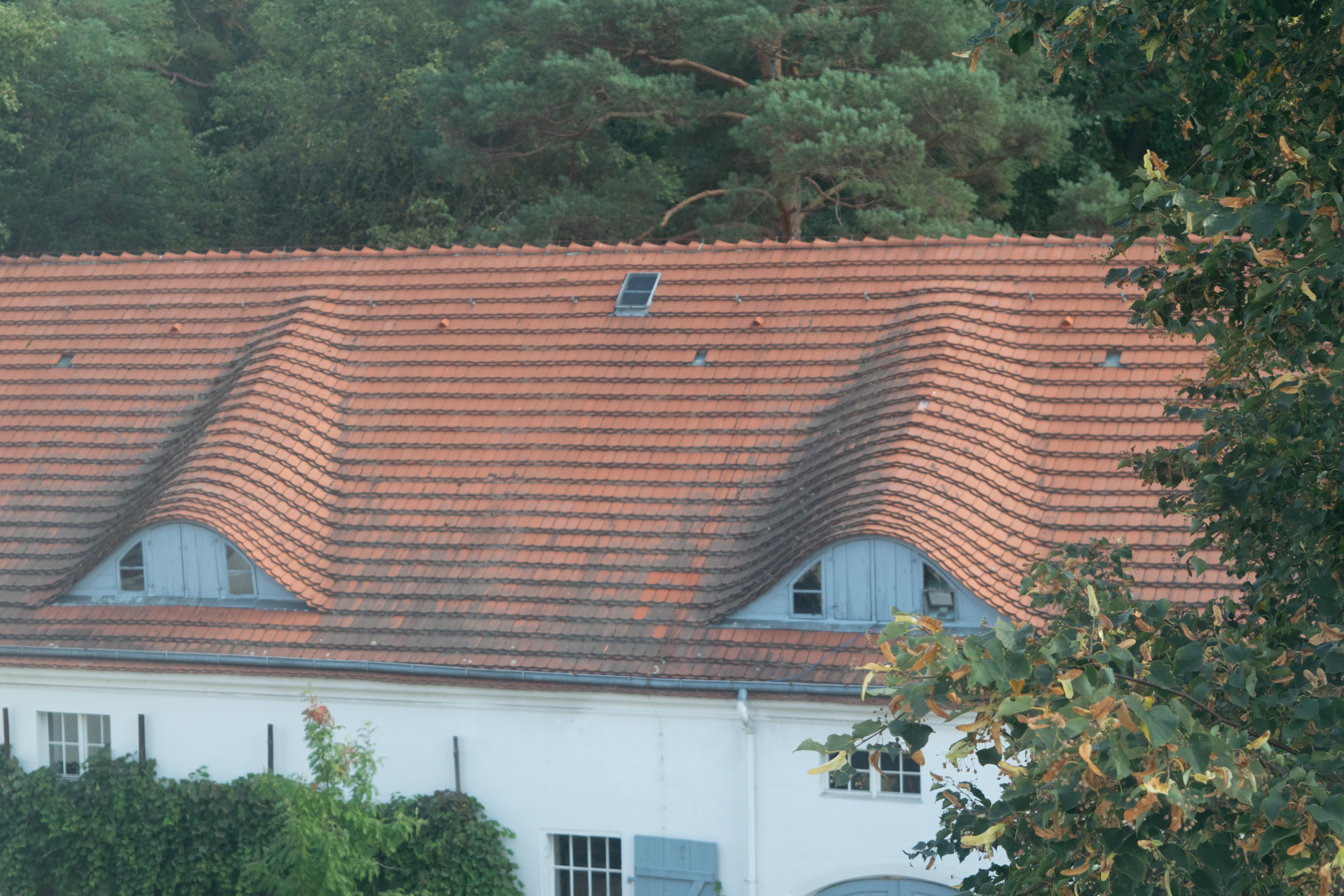
Roof of the Jagdmuseum

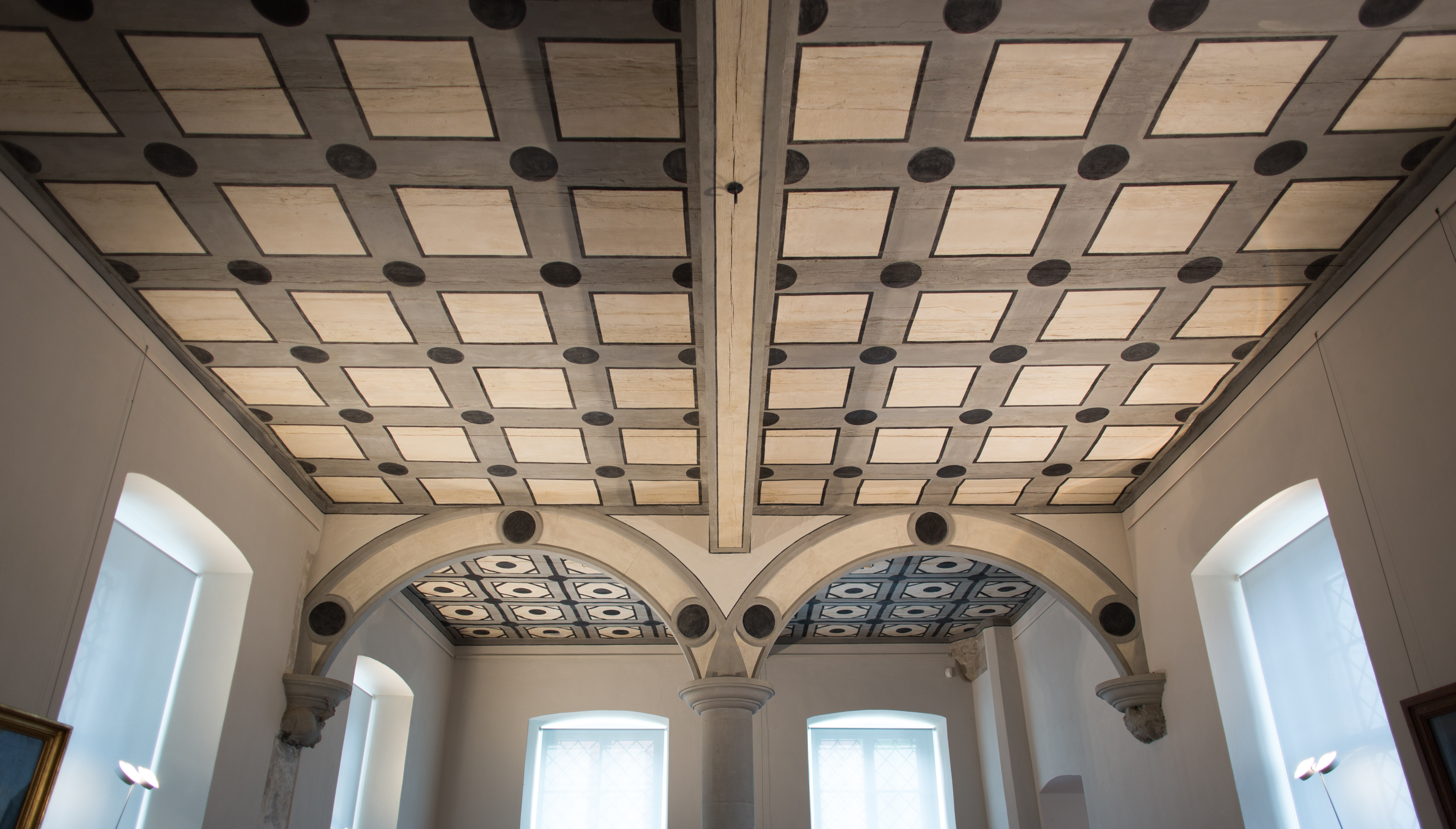
Large courtyard parlour

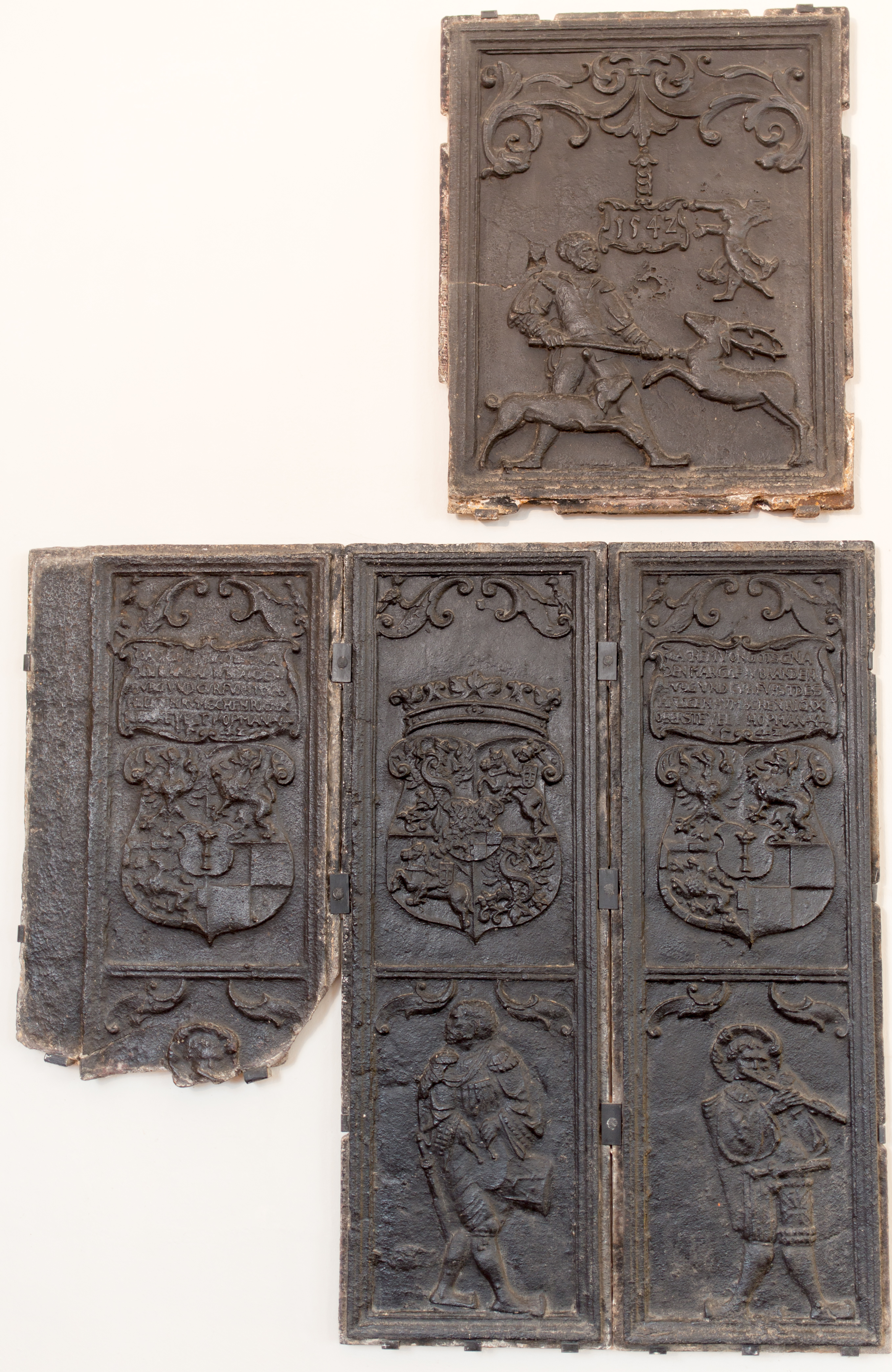
Stove plates of an iron box stove from 1542

=== Increase and change of the roof zone ===
Except for the corner wings, which were attached to the main building under Elector Johann Georg, no major alterations by the successors of Joachim II are known. Due to the building files found, repair work can only be proven again under the Great Elector Friedrich Wilhelm. In 1669 he gave the order "to repair the Grünewald hunting lodge which had been destroyed and had fallen into disrepair and to have it rebuilt" The recurring farm maintenance measures continued into the electoral reign of his son Frederick III.

Johann Arnold Nering, who during these years was the court architect in the electoral service, died in 1695. His successor Martin Grünberg was commissioned by Frederick I, the first king to rule Prussia since 1701, to carry out major repair and modernization work, as the "Königl. Jagthaus and nearby located buildings have a major repair highly necessary" According to the building records, the inventory was also missing at that time, which suggests that the house was not used during the whole years.

In 1705, in addition to interior conversion work, the richly structured roof zone was changed. The saddle roofs of the corner wings and the main house with its dormer houses and dormers gave way to a mansard hipped roof covering these parts of the building with gable dormers on the long sides for lighting the attics. Previously, the main house and the stair tower at the front were extended and adapted to the three-storey corner wings. The protruding entrance building was retained, but the adjoining buildings on both sides were demolished. After the partial installation of new windows and repairs to the outer facades, the conversion was completed in 1708. This external image of the building has been largely preserved to this day. Only the roof view changed in the 1820s, when the gable dormers were replaced by bat dormers during renewed roof repairs.

Johann Heinrich Behr, the successor of Martin Grünberg, who died in 1706, had already taken over the management of the construction work two years earlier. In 1709 he had the moat filled with roof parts and building rubble filled up and planted with grass, paved the courtyard and built three pleasure and fishing cottages by the lake.

=== The interiors before and after the conversion ===
The modernisation measures mainly concerned the interiors. Simple stucco ceilings were installed, fireplaces and tiled stoves were built to heat the living rooms, and floors, windows and doors were renewed. An unusual location for the layout of rooms in castles from the time of construction is the large courtyard parlour on the ground floor, as the festival halls were usually located on the upper floor. During the reconstruction, the largest room of the house was divided into two rooms by a partition wall. In the 1970s the hall was able to be restored to its original state and is thus the only room in the palace that conveys the Renaissance style. By demolishing the partition wall, a double arcade with a column, also dividing the room, was uncovered. The stucco ceiling, which was drawn in in 1705, concealed the imitation coffered ceiling, which was divided into fields by black and white ceiling painting. The floor, originally made of red brick slabs, could also be restored.

The courtyard room was originally heated by a large box kiln, of which only four cast iron plates have survived. They are the only remains of the interior decoration from the founding period of Grunewald Castle. According to the Renaissance plan, a second, somewhat smaller box kiln was located in a room on the east side of the building. Both were replaced by tiled stoves during the reconstruction in 1705. The narrow, elongated box stoves reaching into the room were flush with the wall on one side and could be heated from a side chamber. These so-called breech loaders were expensive luxury items. They show how much importance Joachim II attached to the hunting lodge, which was certainly representative of its time, especially since the Elector is regarded as one of the greatest promoters of art among the Hohenzollern.

There is no reliable information about the use of the two rooms in the corner wings at the time of Joachim II. However, the two rooms and the heatable room on the east side of the house were additionally equipped with toilets, so-called Priveter, and were therefore certainly not without significance. These garderobe, which were attached to the outer wall of the house above the moat and could be reached from the rooms through narrow door openings, were removed during the reconstruction work in 1705. The walled wall surfaces of the formerly 50 centimetre wide door openings reappeared in 1963 when the house was replastered.

After the reconstruction in 1708, the Hegemeister was assigned the rooms in the eastern area. The royal chambers included the divided court room and the room in the western corner wing, which Friedrich I used as a bedroom. The most elaborately designed stucco ceiling in the entire palace has oval and polygonal coffered panels and is richly decorated with shells and foliage. The furniture of the 18th century no longer exists.

At the time of Joachim II, the private apartments of the electoral couple were on the first floor, which was accessible via the Wendelstein on the front. The elector's living room and bedroom were located in the eastern part of the house, the rooms of the elector in the west. A larger room in the middle, which lay above a part of the court room, probably served as a common dining room. This room and the oriel rooms were also demolished in 1705. The oriels on the corner wings, which are four steps higher than the room floor, have been preserved to this day. Under Frederick I, the rooms on the first floor were used from 1708 to accommodate hunting guests and, according to an inventory from 1710, were partly furnished with bedroom furniture.

Before the extension of the building, there was a large attic in the area of the second floor with two rooms in the uppermost part of the three-storey corner wings. The room in the west tower belonged to the private chambers of Elector Johann Georg and could be reached separately from the oriel room below via a small spiral staircase that still exists today. The access doors to the staircase on the first and second floors, with their semicircular endings, date from the Renaissance. A third door from this period is at the entrance to a room in the entrance building, which can be reached from the first floor.

In the inventory list the rather modest furnishing of the Grunewald hunting lodge of only nine rooms was listed, although the number of rooms in the three-storey building was much higher. This suggests that the second floor had not yet been furnished. Since only the property of the king was inventoried, the living quarters of the Hegemeister are of course not mentioned either.

== The use of the Grunewald hunting lodge ==
=== Hunting passion and Anna Sydow (16th century) ===
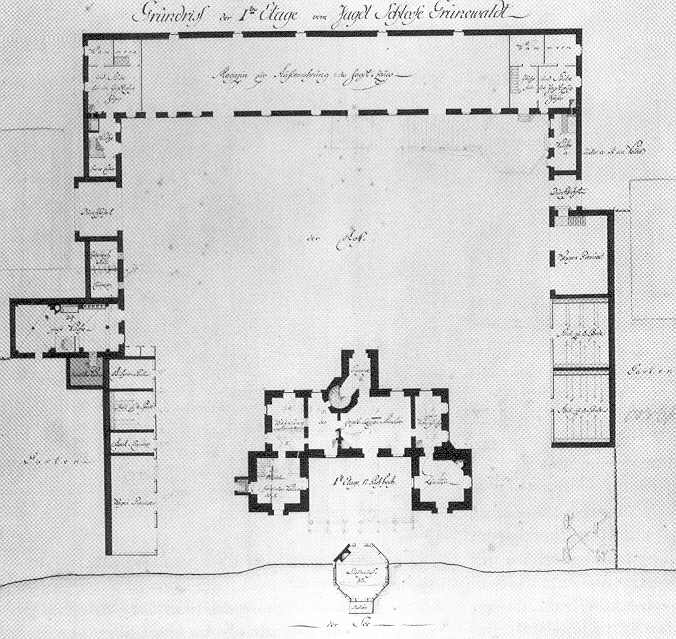
Floor plan of the castle around 1790

Joachim II was a frequent hunter who often used his hunting lodges. For his pastime he received several rebukes from his Landstände, which accused him of "always lying in the wood and waiting for the hunter", however, spending little time on government business. But it was not only the sovereigns who sought diversion in hunting. For the entire court society the hunting events were above all pleasure and pastime. Splendid festivities made them a social event. Hunting lodges were built in the princely territories to accommodate the guests.

The hunting lodge Grunewald was in the time of Joachim II not only a place of stay at hunting events lasting several days, but also two decades a permanent residence of his mistress Anna Sydow, popularly known as the beautiful foundrywoman and wife of the head of the electoral foundry in Grimnitz. After her death she was surrounded by the following story, which in popular belief made her the haunted figure of Grunewald Castle.

In order to escape the monotony of court life, the second wife of the Elector - Hedwig, daughter of the Polish King Sigismund I - and her entourage took part in the hunting pleasures. During a stay in Grimnitz in 1551, the rotten floor under the electoral couple broke away. Joachim II got stuck between the beams and did not injure himself. The elector, however, plunged into the depths, broke her thigh and impaled herself on the hanging antlers in the room below. After that she could only walk on crutches. He took the physical condition of his wife, which was no longer presentable for Joachim II, as an opportunity to get in touch with Anna Sydow. With her he now showed himself in public and often spent many days in the Grunewald hunting lodge in her company and with her child. After Joachim's death in 1571, Anna Sydow came to Spandau Fortress by order of his son Elector Johann Georg, where she died in 1575. However, the superstition that the unfortunate woman had been walled in alive in the wall of the small spiral staircase in the western corner wing and had been haunting the castle since midnight became firmly established among the people.

=== Declining interest in the hunting lodge (17th and 18th centuries) ===
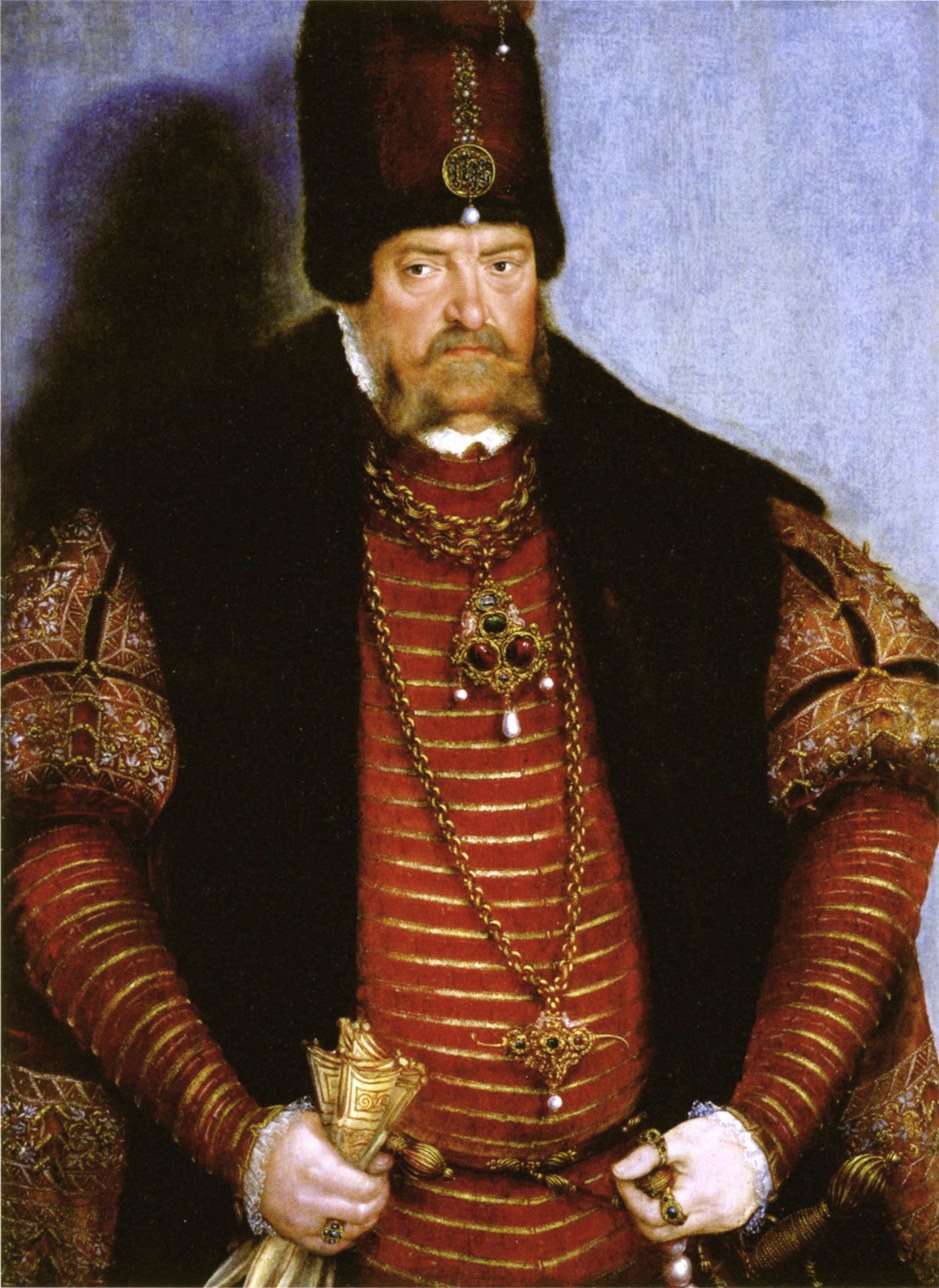
Painting Elector Joachim II of Brandenburg, Lucas Cranach the Younger, around 1570

The Grunewald hunting lodge was neglected for many decades and was therefore not or hardly used by the Brandenburg electors. Due to the repairs carried out under the Great Elector Friedrich Wilhelm, the building could be used again, but he had a new hunting lodge built only a few kilometer southwest of Grunewald, near his residence Potsdam 1683 with Klein-Glienicke.

The Grunewald hunting lodge also played only a minor role for his son Frederick I. Nevertheless, the continuous reports of damage led to the order for modernisation measures. The outbuildings also underwent a change. The stable building on the west side of the main house, originally open to the former moat, was replaced by a two-storey building. On the ground floor there was space for the accommodation of the carriages, on the upper floor the castellan received an apartment. A half-timbered stable was attached to it towards the lake. In the north-east the arcade between the entrance gate and the kitchen was bricked up and new stables were built in front of the wall in the south-east.

Like many of his predecessors, the soldier king Frederick William I was a passionate hunter. He often hunted in the Grunewald, but never used the castle for longer stays. For his excessive hunting he favoured the forest area around Königs Wusterhausen, whose dominion and castle he was given by his father Friedrich I at the age of ten, as well as a farmer's heath southeast of his residence Potsdam, which he had developed between 1725 and 1729 for the organisation of par force hunts - the so-called par force heath since then. The Stern hunting lodge was built in 1730 in the centre of the complex. As early as 1734, renewed damage to the roof of the main house in Grunewald and dilapidated fishing cottages were reported. Since 1734 the term "castle" has been used in the documents.

With Frederick the Great's accession to power in 1740, the hunting lodge finally lost its importance. In contrast to his ancestors - the exception being Johann Sigismund - he rejected hunting as a pastime. In the book Anti-Machiavel, in which he wrote down his thoughts about the tasks and goals of the exercise of princely power during the Crown Prince's reign, he described them as one of the sensual pleasures that move the body very much and do not improve the mind. On June 22, 1765, Frederick the Great gave the order to store the hunting equipment of the Berlin hunting yard at the Friedrichswerder in an annex to the Grunewald hunting lodge. In order to be able to take up the Berlin inventory, a stable in the south of the court had to be enlarged on both sides, "from 207 feet" (about 65 meters) to a "total length of 535 feet" (about 168 meters). In the new hunting equipment magazine the equipment required for the various types of hunting found room, but not the weapons, which were accommodated in armory and armory.

Like Frederick the Great, his nephew and successor Frederick William II was not interested in hunting. For occasional stays he had three rooms on the first floor of the hunting lodge furnished. In 1788 Johann Friedrich Nagel commissioned him to create a painting with a view of the castle from the northeast and only one remaining fishing cottage at Grunewaldsee, which was also demolished around 1903. It is the oldest pictorial document of the hunting lodge.

=== Revival and Hubertus hunting (19th century) ===
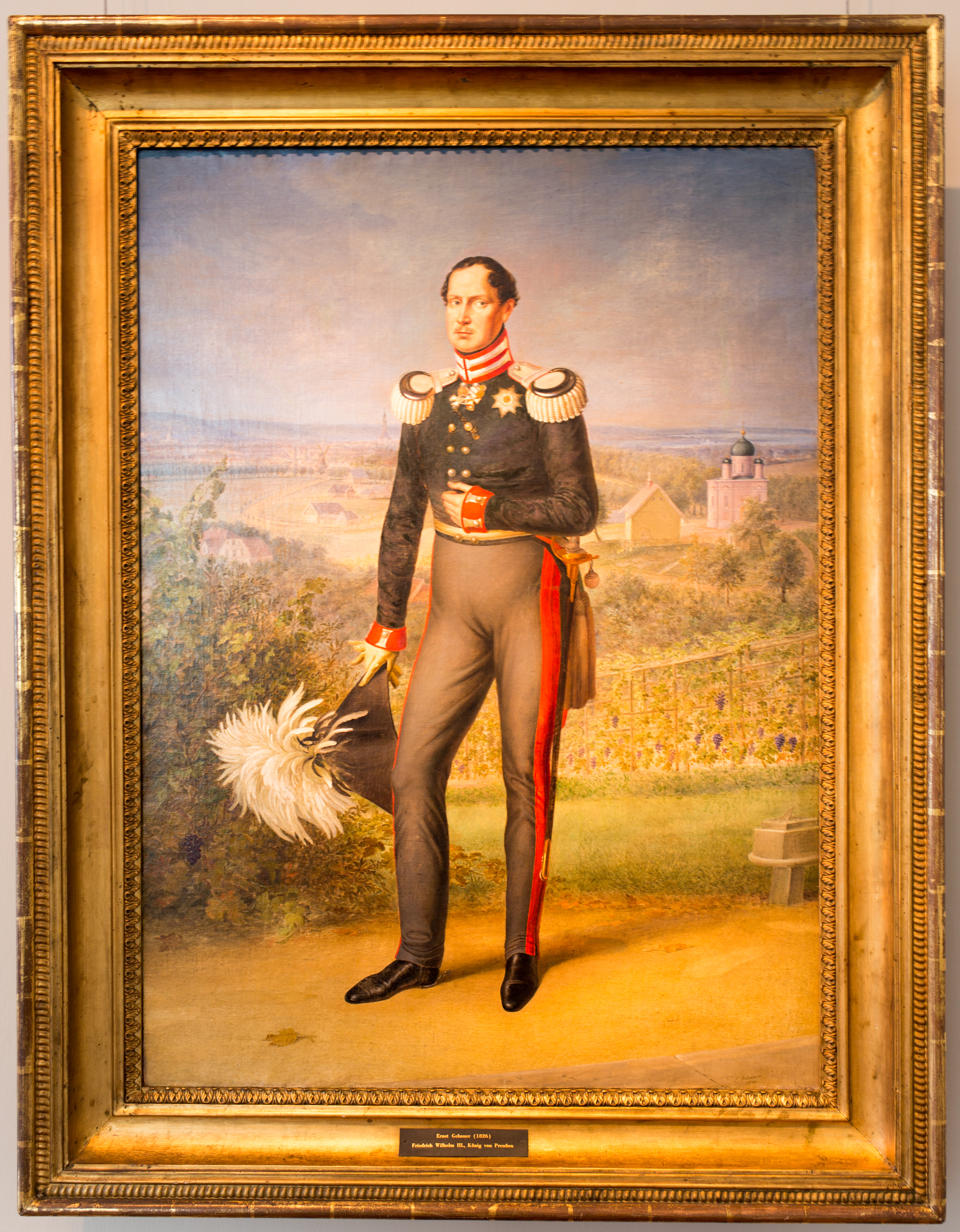
Frederick William III by Ernst Gebauer 1826

Frederick William III, on the Prussian throne since 1797, also used the hunting lodge only for occasional stays. He also found no pleasure in hunting. But during his reign, in May, 1814, Grunewald briefly became an attraction for the Berlin population. During the Napoleonic Wars, the French emperor had the Quadriga of the Brandenburg Gate brought to Paris as booty in December 1806. After the Battle of Paris at the end of March 1814 and Napoleon's defeat, it was brought back to Prussia. Packed in boxes, the work of sculptor Johann Gottfried Schadow stood in Grunewald for a few days before being transported to Berlin.

The building records of the Royal Court Marshal's Office also contain records of various repair works, which increased during the 1820s. These led to a reroofing of the main house, in which the dormers from the 1705 reconstruction were removed and replaced by five bat dormers.

In the same decade, interest in the Grunewald hunting grounds, too, grew again. Through the sons of Friedrich Wilhelm III, the princes Friedrich Wilhelm, Wilhelm, and, above all, at the instigation of Carl, the par force hunt, also known as the Red Hunt, was revived on 8 February 1828. Until the abandonment of the hunting ground at the beginning of the following century, hunting events took place regularly. The annual Hubertus hunt on 3 November was of particular importance; state guests took part in it, including (in 1864) the Russian Tsar Alexander II from the house of Romanov. The thousandth par force hunt was celebrated at Grunewald in 1863 under Wilhelm I, who had ruled since 1861. Of the 2,000 par force hunts held by the court in the various hunting grounds around Berlin between 1828 and 1897, 638 were carried out in the Grunewald alone. The hunting lodge had meanwhile been re-equipped with all kinds of furniture and utensils.

In January of 1891, the Kotze Affair, one of the biggest sex scandals in the German Empire under Emperor Wilhelm II, took place at the hunting lodge. Fifteen ladies and gentlemen of the aristocratic court society held an orgy there, as soon became known nationwide. Leberecht von Kotze was arrested after being accused of disparaging through published letters the other participants in the orgy. Following his release from prison and acquittal, Kotze fought two duels with other male participants; he was wounded in the first duel and killed Karl von Schrader in the second.

=== Museum use of the hunting lodge (20th and 21st centuries) ===
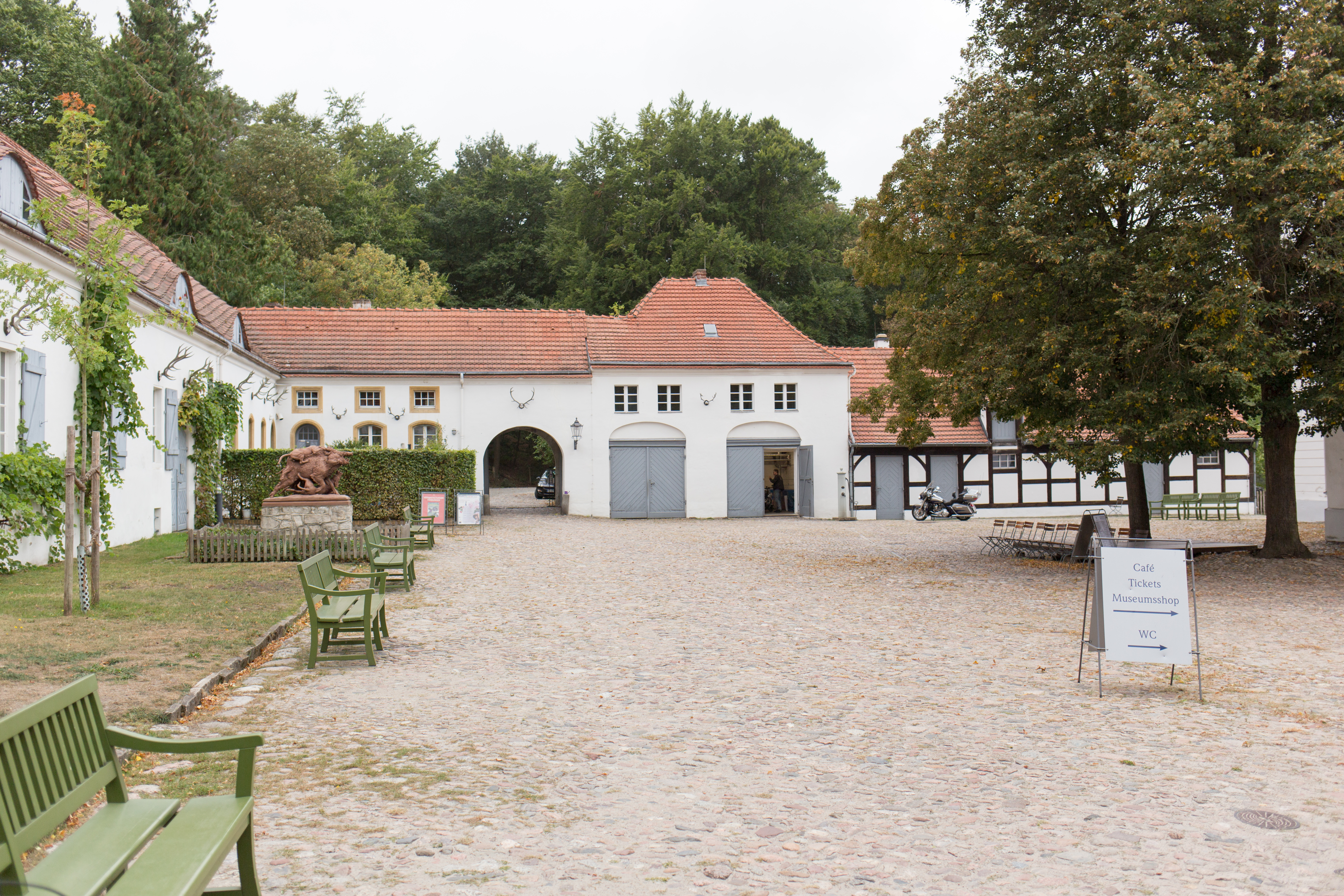
Courtyard of the hunting lodge 2018

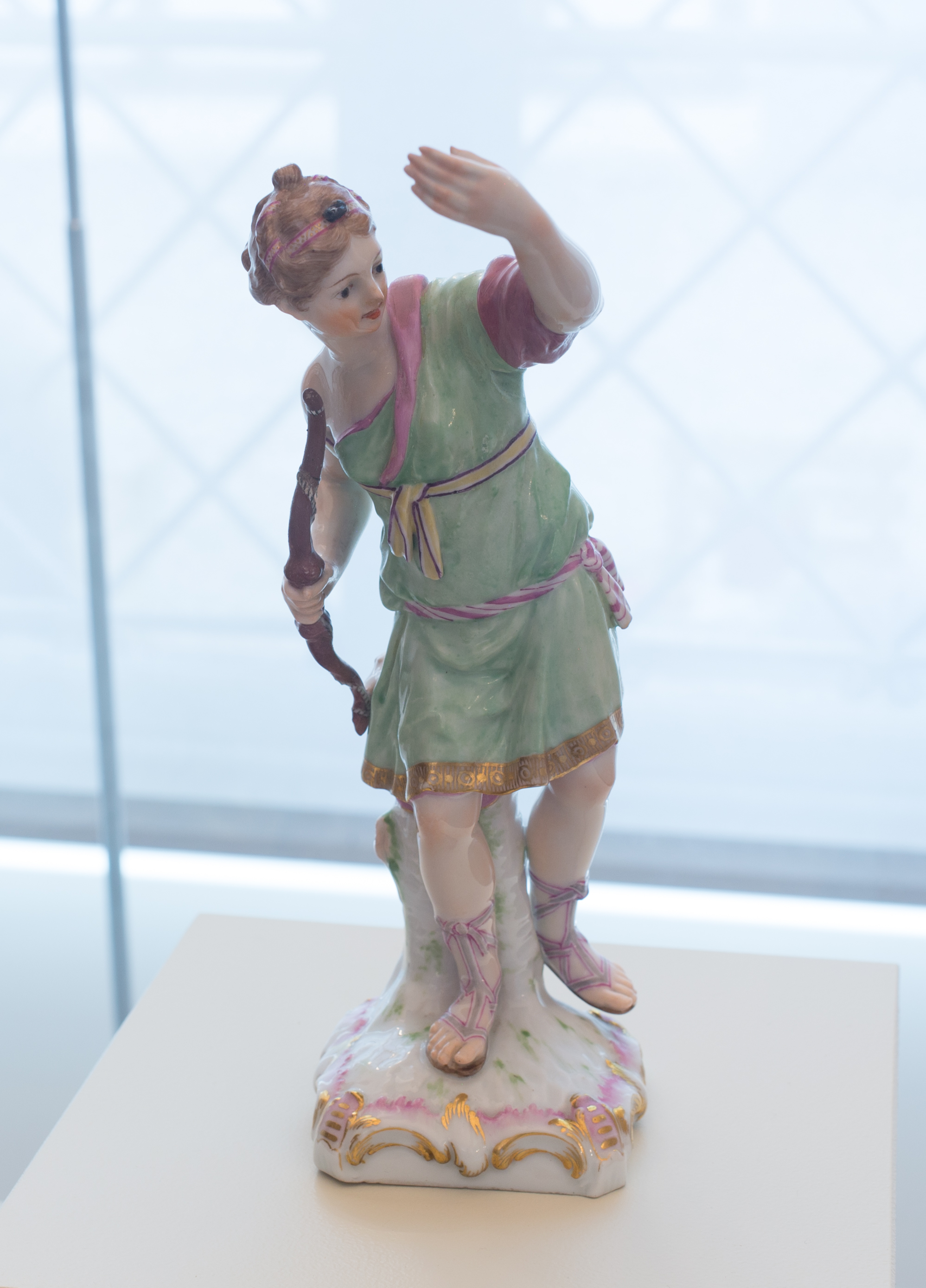
Diana by Wilhelm Cristian Meyer 1769 KPM

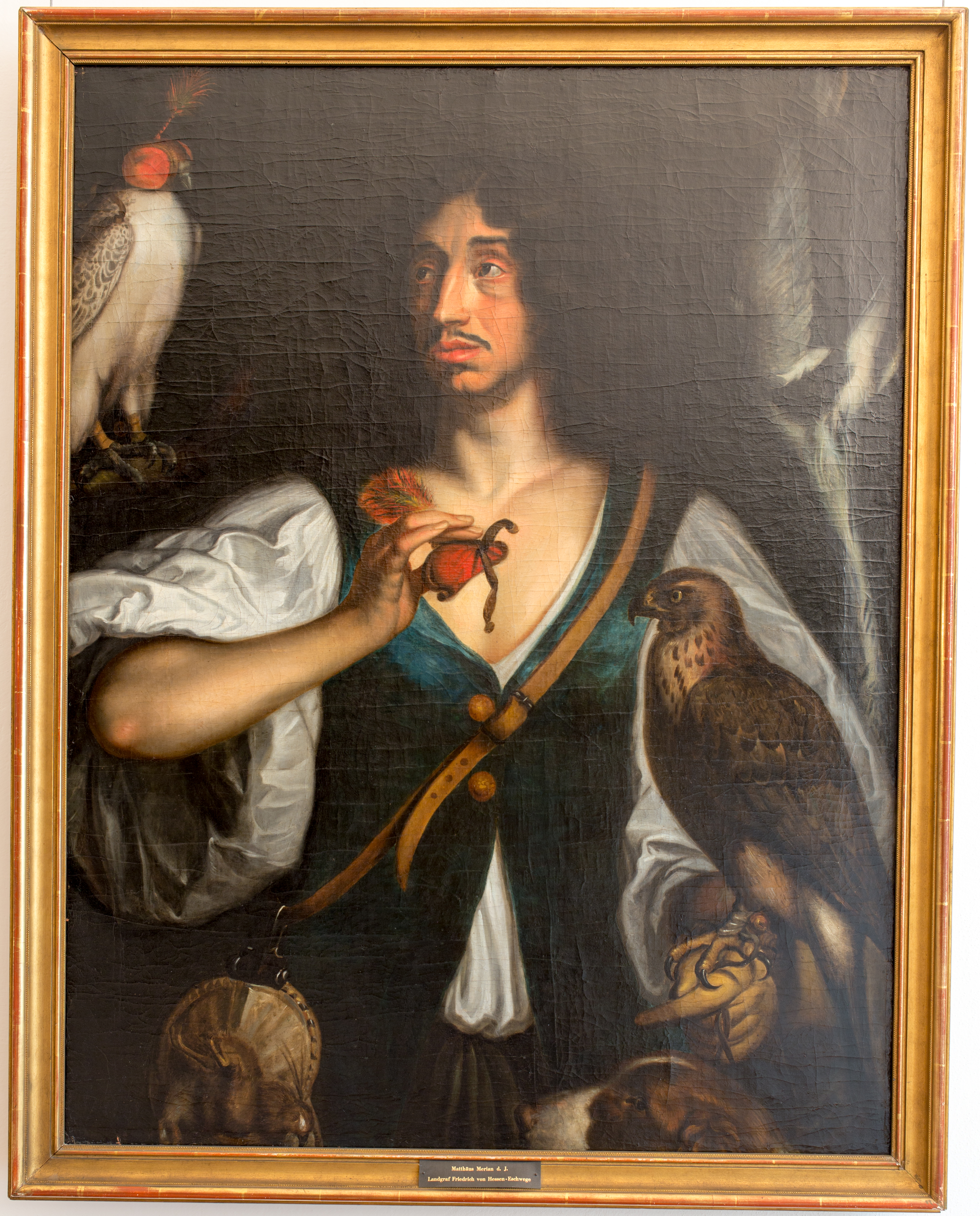
Landgraf Friedrich by Matthäus Merian the Younger

As early as the mid 19th century, Berliners discovered the Grunewald and the Seenkette -- the Hundekehle-, Grunewald- and Schlachtensee as well as Krumme Lanke -- as local recreation areas. During the same period, the forested area of the hunting grounds became smaller and smaller as the city of Berlin, military facilities, railway lines, and roads increased, so that some par force hunts were instead held on the Par force heath and at the hunting lodge Stern as early as the end of the 19th century. In 1907, the Grunewald was finally abandoned as a hunting ground. The permanent forest contract of 1915 between the Zweckverband Groß-Berlin and the Prussian Forest Administration finally designated large parts of the Grunewald as local recreation areas.

Despite the developments, the last German Emperor Wilhelm II had some contemporary modernisation measures carried out in the castle between 1901 and 1908. In addition to roof repairs, details of the renovation are no longer traceable, but toilets and bathrooms were brought to the upper floor and the demolition of some tiled stoves led to the discovery of the four remaining cast-iron plates of the box stoves from the Renaissance.

After the First World War and the end of the monarchy, the assets, land and real estate of the House of Hohenzollern were confiscated by the new government. After the passing of the "Act on the Dispute of Property between the Prussian State and the Members of the Formerly Governing Prussian Royal House" on 26 October 1926, the Grunewald Hunting Lodge came into the possession of the Prussian State, passing into the care of the Prussian Administration of State Castles and Gardens after its founding in 1927. In 1932, the Administration set up a museum in the building with furniture from the 17th to 19th centuries and 16th- and 17th-century German and Dutch paintings. In addition to 29 existing paintings with hunting motifs, 153 paintings from the holdings of various Hohenzollern castles were added.

==== The collection of paintings ====
During the Second World War, the hunting lodge survived the heavy bombardments of Berlin unscathed. However, fighting in the last days of the war damaged some works of art and seventeen paintings were missing after looting by members of the Soviet occupying power.

With the permission of the American headquarters, the museum was reopened on 16 May 1949, and after the war it became the first Berlin art museum to re-open to the public. The collection in Grunewald Castle was further expanded by the removal of works of art from the destroyed Berlin Palace and Monbijou Palace. In addition, there were the three-winged altarpiece of the early 15th century, from the town church in Cadolzburg demolished in 1750, some paintings by Lucas Cranach the Elder, such as Judith with the Head of the Holofernes, and the portrait of 65-year-old Joachim II by Lucas Cranach the Younger. Some pictures from the booty were also returned, such as a presumably old copy of the Fall of Man by Jan Gossaert and the Lucretia by Lucas Cranach the Elder, both from the 16th century, and the small painting "Smoking Women" by the Leiden painter Jan Steen from the 17th century. The painting "Lady with Parrot" by the Leiden painter Willem van Mieris, which has also been recovered, has been kept in the Cabinet at Caputh Castle since 2004.

After many years of renovation work, Berlin's largest Cranach collection has been on display here since 2011. These include nine large-format central panels from a Passion cycle of 1537/38 from the collegiate church of the former Dominican monastery in Cölln, as well as four large-format copy plates with the Sovereign virtues of courage, moderation, justice and wisdom, which were probably created in 1540/1545 for a room in the Stechbahnflügel of Cöllner Castle. The exhibits include German and Dutch paintings from the 15th and 16th centuries, most of which the Prussian royal house acquired at the beginning of the 19th century from the collection of the English merchant Edward Solly. The permanent exhibition also contains portraits of Brandenburg-Prussian rulers and members of their families, paintings and equipment with hunting motifs, and various types of presentation of hunting trophies.

==== The Hunting Museum ====
A hunting museum was opened on 29 January 1977 in the former hunting goods magazine of Frederick the Great, which after reconstruction had a hall length of 38 meters. The original equipment no longer exists, so mainly arquebusses and pistols from the second third of the 16th century to the 18th century are exhibited; of these, about one hundred wheellock weapons come from the inventory of the former Berlin armoury and a large part from the collection of Prince Carl of Prussia. The museum also features trophies of deer, fallow deer, and elk as well as roebuck horns, which were previously in the hunting lodge.

==== The castle as a film backdrop ====
As early as 1967, the castle served as the backdrop for shots for the Edgar Wallace film adaptation Creature with the Blue Hand, with Klaus Kinski in a double role, later as the location for the film Wild Geese II, and from 1997 to 2007 as the external backdrop for the children's series Schloss Einstein of the KiKa. Outdoor shots for the series "Verliebt in Berlin" also took place there.

== Images ==
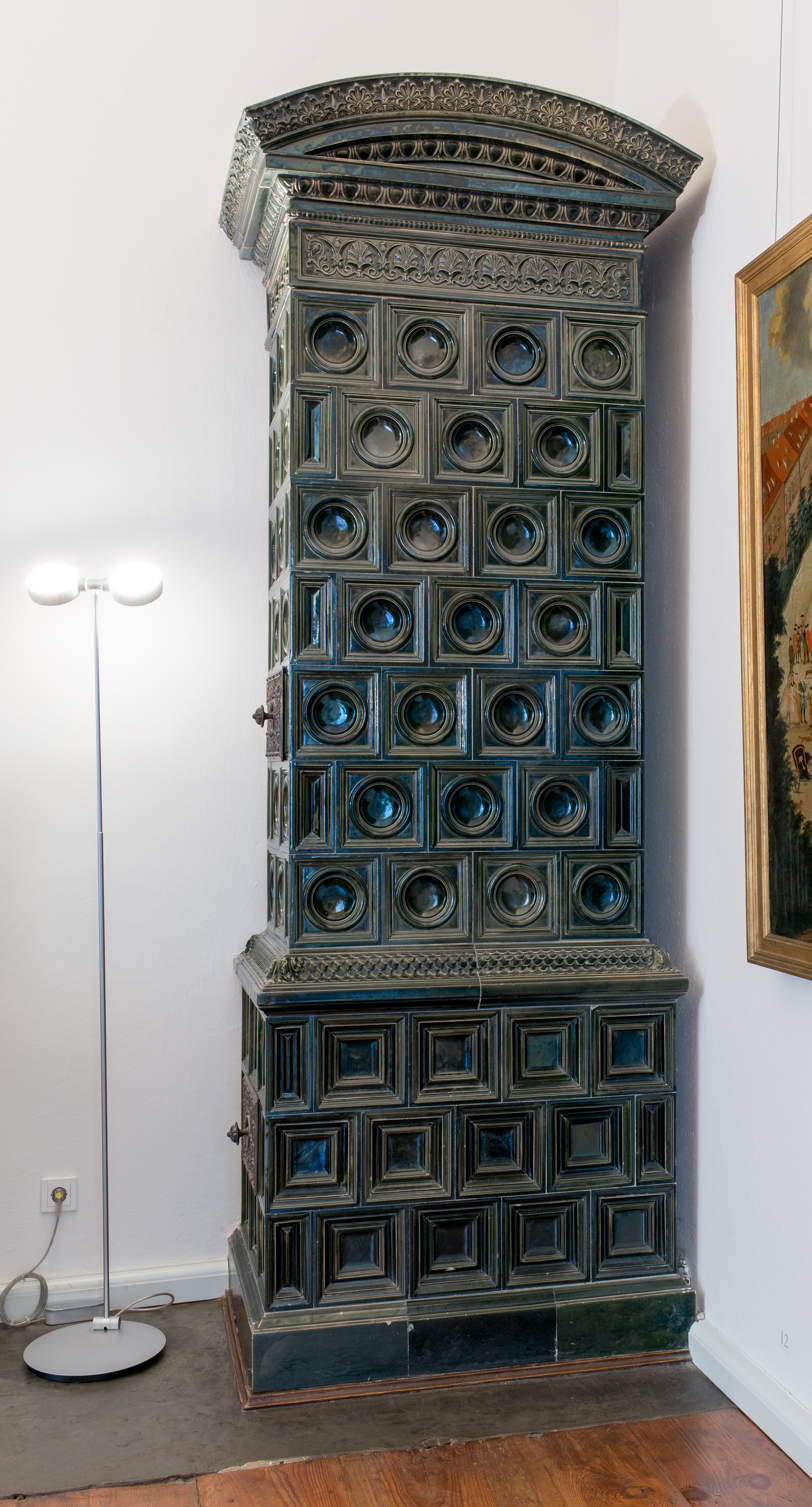
Masonry heater

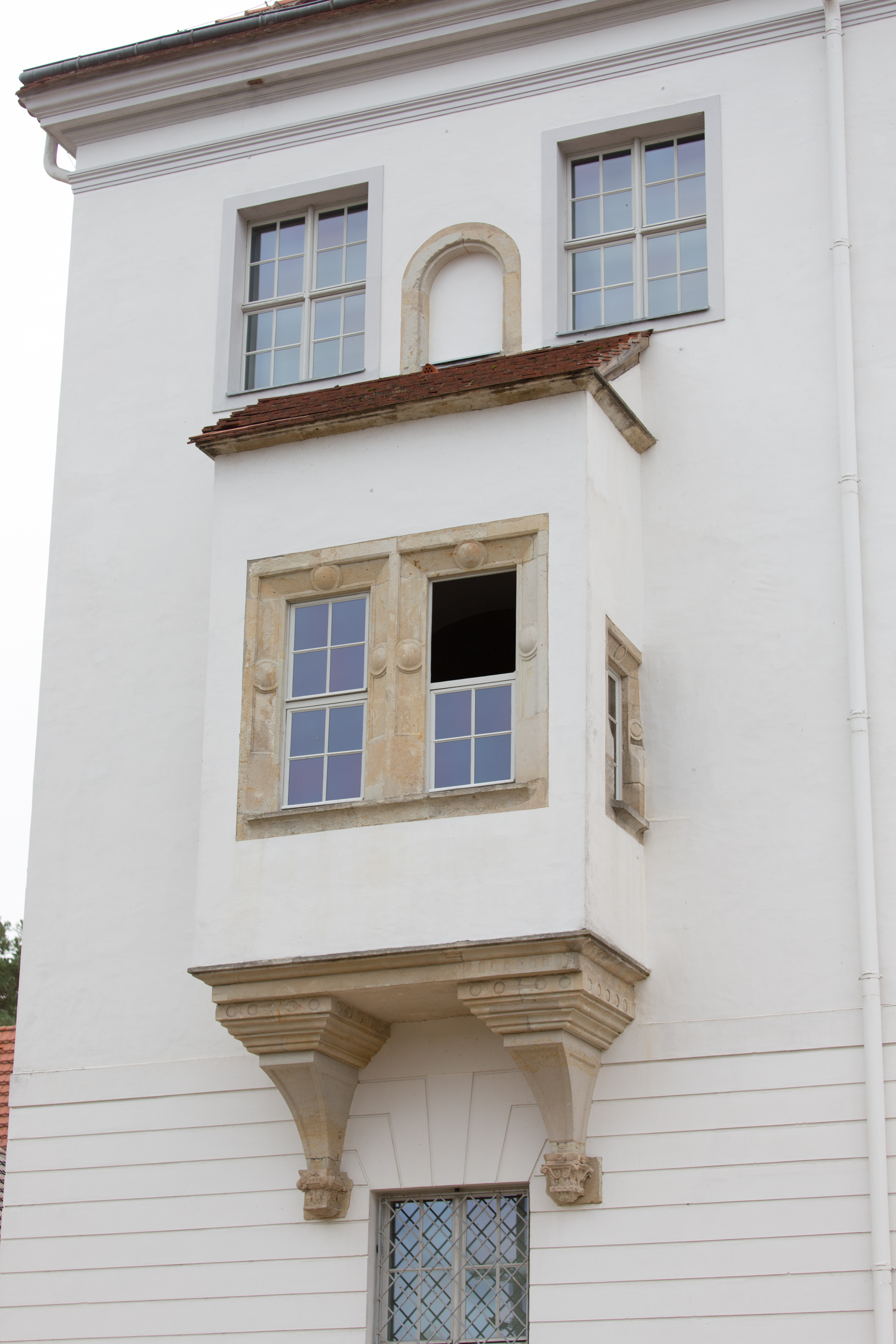
Bay window

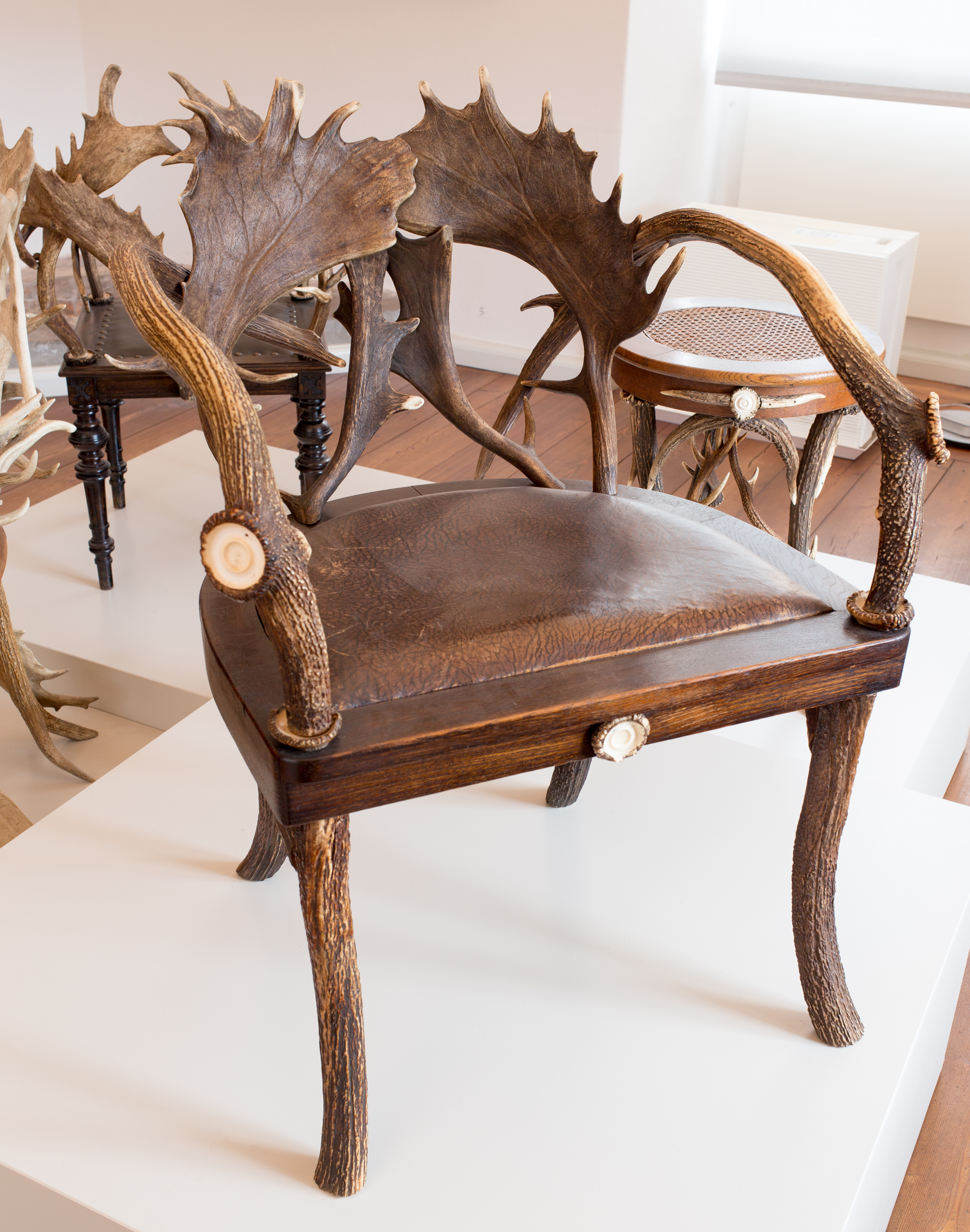
Antler furniture

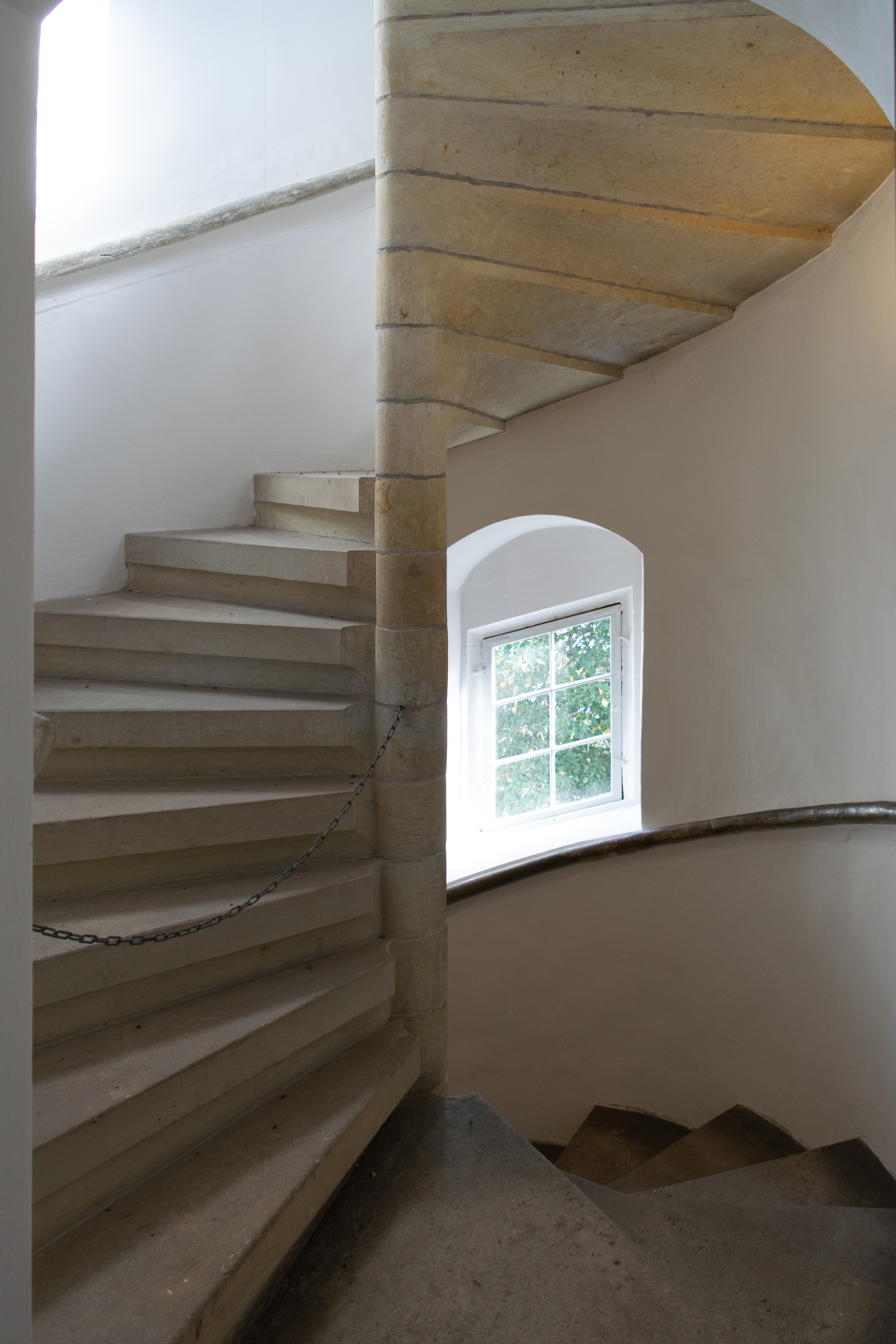
Spiral staircase

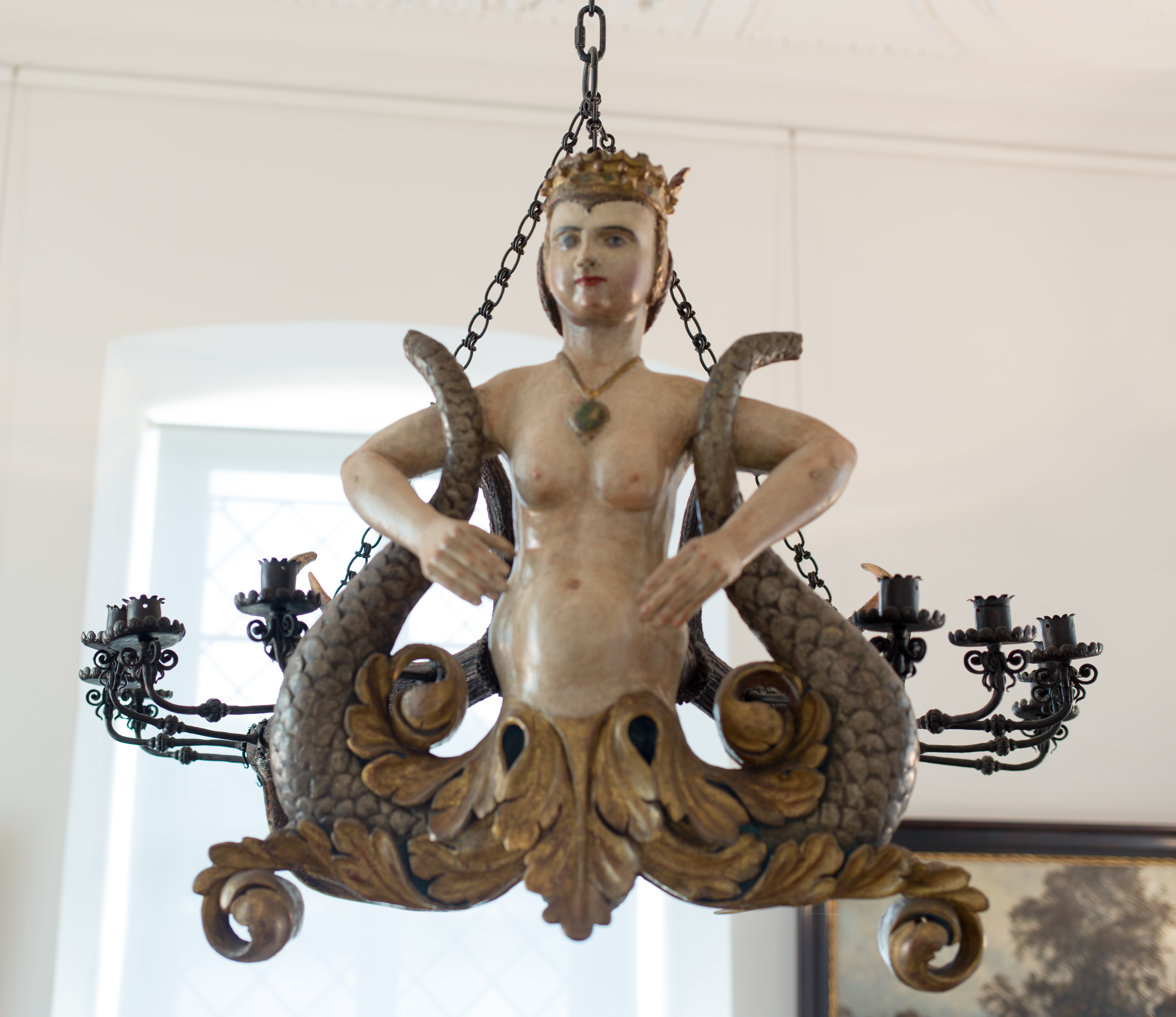
Lusterweibchen

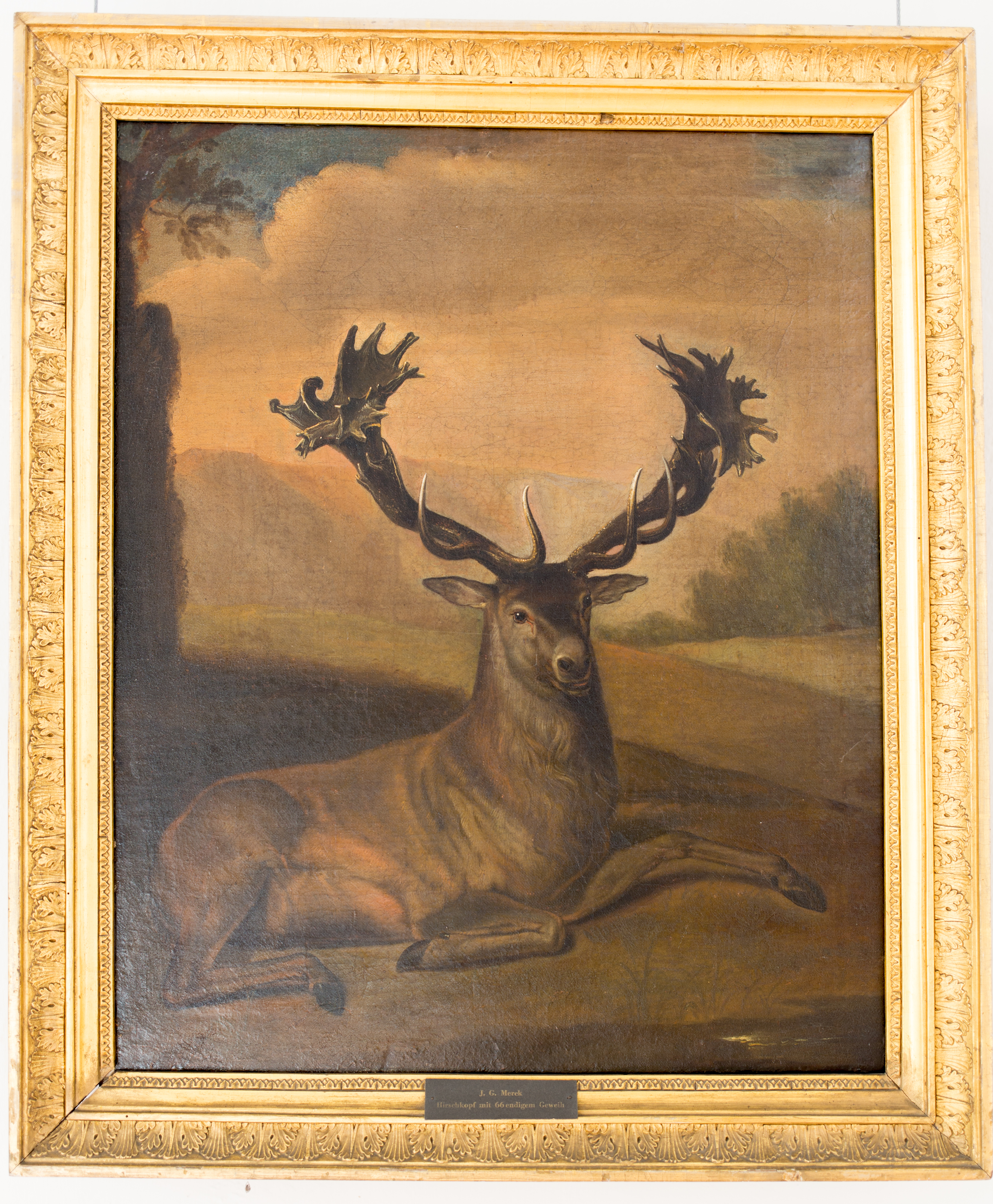
Deer with 66 ends

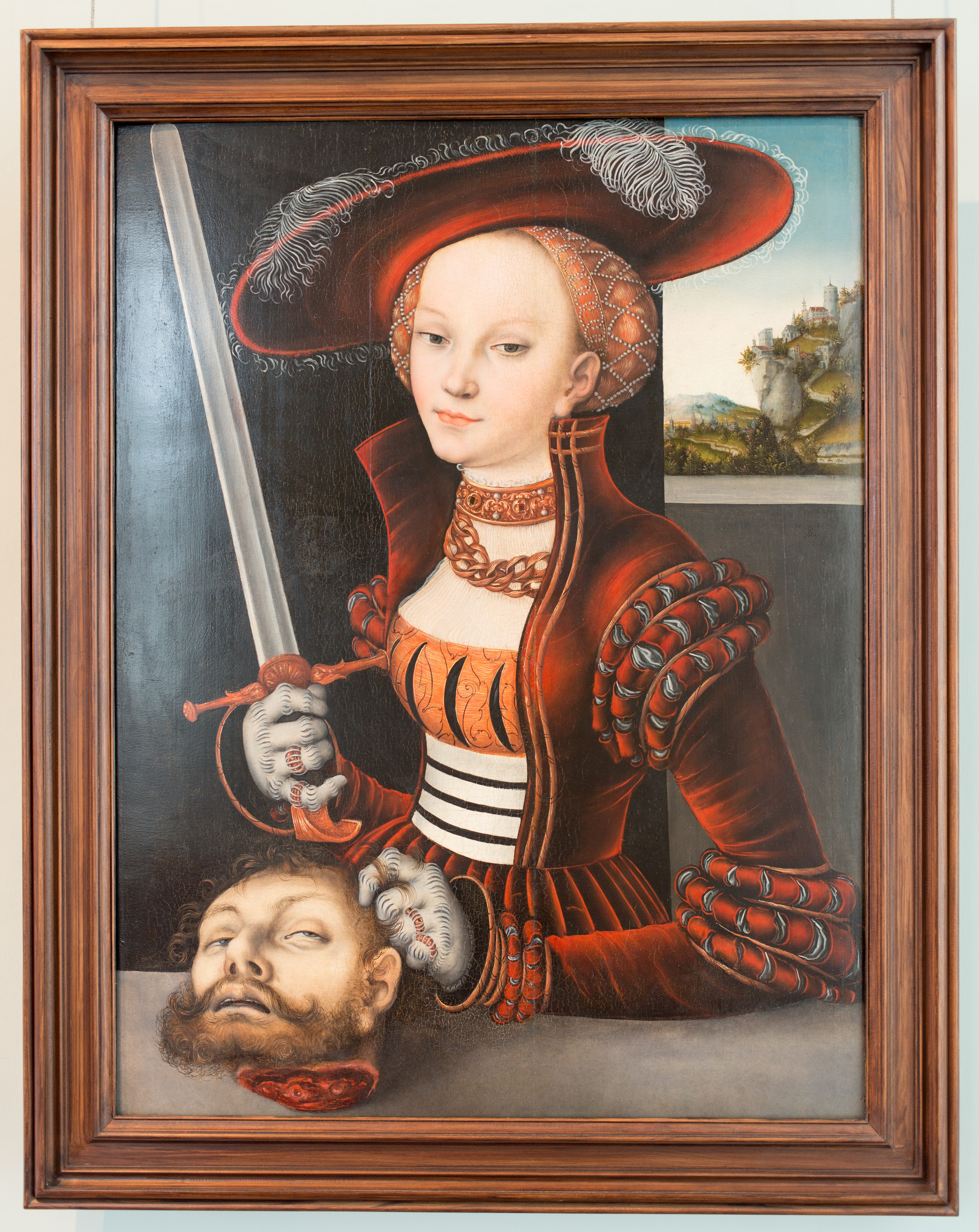
Judith with the head of the Holofernes of Lucas Cranach the Elder.

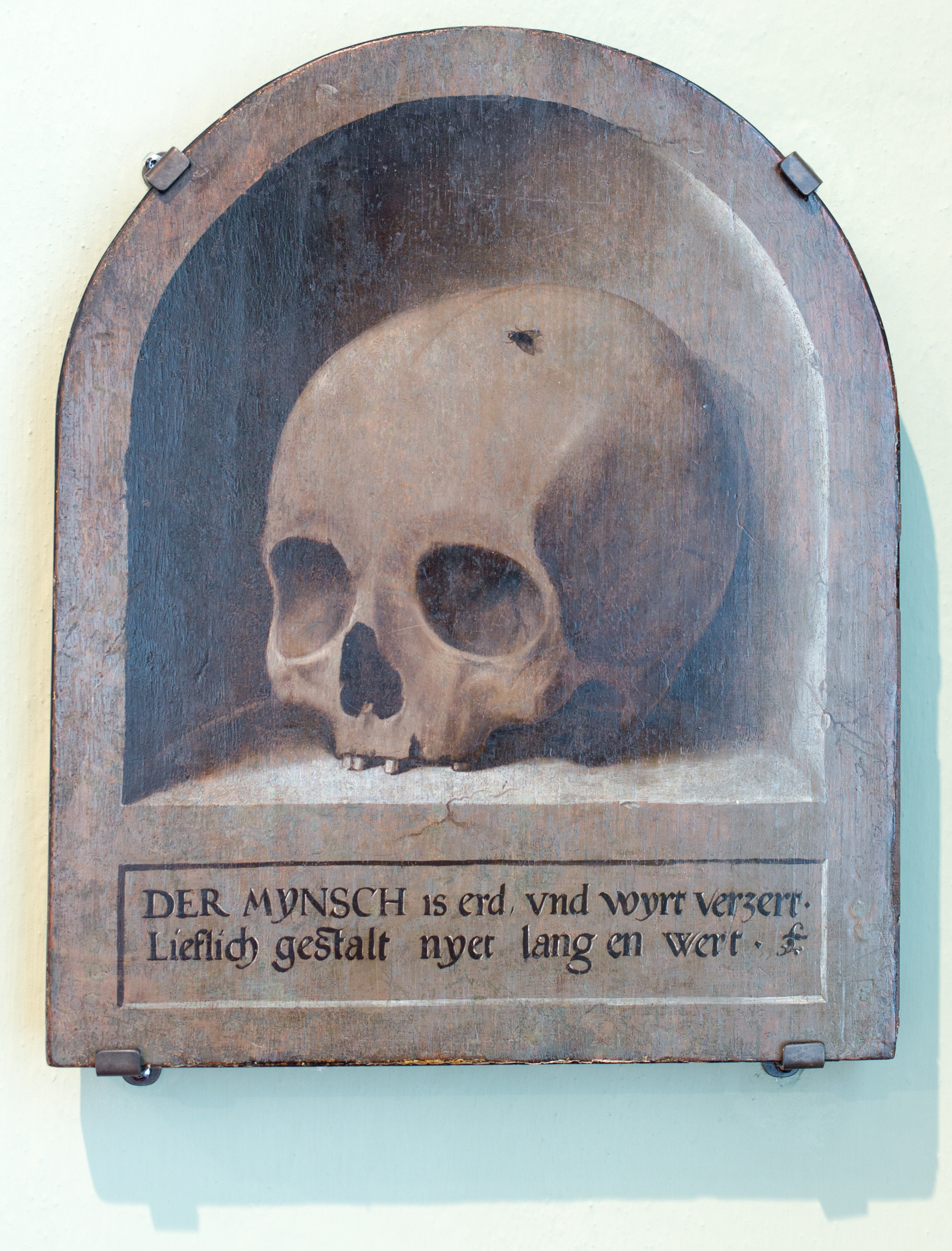
Vanitass still life in the style of Bartholomew Bruyn the Elder

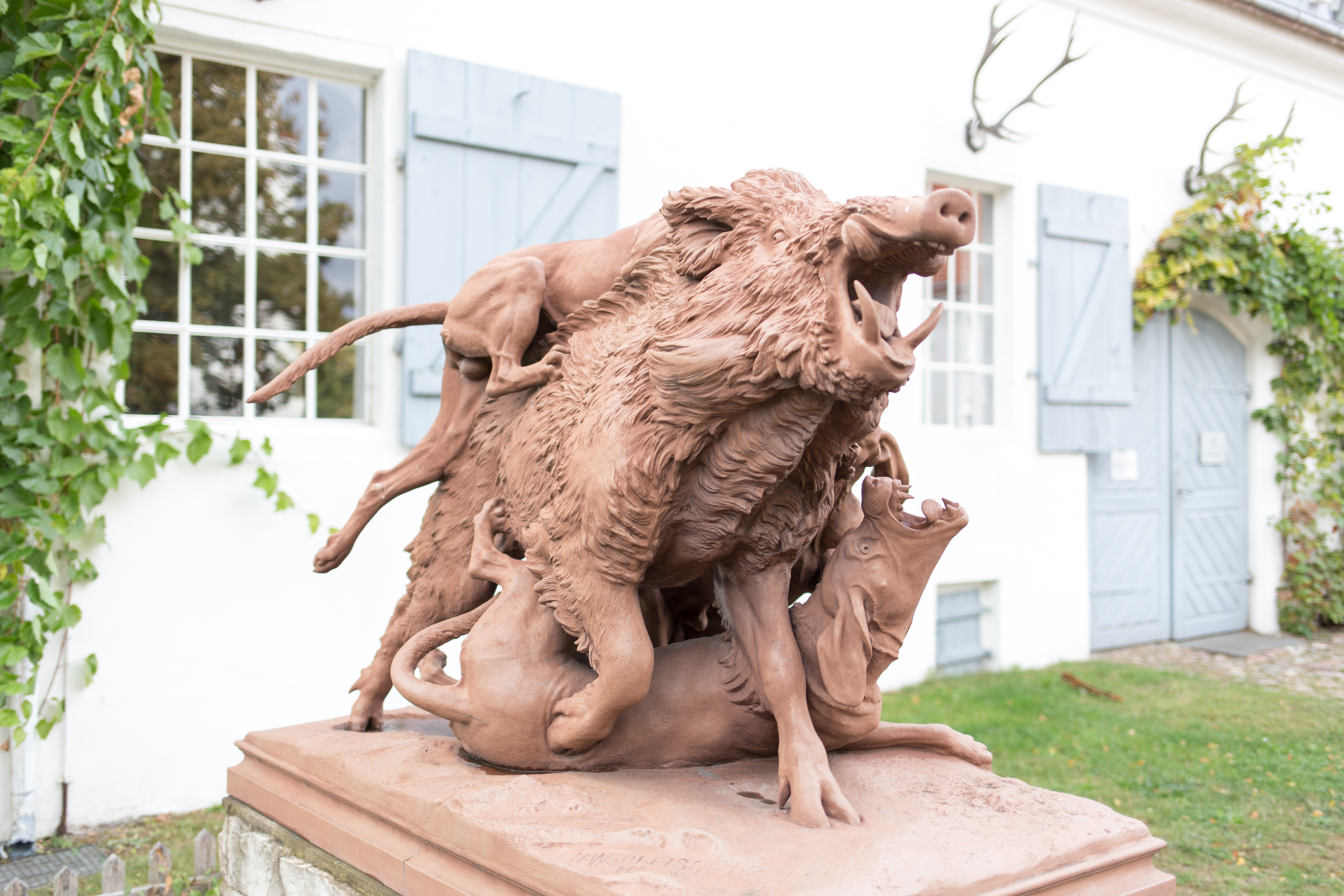
Wild boar hunting (Friedrich Wilhelm Wolff)

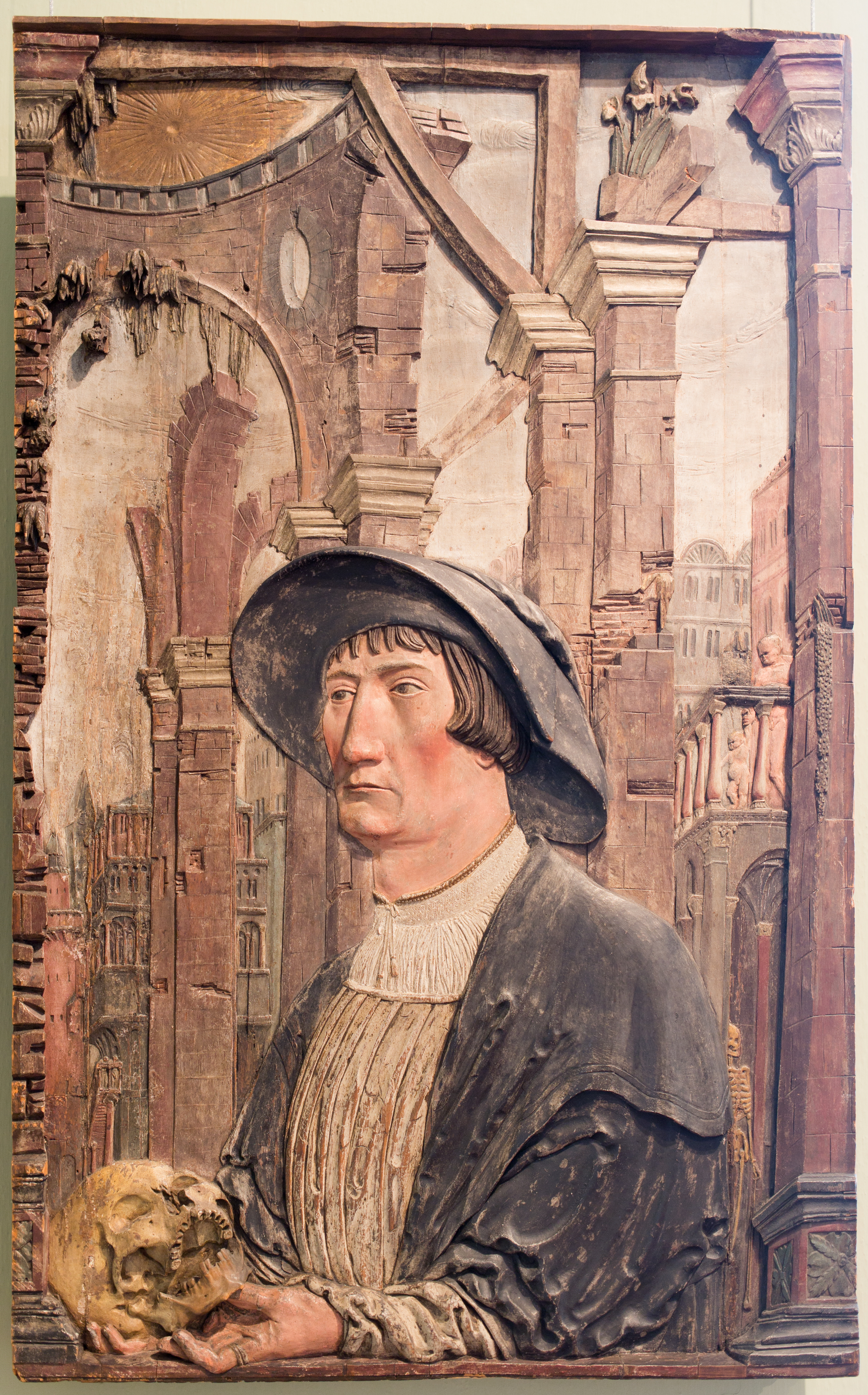
Tiedemann Giese, around 1525/1530

== Literature ==
- Friedrich Siegmar von Dohna-Schlobitten: Kurfürstliche Schlösser in der Mark Brandenburg. Teil I Grunewald, Oranienburg, Schönhausen. Karl Siegismund, Berlin, Germany 1890. (German)
- Georg Poensgen: Jagdschloss Grunewald. Verwaltung der Staatlichen Schlösser und Gärten, Berlin 1933; neu bearbeitete Auflage Deutscher Kunstverlag, Berlin, Germany 1949. (German)
- Maria Kapp: Die niederländischen und flämischen Gemälde des 17. Jahrhunderts im Jagdschloss Grunewald (From Berliner Schlössern 10). Verwaltung der Staatlichen Schlösser und Gärten, Berlin, Germany 1989. (German)
- Staatliche Schlösser und Gärten Berlin (Hrsg.): 450 Jahre Jagdschloß Grunewald 1542–1992. Berlin, Germany 1992 (German)
  - Band 1: Aufsätze (Inhaltsverzeichnis).
  - Band 2: Helmut Börsch-Supan: Aus der Gemäldesammlung.
  - Band 3: Winfried Baer: Aus der Jagdsammlung.
- Gert Streidt, Peter Feierabend: Preußen. Kunst und Architektur. Könemann, Köln, Germany 1999, ISBN 3-89508-424-7, Page. 64–66. (German)
- Handbuch der deutschen Kunstdenkmäler. Berlin, work from Sibylle Badstübner-Gröger, Michael Bollé, Ralph Paschke u. a., 2nd Publishing, Deutscher Kunstverlag, München/Berlin, Germany 2000, Page. 528–529. (German)
- Stiftung Preußische Schlösser und Gärten Berlin-Brandenburg: Jagdschloss Grunewald. Deutscher Kunstverlag, Berlin/München, Germany 2015, ISBN 978-3-422-04033-5. (German)
