= Longhorn cattle =

Longhorn cattle may refer to:

- English Longhorn, a traditional long-horned brown and white breed of cattle
- Texas Longhorn, a breed of cattle related to the cattle brought to Texas, California, and Florida by the Spanish
- Highland cattle, a Scottish breed called Highland longhorn
