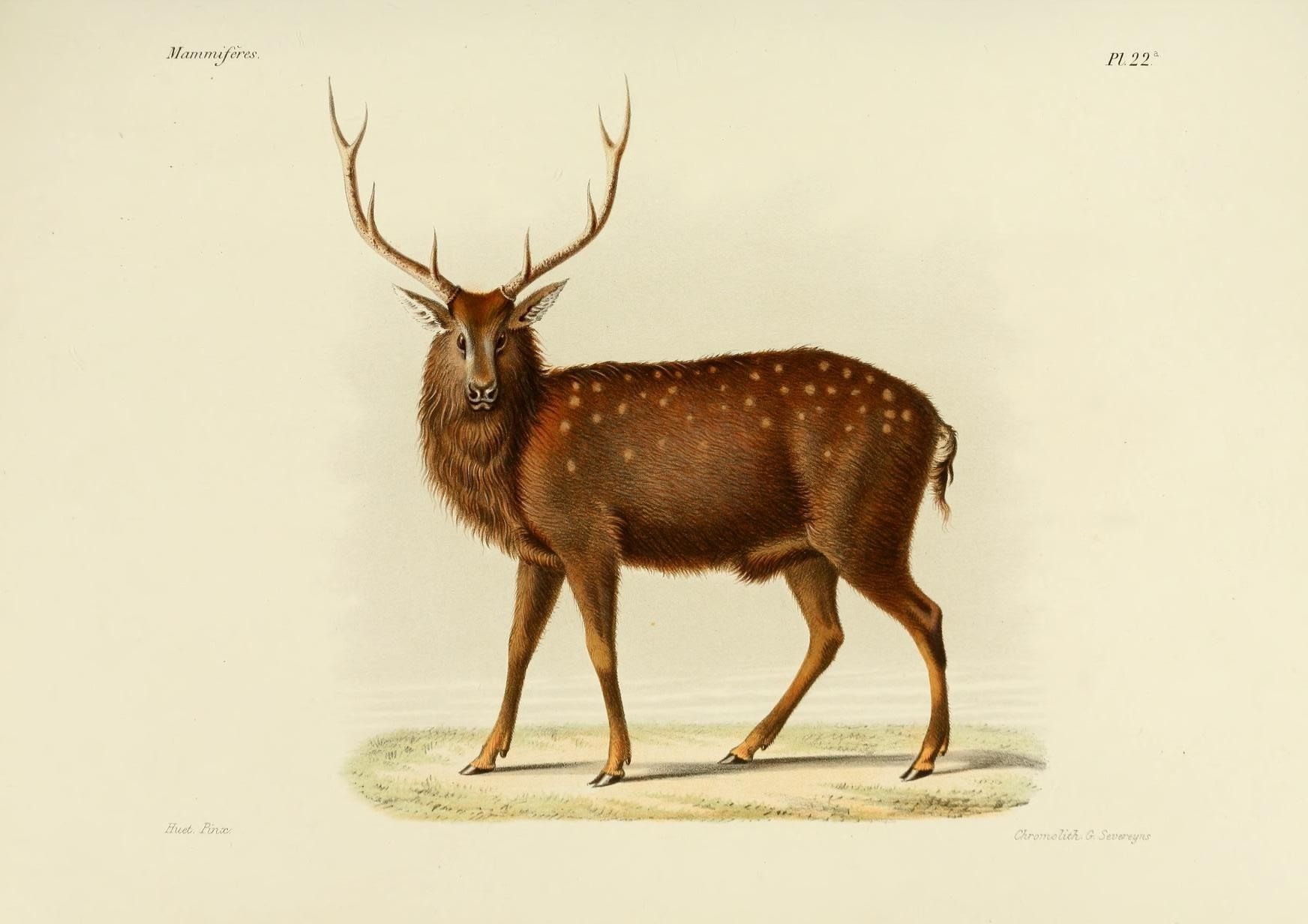

Scientific classification
- Domain: Eukaryota
- Kingdom: Animalia
- Phylum: Chordata
- Class: Mammalia
- Order: Artiodactyla
- Family: Cervidae
- Genus: Cervus
- Species: C. nippon
- Subspecies: C. n. mandarinus

Trinomial name
- Cervus nippon mandarinus Milne-Edwards, 1871

= North China sika deer =

Subspecies of deer

The North China sika deer or Mandarin sika deer (Cervus nippon mandarinus) is a large subspecies of sika deer with some of the most prominent spots of all subspecies, which is permanent throughout the year.

C. n. madarinus previously inhabited lowland forests of North China Plain and Northeast China Plain, but because of intensive habitat alterations the subspecies was endangered centuries ago, surviving only in remote areas of Northeast China and the Qing dynasty imperial hunting grounds in modern-day Weichang County, Chengde. Although no surveys have been conducted on the subspecies' status, there have been no wild sightings for many decades and it is reasonable to presume that it is extinct in the wild, and the lack of additional suitable habitats and government captive breeding efforts makes reintroduction impossible. However, captive C. n. mandarinus is fairly common in zoos and safari parks, and purebred C.n.mandarinus is a valuable deer farm breed in the East Asian velvet antler farming industry.
