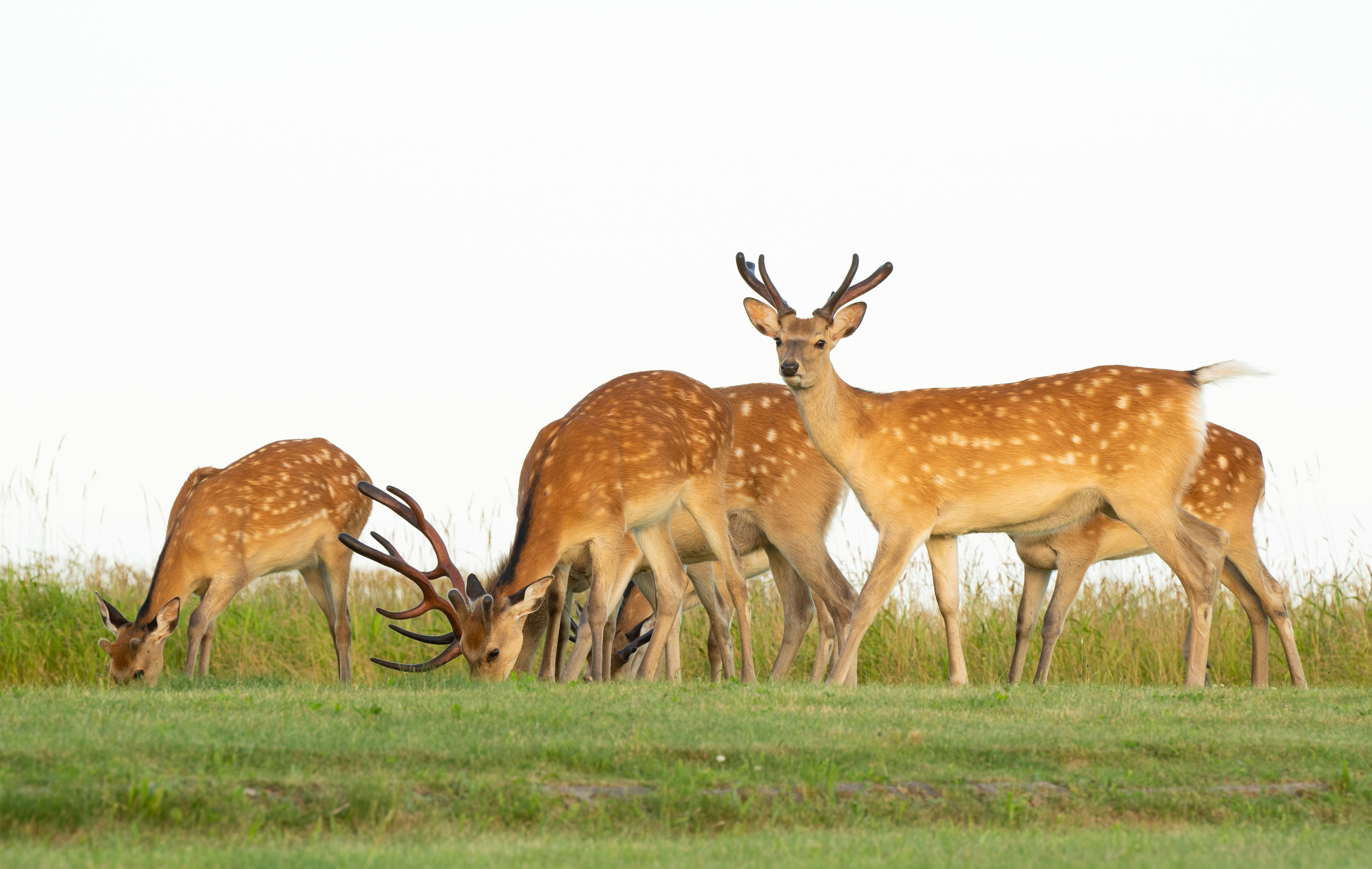
- A group of Yezo sika deer

Scientific classification
- Kingdom: Animalia
- Phylum: Chordata
- Class: Mammalia
- Infraclass: Placentalia
- Order: Artiodactyla
- Family: Cervidae
- Genus: Cervus
- Species: C. nippon
- Subspecies: C. n. yesoensis

Trinomial name
- Cervus nippon yesoensis Heude, 1884

= Yezo sika deer =

Subspecies of deer native to Japan

The Yezo sika deer (Cervus nippon yesoensis, Japanese: エゾシカ / 蝦夷鹿, romanized: yezoshika, Ainu: ユク yuk) is a subspecies of sika deer that inhabits the northern Japanese island of Hokkaido.

The Hokkaido sika are endemic, although it is not known whether they originated there or migrated from Honshū or areas further south. It is thought that they may have traveled across the Tsugaru Strait between the islands. Genetic study has shown that the separation of the sika population occurred less than half a million years ago. It is possible that northern sika deer may be more closely related to yezo sika deer than to other sika deer. The indigenous Ainu people of Hokkaido have hunted them for centuries and relied on them as a major food source.

== Description ==
The Hokkaido sika deer is one of the largest of all 14 sika deer subspecies and the largest of the subspecies native to Japan. A larger body could be an adaptation to Hokkaido's cold winters. Mature stags approach (and sometimes exceed) 200 kg (440 lb) in the fall. Measurements of 309 adult Hokkaido sika deer taken in 2001 resulted in the following weights: 102.8 to 151.0 kilograms (226.6 to 332.9 lb) in adult males and 68.0 to 99.8 kilograms (149.9 to 220.0 lb) in adult females. Weight showed distinct seasonal variation.

They sport the largest antlers of the sika deer, with lengths often over 89 centimetres (35 in); the longest recorded specimen had antlers measuring 112 centimetres (44 in). According to the USA-based Safari Club International (SCI) the Hokkaido sika deer produces the highest antler scores, although very few have been listed.

Sika deer moult twice every year: into their summer coat in May and June, and into their winter coat in September and October. Their summer coat is reddish-brown with numerous white spots, while their winter coat is grey-brown. Males shed their antlers in March and regrow them over the summer. They are fully formed by August and shed the velvet in September in time for the breeding season (rut) from late September to November.

== Behavior ==
Gestation is estimated to be 216 to 260 days and usually a single young (called fawn) is born from May to November.

== Habitat ==
Like all sika deer they favour forest edges. Additionally, on Hokkaido they can often be found in grasslands, meadows and wetland reed beds. They migrate seasonally to avoid deep snow. These migrations range from 7.2 to 101.7 kilometres (4.5 to 63.2 mi).

== Population ==
Yezo sika deer is the only ungulate species living on Hokkaido. Before the island was extensively settled by the Japanese from 1868 onwards, sika deer were widely distributed. Due to overhunting in the late 1800s and heavy snow in 1879 and 1881 the population massively decreased and only recovered from this genetic bottleneck in the 1950s. Since then there has been extensive population growth. This can be attributed to various reasons such as the extinction of one of their main predators, the Hokkaido wolf (Canis lupus hattai), in 1889, hunting regulations, and environmental changes due to human cultivation. Furthermore, climatic changes resulting in warmer winters with little snow have benefitted population explosion.

This overpopulation has led to widespread damages to agriculture and forestry as well as increased deer vehicle collisions, and has led to the extension of the hunting area to reduce the population size.

== Gallery ==
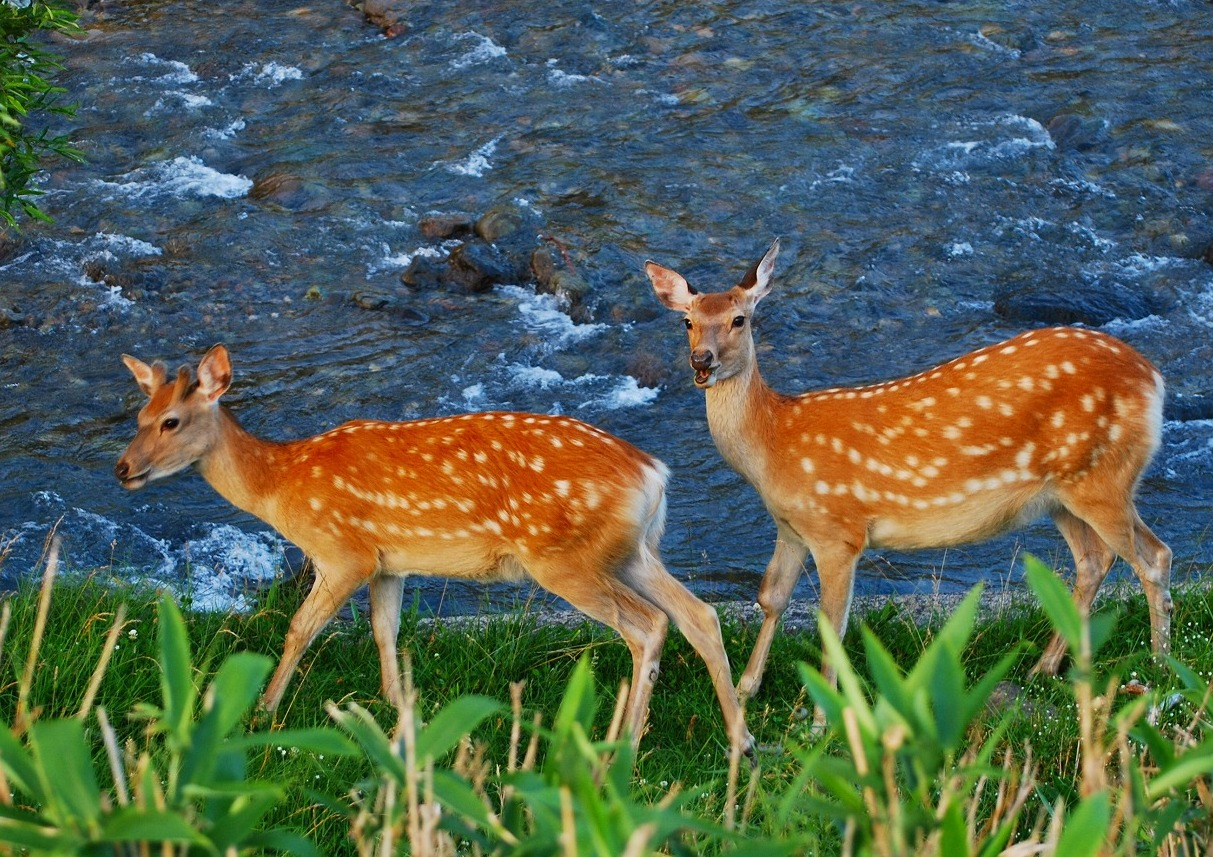
In summer coat

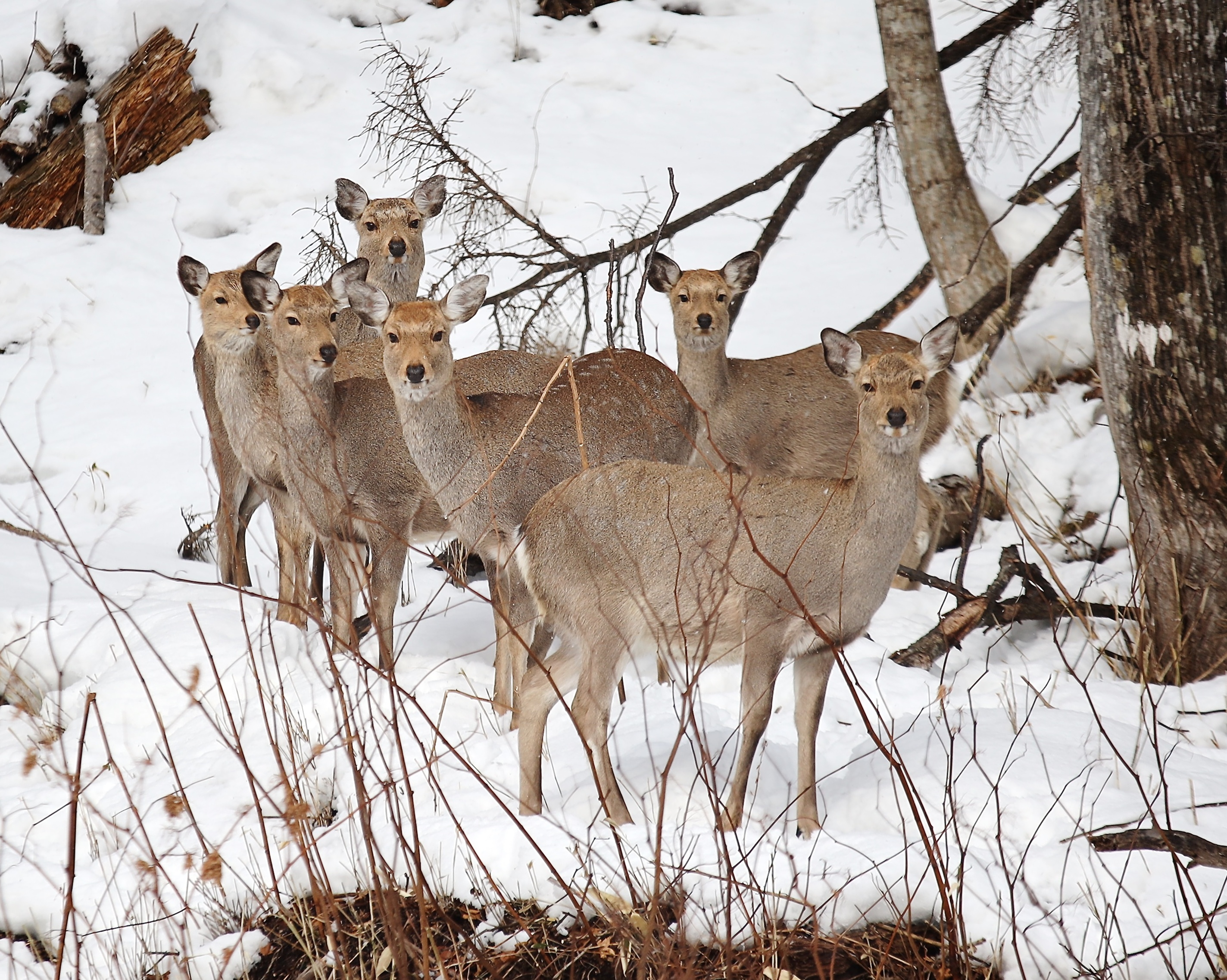
Female deer in winter coat

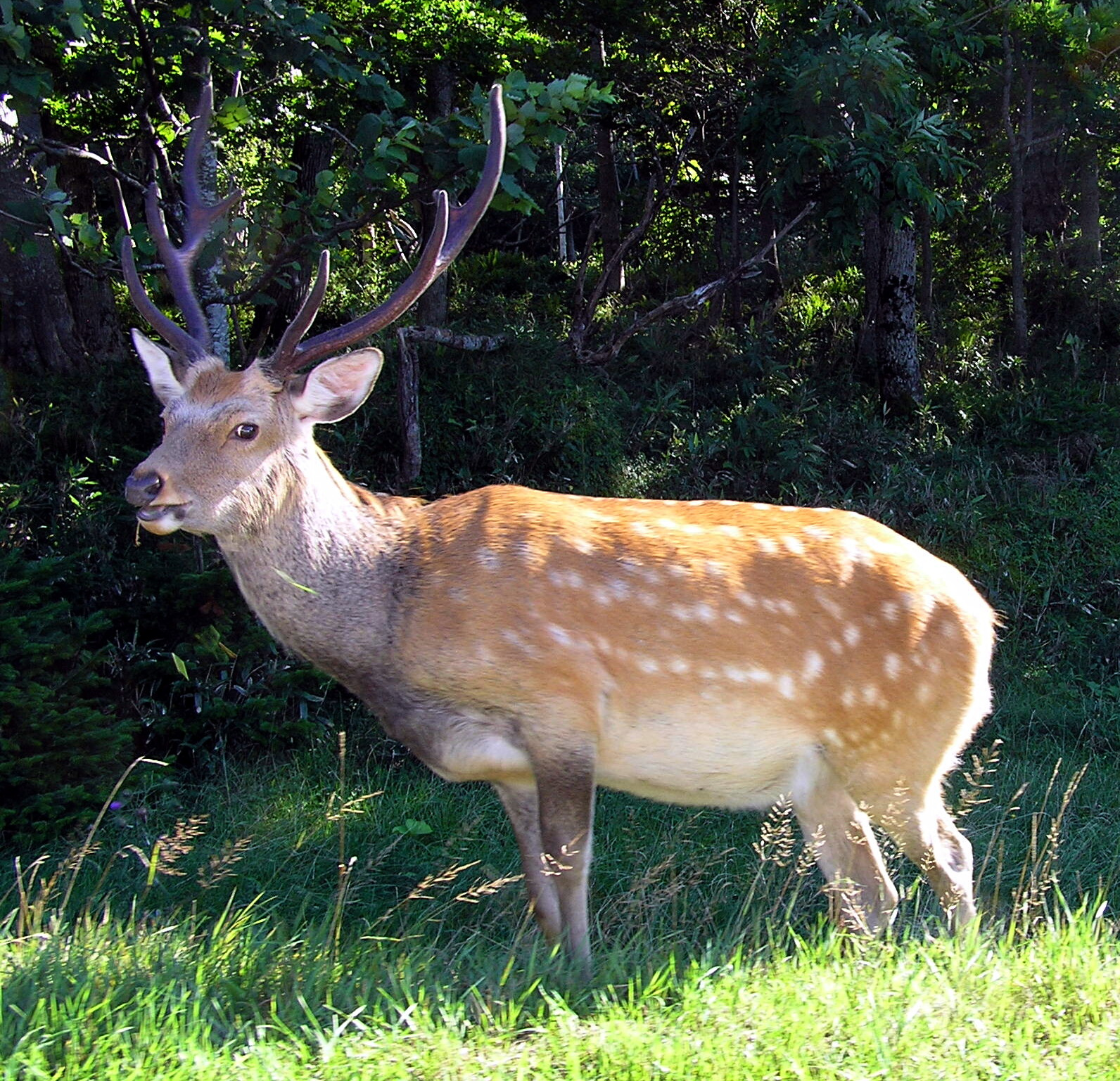
Adult male

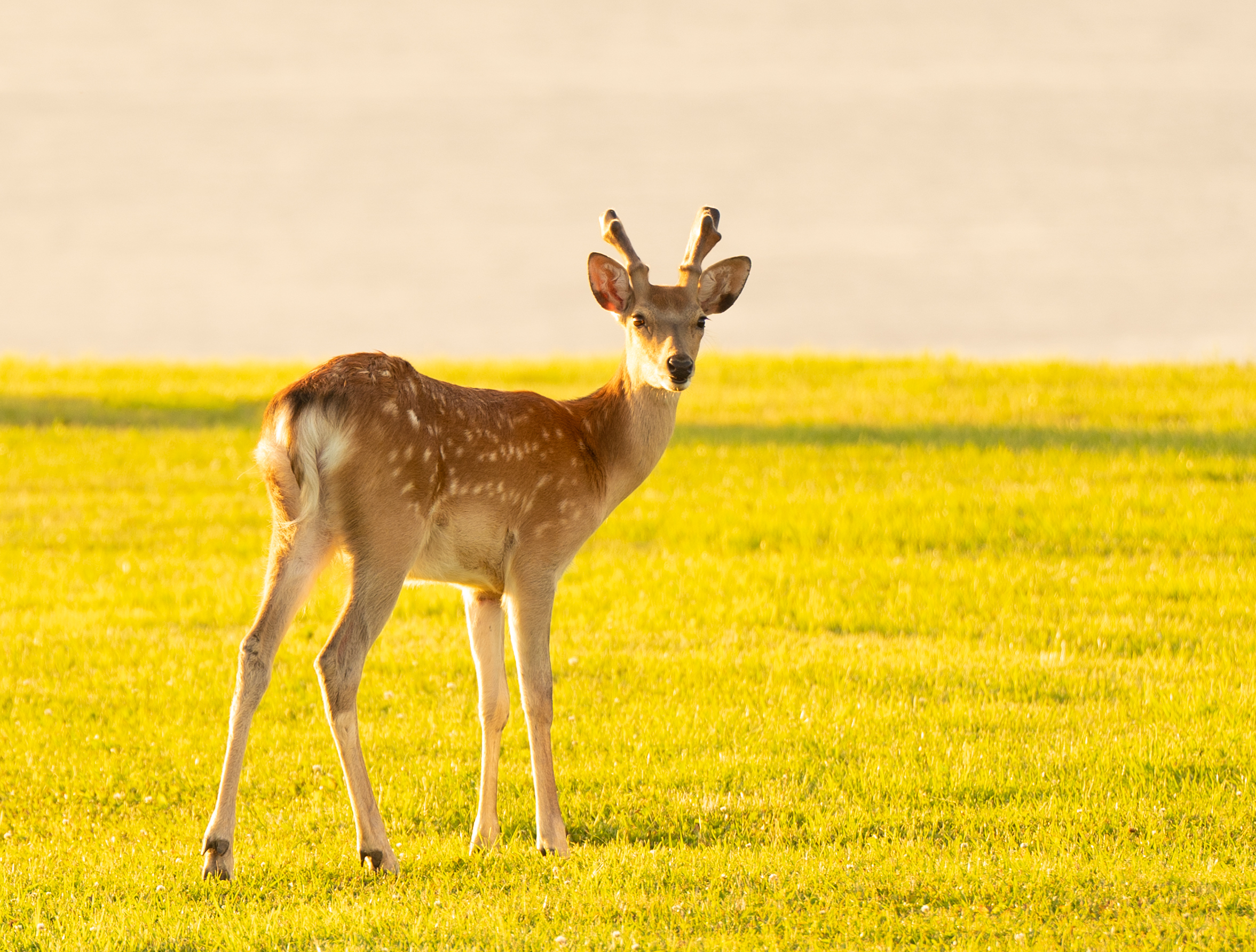
Young male with antlers in velvet

Yezo sika deer grazing in December near Kushiro, 2021

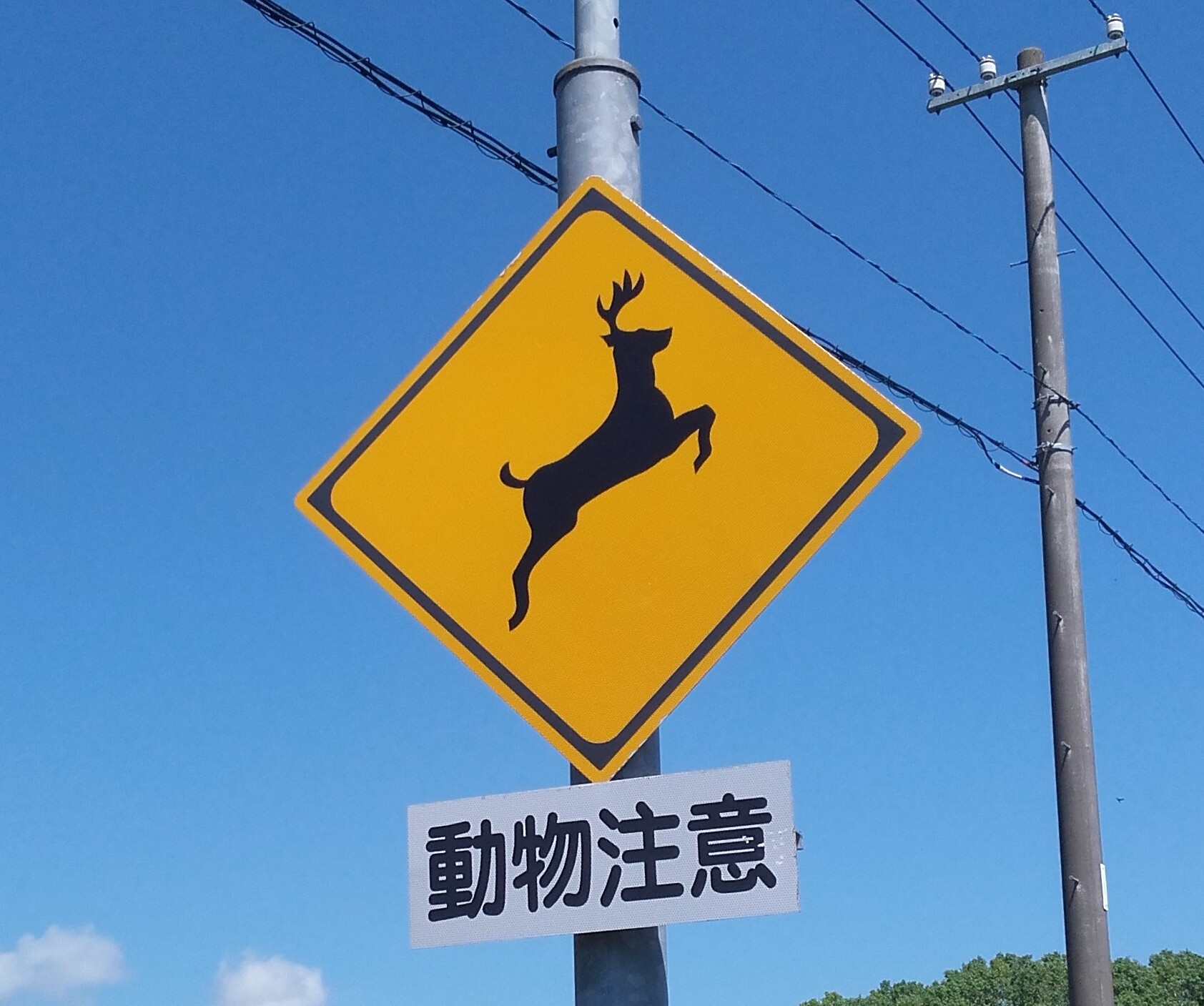
Road warning sign
