= Deer farm =

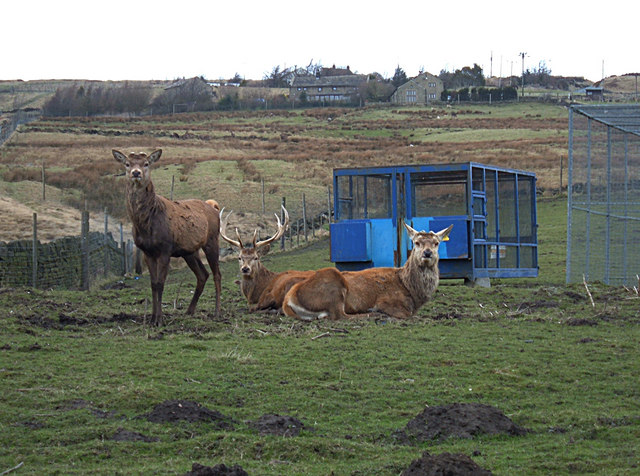
Venison Farming – geograph.org.uk

A deer farm (technically a ranch) is a fenced facility, typically a piece of pasture suitable for grazing, that is used to breed and raise deer species (such as elk, moose, reindeer, sika deer or especially white-tailed deer) as livestock.

Farm-raised deer are typically harvested for commercially valuable products, such as meat (venison), hide (buckskin), fur, antlers (particularly velvet antlers), blood and even penis, the latter three often used as adaptogenic ingredients in traditional Chinese medicine. As of 2006, New Zealand was the largest supplier of farm-raised venison with approximately 3,500 intensive deer farms and an estimated stock of 1.7 million deer.

== Deer farming in New Zealand ==
Large-scale commercial farming of deer originated in New Zealand, and that country still has the world's most advanced deer farming industry.

Deer are not native to New Zealand. The first deer were brought to the country from England and Scotland for sport hunting in the mid- to late 19th century, and released mainly in the Southern Alps and surrounding foothills. The environment in New Zealand, with no natural predators and comparable competitors, proved ideal for deer, and the uncontrolled introduced populations grew to high numbers. By the middle of the 20th century, these feral deer were regarded as invasive pests because of their impact on the native forests. From the 1950s, deer cullers were employed by the New Zealand Government to keep the feral numbers in check.

The export of venison from wild deer started in the 1960s, turning a pest into an export earner. Industry pioneers saw an opportunity to build on this base, and in the early 1970s started capturing live deer from the wild and farming them. A new industry was born and rapidly spread throughout New Zealand, and later to the United States and Canada.

== Fears of chronic wasting disease ==
Since chronic wasting disease (CWD), a transmissible spongiform encephalopathy similar to mad cow disease, can pass from wild populations of deer to farmed deer, there has been some fear of contamination of the food supply.

Recently, as of 2014, cases of CWD have been found in both farmed and wild cervids in the US and western Canada.

New Zealand is free of CWD. The New Zealand Ministry for Primary Industries undertakes an extensive testing programme which would identify the disease if it occurred in the national deer herd.

== See also ==
- Kostroma Moose Farm
- Deer hunting
- Elk farming
- Reindeer herding
