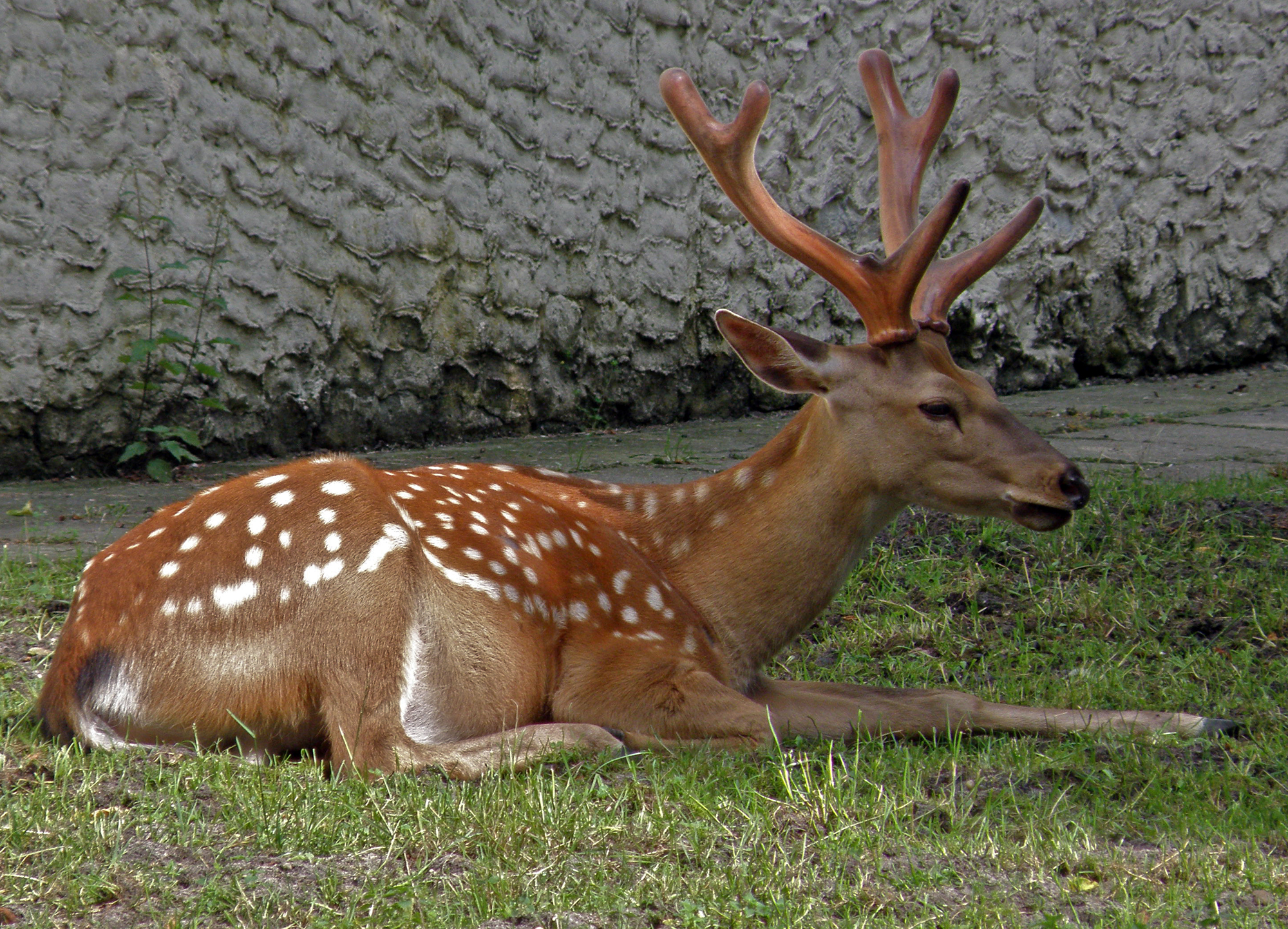
- At Warsaw Zoo, Poland

Scientific classification
- Kingdom: Animalia
- Phylum: Chordata
- Class: Mammalia
- Order: Artiodactyla
- Family: Cervidae
- Genus: Cervus
- Species: C. nippon
- Subspecies: C. n. mantchuricus

Trinomial name
- Cervus nippon mantchuricus R. Swinhoe, 1864

= Manchurian sika deer =

Subspecies of deer

The Manchurian sika deer or Dybowski's sika deer (Cervus nippon mantchuricus or Cervus nippon dybowskii ) is the largest of the 14 subspecies of sika deer. It was first described by Robert Swinhoe in 1864.

== Geographic range ==
The Manchurian sika deer was formerly found in Northeast China (Manchuria), Korea and the Russian Far East. Today it is likely to be extinct in China and Korea, but about 9,000 individuals still live in the sparsely populated areas of Primorsky Krai in Russia. There are also many captive breeding programs in Europe for meat and recreational hunting.

== Description ==
Body length is 155 cm (61 in), and the tail is up to 20 cm (7.9 in) long. The height at the withers is 75–110 cm (30–43 in). Females weigh up to 80–90 kg (180–200 lb) and bulls up to 110–160 kg (240–350 lb).

== Reproduction ==
Pregnancy lasts up to 221 days, and one young is born.

== Etymology ==
Both the subspecific name, dybowskii, and the common name, Dybowski's sika deer, are in honor of Polish naturalist Benedykt Dybowski, who discovered this deer when he was exploring Siberia after completing his katorga term.

== Bibliography ==
- Apollonio, Marco; Andersen, Reidar; Putman, Rory. 2010. European Ungulates and Their Management in the 21st Century. Cambridge, New York: Cambridge University Press. ISBN 978-0-521-76061-4. p. 248.
