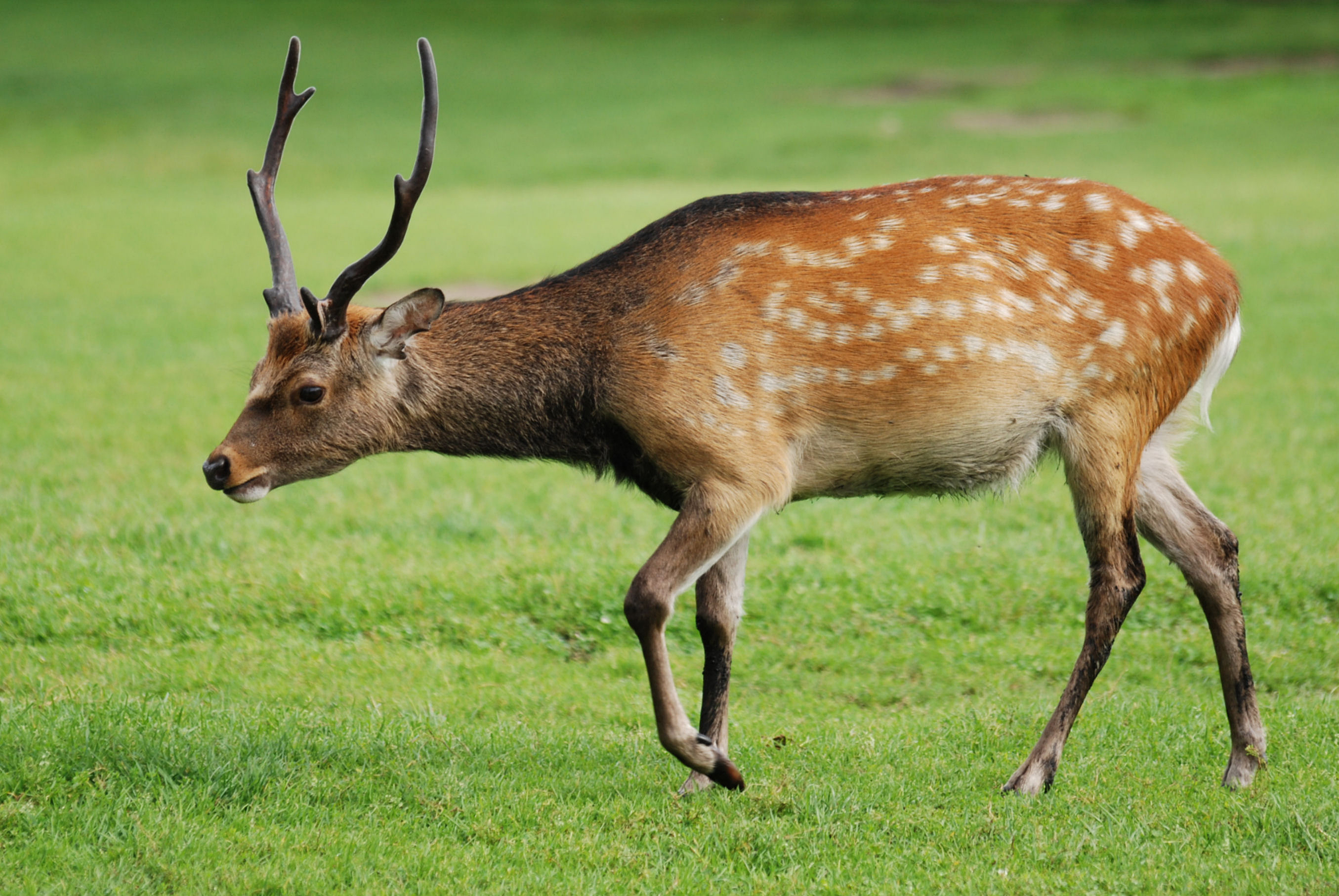
- Male (stag) in Kadzidłowo, Poland
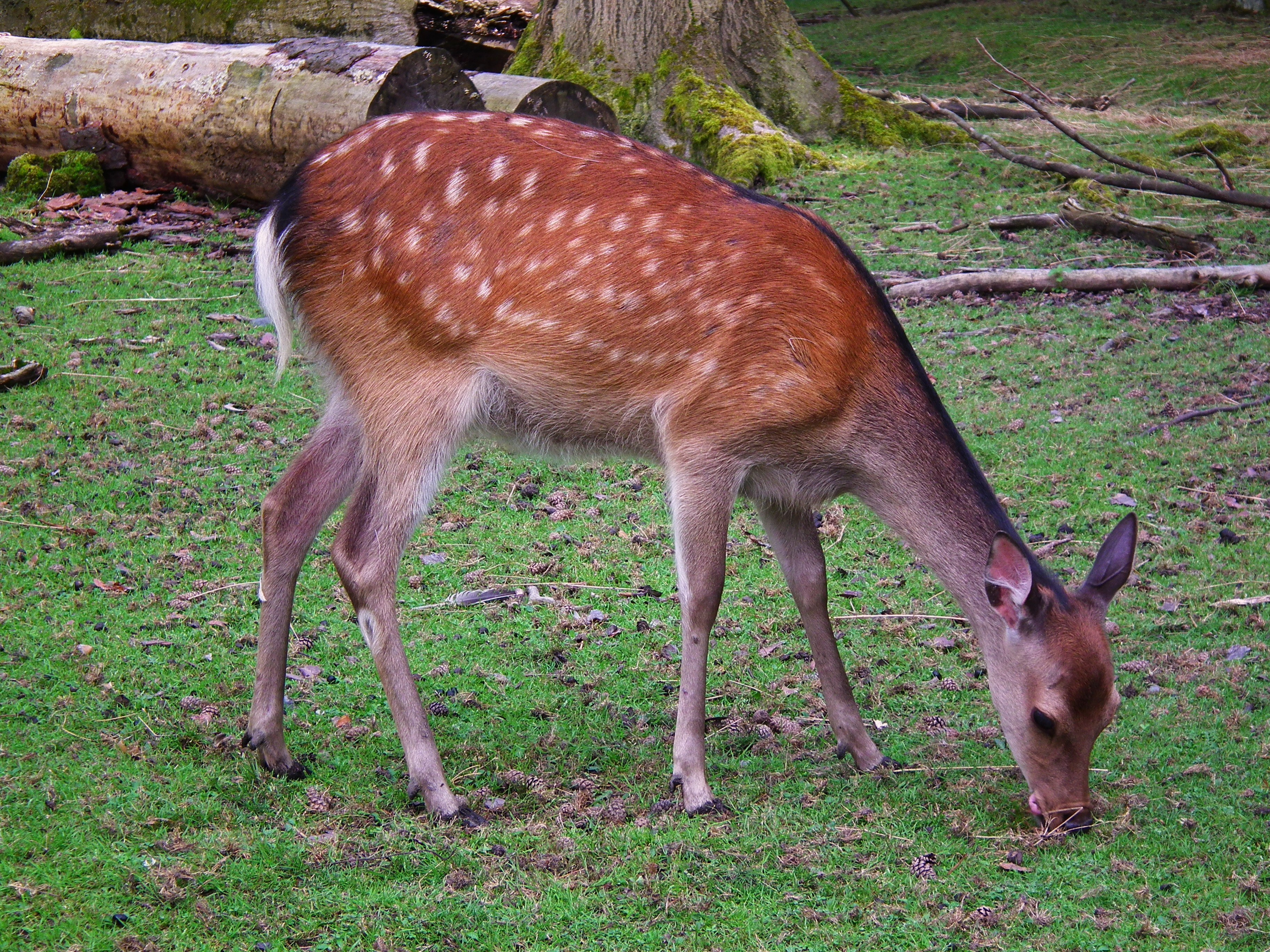
- Female (hind) in the Wildpark Alte Fasanerie, Hanau, Germany Male sika breeding calls, UK

Conservation status
- Least Concern (IUCN 3.1)

Scientific classification
- Kingdom: Animalia
- Phylum: Chordata
- Class: Mammalia
- Order: Artiodactyla
- Family: Cervidae
- Genus: Cervus
- Species: C. nippon

Binomial name
- Cervus nippon Temminck, 1838

Subspecies
- See text
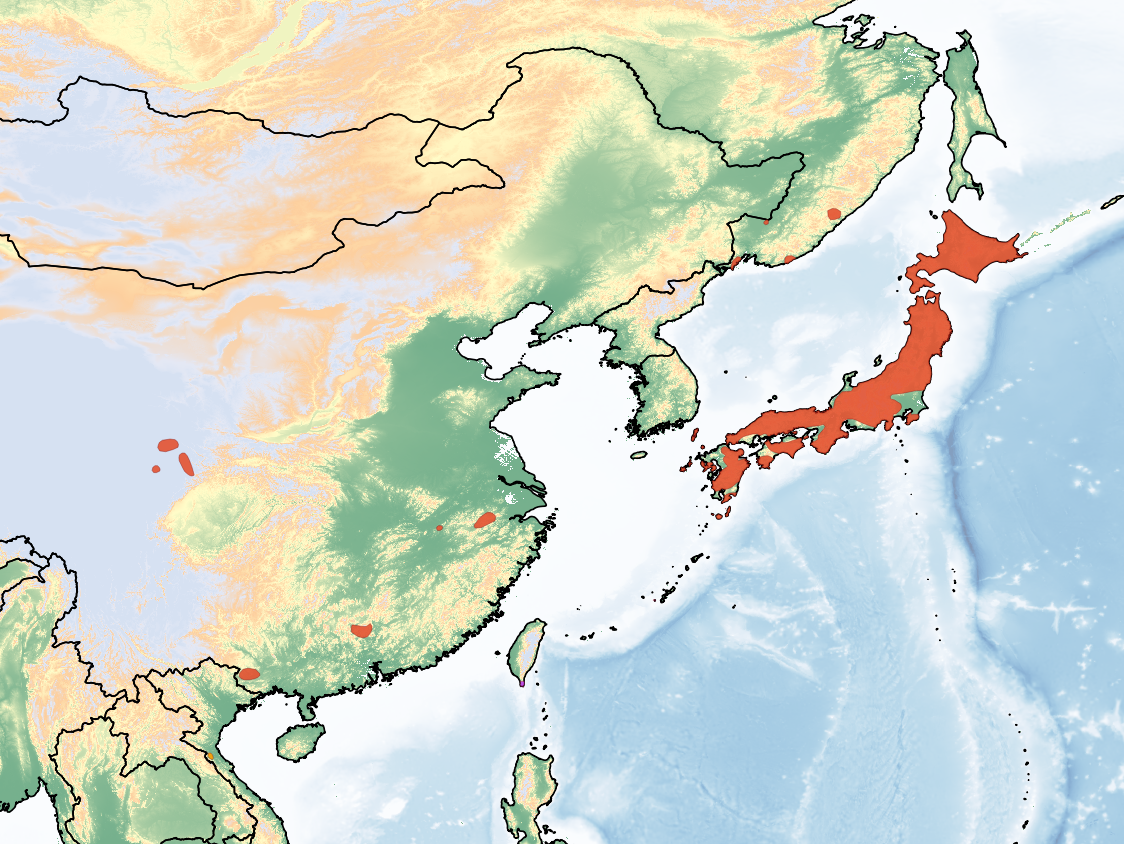

= Sika deer =

Species of deer native to much of East Asia

The sika deer (Cervus nippon), also known as the northern spotted deer or the Japanese deer, is a species of deer native to much of East Asia and introduced to other parts of the world. Previously found from northern Vietnam in the south to the Russian Far East in the north, it was overhunted to the brink of extinction in the 19th century. Protection laws were enacted in the mid-20th century, leading to a rapid recovery of their population from the 1950s to the 1980s.

== Etymology ==
The name "sika deer" comes from shika (鹿), the Japanese word for "deer", and in Japan, the species is known as the nihonjika (ニホンジカ (日本鹿), "Japan deer"). In Chinese, it is known as Chinese: 梅花鹿; pinyin: méihuālù, "plum blossom deer", referring to the white fur spots on the deer's back resembling plum blossoms.

== Taxonomy ==
The sika deer is a member of the genus Cervus, a group of deer also known as the "true" deer, within the larger deer family, Cervidae. Formerly, sika were grouped together in this genus with nine other diverse species; these animals have since been found to be genetically different, and reclassified elsewhere under different genera. Currently, deer species within the genus Cervus are the sika, the red deer (C. elaphus) of Eurasia and North Africa (introduced in Argentina, Australia, New Zealand), and the wapiti, or elk (C. canadensis), of North America, Siberia, and north-central Asia.

DNA evidence indicates that the species formerly placed under Cervus are not as closely related as once thought, resulting in the creation of several new genera. The ancestor of all Cervus species probably originated in Central Asia and possibly resembled the sika deer. Members of this genus can crossbreed and produce hybrids in areas where they coexist. This includes sika and wapiti; in the Scottish Highlands, the interbreeding of native Scottish red deer with introduced sika has been deemed a serious threat to the gene pool of the Scottish deer. By comparison, though, an invasive sika deer in the United States cannot reproduce with a North American white-tailed, mule, or black-tailed deer, all of which are placed in a separate genus, Odocoileus.

=== Subspecies ===
Serious genetic pollution has occurred in many populations, especially in China, so the status of many subspecies remains unclear. The status of C. n. hortulorum is particularly uncertain and might in fact be of mixed origin, hence it is not listed here.

- C. n. aplodontus, northern Honshu
- C. n. grassianus, Shanxi, China
- C. n. keramae, Kerama Islands of the Ryukyu Islands, Japan
- C. n. kopschi, southern China
- C. n. mandarinus, northern and northeastern China
- C. n. mantchuricus, northeastern China, Korea, and Russian Far East
- C. n. nippon (type species), southern Honshu, Shikoku, and Kyushu
- C. n. pseudaxis, northern Vietnam
- C. n. pulchellus, Tsushima Island
- C. n. sichuanicus, western China
- †C. n. sintikuensis, Taiwan
- C. n. soloensis, Southern Philippines (anciently introduced to Jolo island; of unknown subspecies origin, probably extinct)
- C. n. taiouanus, Taiwan
- C. n. yakushimae, Yakushima, Japan
- C. n. yesoensis, Hokkaido, Japan

== Description ==
The sika deer is one of the few deer species that does not lose its spots upon reaching maturity. Spot patterns vary with region. The mainland subspecies have larger and more obvious spots, in contrast to the Taiwanese and Japanese subspecies, whose spots are nearly invisible. Many introduced populations are from Japan, so they also lack significant spots.

The color of the pelage ranges from mahogany to black, and white individuals are also known. During winter, the coat becomes darker and shaggier and the spots less prominent, and a mane forms on the back of the males' necks. They are medium-sized herbivores, though they show notable size variation across their several subspecies and considerable sexual dimorphism, with males invariably much larger than females. They can vary from 50 to 110 cm (20 to 45 in) tall at the shoulder and from 95 to 180 cm (35 to 70 in) in head-and-body length. The tail measures about 7.5–13 cm (3–5 in) long.

The largest subspecies is the Manchurian sika deer (C. n. mantchuricus), in which males commonly weigh about 68–109 kg (150–240 lb) and females weigh 45–50 kg (100–110 lb), with large stags scaling up to 160 kg (350 lb), although Yezo sika deer bulls weighing up to 170 or 200 kg (370 or 440 lb) have been recorded. On the other end of the size spectrum, in the Japanese sika deer (C. n. nippon), males weigh 40–70 kg (90–150 lb) and females weigh 30–40 kg (70–90 lb). All sikas are compact and dainty-legged, with short, trim, wedge-shaped heads and a boisterous disposition. When alarmed, they often display a distinctive flared rump, much like the American elk.

Sika stags have stout, upright antlers with an extra buttress up from the brow tine and a very thick wall. A forward-facing intermediate tine breaks the line to the top, which is usually forked. Occasionally, sika antlers develop some palmation (flat areas). Females carry a pair of distinctive black bumps on the forehead. Antlers can range from 28 to 45 cm (11 to 17 1/2 in) to more than 80 cm (30 in), depending on the subspecies. Stags also have distinctive manes during their mating period (rut).

These deer have well-developed metatarsal and preorbital glands. The volatile components of these glands were examined from a free-ranging female. The metatarsal gland contained 35 compounds: long-chain carboxylic acids, straight-chain aldehydes, long-chain alcohols, a ketone, and cholesterol. The components of the preorbital gland were C14 through C18 straight and branched-chain fatty acids.

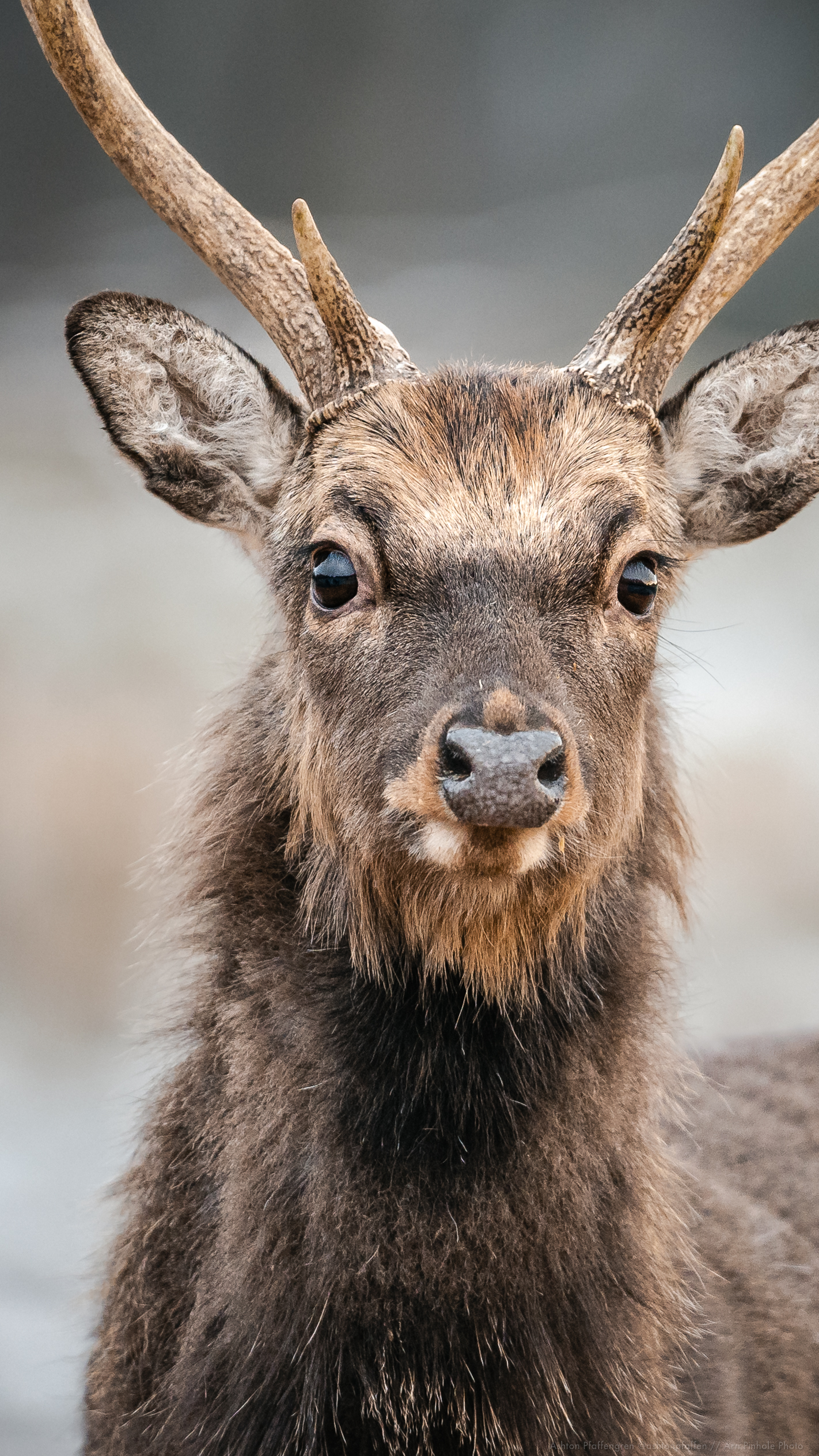
Sika deer (stag) at Jægersborg Dyrehave in Denmark

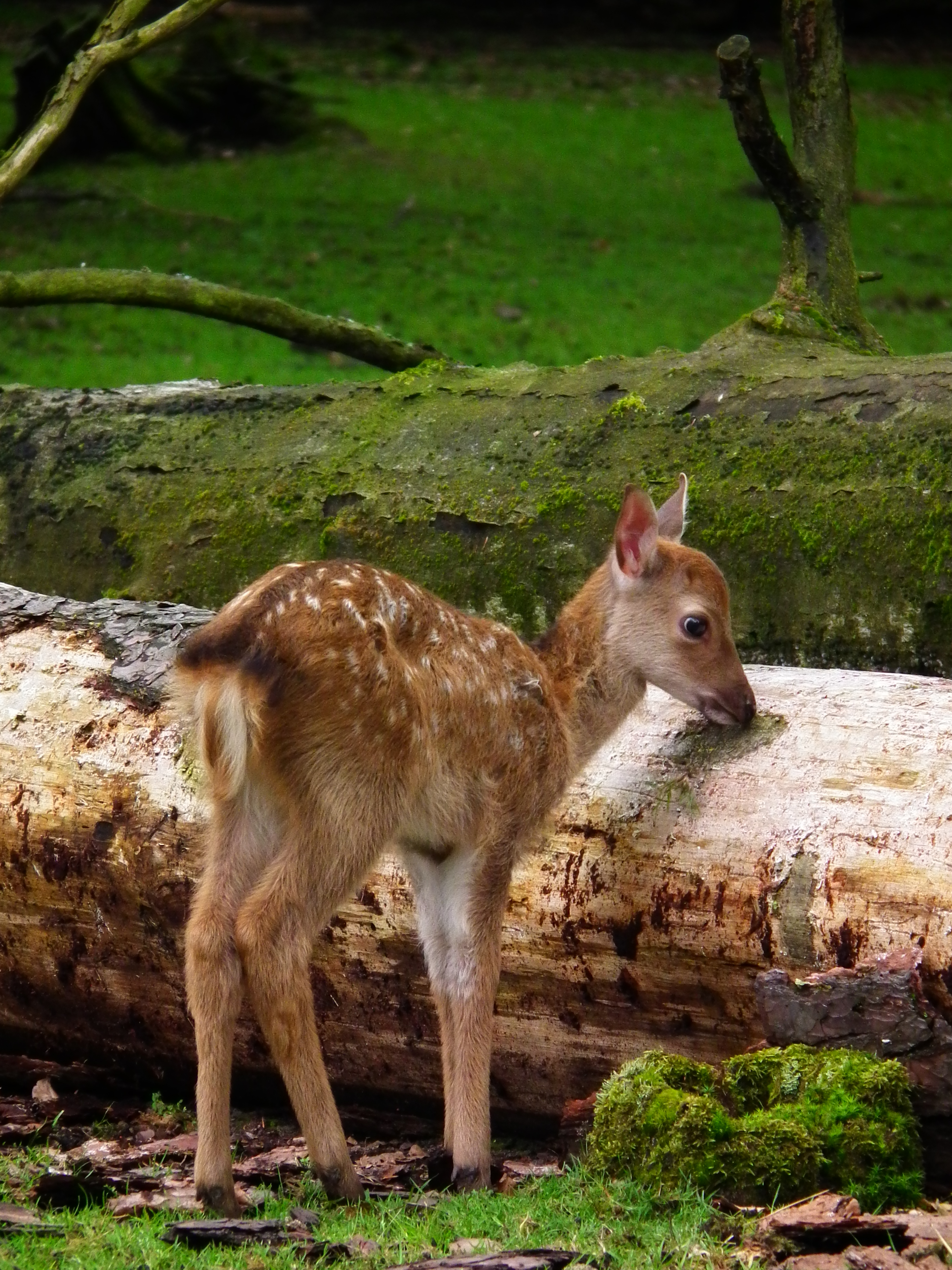
Fawn at the Wildpark Alte Fasanerie in Klein-Auheim

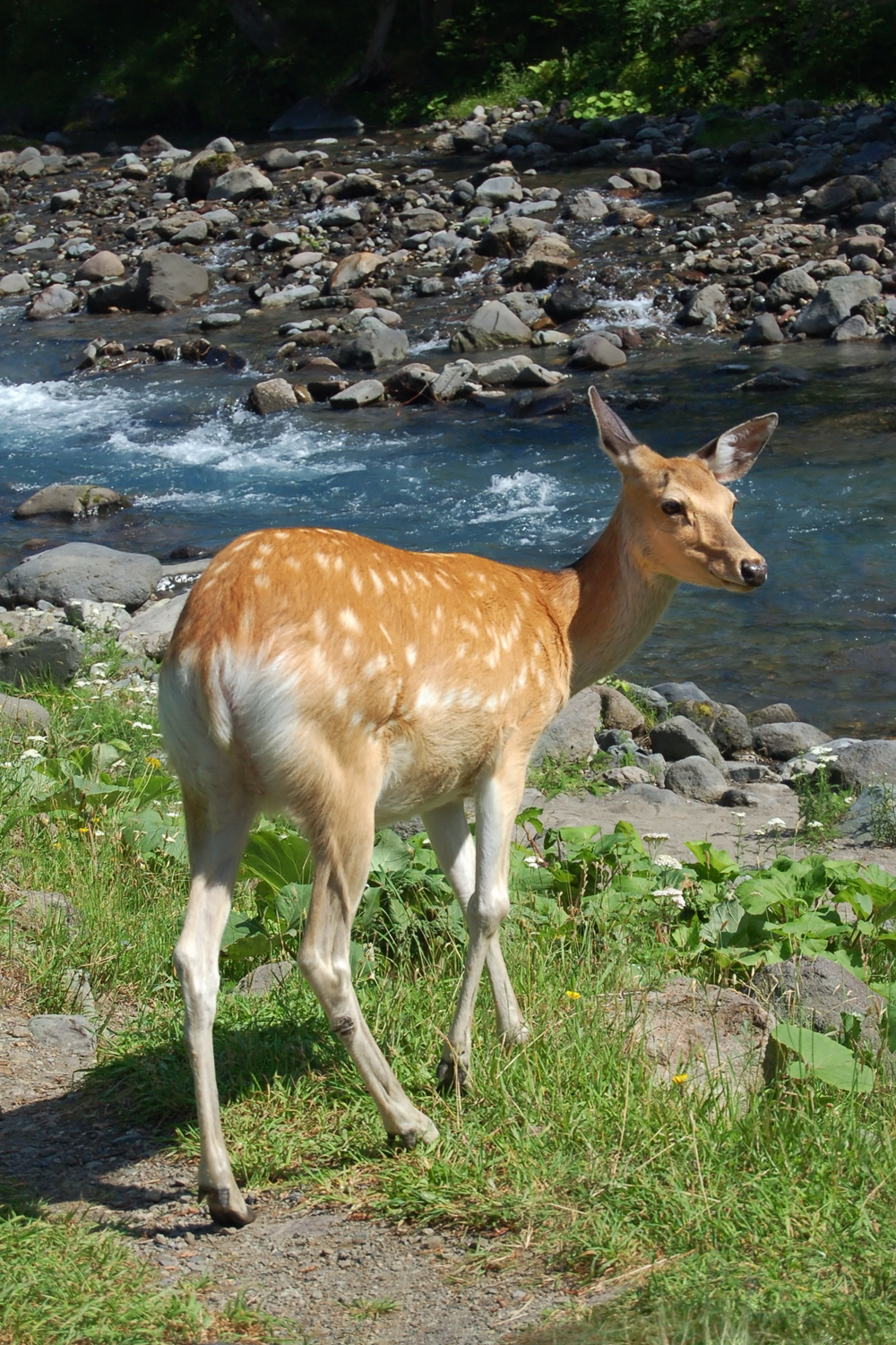
In Shiretoko Peninsula, Hokkaido, Japan

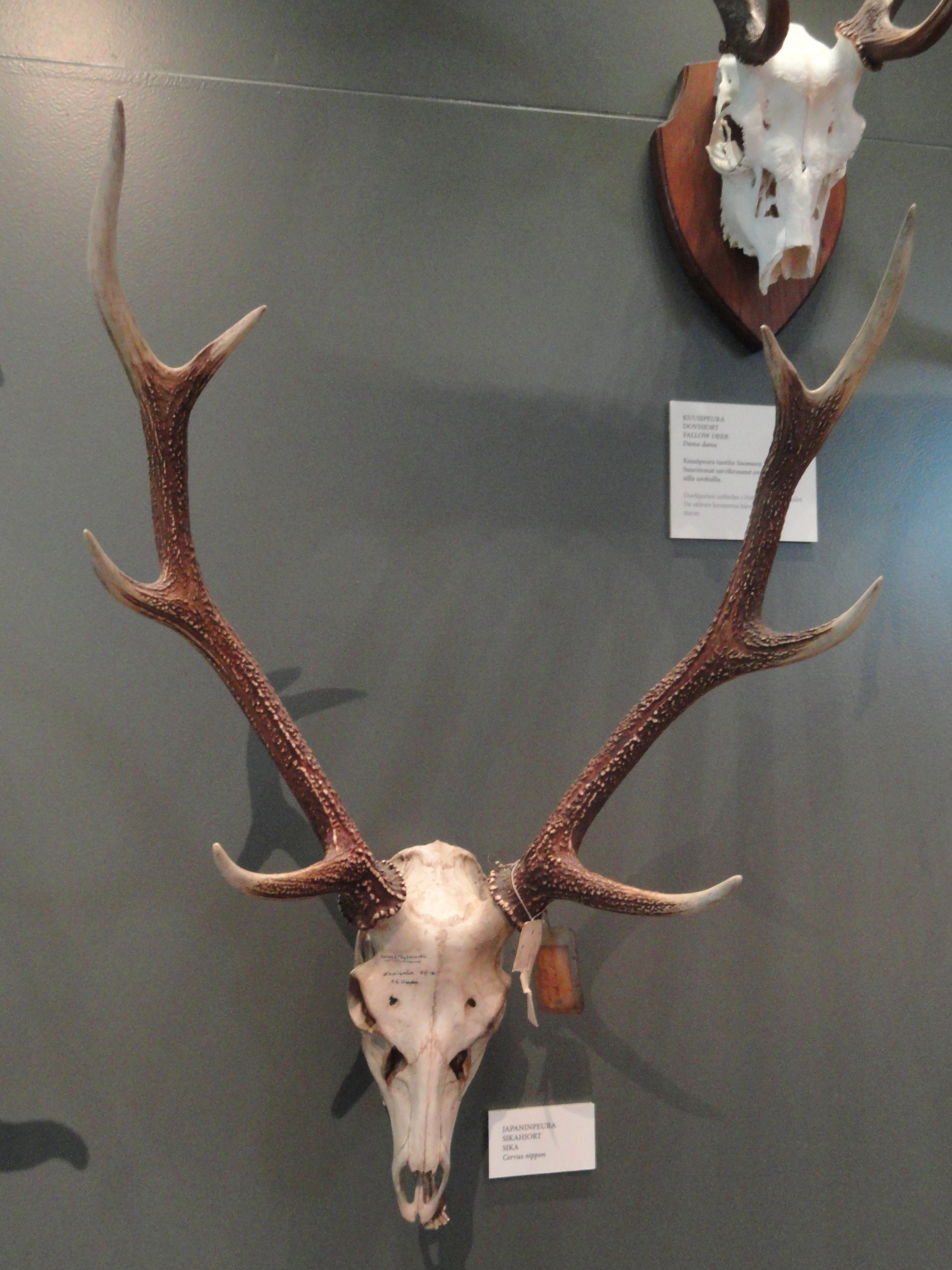
The skull of stag displayed in the Finnish Museum of Natural History, Helsinki, Finland

Sika deer standing up

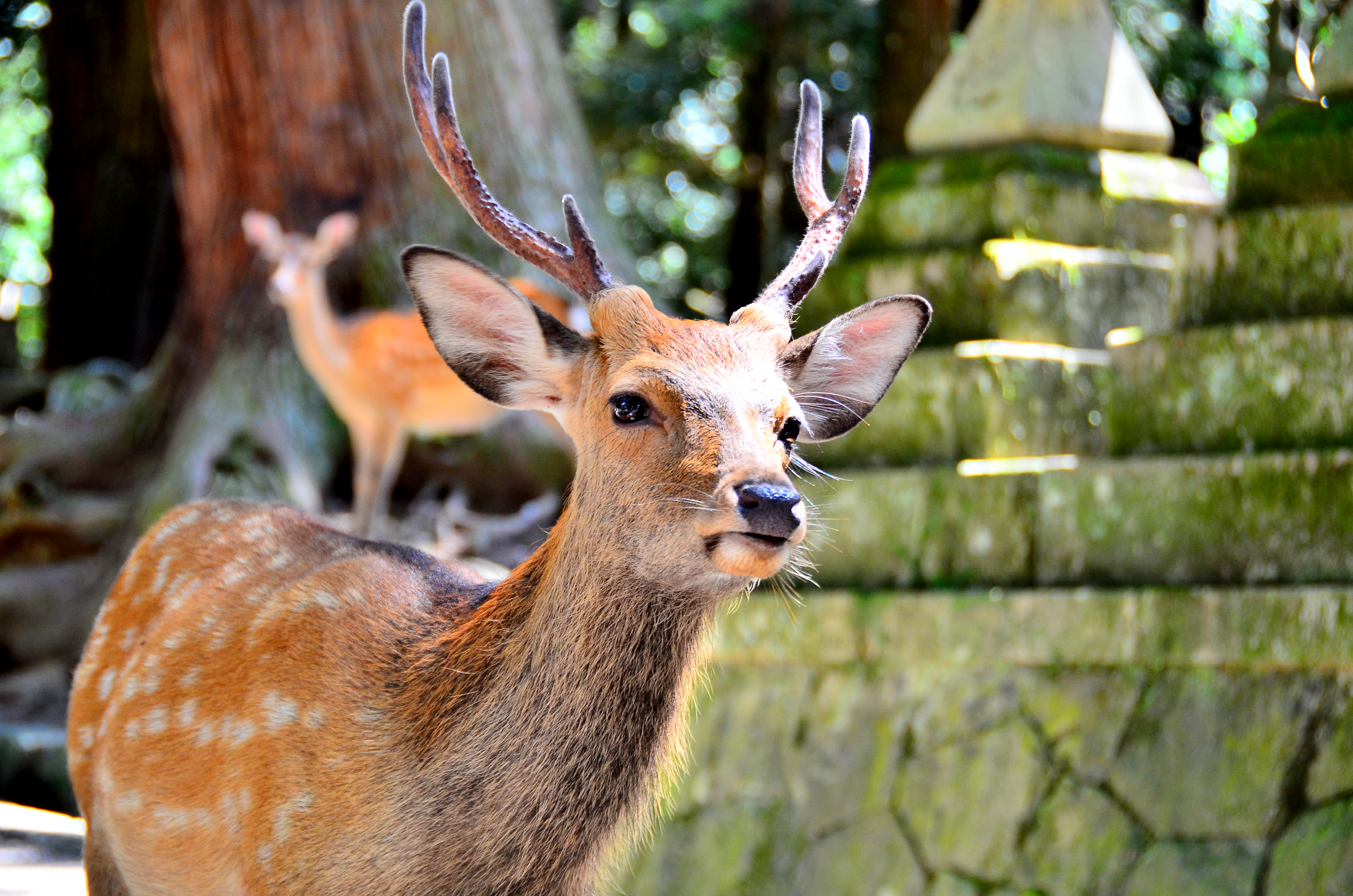
Young male in Nara

== Behavior ==
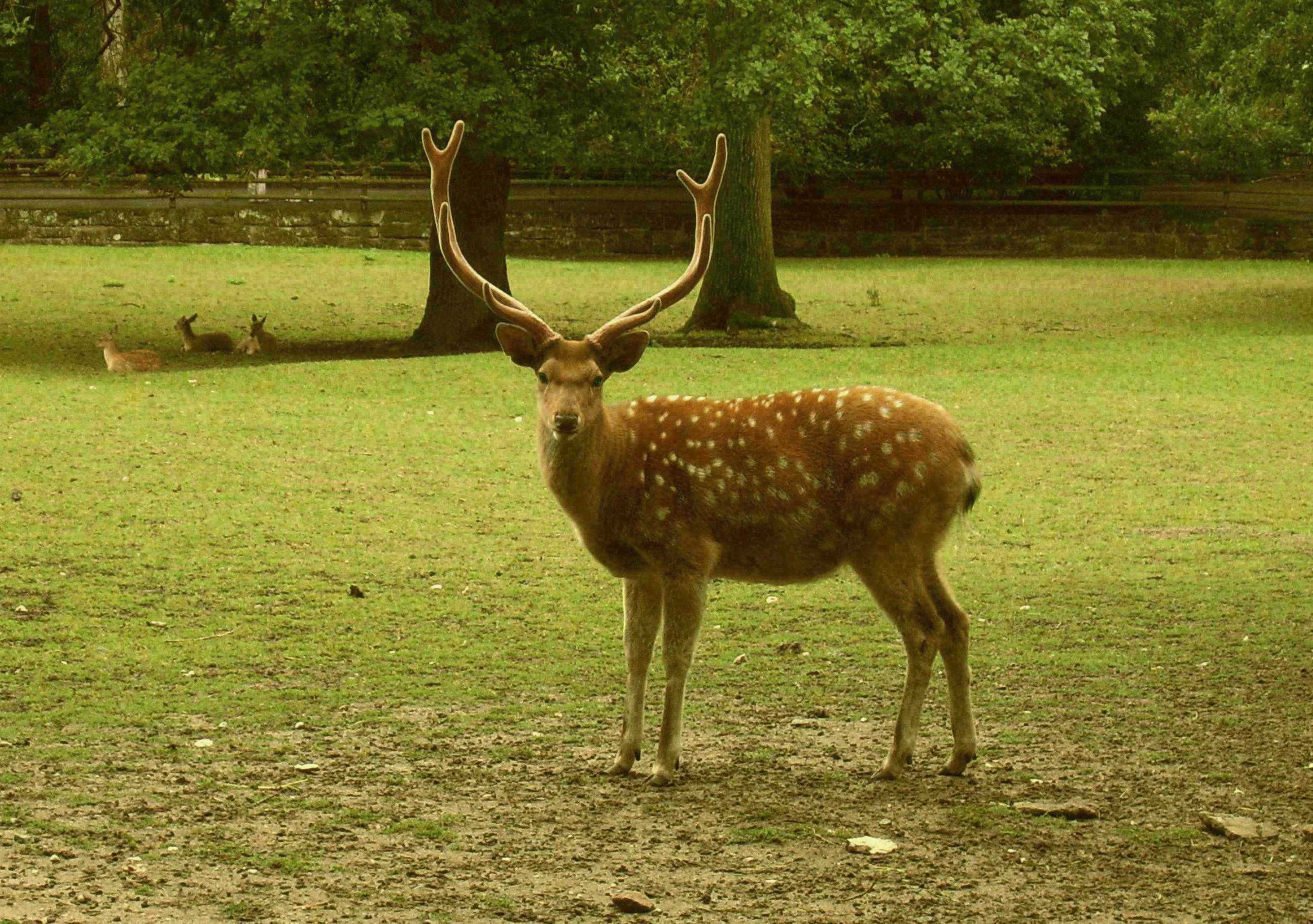
Manchurian sika deer

Male calling, recorded at Wareham, Dorset, England, October 1964

Sika deer can be active throughout the day, though in areas with heavy human disturbance, they tend to be nocturnal. Seasonal migration is known to occur in mountainous areas, such as Japan, with winter ranges being up to 700 m (2,300 ft) lower in elevation than summer ranges.

Lifestyles vary between individuals, with some occurring alone, while others are found in single-sex groups. Large herds gather in autumn and winter. Males spend most years alone, occasionally forming herds together. Females with fawns only form herds during birthing season. The sika deer is a highly vocal species, with over 10 individual sounds, ranging from soft whistles to loud screams.

Sika males are territorial and keep harems of females during their rut, which peaks from early September through November, but may last well into the winter. Territory size varies with habitat type and size of the buck; strong, prime bucks may hold up to 2 ha (5 acres). Territories are marked by a series of shallow pits or "scrapes", which is digging holes (up to 1.6 m in wide and 0.3 m in deep) with forefeet or antlers, into which the males urinate and from which emanates a strong, musky odor. Fights between rival males for territorial disputes, which occur by using hooves and antlers, are sometimes fierce and long and may even be fatal.

The gestation period lasts for seven months. Hinds (does) give birth to a single fawn, weighing 4.5 to 7.0 kg (10 to 15 lb), which is nursed for up to 10 months. The mother hides her fawn in thick undergrowth immediately after giving birth, and the fawn stays very quiet and still while it waits until the mother returns to nurse it. The fawn becomes independent 10 to 12 months after birth, and attains sexual maturity at 16 to 18 months in both sexes. The average lifespan is 15 to 18 years in captivity, although one case is recorded as living 25 years and 5 months.

The sika deer may interbreed with the red deer, the closest relative; hybrid descendants may have adaptive advantages over purebred relatives.

In Nara Prefecture, Japan, the deer are also known as "bowing deer", as they have learned to bow their heads before being fed special shika senbei (鹿せんべい, called "deer cookies"). Deer also bow their head to signal that they are about to headbutt, so when a human "bows" to a deer, the deer may take it as a challenge, and will assume the same stance before charging and attempting to headbutt the person. Deer headbutt both for play and to assert dominance, as do goats. Sika deer are found throughout the city of Nara and its many parks like Nara Park and temples like Tōdai-ji, as they are considered to be the messengers of the Shinto gods.

== Habitat ==
Sika deer are found in the temperate and subtropical forests of eastern Asia, preferring areas with dense understory and occasional clearings and where snowfall does not exceed 10–20 cm (4–8 in), though in their native range, they have been known to frequent areas with a maximum snow depth up to 50 cm (19.6 in). They tend to forage in patchy clearings of forests. Introduced populations are found in areas with similar habitats to their native ranges, including Western and Central Europe, Eastern United States, and New Zealand.

== Population ==
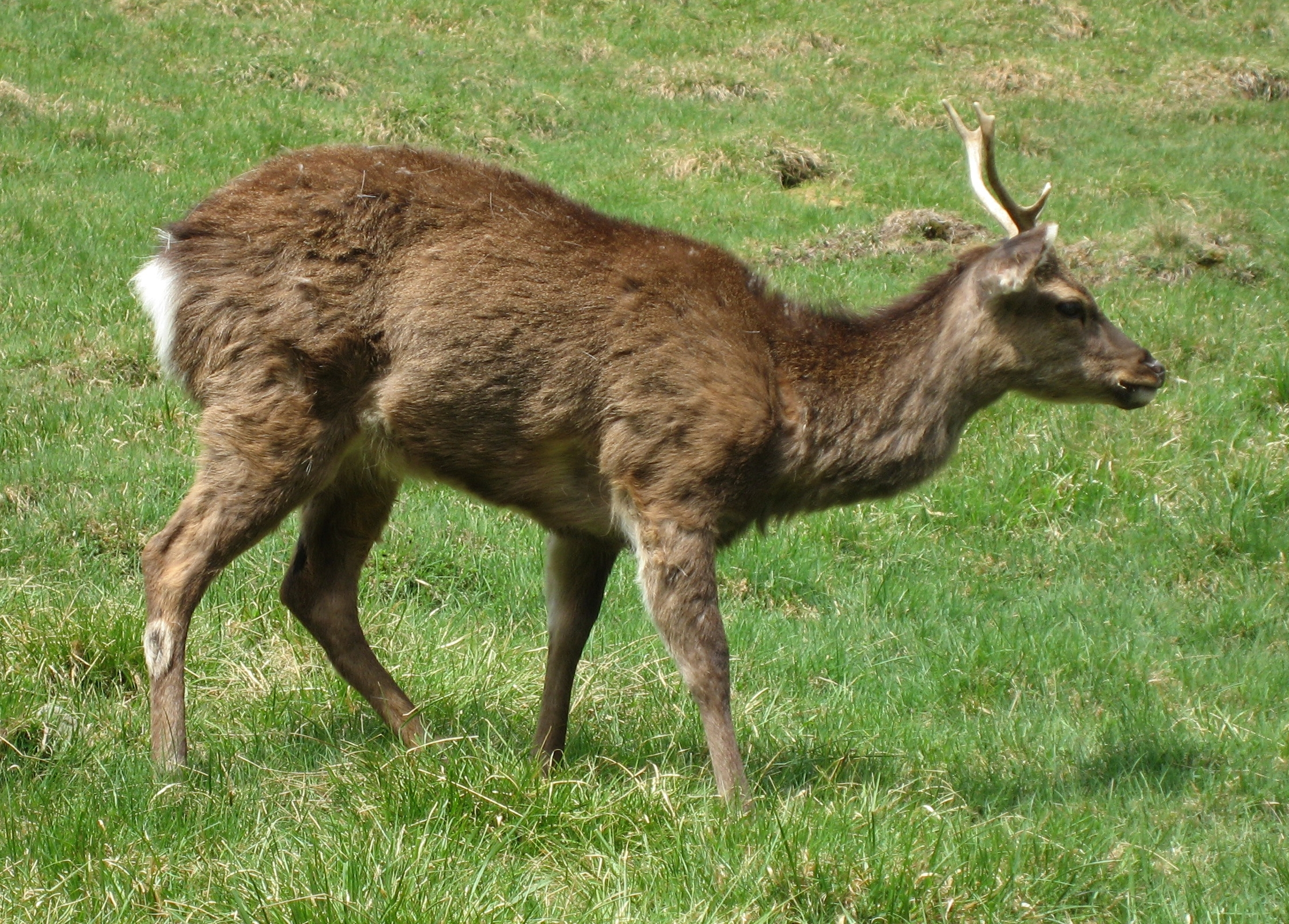
Formosan sika deer

Sika deer inhabit temperate and subtropical woodlands, often in areas suitable for farming and other human exploitation. Their range encompasses some of the most densely populated areas in the world, where forests were cleared hundreds of years ago. Their population status varies significantly in different countries. Although the species as a whole is thriving, it is endangered and extinct in many areas.

Japan has by far the largest native sika population in the world. The population was estimated to be between 170,000 and 330,000 individuals in 1993, mainly due to recent conservation efforts and the extinction of its main predator, the Japanese wolf (Canis lupus hodophilax), over a century ago. Without its main predator, the population of sika exploded and it is now overpopulated in many areas, posing a threat to both forests and farmlands. Efforts are now being made to control its population instead of conserving it. None of its subspecies is endangered except the Kerama deer (C. n. keramae) on the tiny Kerama Islands. In 2015, Japanese Ministry of the Environment estimated the population at 3,080,000 in Japan, including Hokkaido.

China used to have the largest population of sika, but thousands of years of hunting and habitat loss have reduced the population to less than 1,000. Of the five subspecies in China, the North China sika deer (C. n. mandarinus) is believed to be extinct in the wild since the 1930s; the Shanxi sika deer (C. n. grassianus) has not been seen in the wild since the 1980s and is also believed to be extinct in the wild. The status of Manchurian sika deer in China is unclear, though it is also believed to be extinct, and the sightings there are actually feral populations.

The South China sika deer (C. n. kopschi) and Sichuan sika deer (C. n. sichuanicus) are the only subspecies known to remain in the wild in China. The former exists in fragmented populations of around 300 in southeast China, while the latter is found in a single population of over 400. The feral population is likely to be much higher than the wild, though most of them are descended from domesticated sikas of mixed subspecies. All of the subspecies are present in captivity, but a lack of suitable habitats and government efforts prevent their reintroduction.

The Formosan sika deer (C. n. taioanus) has been extinct in the wild for almost two decades before individuals from zoos were introduced to Kenting National Park; the population now numbers 200. Reintroduction programs are also under way in Vietnam, where the Vietnamese sika deer (C. n. pseudaxis) is extinct or nearly so.

Russia has a relatively large and stable population of 8,500–9,000 individuals of the Manchurian subspecies, but this is limited to a small area in Primorsky Krai. Small populations might exist in North Korea, but the political situation makes investigation impossible. The original stock of sika deer in South Korea is extinct, with only captive stock raised for medicine from other parts of the deer's habitat. But in June 2020, an unmanned camera located a doe and fawn which might hold proof for Korea's last native sika deer, although the claim is contested!

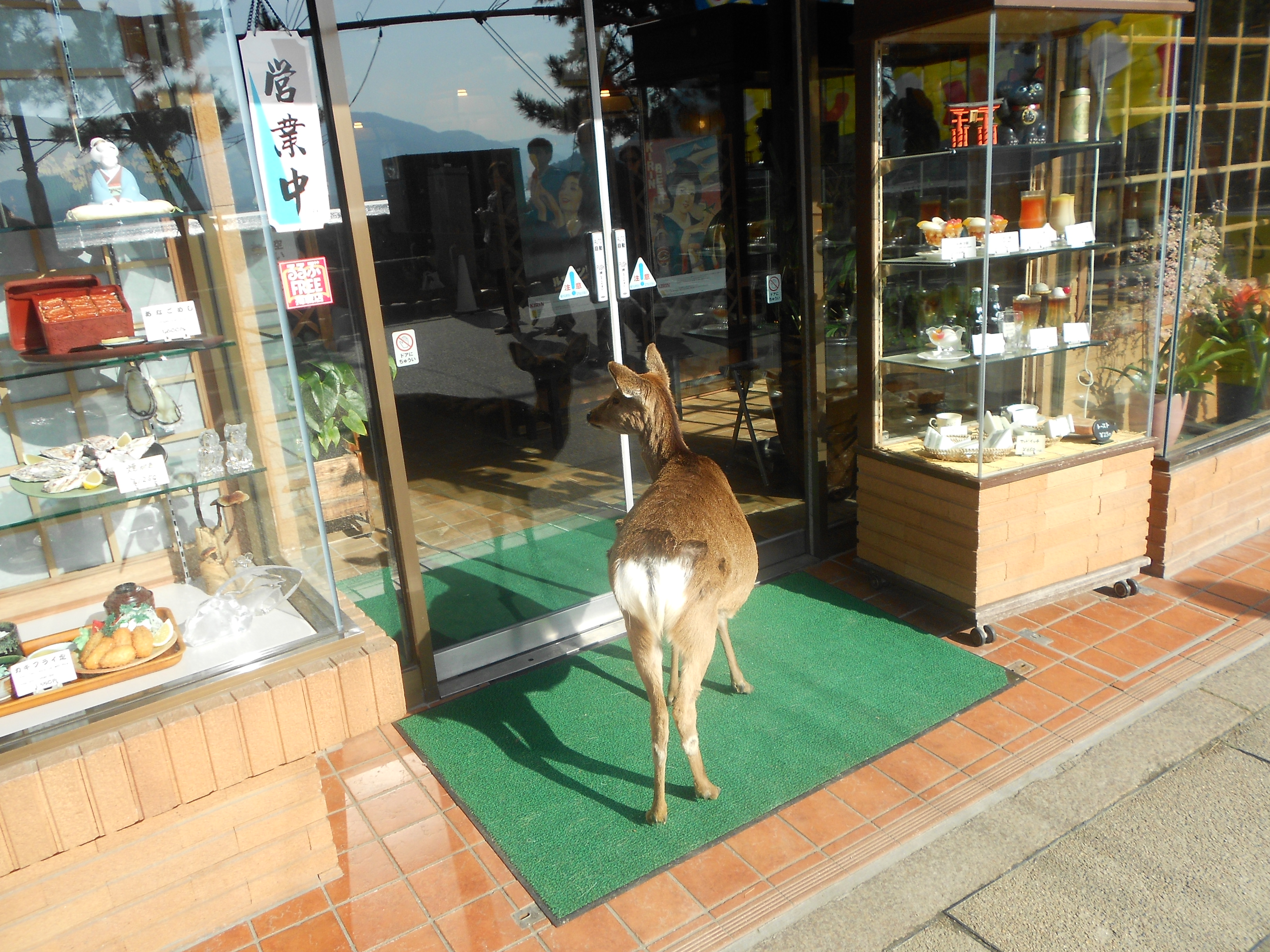
Outside of a store on the island of Miyajima

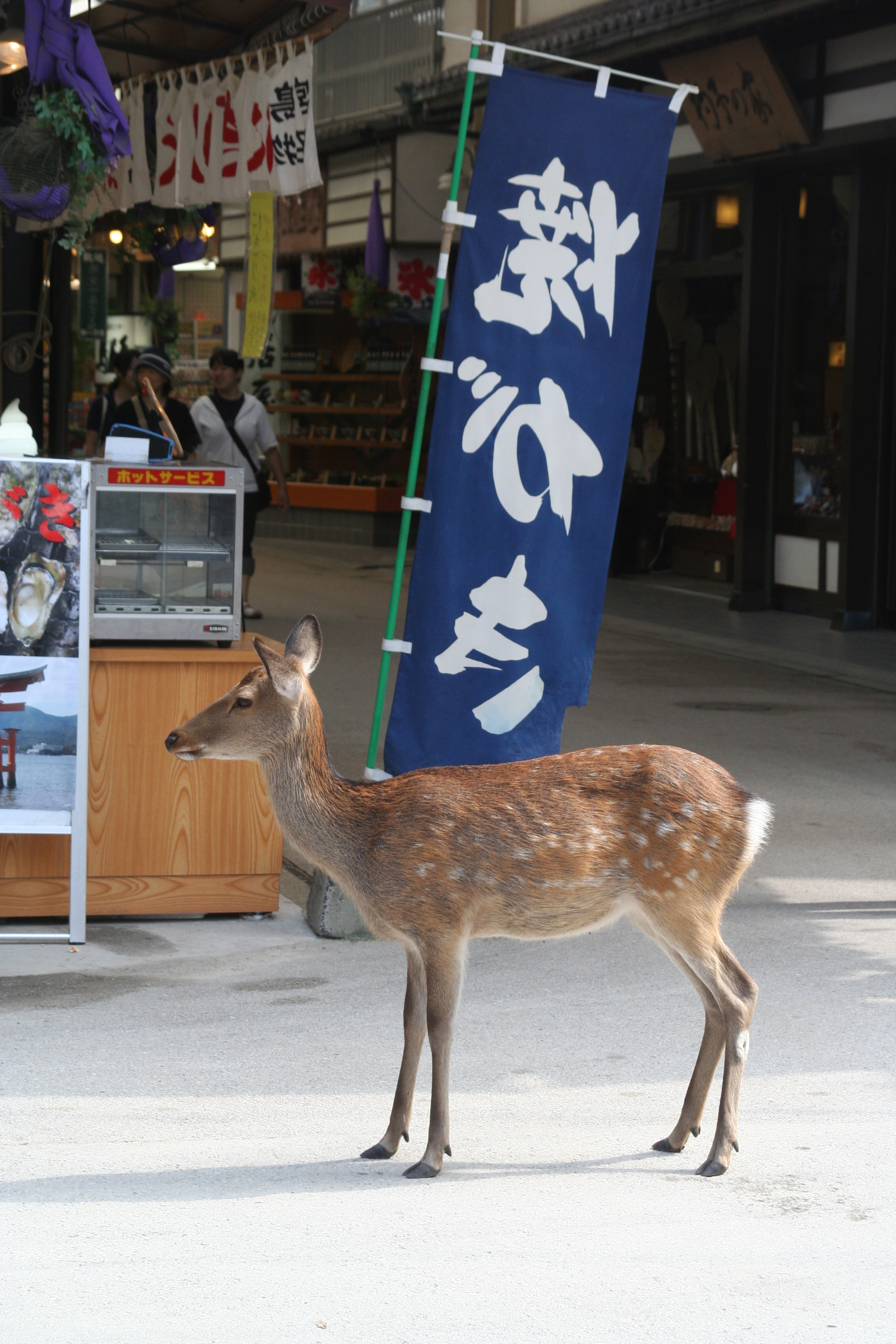
Tame deer wandering the streets of the town of Miyajima, Japan

=== Introduced populations ===
Sika deer have been introduced into a number of other countries, including Estonia, Latvia, Lithuania, Austria, Belgium, Denmark, France, Germany, Ireland, Netherlands, Norway, Switzerland, Russia, Romania, New Zealand, Australia, the Philippines (Jolo Island), Poland, Sweden, Finland, Canada, the United Kingdom, and the United States (in Delaware, Maryland, Oklahoma, Nebraska, Pennsylvania, Wisconsin, Virginia, Indiana, Michigan, Minnesota, Maine, New York, Texas, and Wyoming). In many cases, they were originally introduced as ornamental animals in parklands, but have established themselves in the wild. On Spieden Island in the San Juan Islands of Washington, they were introduced as a game animal.

In the UK and Ireland, several distinct feral populations now exist, in addition to about 1000 individuals in deer parks. Some of these are in isolated areas, for example on the island of Lundy, but others are contiguous with populations of the native red deer. Since the two species sometimes hybridize, a serious conservation concern exists. In the United Kingdom, Sika deer are most common in Scotland, with scattered smaller populations in England - particularly Cumbria, Lancashire, Dorset and in the New Forest - and Northern Ireland. The introduced populations of the United Kingdom are exclusively of the nominate subspecies C. n. nippon.

In research which rated the negative impact of introduced mammals in Europe, the sika deer was found to be among the most damaging to the environment and economy, along with the brown rat and muskrat. The European Union has included it in the list of invasive alien species of Union concern and hence it cannot be imported, bred, transported, commercialized, or intentionally released into the environment in any of its member states.

In the 1900s, King Edward VII presented a pair of sika deer to John, the second Baron Montagu of Beaulieu. This pair escaped into Sowley Wood and were the basis of the sika to be found in the New Forest today. They were so prolific, culling had to be introduced in the 1930s to control their numbers.

== Hunting ==
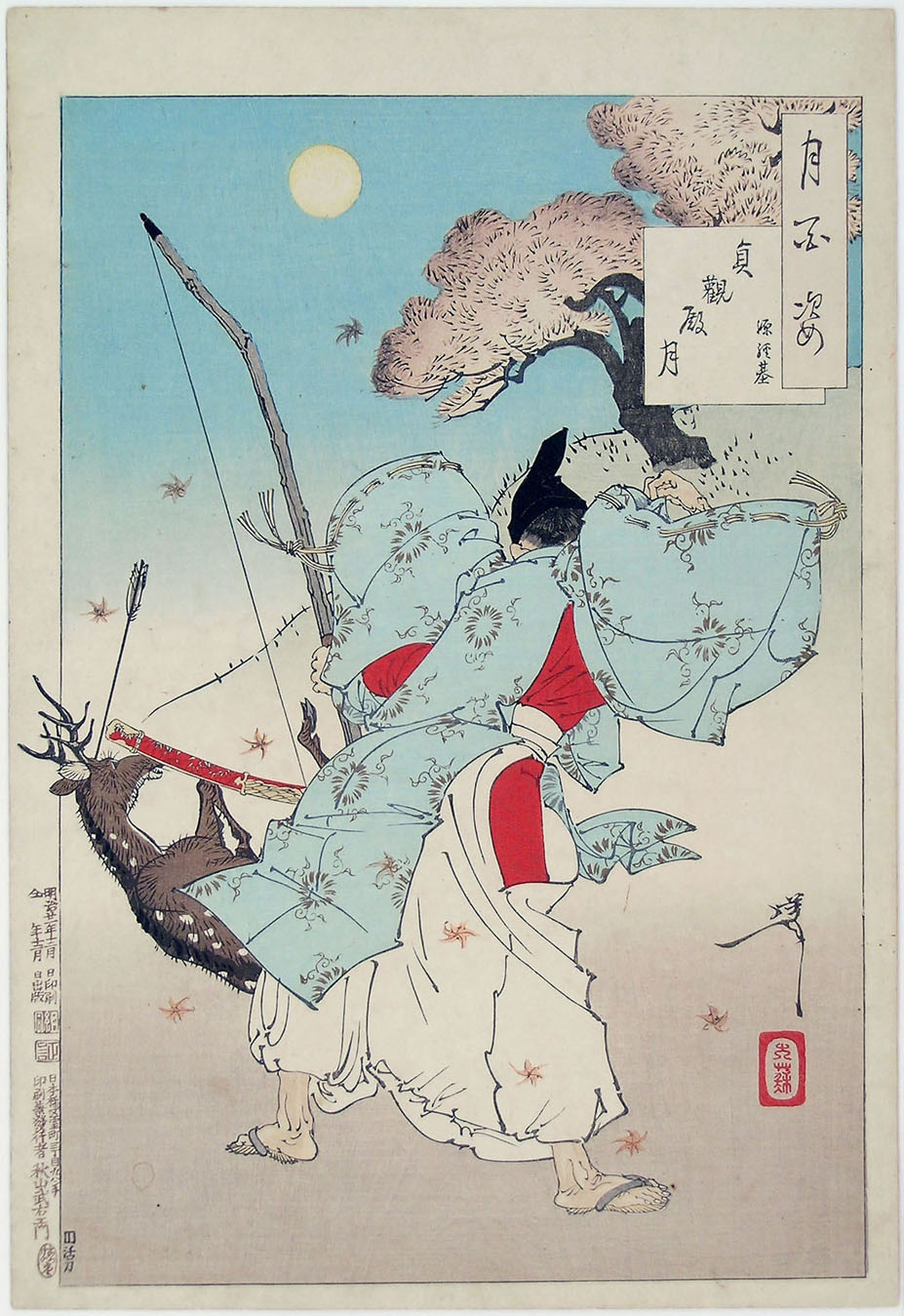
Tsukioka Yoshitoshi ukiyo-e depicting the Minamoto no Tsunemoto hunting a sika with a yumi

Across its original range and in many areas to which it has been introduced, the sika is regarded as a particularly prized and elusive sportsman's quarry. In Britain, Ireland, and mainland Europe, sika display very different survival strategies and escape tactics from the indigenous deer. They have a marked tendency to use concealment in circumstances when red deer, for example, would flee, and have been seen to squat and lie belly-flat when danger threatens.

In the British Isles, sika are widely regarded as a serious threat to new and established woodlands, and public and private forestry bodies adopt policies of rigorous year-round culling.

The main predators of sika deer include tigers, wolves, leopards, and brown bears. Lynx and golden eagles target fawns.

== Deer farming ==
=== Velvet antler ===
Velvet antler (dried precalcified antlers) is a popular ingredient in traditional Chinese medicine, and sika deer were domesticated by deer farms in China long ago for the antler trade, along with several other species. In Taiwan, both Formosan sika deer and Formosan sambar deer (Cervus unicolor swinhoei) have been farmed for velvet antlers. Japan is the only country in East Asia where sika deer were not farmed for velvet antlers.

Other deer raised for the antler trade were Thorold's deer (Cervus albirostris), central Asian red deer (Cervus hanglu), and American elk (Cervus canadensis).

== Cultural significance ==
In Shinto, the Shika Deer is considered a kind of messenger between mortals and the kami.

== See also ==
- Deer of Great Britain
- Nara Park
