= Elk farming =

Elk farming is an agricultural industry for the production of elk as livestock or for the sport of hunting. Elk have a variety of uses. The velvet antler or, the antler in the premature stages of growth, is believed by some to have medicinal purposes. Elk are also raised for venison, their meat. All of these markets are rising in popularity thus causing an increase in the breeding industry. Other species of similar type are farmed in the same way such as deer, moose, and red stag.

== Livestock ==
=== In Canada ===
Elk farming has been an industry in the province of Alberta for decades, with a peak of 600 elk farms in the industry's heyday; in 2022, only 134 remained. The Canadian Food Inspection Agency has strictly regulated elk farming due to concerns about chronic wasting disease (CWD), a prion disease that affects elk and other members in the deer family. Both Alberta and neighbouring Saskatchewan required all deer and elk farmers to test every animal that dies on their farms for CWD.

Manitoba has a 40 year history of elk farming.

=== In the United States ===
The elk farming market is relatively new to the United States. In its early stages, the breeding stock has become of high value. The same standard for cattle also pertains to the production of elk: the bigger the better. In 1990, the North American Elk Breeders Association (NAEBA) was founded. NAEBA has set up rules and regulations for breed purity and strength, ownership, and marketing. They help the industry continually increase in production and quality of animal.

Elk do not need the close care that it takes to raise cattle because of their strong, hardy nature. They will eat just about any plants they can find, ranging from grass, shrubs, weeds, and even tree bark. The most common feeds are alfalfa and grain. In an area suitable for one beef cow, two to three elk may be kept comfortably. Elk may eat 2 to 3 percent of their body weight daily. On average a female elk (cow) has a live weight of 450 to 650 pounds. Male elk (bulls) are much larger, weighing from 800 to 1,000 pounds. Elk need an increase in nutrients so that they can produce better products. For example, before and during breeding, while the antlers are growing so they will produce a larger amount of velvet, and after calving.

The facilities that hold elk are different than those for cattle. The fence is made of high-tensile wire, which provides strength and durability, and should be at least 8 feet high. The area should provide a large grazing area along with a fresh water supply and shelter. It is recommended that a strand of barbed wire be stretched at ground level to keep predators out and calves in. Electrified wire placed slightly above ground level is another option.

== Breeding ==
Elk breed from early September through November. This period is called the rut. A cow will give birth after a 250-day gestation. The calves are carried throughout the winter. Therefore, it is necessary that they are well fed and receive the needed nutrients during this period. If they are well taken care of, the elk will have up to a 95% pregnancy rate. Calves are born from May through July. Cow elk can begin to breed after 18 months, but bulls should wait to mature for two to three years. A cow elk can breed for more than 15 years effectively. The estrus cycle is about 21 days. A bull may breed as many as 20 cows in a season.

It has become a common practice amongst elk breeders to use artificial insemination, a method of ensuring male genetic superiority—e.g., a bull with large antlers will pass that trait onto his offspring. For this purpose the semen is bought and the cow is bred artificially with the hope that the young will receive that genetic trait. Through artificial insemination and semen preservation, a sire can continue to produce offspring even after he is dead or his health has declined.

== Products ==
Velvet antler, the antler in the premature growing stages, is the main product derived from mature bull elk. In the second year of a bull elk life the antler begins to grow and continues to do so every year after that. The velvet is harvested while in the late stages of growth, just before it starts to turn into antler. That is when it calcifies and becomes hard like bone. A mature bull will produce 20 pounds or more of velvet annually. The current record is about 50 pounds in North America.

Velvet antler is tissue that is living and growing rapidly. It can grow up to one half pound a day. Because it is living, the velvet must be removed surgically. Like in any operation precautionary measures are taken to ensure the humane care and safety of the animal. Once cut, the velvet is then frozen and shipped to the manufacturer where it is then made into a consumable substance. Recent studies have shown that velvet contains large amounts of minerals with natural anti-inflammatory agents.

== Venison ==
There is a growing demand for elk meat around the world. Elk meat is famous for its taste as well as its health benefits, as it is high in protein but low in fat, cholesterol, and calories.
