= Sichuan sika deer =

Scientific classification
- Kingdom: Animalia
- Phylum: Chordata
- Class: Mammalia
- Infraclass: Placentalia
- Order: Artiodactyla
- Family: Cervidae
- Genus: Cervus
- Species: C. nippon
- Subspecies: C. n. sichuanicus

Trinomial name
- Cervus nippon sichuanicus Guo, Chen and Wang, 1978

Subspecies of deer

The Sichuan sika deer (Cervus nippon sichuanicus) is one of the many subspecies of sika deer. It was discovered in 1978 and was proven to be a distinct subspecies. It is found in the mountains of northern Sichuan and southern Gansu, which holds the largest population of Sika Deer in China. There are currently 500 individuals left in the wild, and the numbers appear to be stable.

The conducted study by Zhao et al. (2014) reported that human disturbance contributed to the evolution of the Sichuan Sika Deer. Human activities such as roads and grazing increase the chances of these species losing their habitats. Zhao et al. (2014) had also stated that Sichuan Sika Deer preferred habitats with bushlands and forests, particularly because in these habitats, they had a better reproductive success and efficient use of their resources. Additionally, their territory selection is impacted by the proximity with water. Zhao et al (2014) had identified that these species prefer habitats no further than 550 mm from the nearest body of water. Finding a habitat from a certain distance to the nearest body of water ensures that these species have a high survival rate as they can find a good availability of food and remain hydrated.
