= Shanxi sika deer =

Scientific classification
- Kingdom: Animalia
- Phylum: Chordata
- Class: Mammalia
- Order: Artiodactyla
- Family: Cervidae
- Genus: Cervus
- Species: C. nippon
- Subspecies: C. n. grassianus

Trinomial name
- Cervus nippon grassianus (Heude, 1884)

Subspecies of deer

The Shanxi sika deer (Cervus nippon grassianus) is a possibly extinct subspecies of the sika deer. It is also one of its largest, being 105–110 cm tall at the shoulders and weighing 100 kg. The color is tawny or grayish dark, and is brown on the back of the leg. The spots are nearly invisible. It is previously found in two populations in the upland forests of Lüliang Mountains in western Shanxi, while its range might be much larger in historical times, encompassing the entire Loess Plateau. There has been no sightings of the subspecies for decades and it is now believed to be extinct, though no actual investigations have been done. Although pure bred individuals remain in farms as a breed, there is not enough suitable habitat nor government effort for reintroduction to take place.
