= South China sika deer =

Scientific classification
- Domain: Eukaryota
- Kingdom: Animalia
- Phylum: Chordata
- Class: Mammalia
- Order: Artiodactyla
- Family: Cervidae
- Genus: Cervus
- Species: C. nippon
- Subspecies: C. n. kopschi

Trinomial name
- Cervus nippon kopschi Swinhoe, 1873

Subspecies of deer

The South China sika deer (Cervus nippon kopschi) is one of many subspecies of sika deer. Standing 85 cm or 33 in tall at the shoulders, it is a small subspecies that is only a little larger than its Japanese counterpart. The back is brown with a long dark vertebral strip flanked from indistinct white spots, the belly is snowy white. It has previously ranged from Yangtze River Basin all the way east to the coast, going as far south as the border with Vietnam. Today its small population of 300 is widely scattered along its former range, in remote mountains isolated by heavily populated lowlands. About 30 exists in the Tianmu Mountains in northern Zhejiang, 70 to 100 in southern Anhui, and 150 in northern Jiangxi. The population size in southern Guangxi is unknown, and a tiny population might exist in northern Guangdong as well. The population continues to decline due to poaching, and inbreeding is a matter of concern for the quality of its future population.
