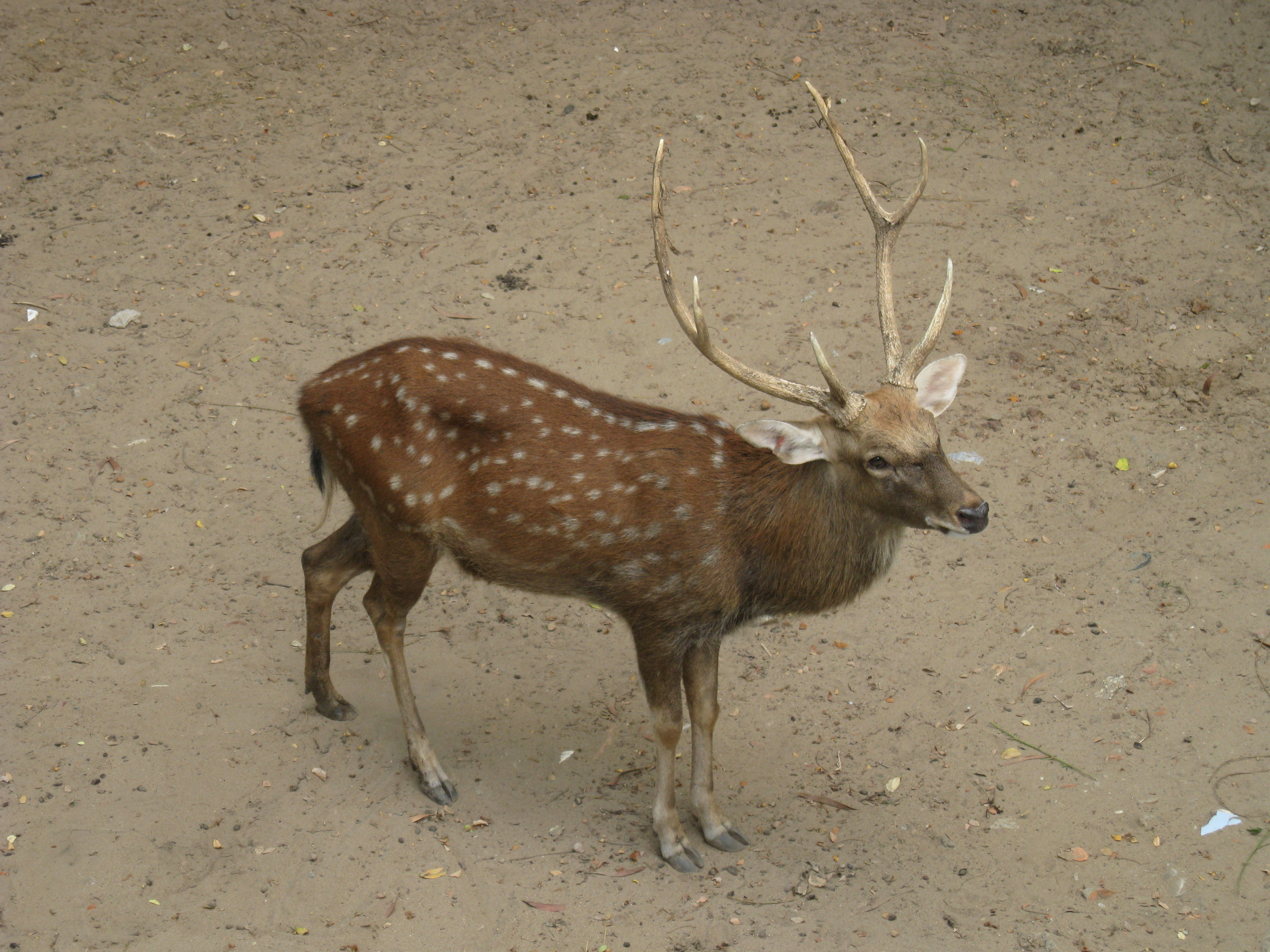

Scientific classification
- Kingdom: Animalia
- Phylum: Chordata
- Class: Mammalia
- Order: Artiodactyla
- Family: Cervidae
- Genus: Cervus
- Species: C. nippon
- Subspecies: C. n. pseudaxis

Trinomial name
- Cervus nippon pseudaxis Gervais, 1841

= Vietnamese sika deer =

Subspecies of deer

The Vietnamese sika deer (Cervus nippon pseudaxis) also known as the indochinese sika deer is one of the many subspecies of the sika deer. It is one of the smaller subspecies, due to the tropical environment they live in. They were previously found in northern Vietnam and possibly southwestern China, but may now be extinct in the wild. There are plans for reintroducing this subspecies in the future.

Pressures from the human populations have continued to harm any remaining deer in the wild, triggering a loss of genetic diversity that can be attributed to the remaining populations being so fragmented.

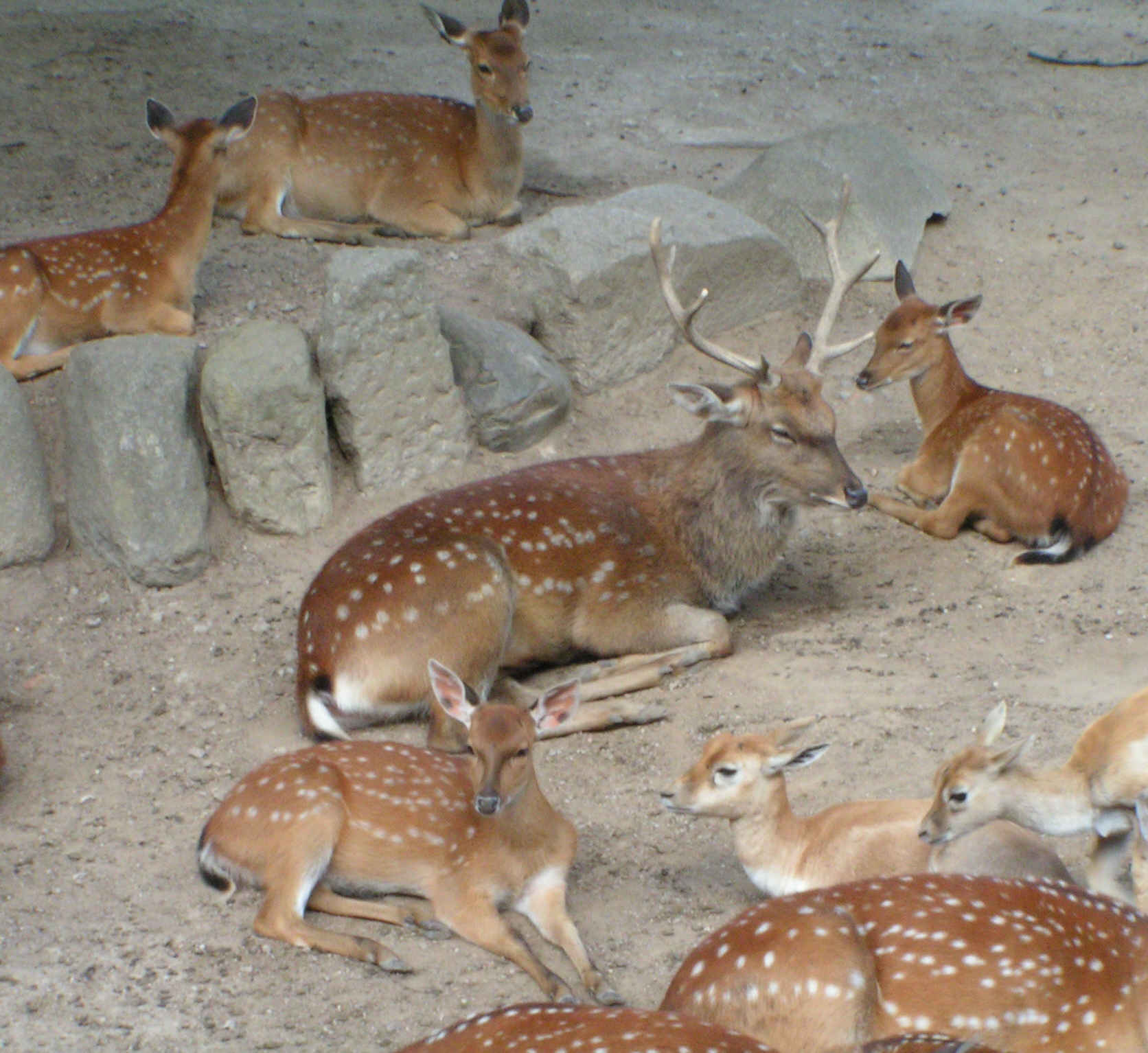
A group of Vietnamese sika deer
