= Velvet antler =

Fuzzy vascular coat on antlers

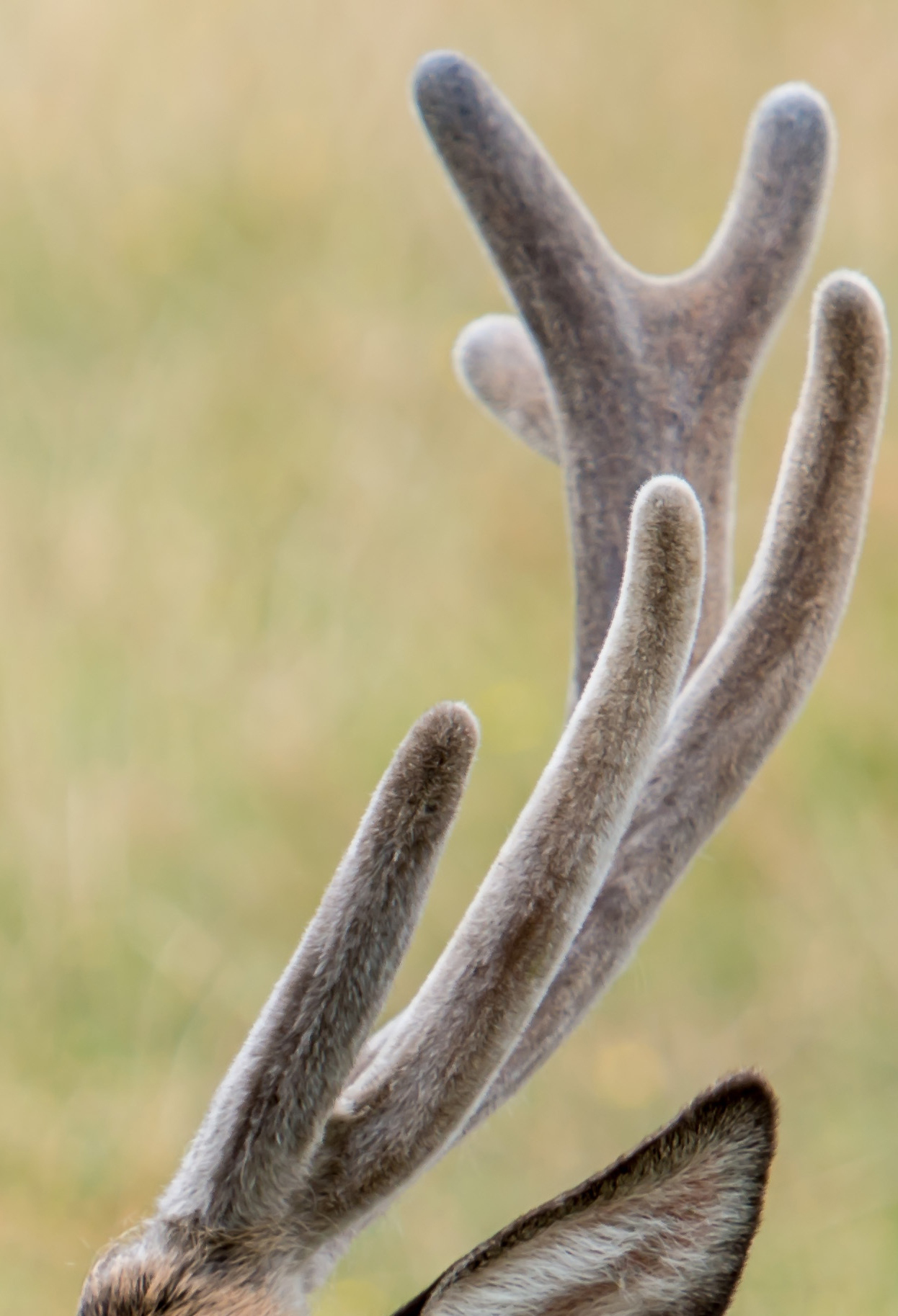
A fuzzy velvet antler during summer growth

Velvet antler is the whole cartilaginous antler in a precalcified growth stage of the Cervidae family, including the species of deer, such as red deer, elk, moose, and caribou. A velvet antler is covered in a hairy, soft "skin" known as velvet, with the developing antler having rounded tines during its annual growth and remaining uncalcified.

Velvet antler preparations are sold in China as part of traditional Chinese medicine, and in some countries as a dietary supplement. Marketing claims of health effects are not supported by scientific evidence, and the US Food and Drug Administration has warned companies selling the products about false advertising.

== Industry ==
Most of the world's supply of velvet antler comes from Sika deer, red deer, and elk (also called wapiti), including a large deer ranching industry in New Zealand. New Zealand is the world's largest producer of velvet. Australia, China, Russia, United States, and Canada also produce velvet antler products for the supplement market.

== Farming and ranching ==
Moose, elk and deer produce new antlers yearly (primarily males, except in caribou/reindeer). In New Zealand, deer are subjected to local anesthesia and restrained during antler removal, and the procedure is supervised by licensed veterinarians. Typically, the antler is cut off near the base after it is about two-thirds of its potential full size, between 55 and 65 days of growth, before any significant calcification occurs. The procedure is generally done around June in the Northern Hemisphere and December in the Southern Hemisphere.

== Uses ==
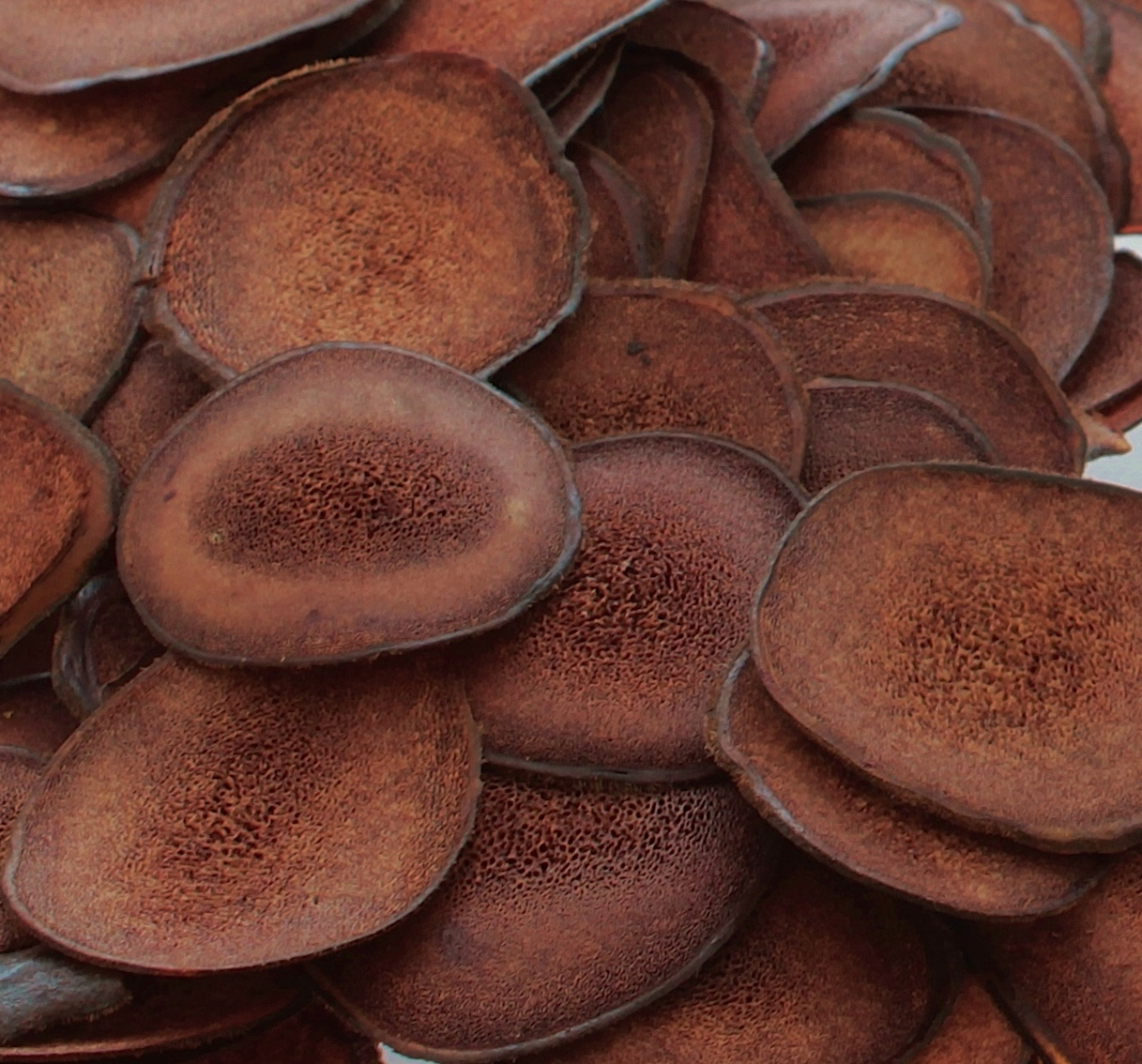
Sliced velvet antler used in traditional Chinese soup

Velvet antler has been used in traditional Chinese medicine (TCM) that classifies many similar substances from a variety of species under the Chinese character name 鹿茸; (pinyin: lùróng) and the commercial name cornu cervi pantorichum. The two common species used in the TCM system are sika deer and red deer which are thought to be useful for treating yang deficiency syndromes.

In Asia, velvet antler is dried and sold as slices, or as a powder which may be boiled in water, usually with other herbs and ingredients, and consumed as a soup. In the traditional commercial trade of Korea and China, whole stick antler velvet is divided into three sections based upon their supposed properties. Although there is an absence of uniform standardization, these sections are known as the wax piece (uppers or tips), the blood piece (middles), and the bone piece (bottoms): the wax piece may be marketed as a growth tonic for children, the blood piece supposedly for joint and bone effects, and the bone piece supposedly for calcium deficiency and geriatric needs. Early commercial activity in Russia between the 1930s and 1980s led to the production of an alcohol extract from deer antler velvet marketed under the Russian drug trade name Pantocrin (also pantocrine or pantokrin).

In the West, velvet antler is dried, powdered, and consumed in encapsulated form or via aqueous alcohol extract as a dietary supplement, for which it is monitored for potential manufacturing and advertising violations by the US Food and Drug Administration and the Federal Trade Commission.

A review published in 2012 summarized results from clinical research, including three studies on sports performance: "Claims that velvet antler supplements have beneficial effects for any human condition are not supported by sound clinical data from human trials."

== Marketing and FDA warning letters ==
Companies attributing health claims from using dietary supplements of velvet antler have received warning letters from the Food and Drug Administration (FDA) concerning the sale of encapsulated powders connected to their marketing claims. The claims were in violation of the United States Food, Drug and Cosmetic Act [21 USC/321 (g)(1)][36] because they "establish the product as a drug intended for use in the cure, mitigation, treatment, or prevention of disease" when velvet antler has no such scientific evaluation. Additionally stated by the FDA, velvet antler was "not generally recognized as safe and effective for the referenced conditions" and therefore must be treated as a "new drug" under Section 21(p) of the Act. New drugs may not be legally marketed in the United States without prior approval of the FDA. As of 2018, it is legal to sell velvet antler powder, extract or spray in the U.S. as a dietary supplement as long as no disease treatment claims are made and the label bears the FDA disclaimer: "This product has not been evaluated by the FDA. It is not intended to diagnose, treat, cure or prevent any disease."

== Deer antler spray ==
Velvet antler in the form of deer antler spray has been at the center of multiple controversies with professional sports leagues and famous athletes allegedly using it for injury recovery and performance enhancement purposes. In mid-2011, National Football League (NFL) linebacker David Vobora successfully sued a deer antler velvet spray manufacturer for a total amount of $5.4 million after testing positive for methyltestosterone in 2009, which originated from the velvet antler supplement he was taking. In August 2011, the Major League Baseball added deer antler spray to their list of prohibited items because it contains "potentially contaminated nutritional supplements."

On January 30, 2013, Vijay Singh professional PGA Tour golfer was caught unaware and openly admitted to the personal use of deer antler spray which contained a banned substance at the time. A week later the World Anti-Doping Agency (WADA) lifted the ban on deer antler spray, but with urgency, "Deer Antler Velvet Spray may contain IGF-1 and WADA recommends therefore that athletes be extremely vigilant with this supplement because it could lead to a positive test." The consensus of leading endocrinologists concerning any purported claims and benefits "is simply that there is far too little of the substance in even the purest forms of the spray to make any difference", and "there is no medically valid way to deliver IGF-1 orally or in a spray."

=== S.W.A.T.S. ===
S.W.A.T.S. Fitness and Performance was a dietary supplement company that sold deer antler spray and other products. The owners began distributing their products to NCAA and NFL athletes in 2008. The controversy initially started on March 30, 2009, when Alabama athletic officials sent a cease-and-desist letter to the company's owner that stated: "Refrain from using current student-athletes to endorse products. Refrain from contacting current student-athletes. Refrain from giving or selling products to current student-athletes." The letter was then sent again in 2012.

In September 2011, S.W.A.T.S lost a lawsuit for $5.4 million dollars concerning an NFL athlete who had tested positive for methyl testosterone. In early January 2013 an NFL athlete was accused, by the owner, of taking S.W.A.T.S. deer antler spray for an injury who further failed to provide proof and made a formal apology.

In September 2013, the headquarters of S.W.A.T.S. was raided and ordered to be shut down by Alabama's attorney general citing "numerous serious and willful violations of Alabama's deceptive trade practices act". Among the violations were "claims that the company made about a number of products that were unsupported by scientific research. Some of these products were marketed as 'dietary supplements'." The assistant Alabama attorney general "says that Deer Antler Spray is dangerous and its sellers are law-breakers."
