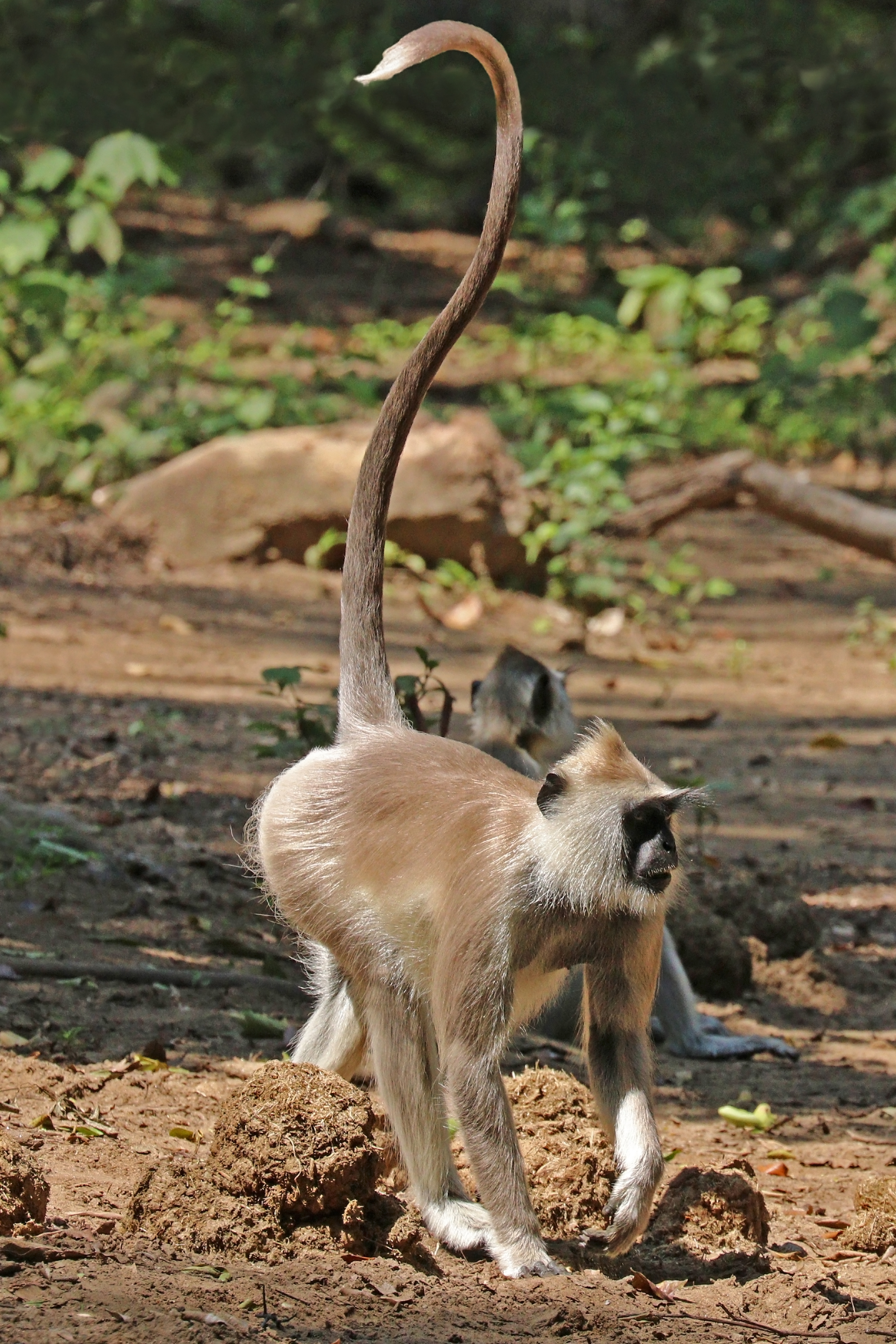
- in Chinnar Wildlife Sanctuary, Kerala, India

Conservation status
- Near Threatened (IUCN 3.1)
- CITES Appendix I

Scientific classification
- Kingdom: Animalia
- Phylum: Chordata
- Class: Mammalia
- Order: Primates
- Family: Cercopithecidae
- Genus: Semnopithecus
- Species: S. priam

Binomial name
- Semnopithecus priam Blyth, 1844
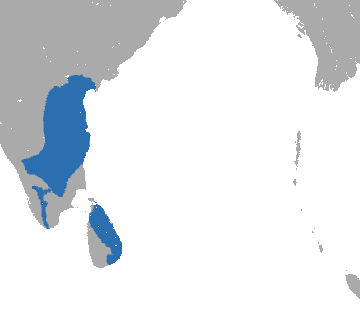
- Tufted gray langur range

= Tufted gray langur =

Species of Old World monkey

The tufted gray langur (Semnopithecus priam), also known as Madras gray langur, and Coromandel sacred langur, is an Old World monkey, one of the species of langurs. This, like other gray langurs, is mainly a leaf-eating monkey. It is found in southeast India and Sri Lanka. It is one of three Semnopithecus species named after characters from The Iliad, S. hector and S. ajax being the others. In Sinhala it is known as හැලි වඳුරා (Heli wandura).

== Taxonomy and evolution ==
There are two subspecies, Semnopithecus priam priam in India, and Semnopithecus priam thersites from Sri Lanka.

There are two theories about the evolution of these two subspecies. According to one theory, Semnopithecus priam arose from subspecies Semnopithecus vetulus philbricki. With the glacial fluctuations, and far apart from the Indian subcontinent, pushed two taxa apart, but both retained key adaptation to folivory, and a ruminant-like stomach. Thereafter, S. priam invaded India, when there was a land bridge and there split off into two subspecies of S. priam. In the other theory, Sri Lankan subspecies S. priam thersites evolved from the endemic S. vetulus, whereas, Indian subspecies S. priam priam evolved from the S. johnii, which results the genetic variations between two S. priam subspecies.

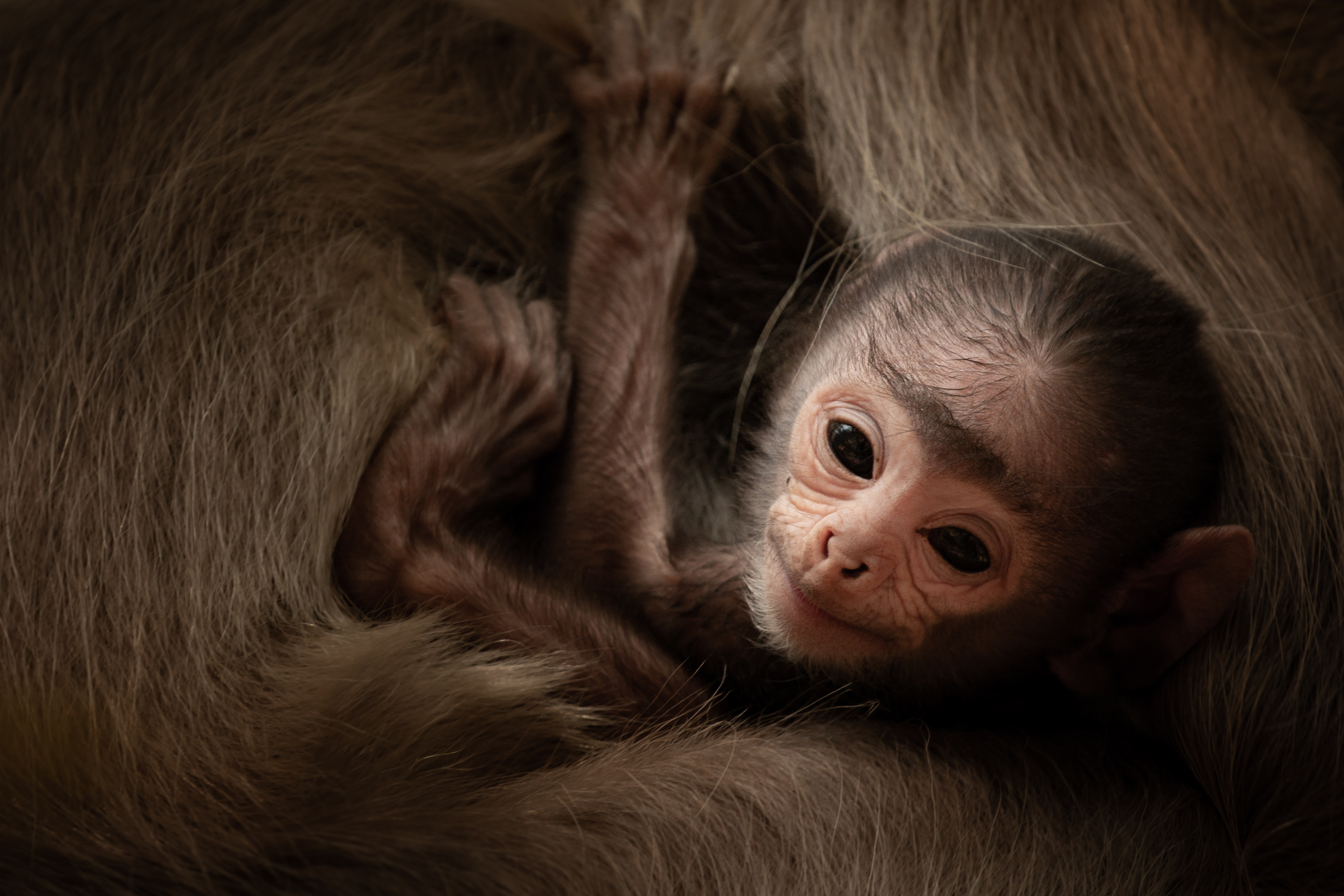
baby S. p. thersites

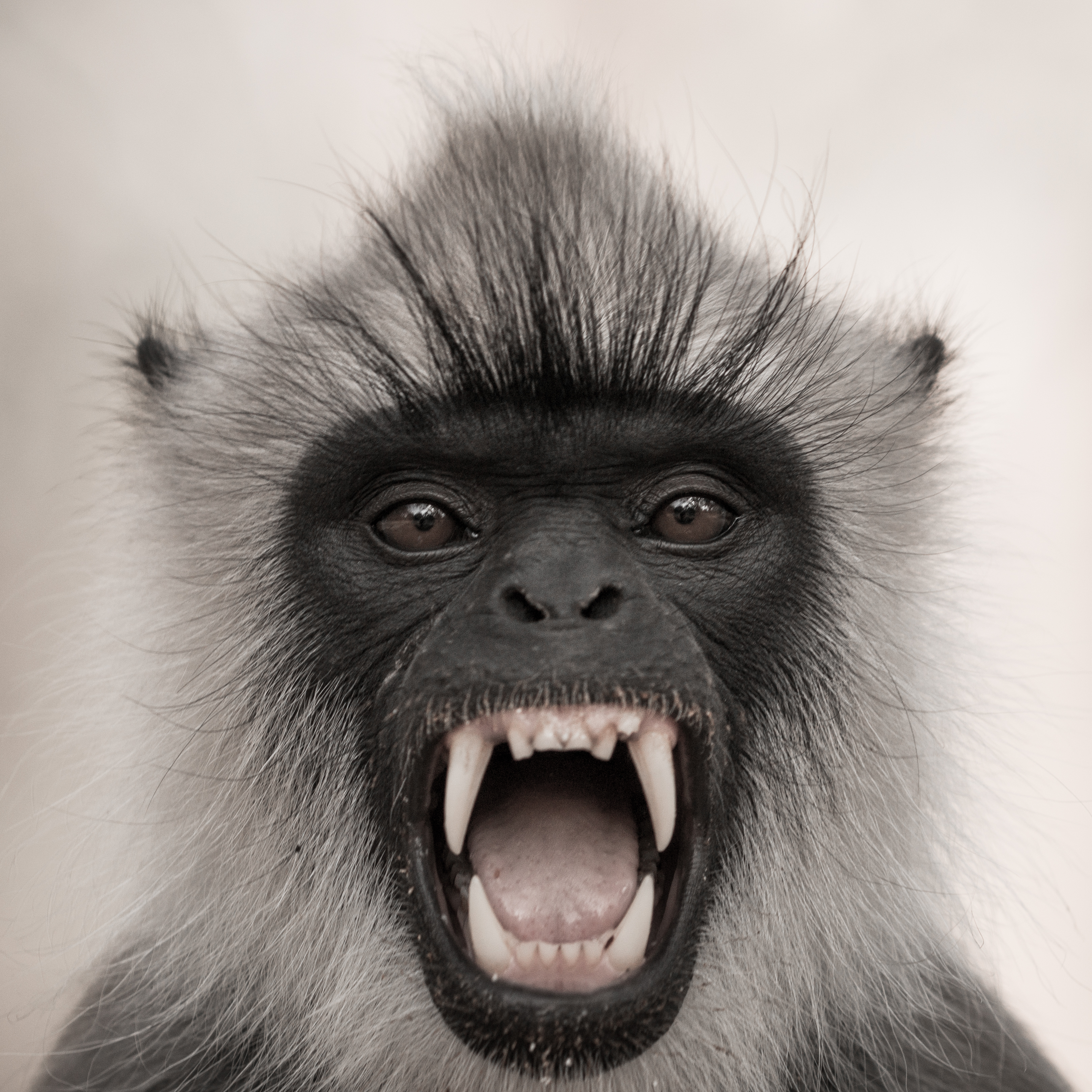
S. p. thersites

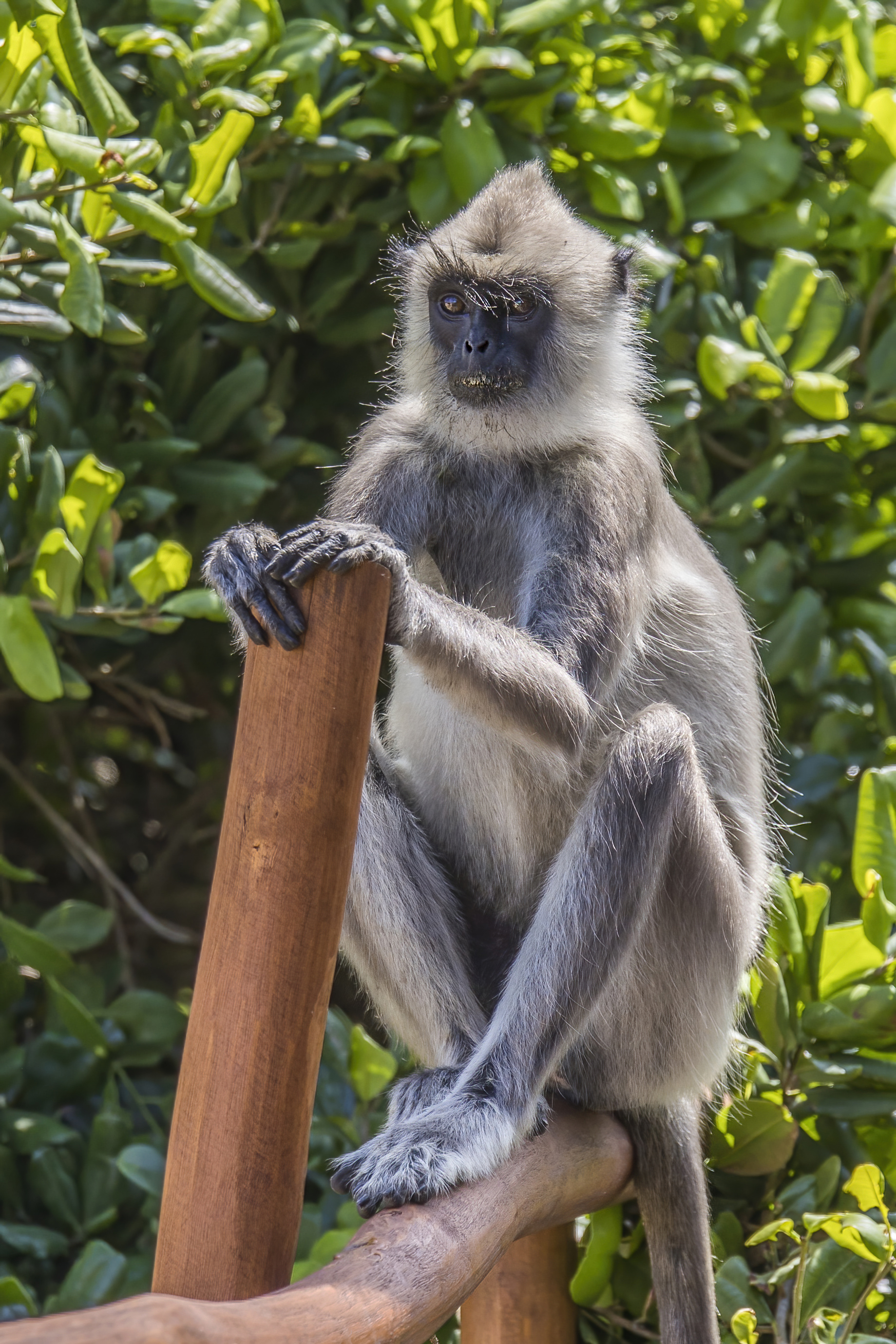
S. p. thersites

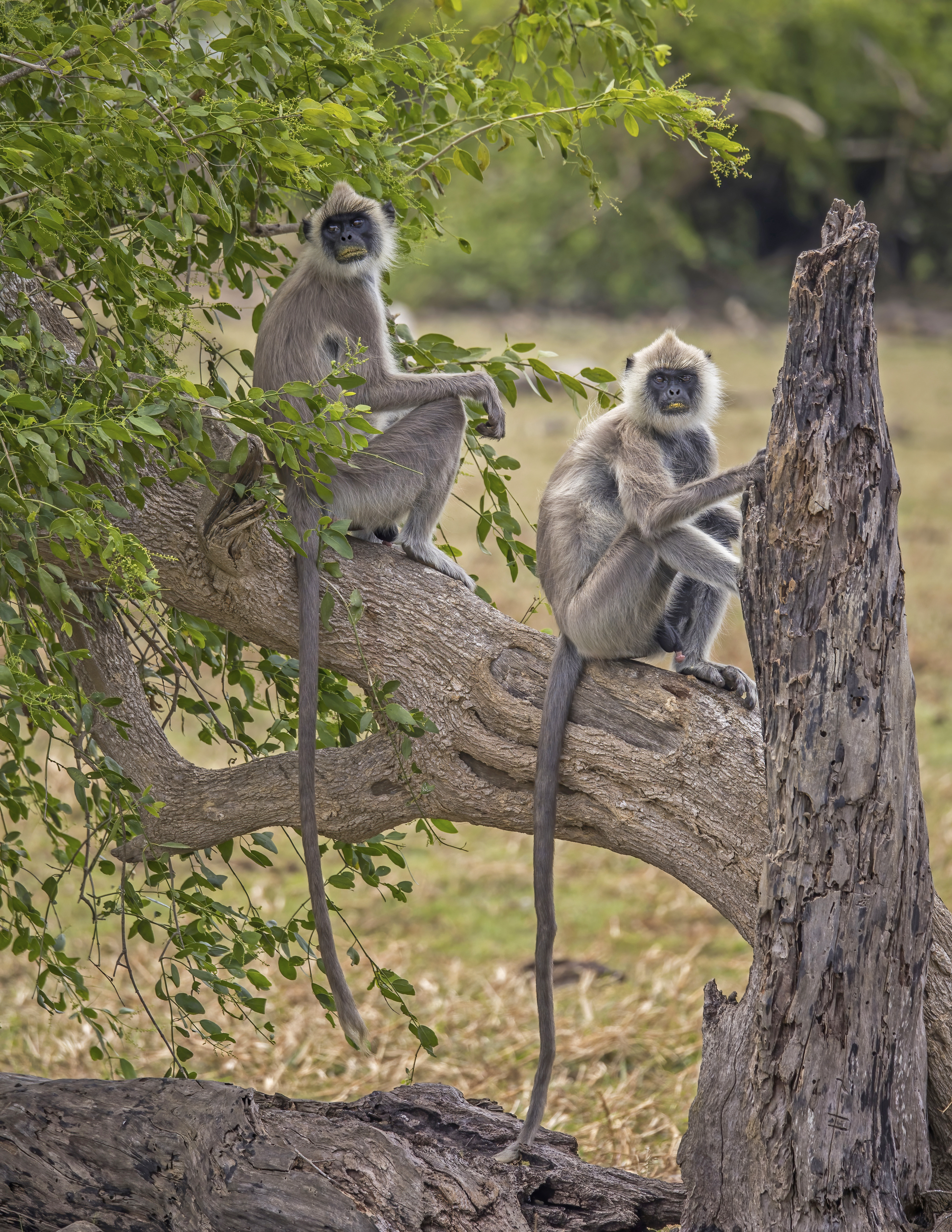
S. p. thersites males

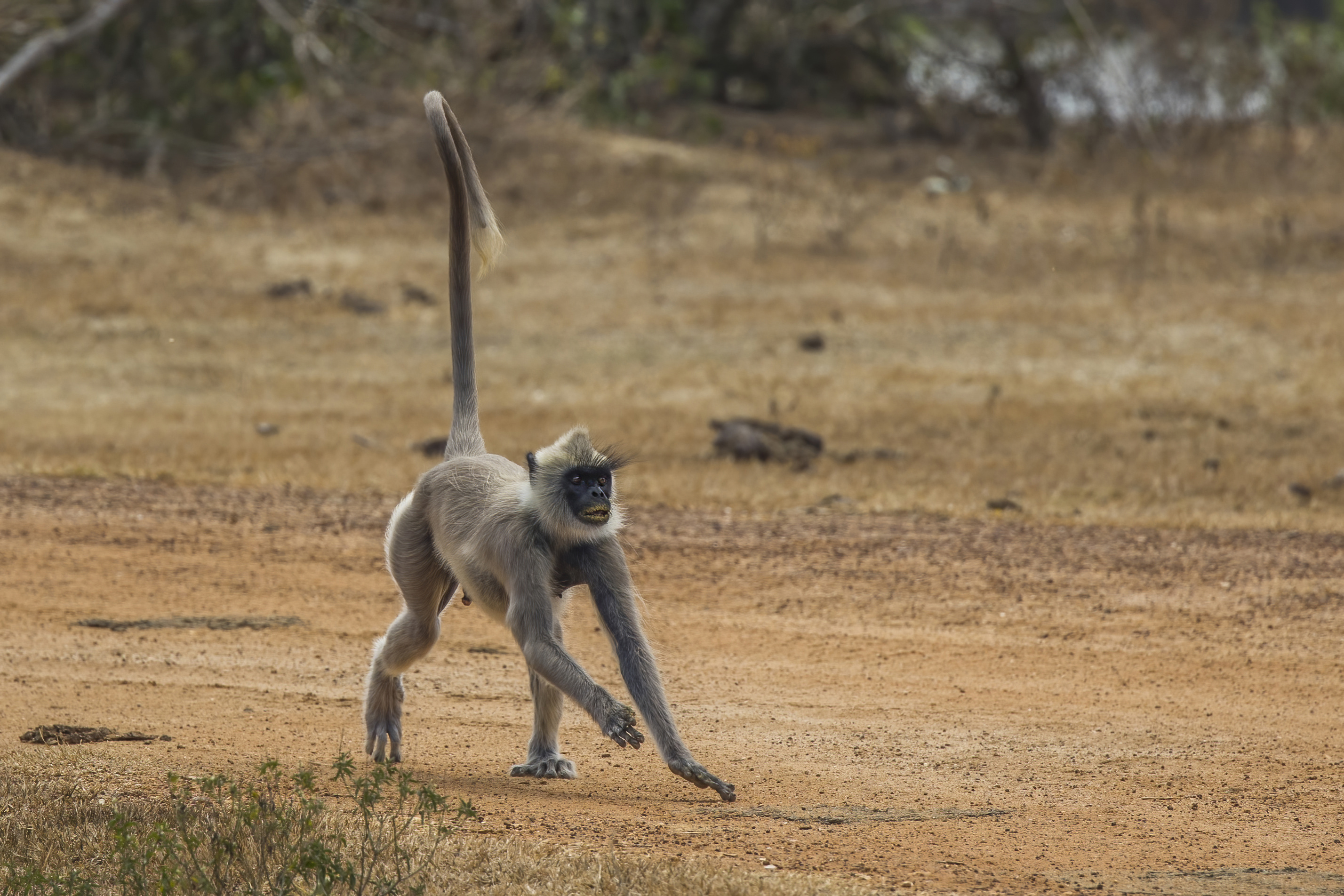
S. p. thersites male running, Sri Lanka

== Physical characteristics ==
- Head to body length = 55 to 80 cm (22 to 31 in)
- Tail length = 75 to 90 cm (30 to 35 in)
- Weight of an adult = 11 to 20 kg (24 to 44 lb)

Males are larger than females. The average adult weighs 12.8 kg (28 lb) with a head-to-body length of 61.1 cm (24.1 in). The Indian subspecies is somewhat larger bodied than the Sri Lankan which typically weigh between 6.8 and 13.4 kg (15 and 30 lb). Despite its somewhat slighter size there, the tufted gray langur is the largest native primate on Sri Lanka based on average sizes.

In Sri Lankan subspecies, dorsal area gray to brownish gray in color, getting darker with the age. Underparts are light grayish. Short whitish beard and sideburns present. The hairs of the crown form a distinct pointed tuft or crest, that meets at a central point, hence the name. Black eyebrows project outward. Head scarcely paler or not paler than back. Hands and feet are same color as limbs.

== Habitat ==
In Sri Lanka, tufted gray langurs are abundant in dry zone forests and also within human dwellings. Many numerous troops are found at archeologically important areas, such as Polonnaruwa, Dambulla, Anuradhapura, and Sigiriya. The animal is also found in southward of the island, such as Hambantota, Yala National Park, and Tissamaharama.

== Ecology ==
Generally a shy animal, tufted gray langurs are partially arboreal, semi-terrestrial and diurnal in habit. They always find a way to come to the ground when there is no danger. Unlike the canopy-dweeling sympatric relatives, they are rather common in urban settlements, found in gardens, and other large fruit trees such as Mangifera indica, and Artocarpus heterophyllus.

=== Diet ===
Mostly folivorous, tufted gray langurs are fond of eating anything vegetarian. They are known to eat fruits and seeds. Langurs are differ from leaf monkeys, where latter is known to eat mature, fleshy fruits, and langurs are like to eat partially drier fibrous fruits. The leaves of Drypetes sepiaria, Dimocarpus longan, Ficus microcarpa, Holoptelea integrifolia, and fruits and seeds of Hydnocarpus venenata, Ficus arnottiana, Macaranga peltata are known to eat by Sri Lankan subspecies.

Sometimes, the troops can be seen near the water bodies, where they feed on Nelumbo nucifera seeds. Insects and everygreen leaves are eaten when others foods are less abundant and bark is only eaten when there is no other food available. The Gray Langur's diet is high in strychnine, which can be harmful to animals. Therefore, it will commonly ingest the gum of the Sterculia urens to counteract the effects. This gum is marketed in England as a prescription laxative known as Normacol.

=== Predators ===
Leopards, and Black eagles are the major predators of the tufted gray langurs. Other than them, siblings and sub adults are attacked by tigers, dhole, gray wolves, mugger crocodile, and Indian rock python occasionally.

== Behavior ==
Tufted gray langurs are mainly philopatric, meaning they stick to their territories. A single troop may include about 20 to 50 individuals. Large troops are led by both large male-female combinations, whereas small troops are governed by an alpha male. Females quickly attain their heat and mate with new alpha male, even when they are not ready for the reproduction in the natural estrous cycle.

Female langur gives birth to a single offspring or rarely twins, after a 6 months of gestation period. After birth, offspring is attach to the mother about 3 months with all the nourishment and other protection. Sub adult males and other males usually spend the time with searching for foods, rivals with neighboring alpha males, and protecting the troop. Females spend the time with feeding the young, grooming them, and even play with the young.

Tufted gray langurs communicate with many different ways such as barks, grunts, whoops, whistles and howls. The cough like voice is used for giving tension, and whistling for the contact loss with the troop. The tufted gray langur monkey's superior eyesight and ability to sit atop high trees allows it to spot predators easily. Researchers have noted that this species will often sit next to herds of the spotted deer and notify them when a predator is approaching. Additionally, the langur will often drop fruit from tall trees, which the Spotted Deer will then feed on. In return, the Spotted Deer's excellent sense of smell allows it to detect predators early on and warn the langur that something may be approaching.

== Conservation ==
According to IUCN Red List, tufted gray langur is listed as a "Near Threatened" species, due to decline of populations in recent years. Hunting and habitat destruction also affect for the declining of the species. Some people also fond of eating langur meat in some parts of Sri Lanka. Very few occasions are recorded of being captured for pets. Numerous conservations projects are undertaken in both Sri Lankan and Indian forests and sanctuaries.

Both subspecies thersites and priam are listed as "Near Threatened".
