= Kashmir gray langur =

Conservation status
- Endangered (IUCN 3.1)
- CITES Appendix I

Scientific classification
- Kingdom: Animalia
- Phylum: Chordata
- Class: Mammalia
- Infraclass: Placentalia
- Order: Primates
- Family: Cercopithecidae
- Genus: Semnopithecus
- Species: S. ajax

Binomial name
- Semnopithecus ajax Pocock, 1928
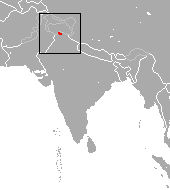
- Kashmir gray langur range

Species of Old World monkey

The Kashmir gray langur (Semnopithecus ajax) is an Old World monkey, one of the langur species. It is a leaf-eating monkey.

It has been reported from Jammu and Kashmir and Himachal Pradesh in northwestern India but evidence indicates it only occurs in the Chamba Valley in Himachal Pradesh. Because of its restricted range, fragmented population and threats from human agriculture and development activities it is listed as Endangered in the IUCN Red List. In Pakistan it occurs in Machiara National Park.

It was formerly considered a subspecies of Semnopithecus entellus and is one of several Semnopithecus species named after characters from The Iliad, along with Semnopithecus hector and Semnopithecus priam.

== Ecology and behaviour ==
It is arboreal and diurnal, and lives in temperate and alpine forests. It lives at the highest elevation of any non-human primate in the world and is found in forests at elevations ranging from 1,500 to 4,733 m (4,921 to 15,528 ft).

The birthing season for the Kashmir gray langur runs from January through June, although almost half of all infants are born in March. The infants are weaned at a higher age than most Asian colobines. While most Asian colobines wean their young within the first year, Kashmir gray langurs wean their young on average at 25 months. This is apparently due to nutritional constraints, since monkeys in poorer sites wean their young at an older age. The interbirth interval for females is about 2.4 years. Alloparental care occurs in Kashmir gray langur for up to 5 months. Males are usually protective of infants, but infanticide occasionally occurs.

Although most Asian colobine groups comprise only a single adult male and multiple females, multimale groups are known to occur within Semnopithecus species. In Kashmir gray langurs, multimale groups may include as many as five adult males. Females initiate copulation by soliciting a male, but not all solicitations result in copulation.
