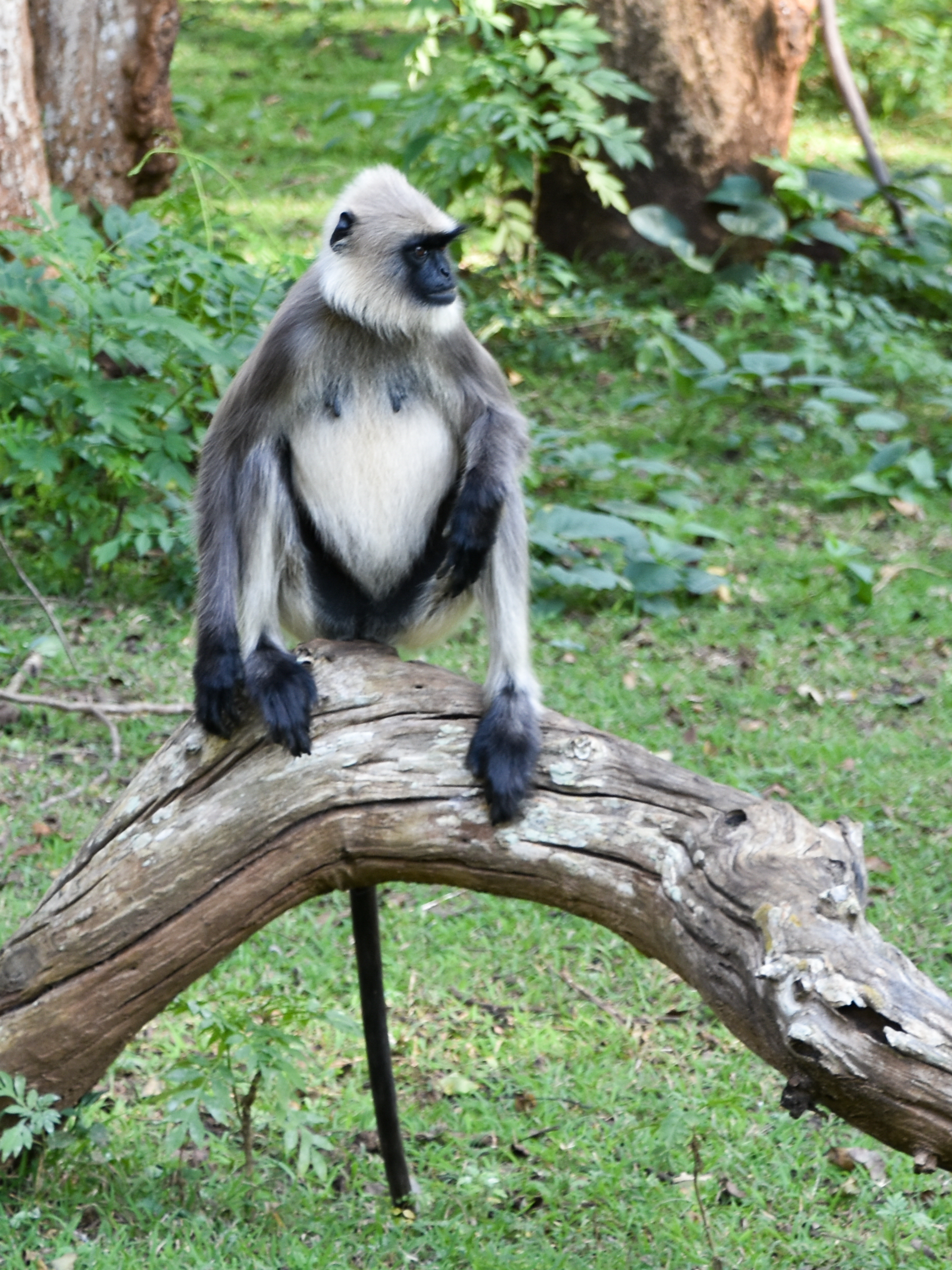

Conservation status
- Least Concern (IUCN 3.1)
- CITES Appendix I

Scientific classification
- Kingdom: Animalia
- Phylum: Chordata
- Class: Mammalia
- Infraclass: Placentalia
- Order: Primates
- Family: Cercopithecidae
- Genus: Semnopithecus
- Species: S. hypoleucos

Binomial name
- Semnopithecus hypoleucos Blyth, 1841
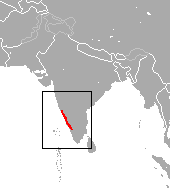
- Black-footed gray langur range

Synonyms
- Semnopithecus dussumieri

= Black-footed gray langur =

Species of Old World monkey

The black-footed gray langur (Semnopithecus hypoleucos) is an Old World monkey, one of the species of langurs. Found in southern India, this, like other gray langurs, is a leaf-eating monkey.

== Taxonomy ==
The black-footed gray langur was previously considered to be a subspecies of Semnopithecus entellus. Research in 2003 may indicate that it is a subspecies of Semnopithecus dussumieri. Some experts believe that the species may be a naturally occurring hybrid of Semnopithecus johnii and Semnopithecus dussumieri.

== Distribution ==
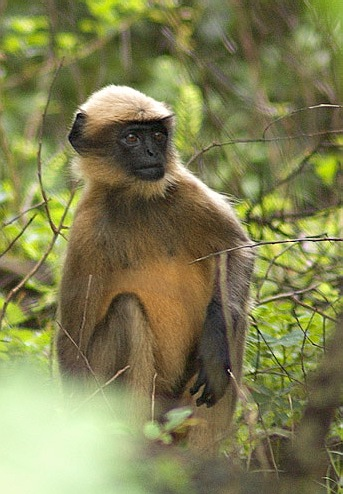
Juvenile

The black-footed gray langur is distributed throughout south-western India (Goa, Karnataka and Kerala), but is centred on the Western Ghats. Its total range is around 35,000 km^{2} (14,000 sq mi), with the species living inside and outside of protected areas.
