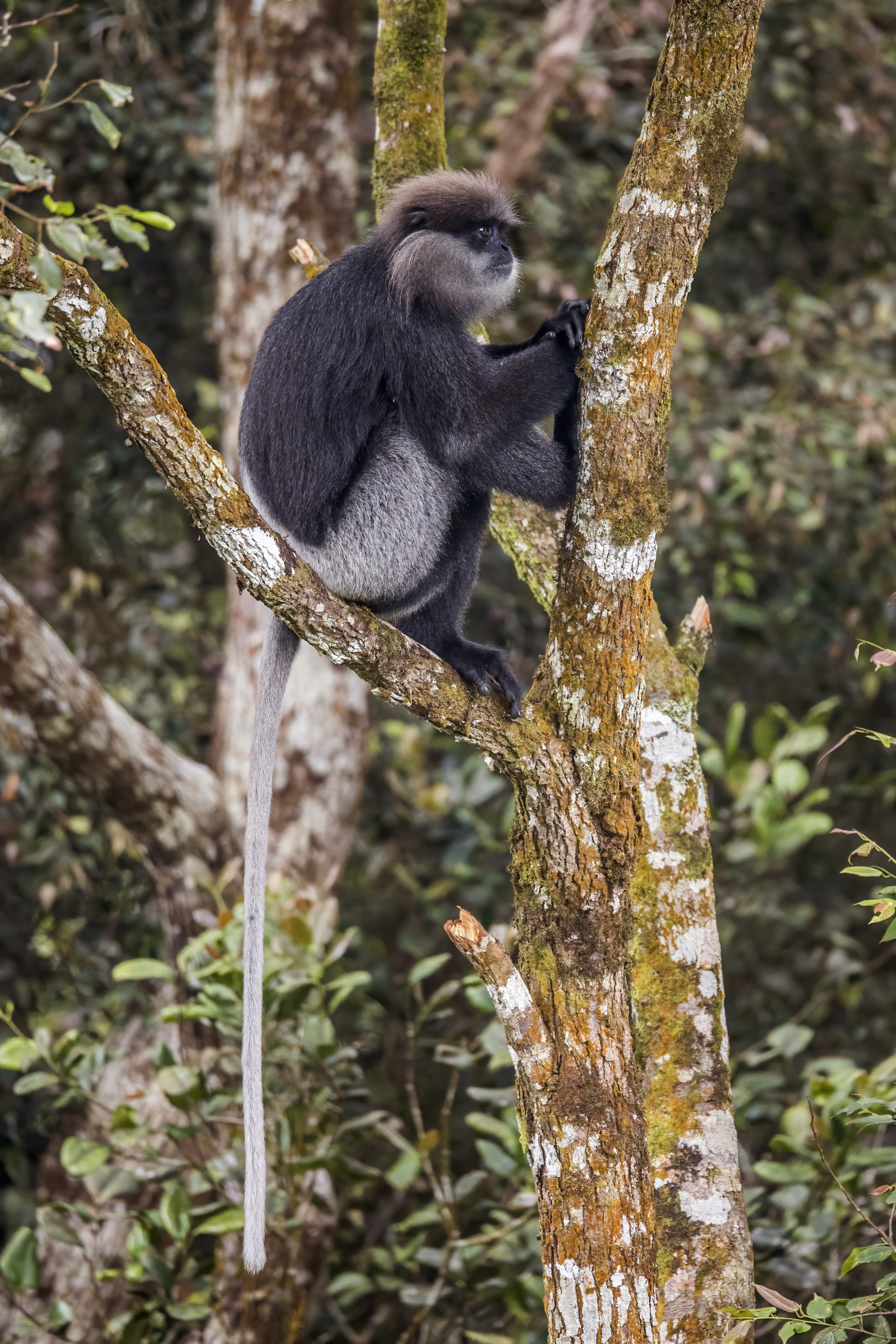
- Semnopithecus vetulus vetulus

Conservation status
- Endangered (IUCN 3.1)

Scientific classification
- Kingdom: Animalia
- Phylum: Chordata
- Class: Mammalia
- Infraclass: Placentalia
- Order: Primates
- Family: Cercopithecidae
- Genus: Semnopithecus
- Species: S. vetulus

Binomial name
- Semnopithecus vetulus (Erxleben, 1777)

Subspecies
- Semnopithecus vetulus monticola Groves, 2001; Semnopithecus vetulus nestor Bennett, 1833; Semnopithecus vetulus philbricki Groves, 2001; Semnopithecus vetulus vetulus Erxleben, 1777
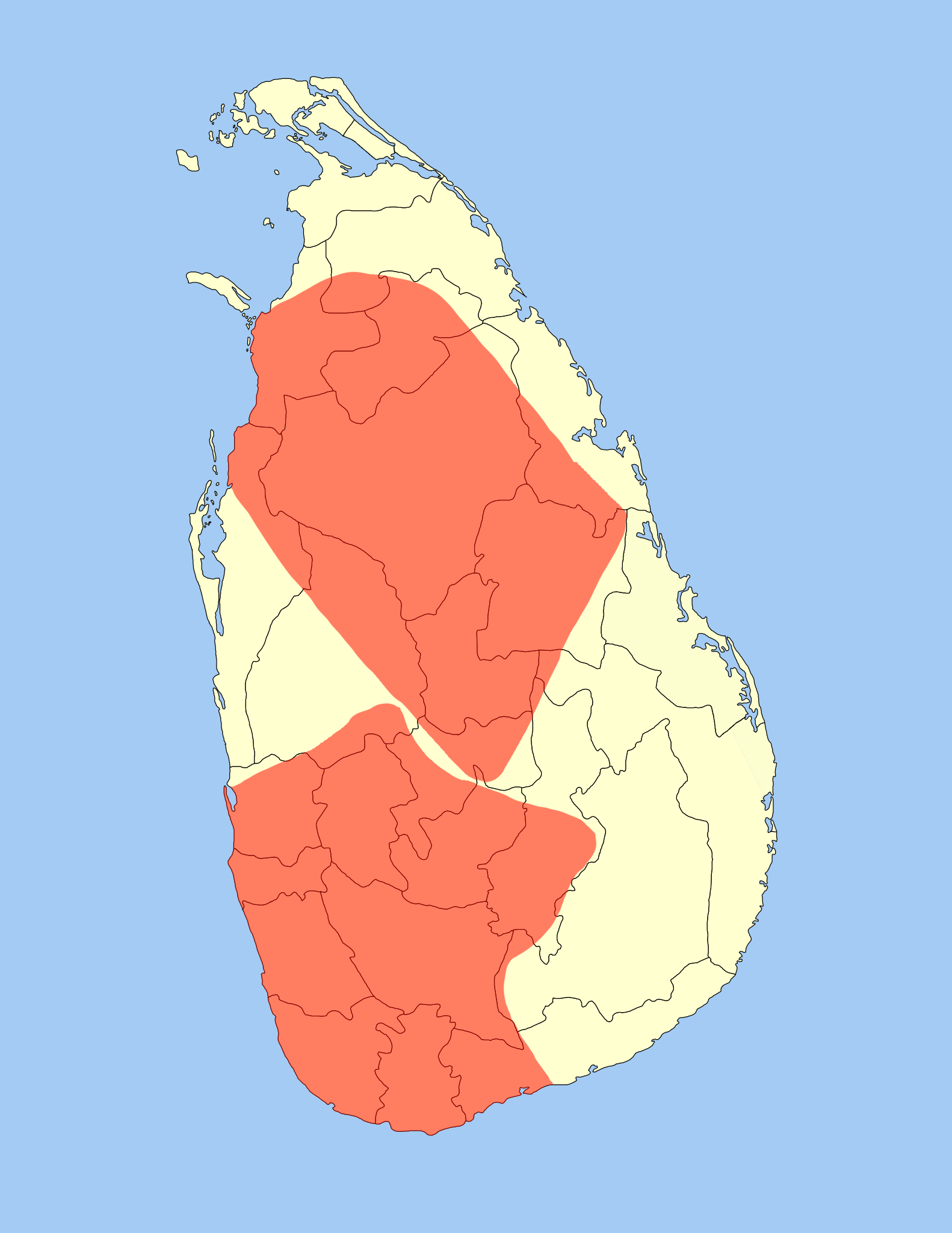
- Purple-faced langur range

Synonyms
- Trachypithecus vetulus

= Purple-faced langur =

Species of Old World monkey

The purple-faced langur (Semnopithecus vetulus), also known as the purple-faced leaf monkey, is a species of Old World monkey that is endemic to Sri Lanka. The animal is a long-tailed arboreal species, identified by a mostly brown appearance, dark face (with paler lower face) and a very shy nature. The species was once highly prevalent, found in suburban Colombo and the "wet zone" villages (areas with high temperatures and high humidity throughout the year, whilst rain deluges occur during the monsoon seasons), but rapid urbanization has led to a significant decrease in the population level of the monkeys. It had traditionally been classified within the genus Trachypithecus but was moved to the genus Semnopithecus based on DNA evidence indicating that is it more closely related to the gray langurs.

In Sinhala, it is known as ශ්‍රී ලංකා කළු වඳුරා [kalu ʋaⁿd̪uraː] (Sri Lanka black monkey).

== Description ==
In the purple-faced langur, males are usually larger than females. Males measure 50 to 67.1 cm (19.7 to 26.4 in) in head-body length with a tail of 67 to 85.1 cm (26.4 to 33.5 in). Females possess a head-body length 44.7 to 60 cm (17.6 to 23.6 in) and tail length of 58.9 to 82 cm (23.2 to 32.3 in). The pelage may generally vary from blackish to grayish. The species tends to have whitish to gray short 'trousers' rounded off by purplish-black faces with white sideburns. Part of the back is covered with whitish fur, and tail is also furred with black and white mixed colors. The feet and hands are also purplish-black in color. Size varies among the subspecies. Typically adults will weigh somewhere between 3.1 and 11.4 kg (6.8 and 25.1 lb), averaging about 7.08 kg (15.6 lb). The smallest subspecies (S. v. nestor) commonly weighs between 3.8 and 6 kg (8.4 and 13.2 lb). Average weight from other subspecies has been recorded up to 7.8 kg (17 lb) in females and 8.5 kg (19 lb) in males with some exceptionally big langurs weighing up to perhaps 18 kg (40 lb). Among the primates that live in Sri Lanka, it is somewhat smaller than the tufted gray langur despite leading males of the group of purple-faced langurs often being larger than the tufted gray langur that lived together in the habitats. In the subspecies known as the "bear monkey" (S. v. monitcola) usually has a darker coat and usually sports a heavy mustache. In this species, the hair of crown directed backwards throughout, not radiating. it lacks the crest of tufted gray langurs and has hair on the crown no longer than on temples and nape. Purple-faced langurs have a rump that is pure white or whitish gray.

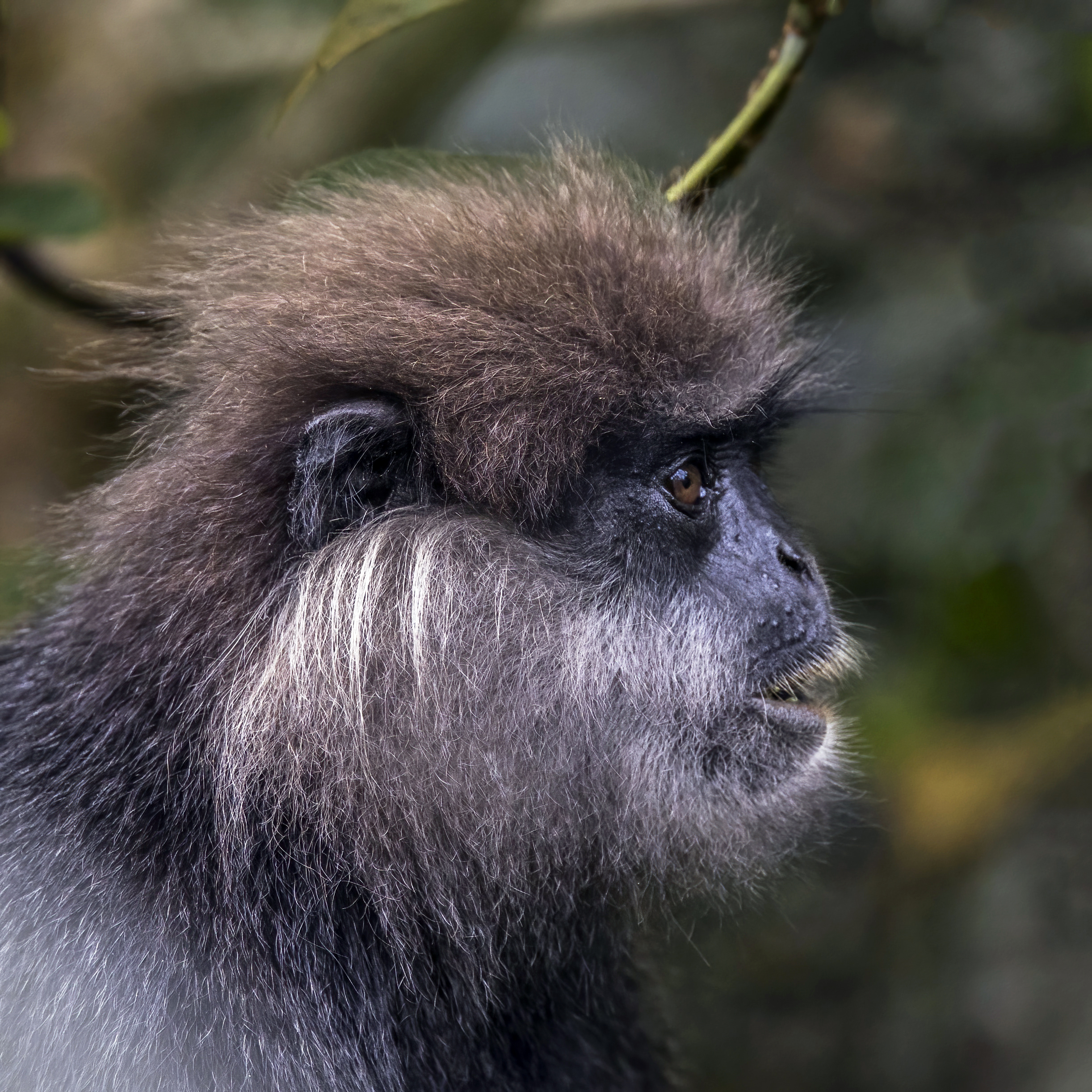
S.v.vetulus

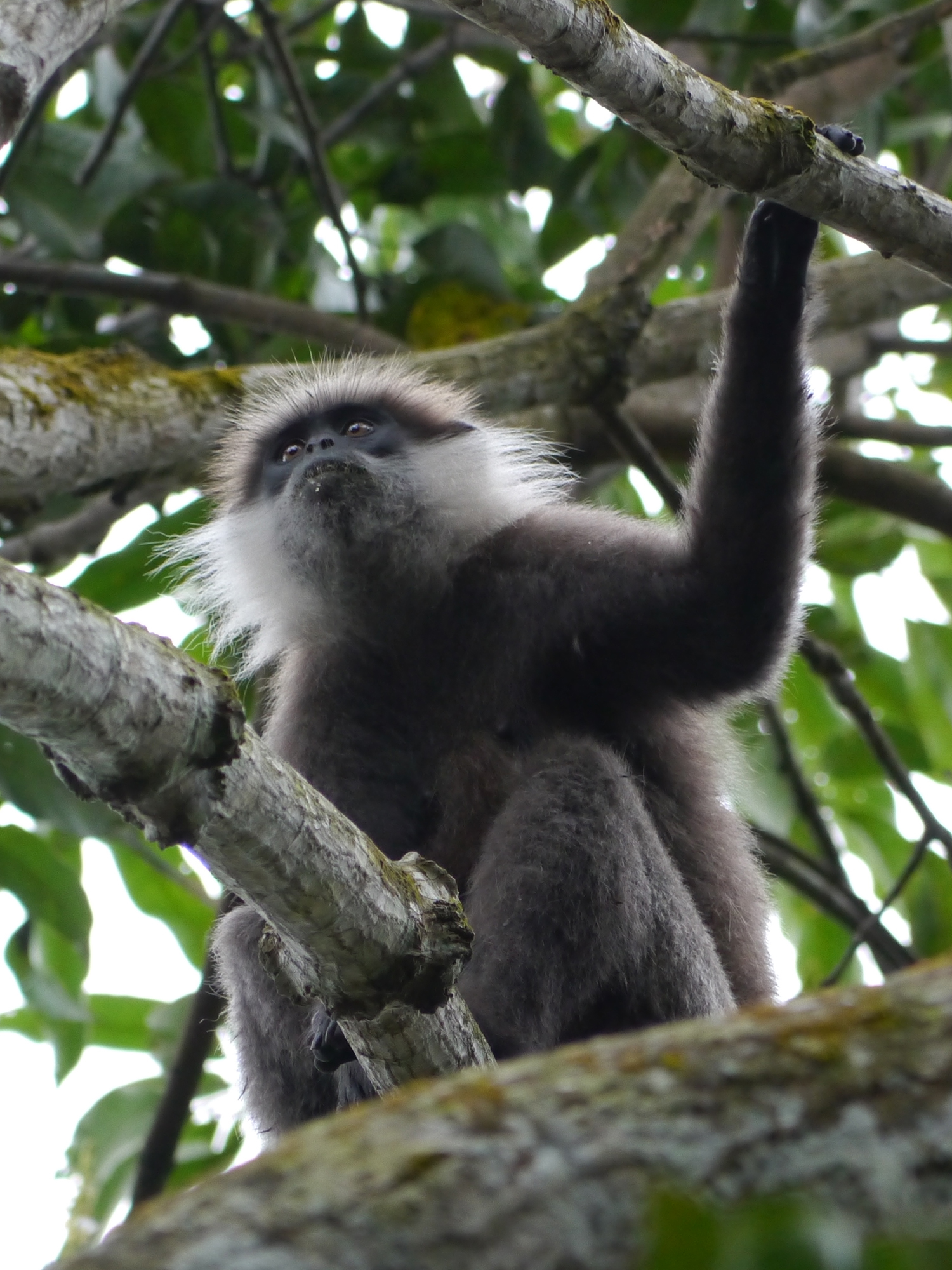
S.v.nestor

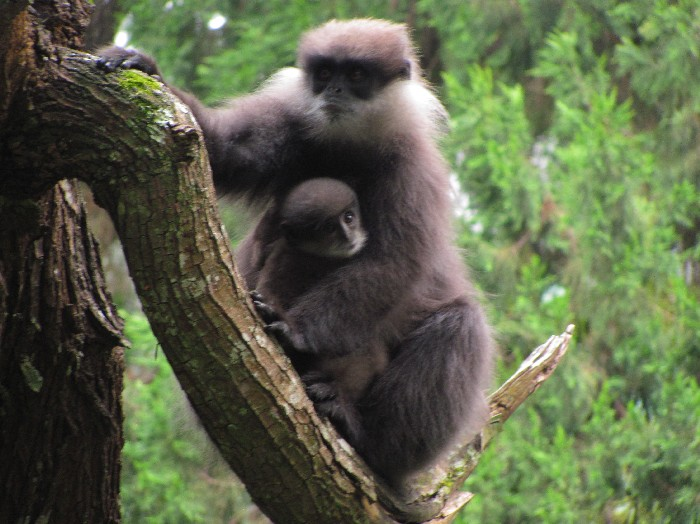
S.v.monticola

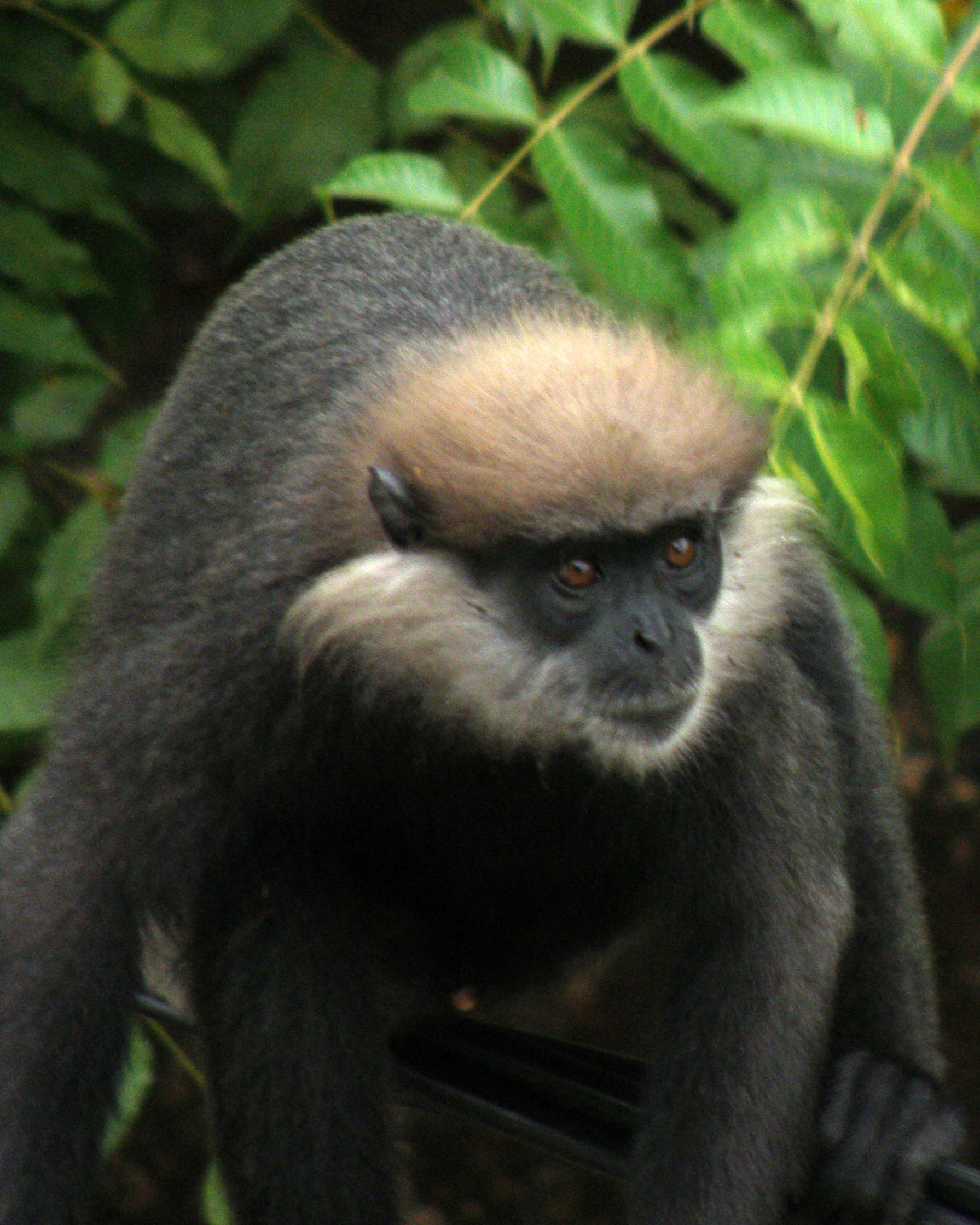
S. v. philbricki

=== Subspecies ===
According to the Mammals of Sri Lanka, the 4 subspecies are recognized as follows.

- Southern lowland wetzone purple-faced langur, Semnopithecus vetulus vetulus – "Color varies greatly. Black upper torso, light brown cap, well defined silvery rump patch that extends to legs. Prominent white whiskers. Tail is also white colored. Many white morphs are observed in this subspecies. They can be all-white to partly white leucistic."
- Western purple-faced langur or north lowland wetzone purple-faced langur, Semnopithecus vetulus nestor – "It is the smallest of all subspecies. Upper torso dark grayish brown with light grayish brown rump patch, darker grayish brown legs and white cap."
- Dryzone purple-faced langur, Semnopithecus vetulus philbricki – "Largest subspecies. Grayish brown torso, ill-defined grayish rump patch, dark cap. Prominent white cheeks with tufts. Exceptionally long slimy tail."
- Montane purple-faced langur or Bear Monkey, Semnopithecus vetulus monticola – "Dark gray brown coat. Large but ill-defined grayish rump patch. Prominent white cheek tufts, light brownish gray cap. Fur long and shaggy due to habitat they live is cold."

All four recognizable subspecies exhibit different cranial and pelage characteristics, as well as body size. The western purple-faced langur is one of the 25 most endangered primates in the world. Most groups of langurs contain only one adult male.

A possible subspecies called Semnopithecus vetulus harti is recognized, but not yet given validity. This subspecies is known from some skins found from Jaffna peninsula and north of the Vavuniya. Uniquely, this subspecies has yellowish golden hair on its scalp and a golden sheen to its fur. Other than these differences, anatomy and all the other aspects are similar to the Semnopithecus vetulus philbricki.

Although traditionally classified within the genus Trachypithecus based on morphological similarities, DNA and vocal evidence suggests that the purple-faced langur actually is more closely related to the gray langurs of the genus Semnopithecus.

== Habitat and status ==
The purple-faced langur is found in closed canopy forests in Sri Lanka's mountains and the southwestern part of the country, known as the "wet zone". Only 19% of Sri Lanka consists of forested areas. This habitat has decreased from 80% in 1980 to ~25% in 2001. Currently, this range has decreased to below 3%. The range consists of the most densely populated lowland rainforest areas of Sri Lanka. Deforestation has resulted in the langurs home ranges to be exposed to direct sunlight. Purple-faced langurs are most often found in small and widely scattered groups. Ninety percent of the langurs range, now consists of human populated areas. Populations are critically low within and between sites. Threats to this species include infringement on range by croplands, grazing, changing agriculture, road production, soil loss/erosion and deforestation, poisoning from prevention of crop raiding, and hunting for medicine and food.

Its range has constricted greatly in the face of human encroachment, although it can still be seen in Sinharaja, Kitulgala, Kandalama, Mihintale, in the mountains at Horton Plains National Park or in the rainforest near the city of Galle.

== Behaviour and ecology ==
=== Diet ===
The purple-faced langur is mostly folivorous, but will also feed on fruits, flowers, and seeds. While they normally avoid human habitations, fruit such as jak (Artocarpus heterophyllus), rambutan (Nephelium lappaceum), banana (Musa balbisiana), and mango (Mangifera indica) may contribute up to 50% to their diet in cultivated areas. In the wild, food such as the fruits of Dimocarpus longan and Drypetes sepiaria are taken. Purple-faced langur digestion is adapted to derive the majority of required nutrients and energy from complex carbohydrates found in leaves, with the help of specialized stomach bacteria. Where the species' diet is currently heavily dependent cultivated fruits, the ability to derive sufficient nutrition may become impaired. Seasonal availability of fruit may serve to increase this effect.

Semnopithecus vetulus feed on a less diverse diet than S. priam, with a greater proportion of leaves. Food plants that have been identified include Holoptelea integrifolia, Hydnocarpus venenata, Macaranga peltata, Manilkara hexandra, Mikania scandens, Mischodon zeylanica, Pterospermum suberifolium, Tetrameles nudiflora, Vitex altissima, and Wrightia angustifolia. The purple-faced langur was found to be dominated by tufted gray langurs in mixed feeding groups.

=== Communication ===
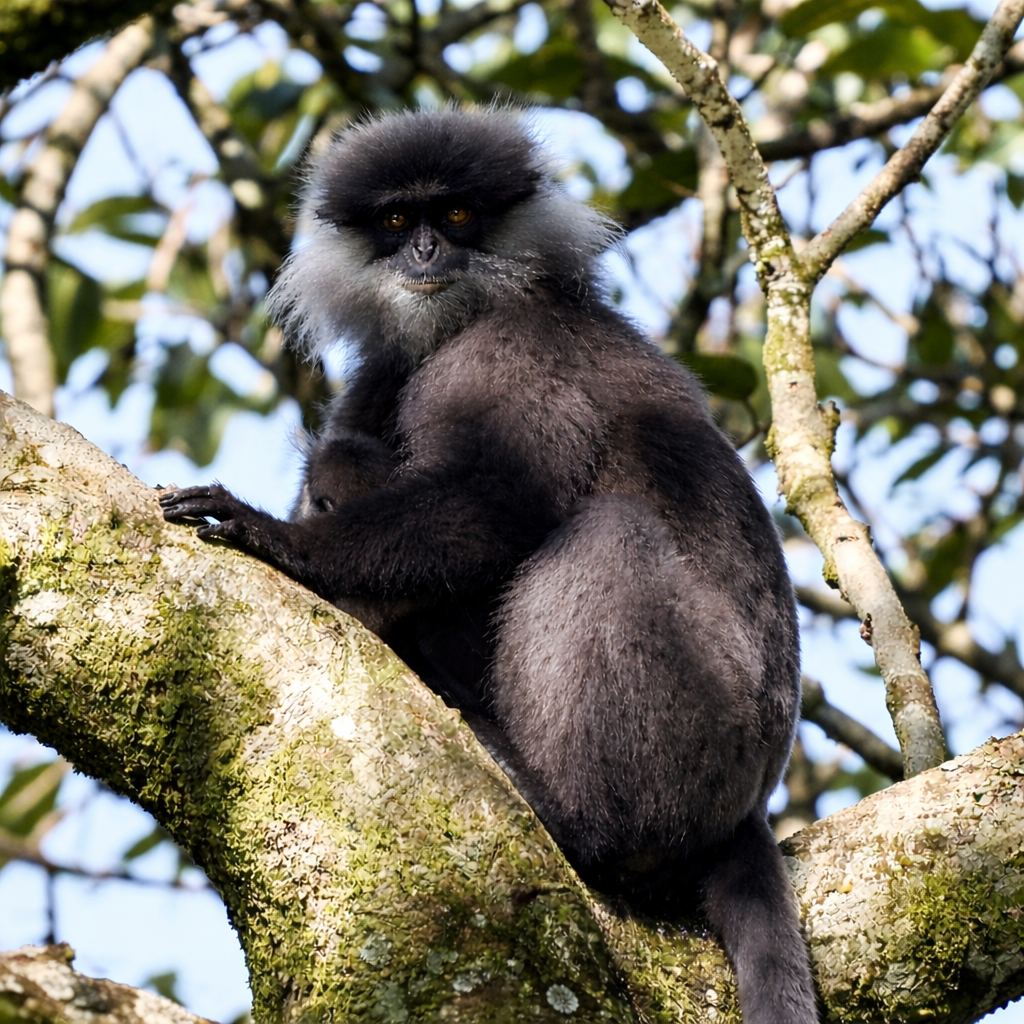
Female with baby in Riverston, Matale

Loud calls are often used to distinguish between individual purple-faced langurs. The elements of a call fall into three categories: harsh barks, whoops, and residuals. Individuals can be differentiated by the number of phrases and residuals within a call. Calls occur more often in the morning mostly stimulated by neighboring groups and territorial battles. More calls occur during sunny periods than cloudy. The fewest calls occur in the evening. Daytime calls usually aid in the defense of home ranges. The loud barking call, particularly of the highland form, can be mistaken for the roar of a predator such as a leopard. Calls of the purple-faced langur differ from those of any of the subspecies. Environmental characters impact call times as well as anthropogenic disturbance. Vocalization can be used to alert members of predators, attract mates, defend territory, and locate group members. Vocalization is extremely important for the use in conservation especially because they are very difficult to observe directly. Adult males are the most vocal among the entire group. Defensive whooping calls are also accompanied by intense visual and locomotive displays. Vocalizations are also helpful in determining taxonomic identification. Based on alarm calls issued in response to these and known predators of the similar tufted gray langur, the main potential predators of this species are likely to be leopards followed infrequently perhaps by Indian pythons and mugger crocodile. For young or infirm langurs, black eagles, spot-bellied eagle-owls and possibly other larger birds of prey are perhaps not infrequently a threat. Monitor lizards may also feed on purple-faced langurs (possibly through scavenging or picking off the young or sickly).

== Conservation ==
Some conservation strategies consist of improving management of the already protected areas as well as locate and protect new areas and corridors within ranges. Efforts to help increase populations may help survival. It would be beneficial to lower human-langur conflicts. Rope bridges could be established for langurs to move between ranges safely, which may decrease the crossing of power lines and roads. Replanting pine plantations with native species exploited by these langurs, could possibly increase its preferred habitat as well. Public education of conservation to the local people emphasizing compassion and kindness as well as explaining the importance and necessity of these mammals to the ecosystems overall biodiversity.
