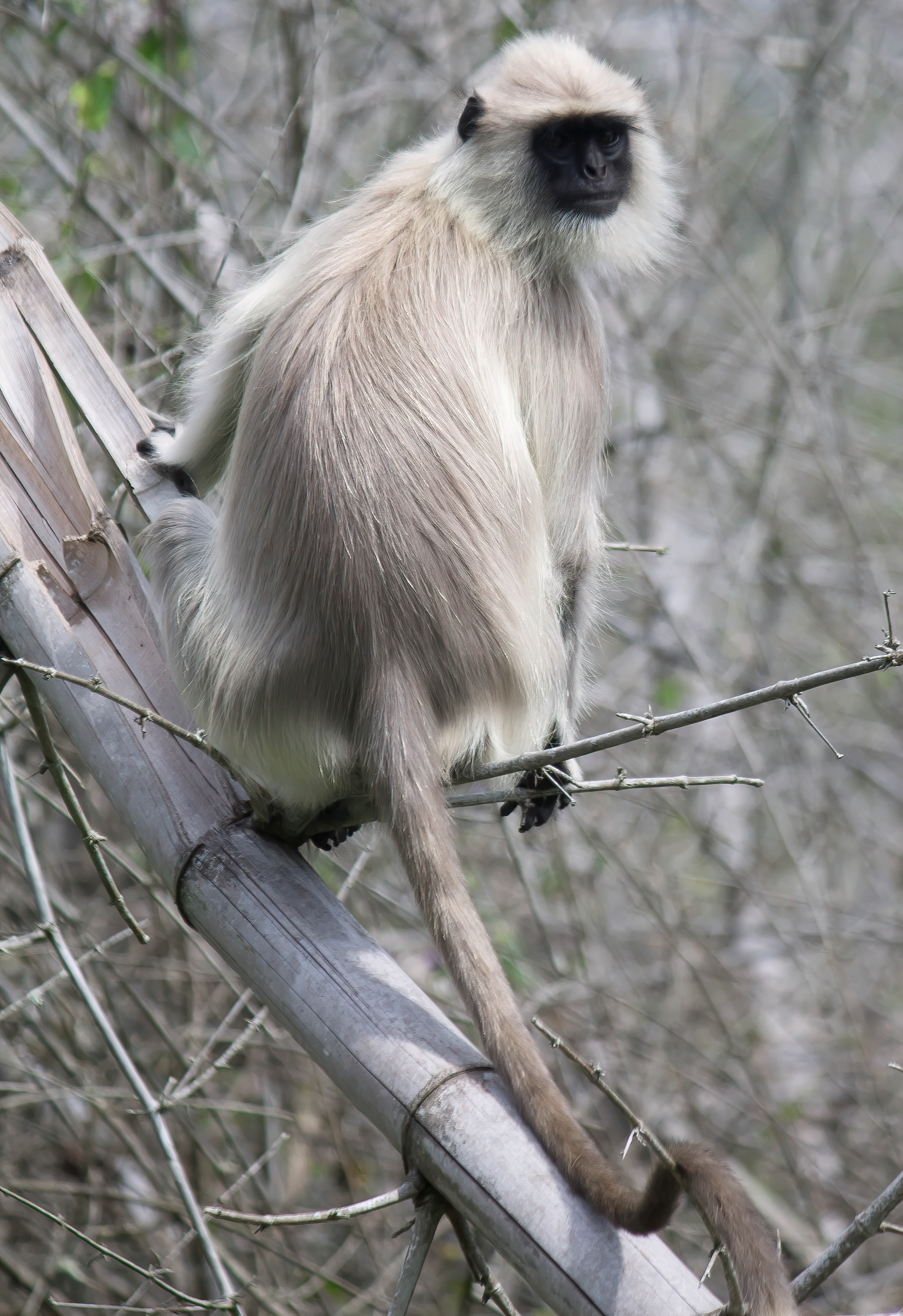
- Gray langur in Mudumalai, Tamil Nadu

Scientific classification
- Kingdom: Animalia
- Phylum: Chordata
- Class: Mammalia
- Order: Primates
- Family: Cercopithecidae
- Subfamily: Colobinae
- Tribe: Presbytini
- Genus: Semnopithecus; Desmarest, 1822

Type species
- Simia entellus Dufresne, 1797

Species
- S. schistaceus S. ajax S. hector S. entellus S. hypoleucos S. johnii S. priam S. vetulus

= Semnopithecus =

Genus of Old World monkeys

Semnopithecus is a genus of Old World monkeys native to the Indian subcontinent, with all species with the exception of two being commonly known as gray langurs. Historically only the species Semnopithecus entellus was recognized, but since about 2001 additional species have been recognized. The taxonomy has been in flux, but currently eight species are recognized.

Members of the genus Semnopithecus are terrestrial, inhabiting forest, open lightly wooded habitats, and urban areas on the Indian subcontinent. Most species are found at low to moderate altitudes, but the Nepal gray langur and Kashmir gray langur occur up to 4,000 m (13,000 ft) in the Himalayas.

== Characteristics ==
These langurs are largely gray (some more yellowish), with a black face and ears. Externally, the various species mainly differ in the darkness of the hands and feet, the overall color and the presence or absence of a crest. Typically all north Indian gray langurs have their tail tips looping towards their head during a casual walk whereas all south Indian and Sri Lankan gray langurs have an inverted "U" shape or a "S" tail carriage pattern. There are also significant variations in the size depending on the sex, with the male always larger than the female. The head-and-body length is from 51 to 79 cm (20 to 31 in). Their tails, at 69 to 102 cm (27 to 40 in) are always longer than their bodies. Langurs from the southern part of their range are smaller than those from the north. At 26.5 kg (58 lb), the heaviest langur ever recorded was a male Nepal gray langur. The larger gray langurs are rivals for the largest species of monkey found in Asia. The average weight of gray langurs is 18 kg (40 lb) in the males and 11 kg (24 lb) in the females.

Langurs mostly walk quadrupedally and spend half of their time on the ground and the other half in trees. They will also make bipedal hops, climbing and descending supports with the body upright, and leaps. Langurs can leap 3.6–4.7 m (12–15 ft) horizontally and 10.7–12.2 m (35–40 ft) in descending.

== Taxonomy ==
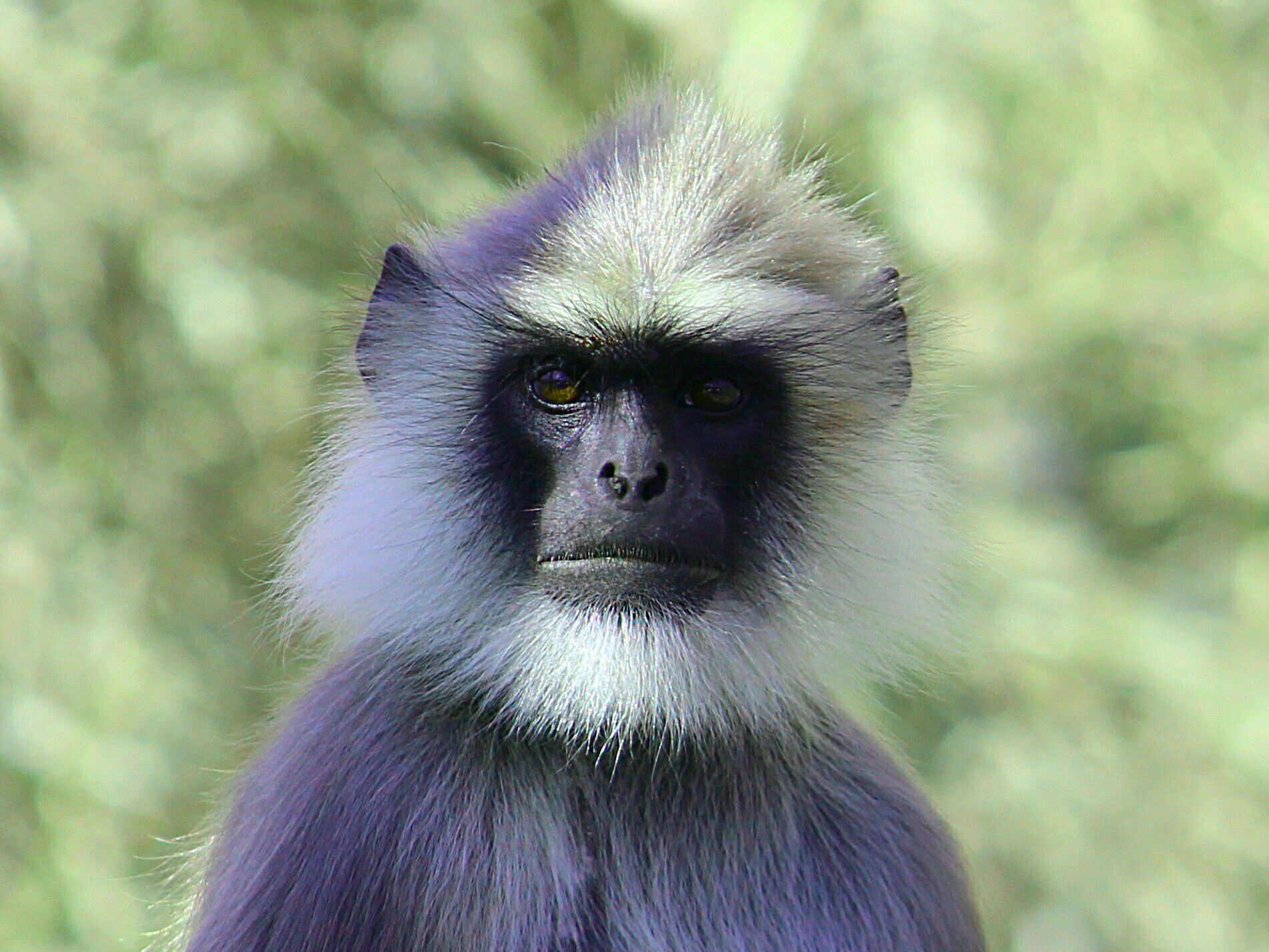
Young gray langur at Nagarhole National Park, Mysore

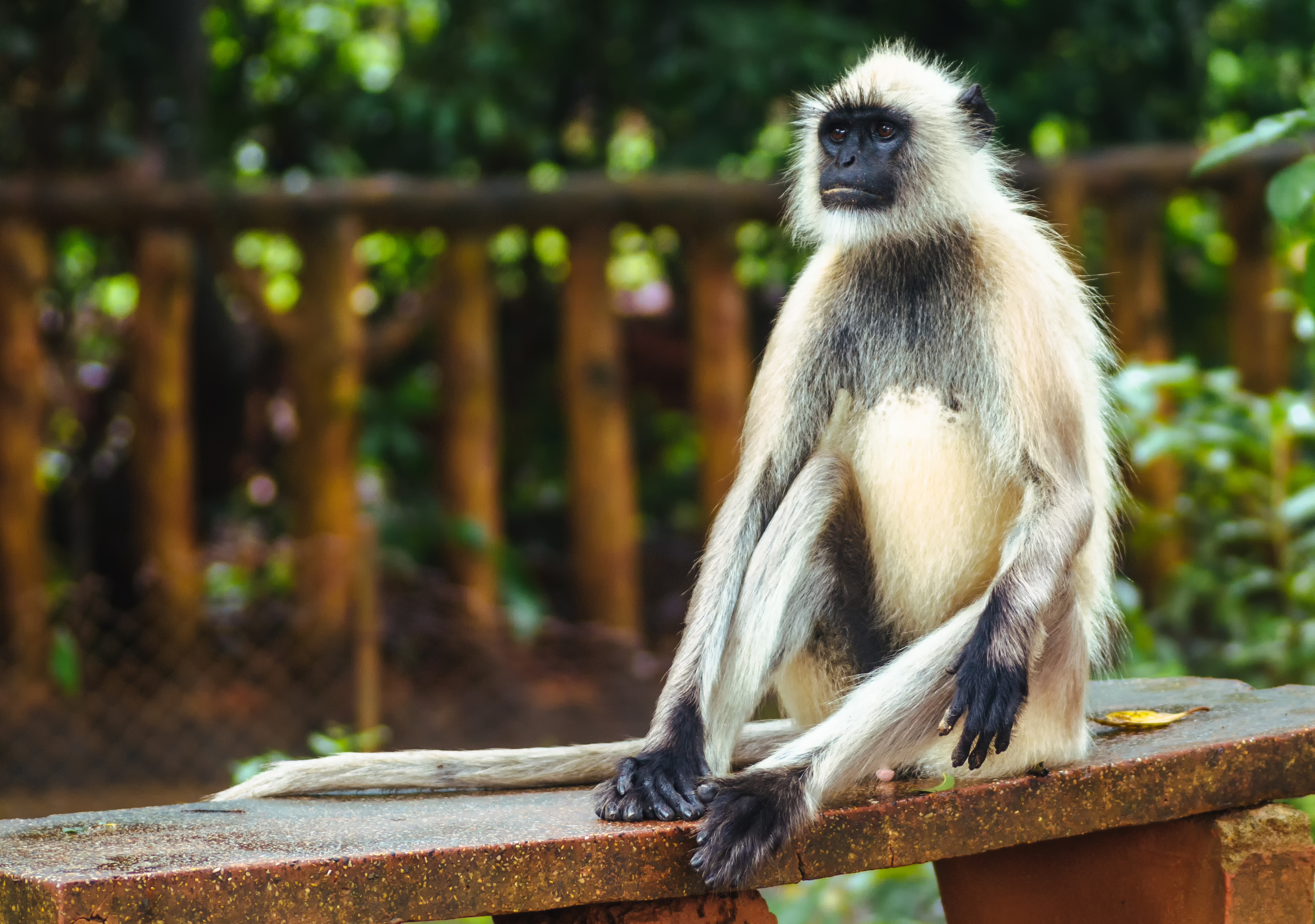
Hanuman langur in Nandankanan Zoological Park in Bhubaneshwar

Traditionally, only Semnopithecus entellus was recognized as a species, the remainder all being treated as subspecies. In 2001, it was proposed that seven species should be recognized. This was followed in Mammal Species of the World in 2005, though several of the seven species intergrade, and alternative treatments exist where only two species (a northern and a southern) are recognized. Phylogenetic evidence supports at least three species: a north Indian, a south Indian and a Sri Lankan one.

It has been suggested that the Semnopithecus priam thersites is worthy of treatment as a species rather than a subspecies, but at present this is based on limited evidence. During a study based on external morphology and ecological niche modelling in Peninsular India six main types were found, but continued to label all as subspecies. Coat color is highly variable, possible due to phenotypic plasticity and therefore of questionable value in species delimitation.

It has been suggested that Trachypithecus should be considered only a subgenus of Semnopithecus. If maintaining the two as separate monophyletic genera, the purple-faced langur and Nilgiri langur belong in Semnopithecus instead of their former genus Trachypithecus. At present it is unclear where the T. pileatus species group (consisting of the capped langur, Shortridge's langur and Gee's golden langur) belongs, as available mtDNA data place it in Semnopithecus, while Y chromosome data place it in Trachypithecus. A possible explanation for this is that the T. pileatus species group is the result of fairly recent hybridization between Semnopithecus and Trachypithecus.

As of 2005, the authors of Mammal Species of the World recognized the following seven Semnopithecus species

- Nepal gray langur Semnopithecus schistaceus
- Kashmir gray langur Semnopithecus ajax
- Tarai gray langur Semnopithecus hector
- Northern plains gray langur Semnopithecus entellus
- Black-footed gray langur Semnopithecus hypoleucos
- Southern plains gray langur Semnopithecus dussumieri
- Tufted gray langur Semnopithecus priam

Results of analysis of mitochondrial cytochrome b gene and two nuclear DNA-encoded genes of several colobine species revealed that Nilgiri and purple-faced langurs cluster with gray langur, while Trachypithecus species form a distinct clade. Since then, two other species have been moved from Trachypithecus to Semnopithecus:

- Purple-faced langur Semnopithecus vetulus
- Nilgiri langur Semnopithecus johnii

In addition, Semnopithecus dussumieri has been determined to be invalid. Most of the range that had been considered S. dussumieri is now considered S. entellus.

Thus the current generally accepted species within the genus Semnopithecus are:

Genus Semnopithecus – Desmarest, 1822 – eight species
Common name	Scientific name and subspecies	Range	Size and ecology	IUCN status and estimated population
Black-footed gray langur	S. hypoleucos Blyth, 1841 Three subspecies: S. h. achates; S. h. hypoleucos; S. h. iulus	Southern India	Size: 41–78 cm (16–31 in) long, plus 69–108 cm (27–43 in) tail Habitat: Forest and shrubland Diet: Leaves, fruit, and flowers	LC Unknown
Kashmir gray langur	S. ajax (Pocock, 1928)	Himalayas	Size: 41–78 cm (16–31 in) long, plus 69–108 cm (27–43 in) tail Habitat: Forest Diet: Leaves, bark, and seeds	EN 1,400–1,500
Nepal gray langur	S. schistaceus Hodgson, 1840	Himalayas	Size: 41–78 cm (16–31 in) long, plus 69–108 cm (27–43 in) tail Habitat: Forest, shrubland, and rocky areas Diet: Leaves and fruit, as well as seeds, roots, flowers, bark, twigs, coniferous cones, moss, lichens, ferns, shoots, rhizomes, grass, and invertebrate animals	LC Unknown
Nilgiri langur	S. johnii (J. Fischer, 1829)	Map of range	Size: 41–78 cm (16–31 in) long, plus 69–108 cm (27–43 in) tail Habitat: Forest Diet: Leaves, fruit, and flowers	VU 9,500–10,000
Northern plains gray langur	S. entellus (Dufresne, 1797)	India	Size: 41–78 cm (16–31 in) long, plus 69–108 cm (27–43 in) tail Habitat: Forest, savanna, and shrubland Diet: Leaves, fruit, and flowers, as well as insects, bark, gum, and soil	LC Unknown
Tarai gray langur	S. hector (Pocock, 1928)	Himalayas	Size: 41–78 cm (16–31 in) long, plus 69–108 cm (27–43 in) tail Habitat: Forest Diet: Leaves, fruit, and flowers	NT Unknown
Tufted gray langur	S. priam Blyth, 1844 Three subspecies: S. p. anchises; S. p. priam; S. p. thersites	Southern India and Sri Lanka	Size: 41–78 cm (16–31 in) long, plus 69–108 cm (27–43 in) tail Habitat: Forest and shrubland Diet: Leaves and fruit	NT Unknown
Purple-faced langur	S. vetulus (Erxleben, 1777) Four subspecies: T. v. monticola (Montane purple-faced langur); T. v. nestor (Western purple-faced langur); T. v. philbricki (Dryzone purple-faced langur); T. v. vetulus (Southern lowland wetzone purple-faced langur)	Sri Lanka	Size: 41–78 cm (16–31 in) long, plus 69–108 cm (27–43 in) tail Habitat: Forest Diet: Leaves, fruit, flowers, and seeds	EN Unknown

A 2013 genetic study indicated that while S. entellus, S. hypoleucos, S. priam and S. johnii are all valid taxa, there has been hybridization between S. priam and S. johnii. It also indicated that there has been some hybridization between S. entellus and S. hypoleucos where their ranges overlap, and a small amount of hybridization between S. hypoleucos and S. priam. It also suggested that S. priam and S. johnii diverged from each other fairly recently.

== Distribution and habitat ==
The entire distribution of all gray langur species stretches from the Himalayas in the north to Sri Lanka in the south, and from Bangladesh in the east to Pakistan in the west. They possibly occur in Afghanistan. The bulk of the gray langur distribution is within India, and all seven currently recognized species have at least a part of their range in this country.

Gray langurs can adapt to a variety of habitats. They inhabit arid habitats like deserts, tropical habitats like tropical rainforests and temperate habitats like coniferous forests, deciduous habitats and mountains habitats. They are found at sea level to altitudes up to 4,000 m (13,000 ft). They can adapt well to human settlements, and are found in villages, towns and areas with housing or agriculture. They live in densely populated cities like Jodhpur, which has a population numbering up to a million.

== Ecology and behavior ==
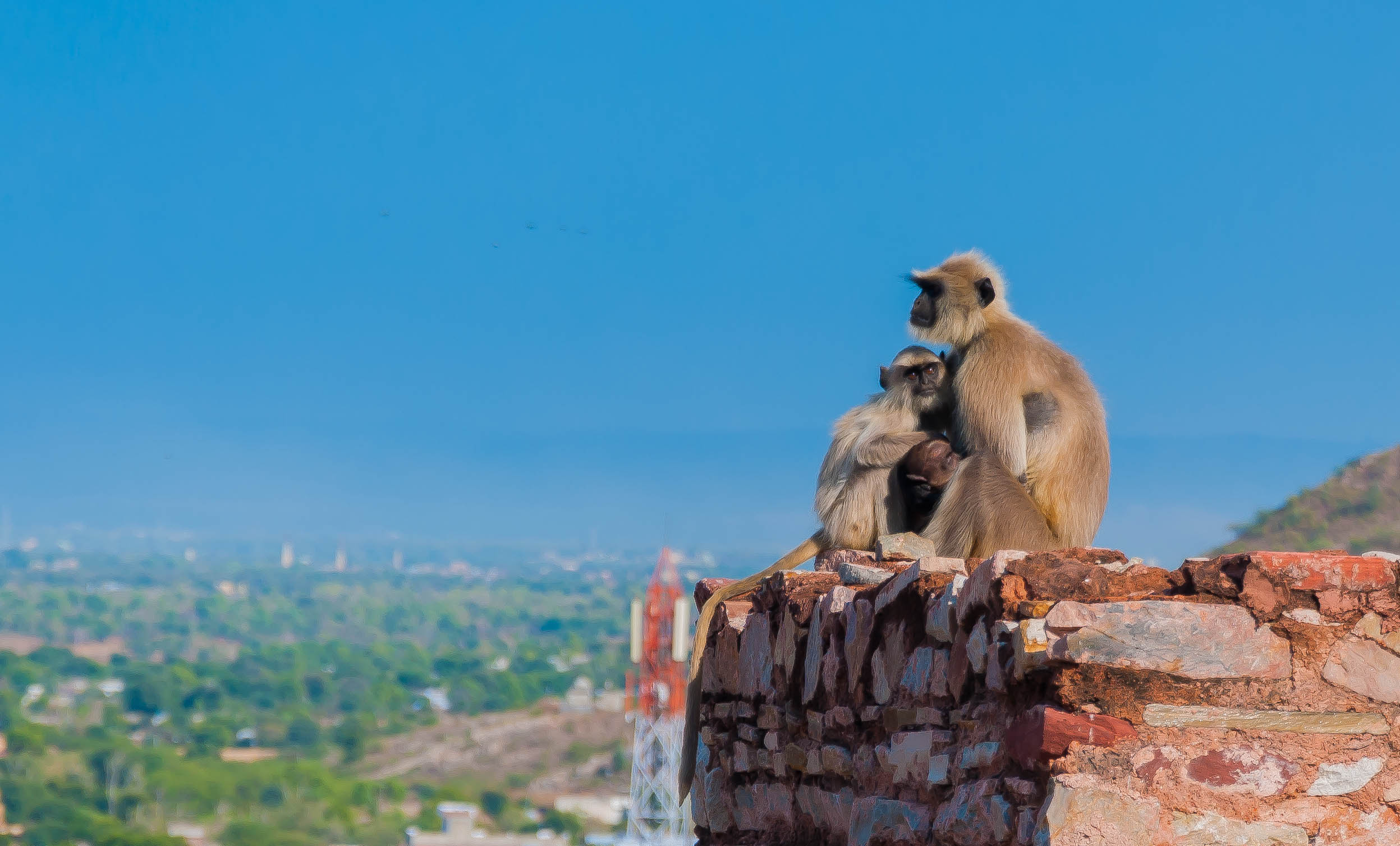
Gray langur

Gray langurs are diurnal. They sleep during the night in trees but also on man-made structures like towers and electric poles when in human settlements. When resting in trees, they generally prefer the highest branches.

Langurs Grooming in Community

Ungulates like bovine and deer will eat food dropped by foraging langurs. Langurs are preyed upon by leopards, dholes and tigers. Wolves, jackals, Asian black bears and pythons may also prey on langurs.

=== Diet ===
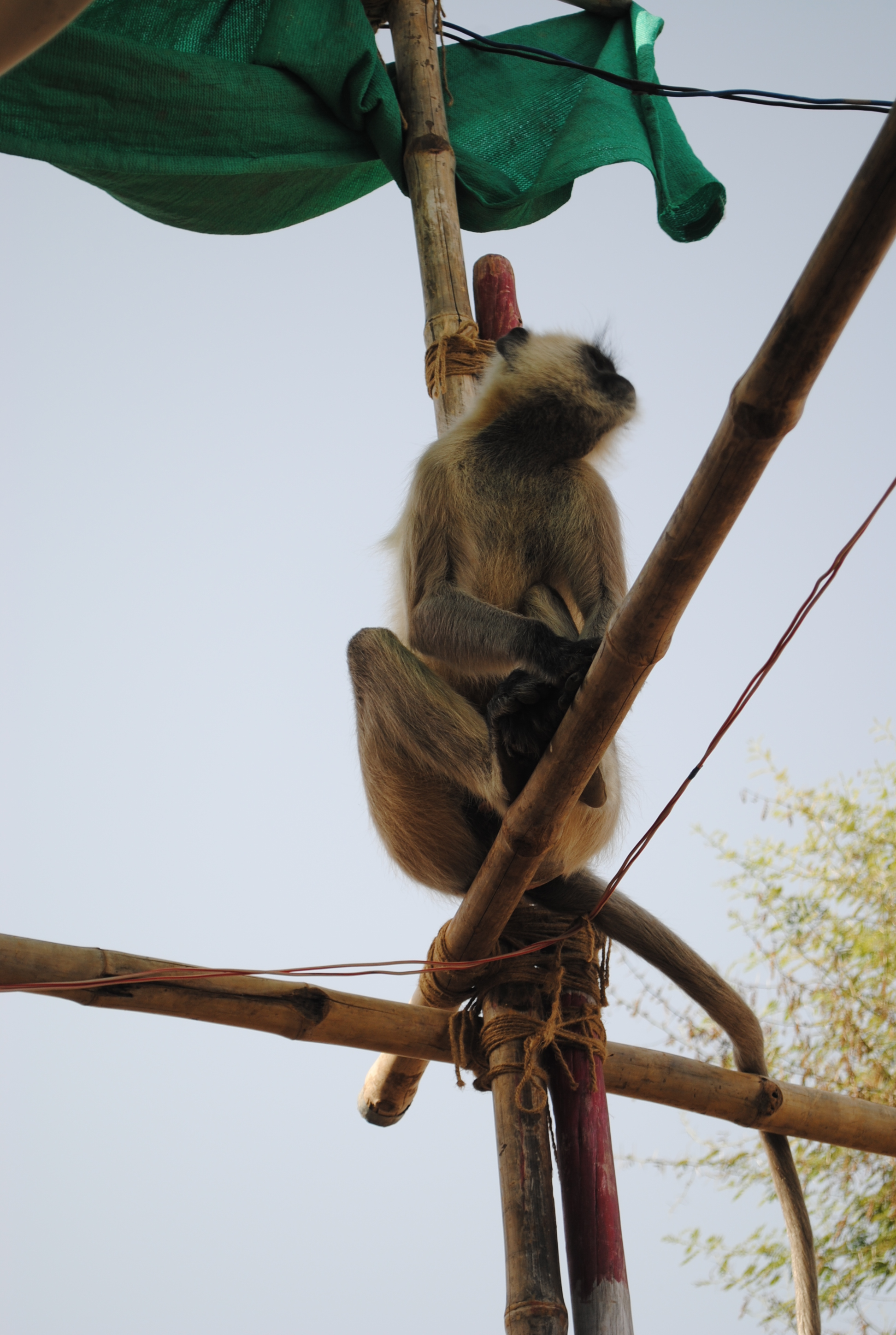
Gray Langur near a village in Rajasthan

Gray langurs are primarily herbivores. However, unlike some other colobines they do not depend on leaves and leaf buds of herbs, but will also eat coniferous needles and cones, fruits and fruit buds, evergreen petioles, shoots and roots, seeds, grass, bamboo, fern rhizomes, mosses, and lichens. Leaves of trees and shrubs rank at the top of preferred food, followed by herbs and grasses. Non-plant material consumed include spider webs, termite mounds and insect larvae. They forage on agricultural crops and other human foods, and even accept handouts. Although they occasionally drink, langurs get most of their water from the moisture in their food.

=== Social structure ===
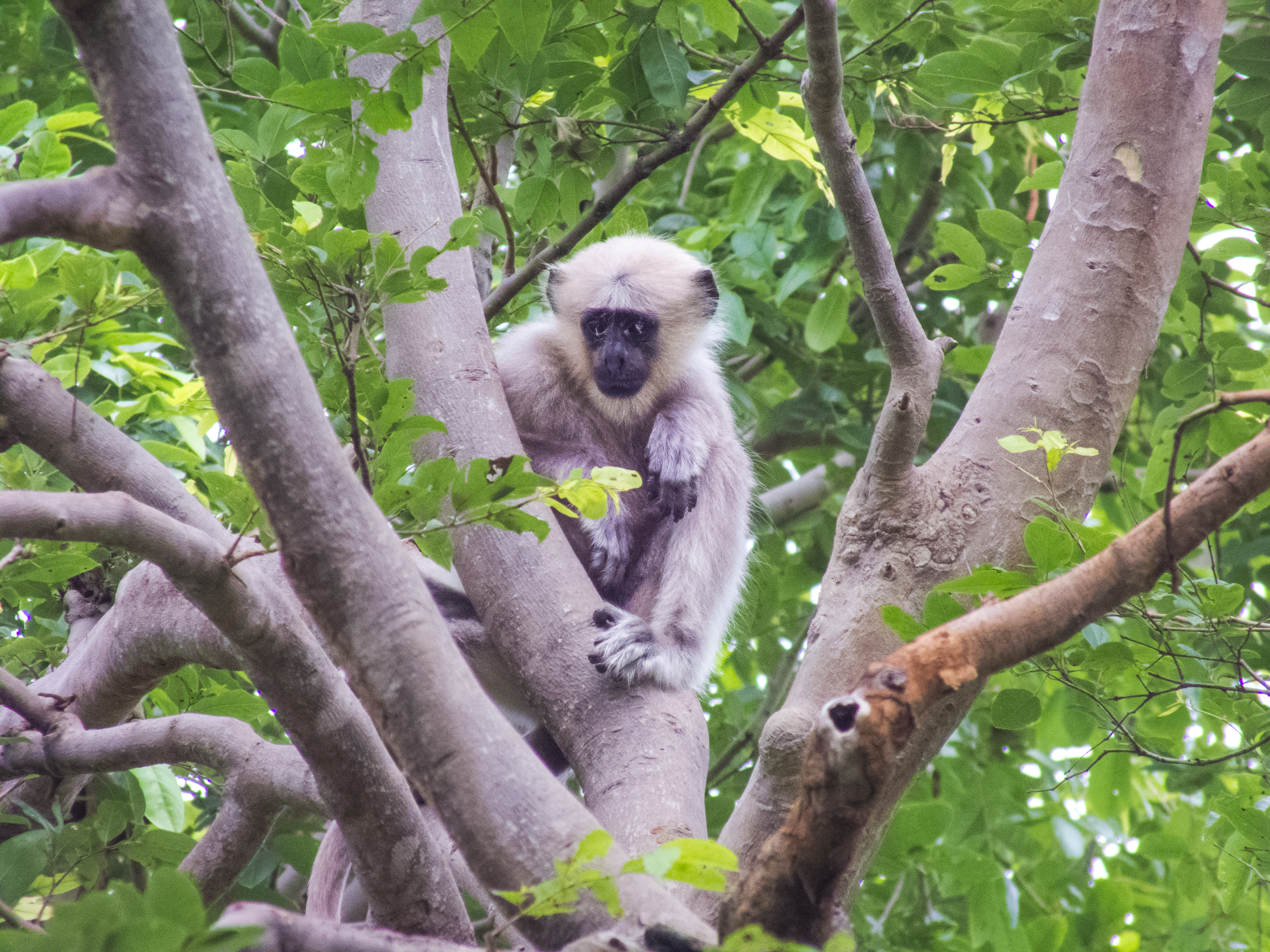
Juvenile gray langur

Gray langurs exist in three types of groups:

- one-male groups, comprising one adult male, several females and offspring;
- multiple-male groups, comprising males and females of all ages;
- all-male groups.

All-male groups tend to be the smallest of the groups and can consist of adults, subadults, and juveniles. Some populations have only multiple-male groups as mixed sex groups, while others have only one-male groups as mixed sexed groups.

Some evidence suggests multiple-male groups are temporary and exist only after a takeover, and subsequently split into one-male and all-male groups.

Social hierarchies exist for all group types. In all-male groups, dominance is attained through aggression and mating success. With sexually mature females, rank is based on physical condition and age. The younger the female, the higher the rank. Dominance rituals are most common among high-ranking langurs. Most changes in social rank in males take place during changes in group members. An adult male may remain in a one-male group for 45 months. The rate of male replacement can occur quickly or slowly depending on the group.

Females within a group are matrilineally related. Female memberships are also stable, but less so in larger groups. Relationships between the females tend to be friendly. They will do various activities with each together, such as foraging, traveling and resting. They will also groom each other regardless of their rank. However, higher-ranking females give out and receive grooming the most. In addition, females groom males more often than the other way around. Male and female relationships are usually positive. Relationships between males can range from peaceful to violent. While females remain in their natal groups, males will leave when they reach adulthood. Relationships between groups tend to be hostile. High-ranking males from different groups will display, vocalize, and fight among themselves.

=== Reproduction and parenting ===
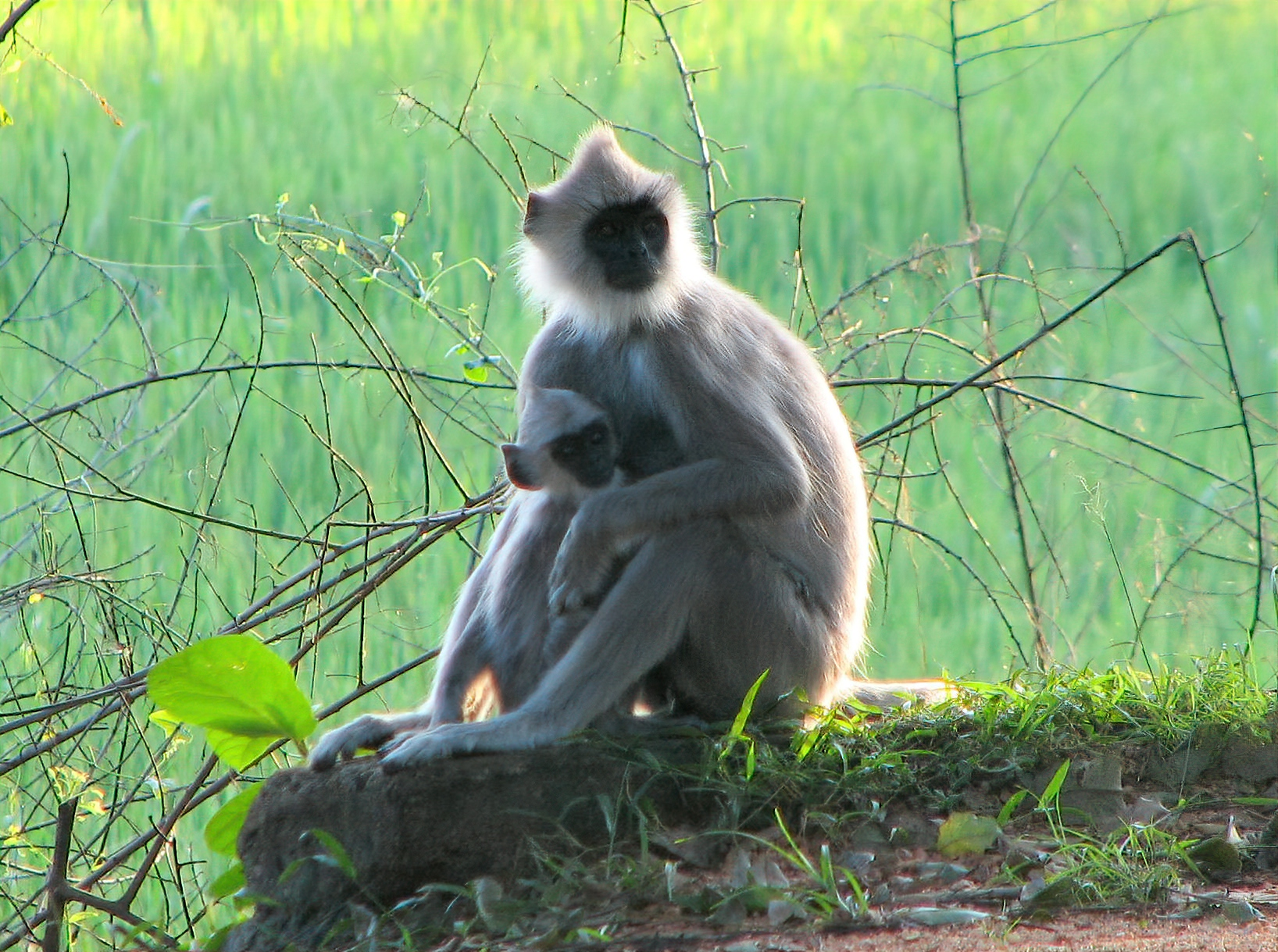
Tufted gray langur with young

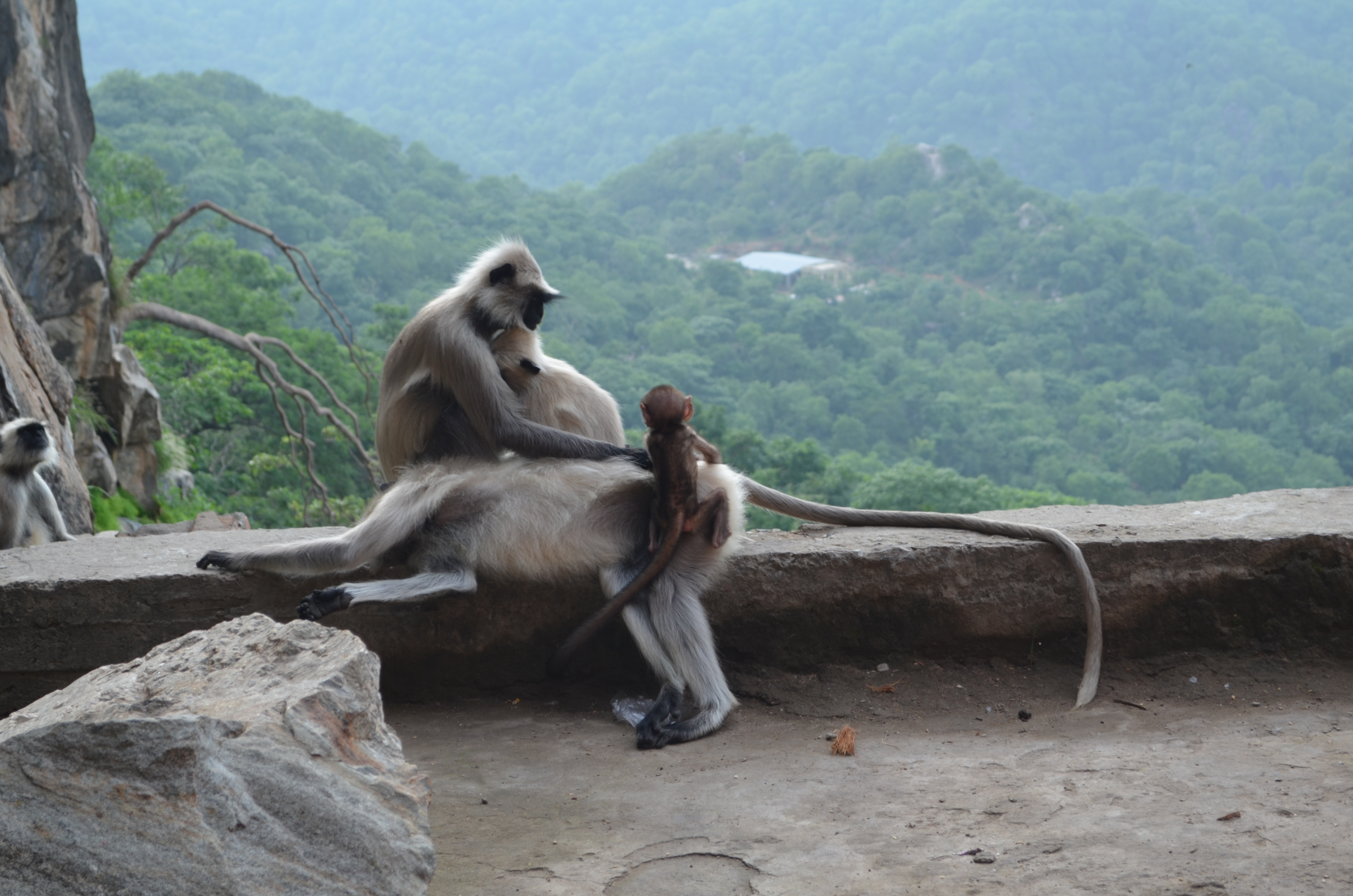
Gray langur with newborn

In one-male groups, the resident male is usually the sole breeder of the females and sires all the young. In multiple-male groups, the highest-ranking male fathers most of the offspring, followed by the next-ranking males and even outside males will father young. Higher-ranking females are more reproductively successful than lower-ranking ones.

Female gray langurs do not make it obvious that they are in estrous. However, males are still somehow able to deduce the reproduction state of females. Females signal that they are ready to mate by shuddering the head, lowering the tail, and presenting their anogenital regions. Such solicitations do not always lead to copulation. When langurs mate, they are sometimes disrupted by other group members. Female langurs have been recorded mounting other females.

The gestation period of gray langur lasts around 200 days, at least at Jodhpur, India. In some areas, reproduction is year-around. Year-round reproduction appears to occur in populations that capitalize on human-made foods. Other populations have seasonal reproduction. Infanticide is common among gray langurs. Most infanticidal langurs are males that have recently immigrated to a group and driven out the prior male. These males only kill infants that are not their own. Infanticide is more commonly reported in one-male groups, perhaps because one male monopolizing matings drives the evolution of this trait. In multiple-male groups, the costs for infanticidal males are likely to be high as the other males may protect the infants and they can't ensure that they'll sire young with other males around. Nevertheless, infanticide does occur in these groups, and is suggested that such practices serve to return a female to estrous and gain the opportunity to mate.

Females usually give birth to a single infant, although twins do occur. Most births occur during the night. Infants are born with thin, dark brown or black hair and pale skin. Infants spend their first week attached to their mothers' chests and mostly just suckle or sleep. They do not move much in terms of locomotion for the first two weeks of their life. As they approach their sixth week of life, infants vocalize more. They use squeaks and shrieks to communicate stress. In the following months, the infants are capable of quadrupedal locomotion and can walk, run and jump by the second and third months. Alloparenting occurs among langurs, starting when the infants reach two years of age. The infant will be given to the other females of the group. However, if the mother dies, the infant usually follows. Langurs are weaned by 13 months.

=== Vocalizations ===
Gray langurs are recorded to make a number of vocalizations:

- loud calls or whoops made only by adult males during displays;
- harsh barks made by adult and subadult males when surprised by a predator;
- cough barks made by adults and subadults during group movements;
- grunt barks made mostly by adult males during group movements and agonistic interactions;
- rumble screams made in agonistic interactions;
- pant barks made with loud calls when groups are interacting;
- grunts made in many different situations, usually in agonistic ones;
- honks made by adult males when groups are interacting;
- rumbles made during approaches, embraces, and mounts;
- hiccups made by most members of a group when they find another group.

== Status and conservation ==
Gray langurs have stable populations in some areas and declining ones in others. Both the black-footed gray langur and Kashmir gray langur are considered threatened. The latter is the rarest species of gray langur, with less than 250 mature individuals remaining.

In India, gray langurs number at around 300,000. India has laws prohibiting the capturing or killing of langurs, but they are still hunted in some parts of the country. Enforcement of these laws has proven to be difficult and it seems most people are unaware of their protection. Populations are also threatened by mining, forest fires and deforestation for wood.

Langurs can be found near roads and can become victims of automobile accidents. This happens even in protected areas, with deaths by automobile collisions making nearly a quarter of mortality in Kumbhalgarh Wildlife Sanctuary in Rajasthan, India. Langurs are considered sacred in the Hindu religion and are sometimes kept for religious purposes by Hindu priests and for roadside performances. However, some religious groups use langurs as food and medicine, and parts of gray langurs are sometimes kept as amulets for good luck.

Because of their sacred status and their less aggressive behavior compared to other primates, langurs are generally not considered pests in many parts of India. Despite this, research in some areas show high levels of support for the removal of langurs from villages, their sacred status no longer important. Langurs will raid crops and steal food from houses, and this causes people to persecute them. While people may feed them in temples, they do not extend such care to monkeys at their homes. Langurs stealing and biting people to get food in urban areas may also contribute to more persecutions.

== Sources ==
- Nowak, Ronald M. (1999). Walker's Primates of the World. Johns Hopkins University Press. ISBN 978-0-8018-6251-9.
