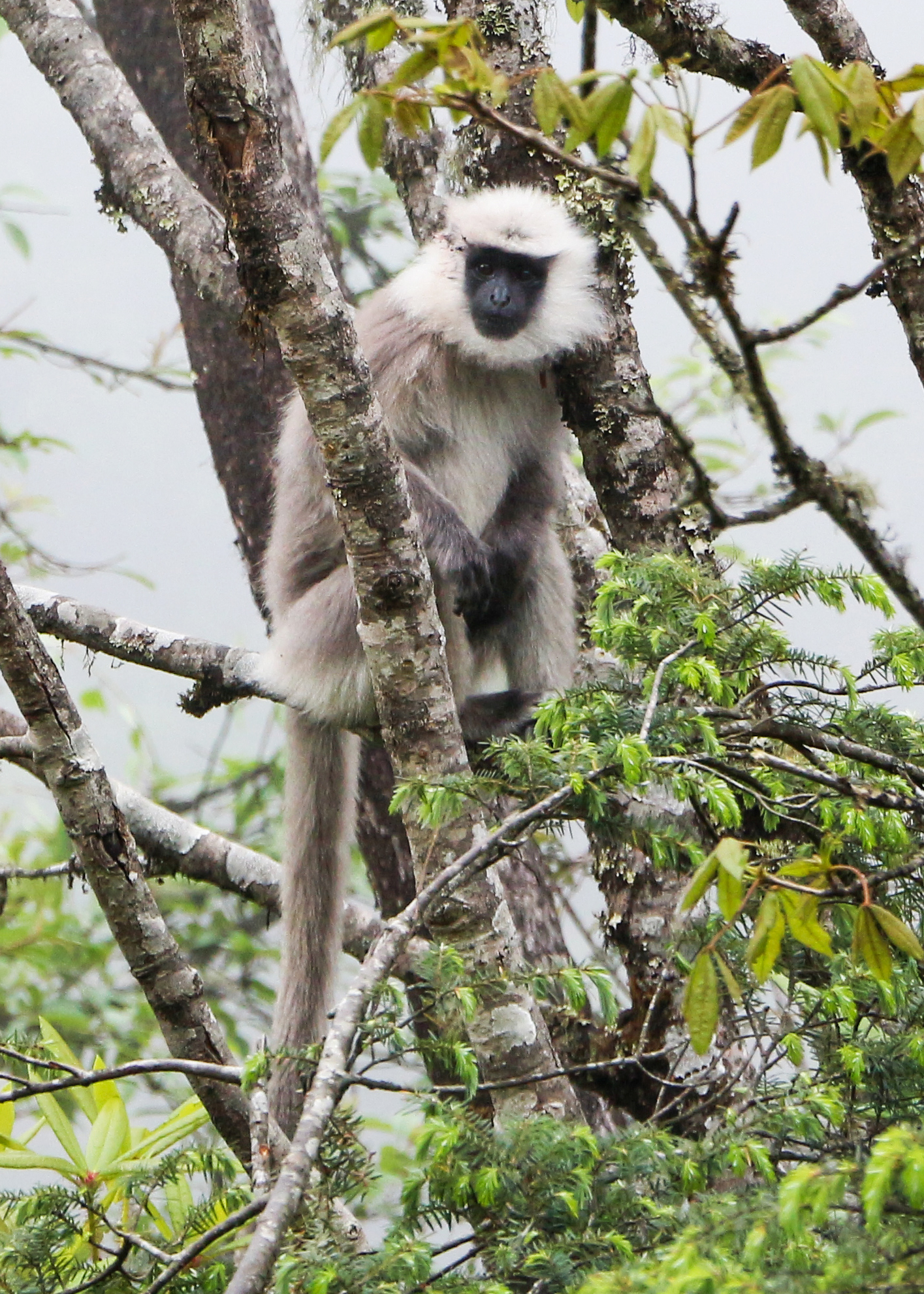

Conservation status
- Least Concern (IUCN 3.1)
- CITES Appendix I

Scientific classification
- Kingdom: Animalia
- Phylum: Chordata
- Class: Mammalia
- Infraclass: Placentalia
- Order: Primates
- Family: Cercopithecidae
- Genus: Semnopithecus
- Species: S. schistaceus

Binomial name
- Semnopithecus schistaceus Hodgson, 1840
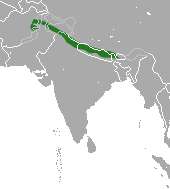
- Nepal Gray Langur range

= Nepal gray langur =

Species of Old World monkey

The Nepal gray langur (Semnopithecus schistaceus) is a gray langur endemic to the Himalayas in Nepal, far southwestern Tibet, northern India, northern Pakistan, Bhutan and possibly Afghanistan. It is found in forests at an elevation of 1,500 to 4,000 metres (4,900 to 13,100 ft). Its easternmost limit in India is Buxa Tiger Reserve in northern West Bengal, at least up to the Rydak river.

The Nepal gray langur is both terrestrial and arboreal and eats leaves. At 26.5 kilograms (58 lb), the heaviest langur ever recorded was a male Nepal gray langur.
