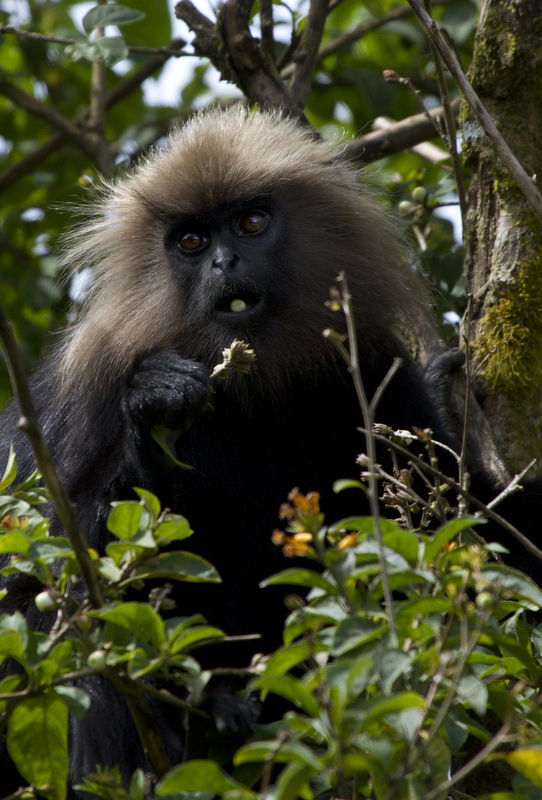
- Nilgiri langur eating fruit.
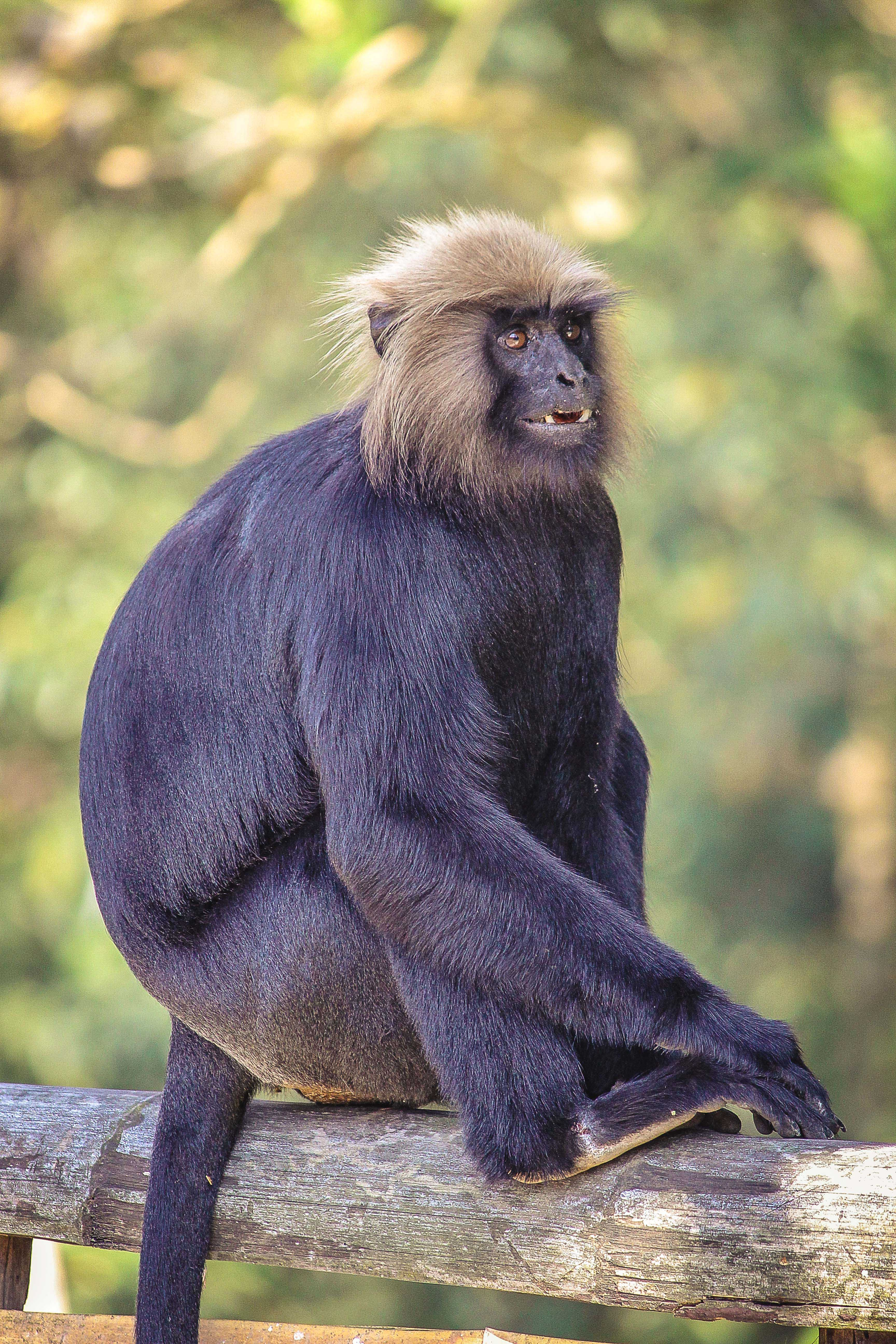
- At Parambikulam.

Conservation status
- Vulnerable (IUCN 3.1)

Scientific classification
- Kingdom: Animalia
- Phylum: Chordata
- Class: Mammalia
- Order: Primates
- Family: Cercopithecidae
- Genus: Semnopithecus
- Species: S. johnii

Binomial name
- Semnopithecus johnii (J. Fischer, 1829)
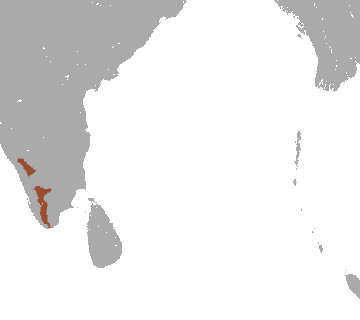
- Nilgiri langur range

Synonyms
- Semnopithecus cucullatus I.Geoffroy Saint-Hilaire, 1834; Semnopithecus jubatus Wagner, 1839; Simia johnii (Fischer, 1829); Trachypithecus cucullatus (Fischer, 1829); Trachypithecus johnii (J.Fischer, 1829); Trachypithecus jubatus (Wagner, 1839); Trachypithecus leonina (Shaw, 1800)

= Nilgiri langur =

Species of Old World monkey

The Nilgiri langur (Semnopithecus johnii) is an Asian langur of the Old World monkey. It has glossy, black fur and an orangey-golden brown, hair-like mane on its head. Females have a white patch of fur on the inner thigh. It typically lives in troops of nine to ten individuals, with or without offspring, depending on seasonality. Its diet consists of fruits, shoots and leaves. It is listed as vulnerable on the IUCN Red List and is threatened by habitat destruction and poaching for its body parts, thought to supposedly contain aphrodisiac properties.

== Taxonomy and classification ==
The classification of the Nilgiri langur has been disputed. Traditionally it has been placed within the genus Trachypithecus based on morphological similarities such as cranial morphology and neonatal pelage color, and within the Trachypithecus vetulus group within Trachypithecus based on a presumed close relationship with the purple-faced langur (Semnopithecus vetulus), which had formerly been classified as T. vetulus. DNA and other evidence suggests that the Nilgiri and purple-faced langurs are more closely related to the gray langurs, and have thus been reclassified within the genus Semnopithecus.

== Description ==
Adult males have a head-to-body length of 78–80 cm (31–31 in) and adult females of 58–60 cm (23–24 in); their tails are 68.5–96.5 cm (27.0–38.0 in) long. Males weigh 9.1–14.8 kg (20–33 lb) and females 10.9–12 kg (24–26 lb).

== Distribution ==
The Nilgiri langur is native to the Nilgiri Hills of South India, where it occurs at elevations of 300–2,000 m (980–6,560 ft) in the states of Karnataka, Kerala and Tamil Nadu. It has been sighted in Agasthyamala Biosphere Reserve, Aliyar Forest Reserve, Anamalai Tiger Reserve, Bandipur National Park, Eravikulam National Park, Idamalayar Reserve Forest, Mudumalai National Park, Mukurthi National Park, Mundanthurai Tiger Reserve, Nelliampathi, Periyar National Park, Shendurney Wildlife Sanctuary and Silent Valley National Park.

== Behaviour and ecology ==
The gestation period is not precisely known but assumed to be 200 days.
