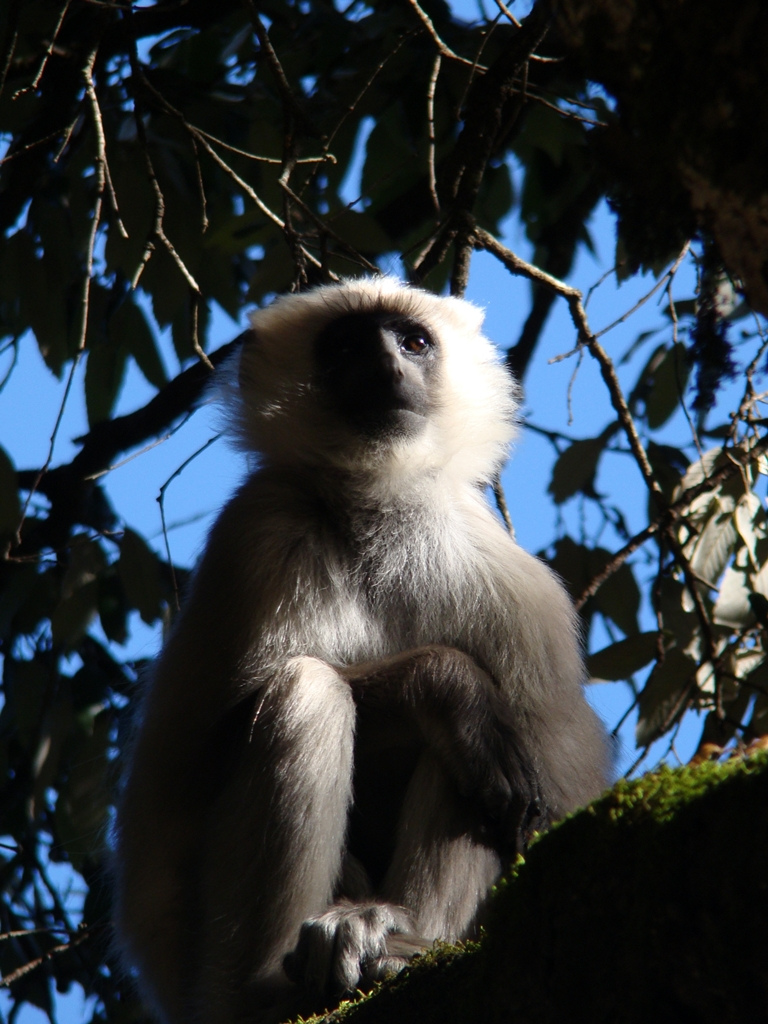
- Tarai Gray langur at Kilbury Road Nainital

Conservation status
- Near Threatened (IUCN 3.1)
- CITES Appendix I (CITES)

Scientific classification
- Kingdom: Animalia
- Phylum: Chordata
- Class: Mammalia
- Order: Primates
- Family: Cercopithecidae
- Genus: Semnopithecus
- Species: S. hector

Binomial name
- Semnopithecus hector Pocock, 1928
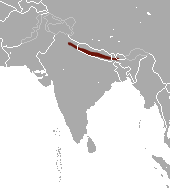
- Tarai gray langur range

= Tarai gray langur =

Species of Old World monkey

The Tarai gray langur (Semnopithecus hector) is an Old World monkey, and was formerly considered a subspecies of the northern plains gray langur. The species is listed as near threatened, as there are probably not many more than 10,000 mature individuals, and it is experiencing a continuing decline.

== Habitat and behaviour ==
The Tarai gray langur is native to northern India, Bhutan, and Nepal, and inhabits the Himalayan foothills from Rajaji National Park to southwestern Bhutan. It also lives in the moist deciduous forest of the Siwalik Hills to oak forest ranging from altitudes of 150 to 1,600 m (490 to 5,250 ft).

It is a diurnal species which lives arboreally in the top canopy of sal tree forests in India and Nepal. The species' population is fragmented, with a 2003 report estimating that there were at most fifty separate subpopulations. The monkeys are leaf-eaters who live in groups with multiple males and females. Groups have been observed feeding in orchards and crop fields outside of Rajaji National Park.

== Conservation ==
The Tarai gray langur is near threatened, and the monkeys are threatened by human industrial activity (such as mining and logging) as well as human resettlement. While they are not traded, their population is still in decline. They have a generation time of twelve years.
