= Folivore =

Herbivorous animal that specializes in eating leaves

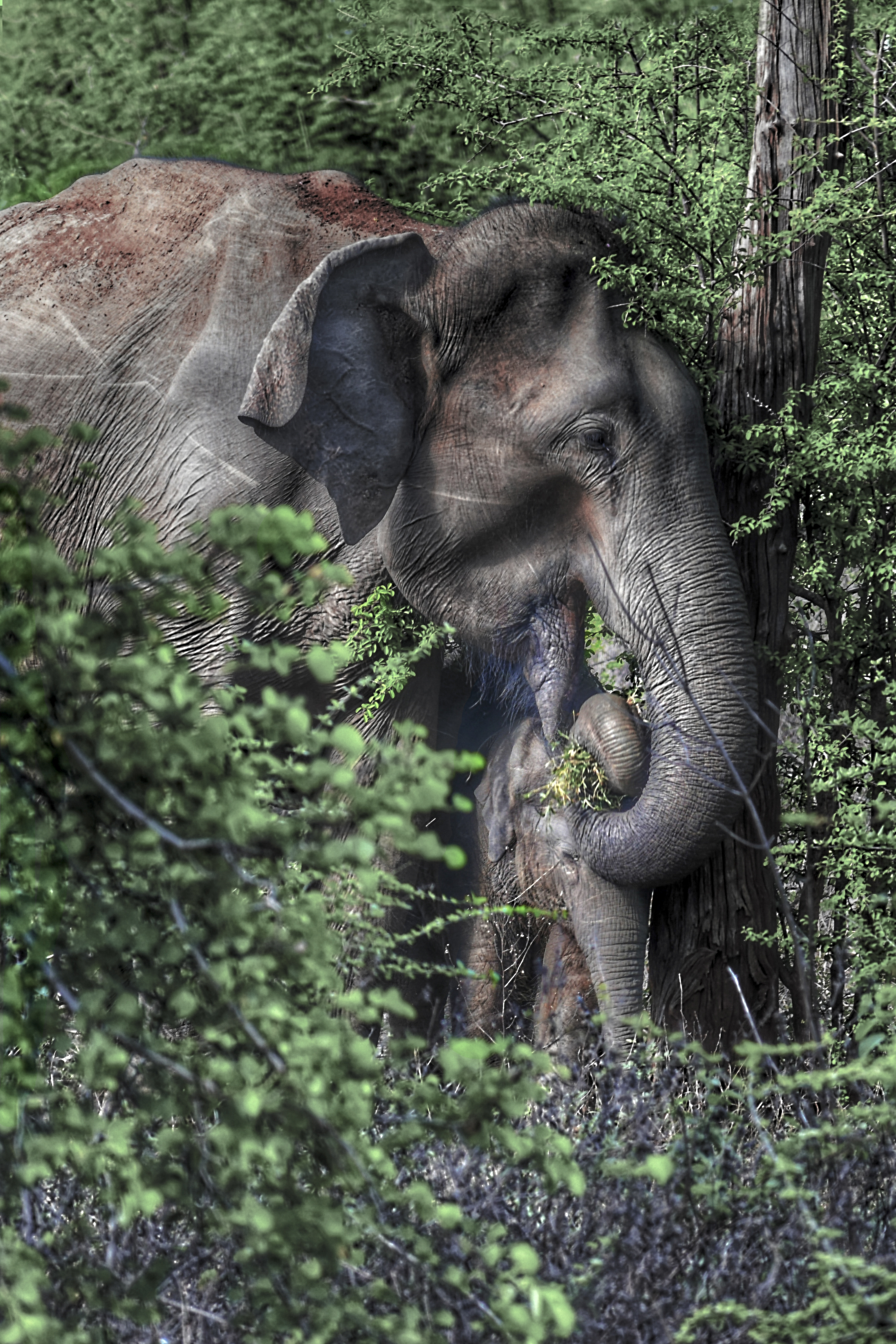
Elephants are an example of a mammalian folivore.

In zoology, a folivore is a herbivore that specializes in eating leaves. Mature leaves contain a high proportion of hard-to-digest cellulose, less energy than other types of foods, and often toxic compounds. For this reason, folivorous animals tend to have long digestive tracts and slow metabolisms. Many enlist the help of symbiotic bacteria to release the nutrients in their diet. Additionally, as has been observed in folivorous primates, they exhibit a strong preference for immature leaves which tend to be easier to masticate, are higher in energy and protein, and lower in fibre and poisons than more mature fibrous leaves.

== Folivory and flight ==
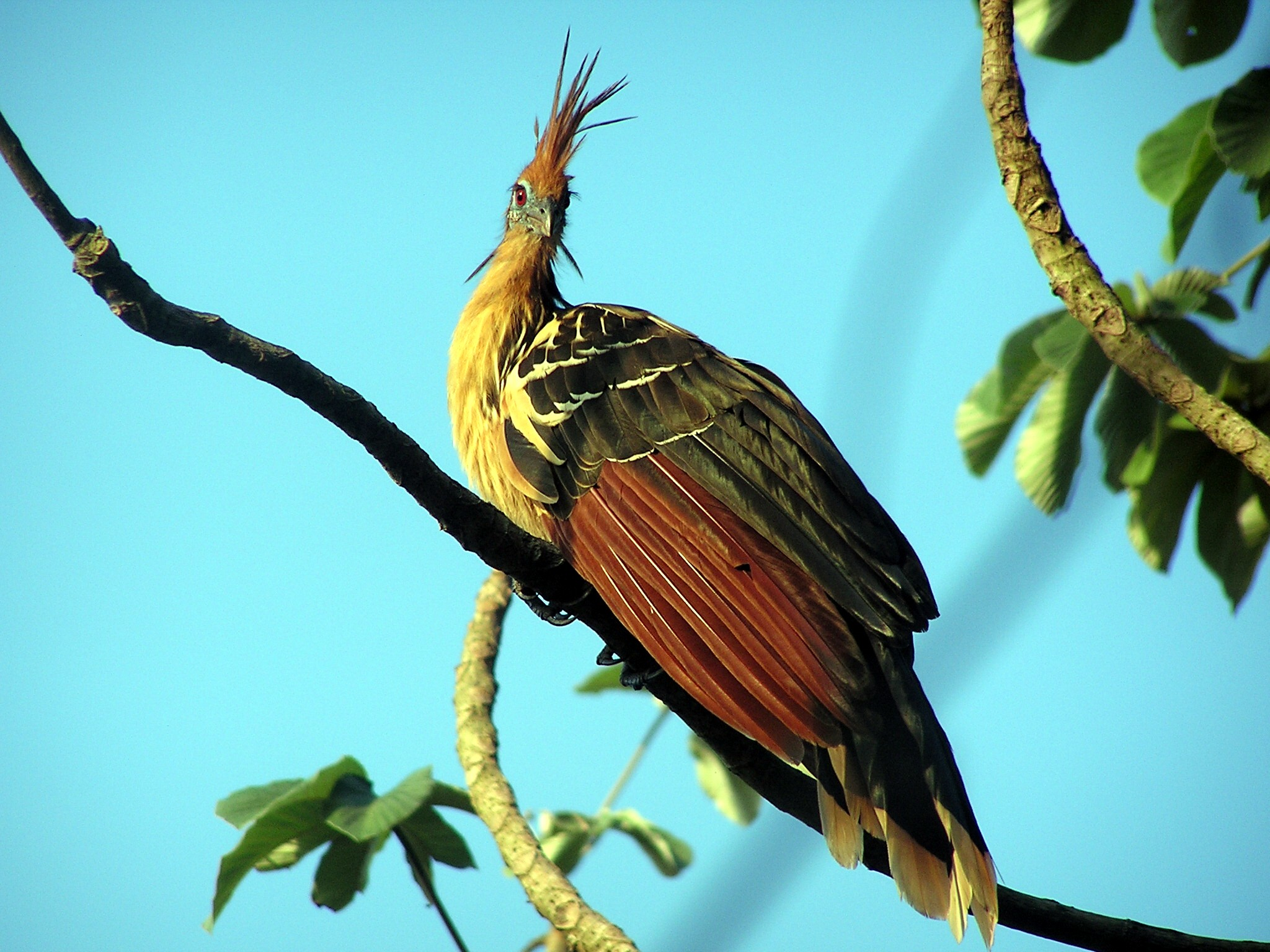
A hoatzin

It has been observed that folivory is extremely rare among flying vertebrates. Morton (1978) attributed this to the fact that leaves are heavy, slow to digest, and contain little energy relative to other foods. The hoatzin is an example of a flighted, folivorous bird, but it is a weak flier, due to the well-developed foregut (used to digest its food) reducing the area available for flight muscles to attach. There are, however, many species of folivorous flying insects.

Some bats are partially folivorous; their method of deriving nourishment from leaves, according to Lowry (1989), is to chew up the leaves, swallowing the sap and spitting out the remainder.

== Arboreal folivores ==
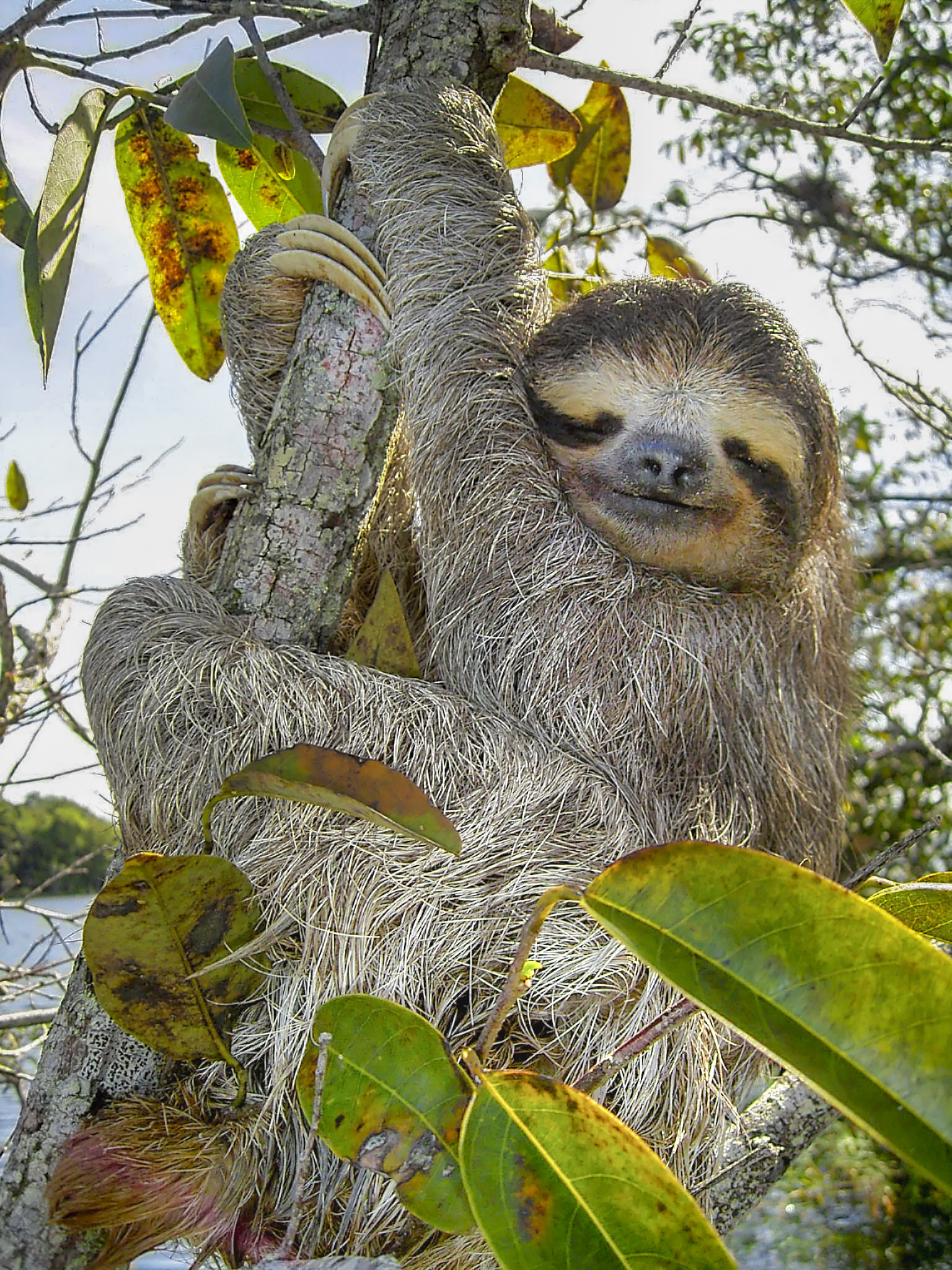
A brown-throated three-toed sloth

Arboreal mammalian folivores, such as sloths, koalas, and some species of monkeys and lemurs, tend to be large and climb cautiously. Similarities in body shape and head- and tooth-structure between early hominoids and various families of arboreal folivores have been advanced as evidence that early hominoids were also folivorous.

== Primates ==
Standard ecological theory predicts relatively large group sizes for folivorous primates, as large groups offer better collective defense against predators and they face little competition for food among each other. It has been observed that these animals nevertheless frequently live in small groups. Explanations offered for this apparent paradox include social factors such as increased incidence of infanticide in large groups.

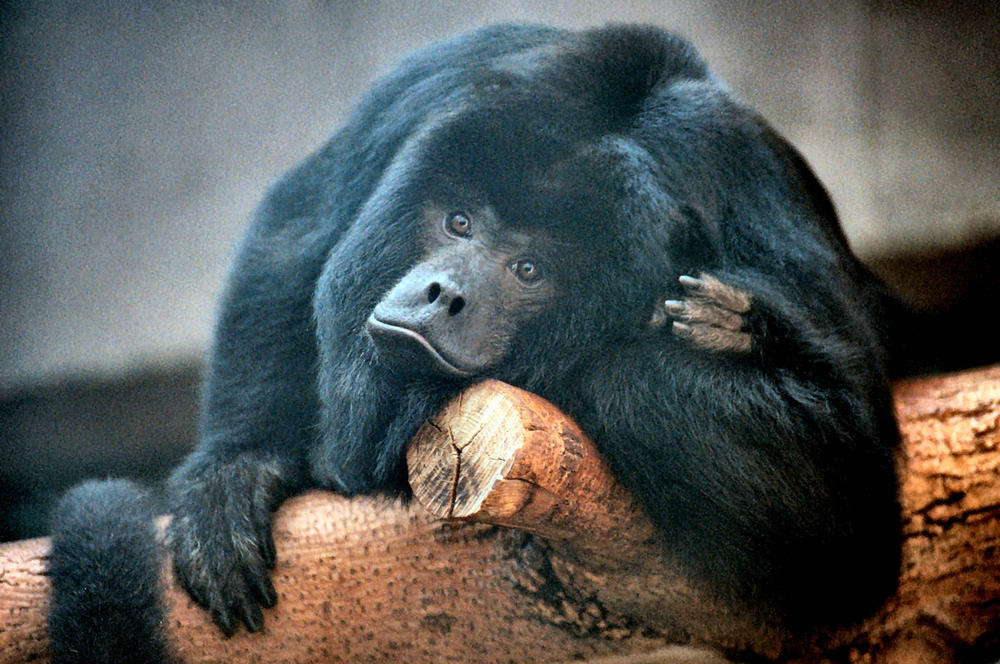
A howler monkey

Folivorous primates are relatively rare in the New World, the primary exception being howler monkeys. One explanation that has been offered is that fruiting and leafing occur simultaneously among New World plants. However a 2001 study found no evidence for simultaneous fruiting and leafing at most sites, apparently disproving this hypothesis.

== Examples ==
Examples of folivorous animals include:

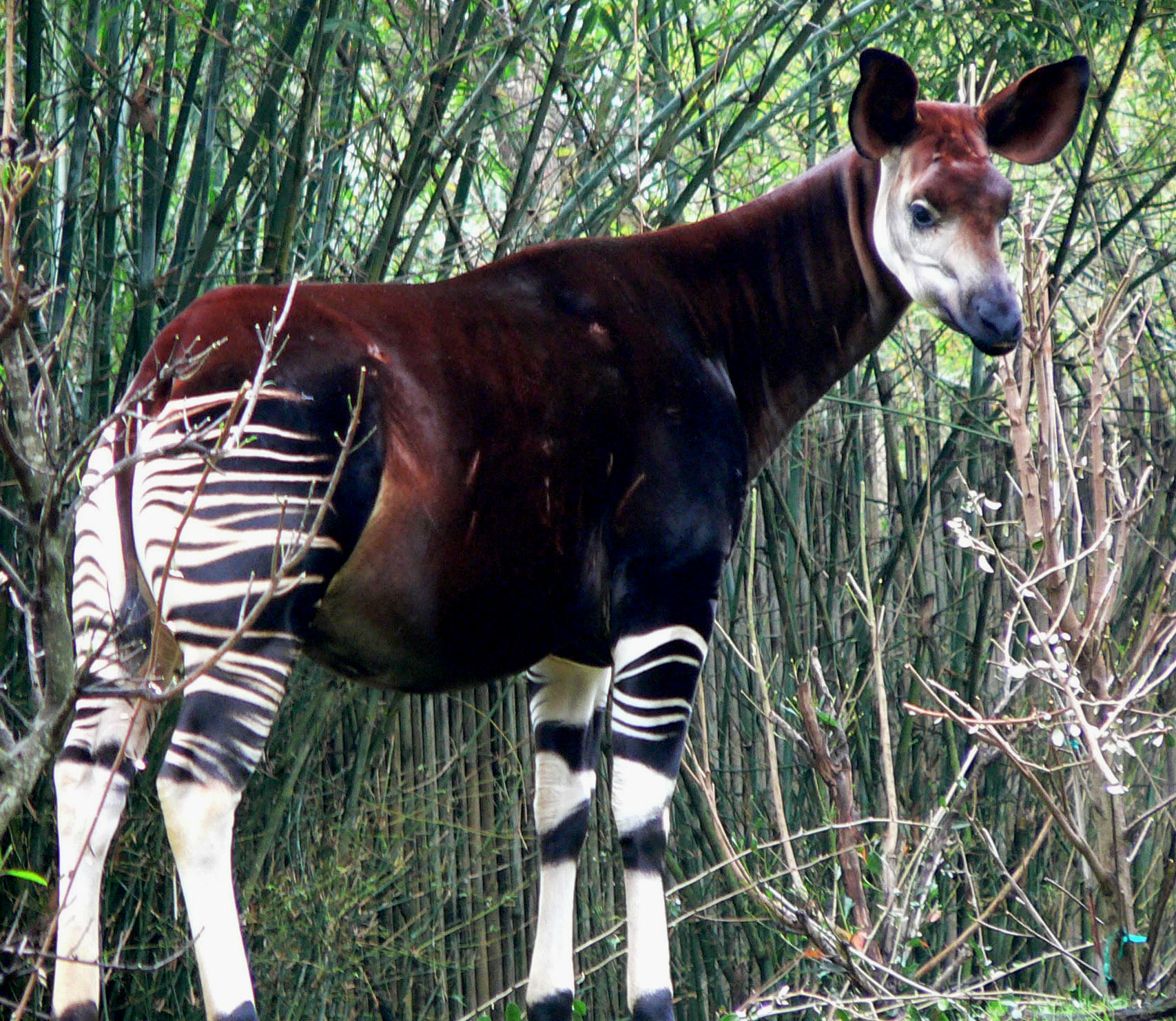
An okapi

- Mammals: okapis, elephants, sloths, possums, giant pandas, koalas and various species of monkey, i.e. New World howlers and Old World colobines
- Birds: The hoatzin of the Amazon region and the kākāpō of New Zealand
- Reptiles: iguanas
- Insects: various kinds of caterpillars, sawflies, beetles, leaf miners and Orthoptera
- Others: many land gastropod species (snails and slugs)

== See also ==
- Consumer-resource systems
- Leaf miner, the folivorous strategy of many insects
