= Gorlic acid =

Names
- IUPAC name (Z)-13-[(1R)-cyclopent-2-en-1-yl]tridec-6-enoic acid
- Other names (E)-13-cyclopent-2-en-1-yltridec-6-enoic

Identifiers
CAS Number	502-31-8
3D model (JSmol)	Interactive image
ChEBI	CHEBI:61676
ChemSpider	26332318
PubChem CID	51351687
- InChI: InChI=1S/C18H30O2/c19-18(20)16-10-8-6-4-2-1-3-5-7-9-13-17-14-11-12-15-17/h2,4,11,14,17H,1,3,5-10,12-13,15-16H2,(H,19,20)/b4-2-/t17-/m0/s1 Key: XADKGDBMULSEAC-MMTGSJLXSA-N
- SMILES: C1C[C@H](C=C1)CCCCCC/C=C\CCCCC(=O)O

Properties
Chemical formula	C_{18}H_{30}O_{2}
Molar mass	278.436 g·mol^{−1}
Melting point	6 °C (43 °F; 279 K)
- Except where otherwise noted, data are given for materials in their standard state (at 25 °C [77 °F], 100 kPa). Infobox references

Gorlic acid is a long-chain unsaturated carbocyclic fatty acid composed of 18 carbon atoms, featuring a five-membered cyclopentene ring and a cis-double bond in the position 6=7. The chemical formula is C_{18}H_{30}O_{2}. In biochemistry, the compound is considered a rare fatty acid that is only found in some plants.

== Natural occurrence ==
The acid was initially isolated by French chemists E. André and D. Jouatte in 1928—from the seed oil of a tropical West African tree Oncoba echinata, called "gorli" in the local language, hence the name.

The seeds of a large number of shrubs and trees belonging to the plant family formerly called Flacourtiaceae (now Achariaceae and Salicaceae) contain lipids that are characterized by cyclopentenyl fatty acids, one of which is gorlic acid. The concentrations of gorlic acid in the carbohydrates of seed oils are: Hydnocarpus kurzii (22.6–25.1%), Caloncoba echinata (23.3%), Taraktogenos merrilliano (19.7%), Hydnocarpus anthelminticus (14%), Hydnocarpus wightianus (10–13.8%), and others to a lesser extent.

Chemically, it's an unsaturated fatty acid with a cyclopentene ring, and often found alongside its isomer, chaulmoogric acid, in traditional remedies from Asia and Africa.

== Uses ==
Gorlic acid is a chemical compound that was historically a component of chaulmoogra oil, an ancient traditional medicine used for treating leprosy and other skin disorders. Along with hydnocarpic and chaulmoogric acids, gorlic acid was one of the primary cyclic fatty acids in the oil believed to be responsible for its therapeutic effects. The oil is also used to treat constipation, inflammation, blood disorders, and worm infestations.

== See also ==
- Chaulmoogric acid
- Hydnocarpic acid
