= C19H38O2 =

The molecular formula C_{19}H_{38}O_{2} may refer to:

- Nonadecylic acid, or nonadecanoic acid
- Isopropyl palmitate
- Pristanic acid
- Tuberculostearic acid
