= Bửu Hội =

Vietnamese diplomat, scientist and cancer researcher

Nguyễn Phúc Bửu Hội
- Born: 1915; Huế
- Died: January 28, 1972 (aged 56–57)
- Parent: Ưng Úy

Prince Nguyễn Phúc Bửu Hội (c. 1915 – 28 January 1972) was a Vietnamese diplomat, scientist and cancer researcher.

== Family ==
Born c. 1915, Bửu Hội was a native of the former imperial capital of Huế. He was a great-great-grandson of Emperor Minh Mạng, who ruled Vietnam from 1820 until his death in 1841. Mạng had been a staunch Confucianist, known for his conservative philosophy, in which he shunned the western world and technological and scientific innovations. He resisted Catholic and Buddhist missionaries in Vietnam and was known for his hostility toward them, as he believed they were undermining the Emperor's Mandate of Heaven.

Mạng's father was Emperor Gia Long, who had united Vietnam under its current state. Gia Long had reunited the nation under the newly formed Nguyễn Dynasty with the help of French volunteers recruited by the Jesuit missionary Pigneau de Behaine after more than 200 years of north–south division and multiple wars between the Nguyễn lords in the south and the Trịnh lords in the north.

Bửu Hội was a Confucianist, instilled with a sense of duty to family and service to the nation. In contrast to his ancestors, Bửu Hội was also a secular-minded Buddhist, and his mother later became a Buddhist nun under the dharma name Thích Diệu Huế. His father Ưng Úy headed the Privy Council of the Imperial Family. Ưng Úy was the Minister of Rites at Bảo Đại's court until 9 May 1945. During First Indochina War, Ưng Úy joined Vietminh's government and showed support to Ho Chi Minh during war against French.

== Education ==
Bửu Hội completed his secondary schooling at the Lycée Albert Sarraut, a prestigious French-established school for the upper-class in Hanoi, the colonial capital of Vietnam. He then studied for a degree in pharmacy at the University of Hanoi while simultaneously auditing courses from the Faculty of Medicine. He had developed an interest in science from his youth, noting that this was "because of the desire of his mother and partly because of his own belief in the human value of science".

Hội left Vietnam in 1935 to study in Paris and was never to return as a resident. There, he befriended Ngô Đình Nhu, the younger brother of Ngô Đình Diệm while in France. Nhu was a staunch advocate of personalism and later became known for his efforts in running the clandestine Cần Lao party, which supplied Diệm's power base and acted as a security apparatus to crush dissent in South Vietnam. This formed a bond between the two men which saw Bửu Hội later serve in the diplomatic corps and as a scientific advisor to Diệm.

== Scientific work ==
At the Sorbonne, he followed the regular curriculum towards his doctorate. He completed a licence ès sciences degree while serving as an Intern of Pharmacy at Paris hospitals. After a short stint under Jean Perrin in the Institute of Chemical Physics, he began his doctoral research in organic chemistry. He worked in the laboratory of Pauline Ramart, investigating the spectrophotometry of organic compounds.

=== During World War II ===
Bửu Hội's career was briefly interrupted by the outbreak of World War II. He volunteered in the French Army and served until Paris fell to Nazi Germany in May 1940. He found himself in Toulouse in the southern zone under the fascist Vichy France government. With the help of the physicist Paul Langevin whom he had met at Perrin's party, he was able to re-enter the Nazi-occupied northern France and return to Paris. He joined the research staff of the National Center of Scientific Research (CNRS) in 1941, and upon the Liberation of France in 1944 was appointed Maitre de Conferences at the École Polytechnique by the Provisional Government of Charles de Gaulle.

At around the same period in 1944, Bửu Hội met Antoine Lacassagne, the Director of Biological Research at the Radium Institute. At the time Lacassagne was establishing an interdisciplinary team for exploring the possibilities and uses of a hypothesis by Otto Schmidt, which became known as the electronic theory of hydrocarbon carcinogenesis. One of the effects of the Nazi occupation was that the foreign scientific literature brought into France was almost entirely German. As a result, this exposed Lacassagne to what to be the scientific foundation of his highly fruitful collaboration with Bửu Hội.

At the time, the electronic theory of molecular structure was in its formative years and was not considered as a vehicle by biologists for explaining phenomena, however Lacassagne saw promise in the prospect of Schmidt's hypothesis in attempting to explain carcinogenesis by a combination of elements of electron quantum theory, geometry and chemical structure.

Hội and his team relocated from the Radium Institute to larger facilities at the Institute of Chemistry of Natural Substances in 1960. The new quarters was part of the National Centrer of Scientific Research laboratory group at Gif-sur-Yvette near Paris. In 1962 he was promoted to Director of Research. Around 1967, he established further research groups under his guidance; one at Orléans at the Marcel Delepine Center and a second at the Lannelogue Institute at Vanves.

=== Scientific discoveries ===
His research spread beyond chemical carcinogenesis. He also published widely in organic chemistry, pharmacology, therapeutics, epidemiology and biochemistry. He started his research career with investigations on chaulmoogric and hydnocarpic acids in his Polytechnique laboratory. At the time, these were the only products used for treating leprosy. Within a few years, he had established himself as an international authority in the chemotherapy of the disease. He delineated the role of the cyclopentene ring and its double bond and of the chain length in determining the toxicity and leprostatic activity of these compounds. Although from the time of his 1944 meeting with Lacassagne onwards he was preoccupied with the study of chemical carcinogenesis, he continued to devote substantial effort to the chemotherapy of leprosy and the associated chemotherapy of tuberculosis.

=== Chemical carcinogenesis ===
The overwhelming amount of Bửu Hội's contributions are in the field of chemical carcinogenesis and the synthesis of related organic chemical compounds. In the late 1940s and early 1950s, he had extensive collaborations with the quantum chemistry personnel of the Radium Institute on various aspects of the electronic theory of carcinogenesis. Bửu Hội was the first to propose the involvement of noncovalent forces. Together with Lacassagne and Rudali, in the 1940s he became the first to describe the phenomena of synergisma and antagonism between carcinogens. He demonstrated this by using hydrocarbons on the skin of mice and later extended this to hepatic and other carcinogens. Starting in 1947, he collaborated with François Zajdela and Lacassagne in exploring the relationships between the structure and carcinogenic activity of polynuclear compounds. The study spanned a groundbreaking scale and depth.

These involved the fundamental ring systems and derivatives of 1,2-benzanthracene, the dibenzopyrenes, steranthrenes, anthanthrene, 1,2,3,4-dibenzanthracene, a variety of benzo and dibenzofluoranthenes. This was extended to large-molecular-size and "hypercondensed" hydrocarbons, ring opening and partial hydrogenation. During his study of dibenzopyrenes, he discovered a molecular arrangement involving the framework of aromatic hydrocarbons. His studies of the carcinogenic azulenophenalenes led him to question the role of aromaticity. Aside from his studies with aza-replaced hydrocarbons, benz- and dibenzacridines and –carbazoles, he also synthesised and tested a number of new structural types of heteroaromatics with reference to the nature, number and position of the heteroatoms. These included the naphtho and benzo derivatives of pyridocarbazole and beta-carboline, heteroaromatics with sulfur, arsenic or selenium replacements. These were either alone or in association with nitrogen, as well as sulfur and nitrogen containing pseudoazulenes. A series of hydrocarbon-like polynuclear lactones were explored with the intent of establishing a connection between polynuclear aromatics and aflatoxins. Such studies of heteroatomic polynuclears led him to propose a "newer picture" of a carcinogenic hydrocarbon, helping the generalise the classical K-region hypothesis.

He contributed to studies on the carcinogenicity of 4-nitroquinoline-N-oxide derivatives, the production of plant tumors by a nitrosamine. He also studied metabolism and protein binding of polynuclears and the effect of the binding o DNA replication and transcription, testing the effect of various carcinogens on the hatching of shrimp eggs. From the mid-1960s onwards, Bửu Hội increasingly turned his focus to the structural facets of polynuclears which determine their ability to induce microsomal enzyme synthesis, in particular involving zoxazolamine and dicoumarol hydroxylation. Aside from his study of fundamental organic chemistry, chemical carcinogenesis and chemotherapy of leprosy and tuberculosis, Bửu Hội's team also conducted research into a wide range of issues of biological and therapeutic interest. These included the synthesis and testing anti-inflammatory non-steroid compounds, substituted sex hormones, anti-coagulant substances and their potentiation, antidiabetic agents, treatment of hypertension by methyl-DOPA, antioxidants and the chemophylaxy of aging and the toxicity of dioxine among others.

== Professional appointments ==
In 1947, Hồ Chí Minh named him as the Rector of the University of Hanoi. He later served as science advisor to Diệm and was appointed in 1960 as the Director of the Atomic Energy Establishment of Vietnam. In this capacity, he was a key figure in the establishment of an Atomic Energy Research Center.

== Political pursuits ==
=== Mid 1940s to Early 1960s ===
While in Paris, Bửu Hội had not limited his activities to scientific research. He had worked with Hồ Chí Minh's Vietminh to form the Democratic Republic of Vietnam which sought to establish independence from its formation in September 1945. His international reputation, generated by his scientific achievements, lent prestige to the Hồ Chí Minh government. Hội later broke off ties in 1950 when the Communists imposed a dictatorship on the resistance movement.[12]

In the early 1950s, Bửu Hội traveled to the United States. After the disruption of the Second World War, the president of the American Chemical Society had asked a colleague to resume contact with French chemistry circles by selecting three men regarded to be the outstanding chemists in France. Hội was one of the three selected by the ACS. At the time he was director of research in organic chemistry at the Radium Institute in Paris. Hội accepted the invitation of the ACS to deliver a series of lectures in the United States, where, in 1951, he traveled to the Maryknoll Seminaries in Lakewood, New Jersey to offer his support to Diệm in his quest to form an independent Vietnamese government.[13]

In early 1953, he traveled as a private citizen to the office of the Vietminh in Rangoon, the capital of Burma. Despite leaving the Vietminh three years earlier, his nationalist credentials allowed him to secure an audience. At the time he was the elected president of an association of some 25,000 Vietnamese workers and soldiers stranded in France after the Second World War. He had also been a delegated to the conference at Fontainebleau, the collapse of which had helped to spark the First Indochina War in 1946. Bửu Hội was accompanied by Jacques Raphael-Leygues, a radical socialist politician.

Before departing Paris, Hội had been authorised by French President Vincent Auriol to propose the opening of direct negotiations with France. He left a letter in Rangoon to be delivered to Vietminh leaders, prophetically predicting that this would be the last opportunity for them to deal with France directly without third part interference. He predicted that the United States would eventually intervene with force unprecedented in Vietnam if the situation was not resolved. Neither the French nor the Vietminh made further efforts to pursue negotiations. Years later, French officials blamed domestic political feuds and the lack of support from some sections of their government. The Vietminh blamed logistical difficulties for their late, minimal reply. After the French were defeated at Điện Biên Phủ in early 1954, Vietnam was partitioned at the Geneva Conference.[18] In August 1954, Bửu Hội returned to South Vietnam for a visit. Diem had been named Prime Minister of what was then the French backed State of Vietnam. Vietnam was supposed to be reunified after national elections in 1956 following a temporary partition and transitional phase. Diệm was in trouble as the generals of the Vietnamese National Army disobeyed him and the national police were controlled by the Bình Xuyên, an armed criminal syndicate. Parts of the Mekong Delta were controlled by the private armies of the Cao Đài and Hòa Hảo religious sects.[14]

Hội went to meet Phạm Công Tắc, the pope of the Cao Đài, and his entourage in their stronghold of Tây Ninh west of Saigon near the border with Cambodia. He went to a secret meeting with the Cao Đài general Trình Minh Thế at his base on Núi Bà Đen. Hội went on to meet with the Hòa Hảo in the Delta city of Cần Thơ and also met with Bình Xuyên leaders in Cholon. He further met with labor groups, army officers and representatives of the educated class. Later when the Saigon press was censored and partly shut down, he outlined his vision for Vietnam in the Paris magazine L'Express.[15]

=== Neutralism ===
Bửu Hội advocated a new "government of national solidarity" in Saigon that incorporated the religious sects. This contrasted to Diệm, who wanted to have unchallenged power with the sects in a subservient position. He felt that this would foster reconciliation between non-Communist nationalists in the south. Bửu Hội opposed a military buildup in the south, reasoning that the best defense against insurrection came from fostering popular participation in the administrative and economic institutions of the state. He favoured neutralism in South Vietnam's foreign affairs while remaining on positive terms with France and the United States. He argued that the colonial era and Vietnam's natural place in Asia was to join other nations such as India in a policy of non-alignment. He hoped that both North and South Vietnam could be admitted to the United Nations.

Diệm rejected these moderate policies, believing that a militantly anti-Communist stance was the solution for South Vietnam. This coincided with a fact finding mission by Democratic Party U.S. Senator Mike Mansfield, a Roman Catholic and strong Diệm supporter, who advocated a suspension of U.S. aid if Diệm were removed. L'Express, the newspaper in Paris which printed his ideas, was considered to be friendly with French Prime Minister Pierre Mendès France. As a result, the US State Department interpreted it as a French manoeuvre to replace Diệm with Hội. Strongly disapproving of Hội's foreign policies, the State Department warned Mendes-France that U.S. policy would change if Hội became prime minister.[16]

In 1958, Bửu Hội resumed work for Diệm on the international front. He was charged with attending to the Indian, Canadian and Polish diplomats from the International Control Commission that were charged with monitoring the Geneva Accords which partitioned Vietnam in 1954. He was also assigned the job of securing diplomatic links and greater recognition of the Republic of Vietnam on the international arena. He was named as South Vietnam's ambassador to various countries and several bodies of the United Nations. In addition, he was named as the director of the Vietnam Atomic Energy Center that was constructed near the central highlands resort town of Đà Lạt. It was to be South Vietnam's first nuclear reactor.[17]

=== The Buddhist crisis ===
The Buddhist crisis erupted in August 1963 after the shooting by authorities of nine Buddhists in Huế who were protesting a government ban on the flying of the Buddhist flag on Vesak, the birthday of Gautama Buddha. As civil disobedience and demands for religious equality by the Buddhist majority against Diệm's Catholic government grew, Diệm's forces repeatedly attacked Buddhists. In June, Bửu Hội wrote to Nhu to urge Diệm to further dialogue with the Buddhists and create a Ministry of Religious Affairs.

As Diệm remained intransigent on demands for religious equality and bringing those responsible for the Huế shootings to justice, his forces used chemicals on Buddhist protestors in Huế. The turning point was the self-immolation of Thích Quảng Đức on 11 June at a busy Saigon intersection. As the impasse continued, Hội's mother, who had been a Buddhist nun for many years, traveled from Huế to Saigon. The Buddhist leaders had announced that the mother of South Vietnam's most distinguished scientist and diplomat and member of the royal family, intended to burn herself to death to highlight oppression against Buddhists. The tension grew, and eventually in July, she made an appearance at a press conference at Saigon's Xá Lợi Pagoda, to repeat the threat. Outside, Nhu's men had organised a "spontaneous" demonstration where government supporters had been bussed in.

Concerned for his mother and the deteriorating situation in Vietnam, Hội returned home in attempt to mediate between the Buddhists and Diệm. Rumours began to circulate stating that the Americans wanted Hội inserted in a newly created post of prime minister, in order that the Ngô family's power would be diluted. He spent many hours talking with the Buddhist leader Thích Trí Quang at Xá Lợi to ensure that his mother would not actually self-immolate. The negotiations were fruitless and were futile. Shortly after midnight, the Special Forces of the Army of the Republic of Vietnam loyal to Nhu raided pagodas across the country, vandalising, looting and in some cases detonating them, arresting around 1400 monks and nuns. Up to 400 civilians disappeared or were killed trying to repel the invaders from the temples. Bửu Hội went to Gia Long Palace at the end of August to take leave and return to his laboratory. At the time, the United Nations had been strongly condemning the actions of Diệm's regime. When Nhu told him "Tu me laisse dans la merde" (in French: "You have left me in the shit"), Hội agreed to defend Saigon at the UN in New York on the condition that a fact-finding mission would be allowed to enter the country and freely see the truth for themselves.

=== United States ===
Bửu Hội arrived in New York in the middle of September 1963. The American public had a highly unfavourable view of South Vietnam, due to the self-immolations and pagoda attacks. U Thant, the Buddhist Burmese who was the Secretary General of the United Nations sharply criticised the Vietnamese government, saying that there was no country so chaotic and deteriorating. The campaign against the Diệm regime was overtly led by Ceylon, but Saigon felt that Cambodia had been stirring up animosity among the Asian countries, having already broken off diplomatic relations after the raids. The UN session started on 17 September and Hội met with the U.S. ambassador to the United Nations, Charles Yost, two days later. Bửu Hội contended that the Buddhist movement had transformed into a political movement to overthrow Diệm and claiming that media reports transmitted to America were inaccurate. Yost asserted that irrespective of what was happening, the situation was intolerable and that Diệm had to address it. Bửu Hội thought that implementing the five point plan Diệm signed in June but never intended to implement was the key. Bửu Hội acknowledged that anti-Buddhist discrimination in Vietnam was real. Henry Cabot Lodge Jr., the U.S. Ambassador in Saigon, described Hội's proposed solution as "oversimplified".

Bửu Hội outlined a plan to the United States' representatives to the United Nations to avoid a full-scale debate on South Vietnam in the General Assembly. He revealed that South Vietnam would reject a formal inquiry mission as interference in domestic affairs, but would try to seize the initiative to invite a fact finding mission. He reasoned that such a delegation would spark a rapprochement in Vietnam and would delay debate and condemnation by the Assembly until the mission had tabled its report. Privately he asked the Americans to tell Thích Trí Quang that he would not do anything to harm the Buddhist's cause.

Bửu Hội also visited the U.S. Department of State in Washington where he was given a mixed reception. Harlan Cleveland, the assistance secretary for international organization affairs thought that his "sophisticated" plan and his stature as an intellectual and diplomat would boost his cause. Undersecretary Averell Harriman and Assistant Secretary Roger Hilsman, well-known Diệm critics, were less enthusiastic. Bửu Hội's attempt to break the deadlock in relations since the pagoda raids failed to convince Harriman, who removed his hearing aid when Bửu Hội suggested the pro-Diệm former U.S. ambassador Frederick Nolting still had a positive role to play. When Hilsman criticised the treatment of the Buddhists, Hội asserted that the movement had become political and that the Buddhists had forced Diệm into a fight for survival. Hội parried U.S. calls for Diệm to remove Nhu, regarded as the corrosive influence in South Vietnam, from power. He asserted that Nhu was a great talent but noted that a prime minister should be appointed.

At the UN, the Ceylon delegate had begun to push for a resolution expressing serious concern about "the continuing violation of human rights in Vietnam". Since South Vietnam was not a member and had no right of reply, Bửu Hội and his team lobbied African and Asian countries behind the scene. Hội was also the South Vietnamese ambassador to six African nations. The result was that a polemical address by Ceylon on 7 October did not garner any support. A Soviet Union threat to use the International Control Commission to investigate the South's domestic affairs never materialized, either. The General Assembly voted unanimously to cut short the debate and accept the invitation to send a fact finding mission. Hội had managed to avert censure of his country and an unwanted debate on the role of the U.S. there. Lodge expressed disappointment at why the U.S. delegation helped to avoid a debate that would have condemned Diệm. Despite Hội's assurances that the mission would be free to move around the country and was not a stalling device, Lodge was adamant that Diệm would never allow them to see anything unfavourable.

=== Atomic Energy Center in Da Lat ===
On 28 October, Hội opened the Atomic Energy Center in Đà Lạt in his role as the director general of the Office of Atomic Energy. Diệm said of Hội's work, "In the non-aligned world, we have more friends now, thanks to the diplomatic bases laid by Professor Bửu Hội in Africa." On 31 October, he performed his last public duty in South Vietnam. Hội visited Nhu along with two Buddhist monks and ask him to intervene with Diệm to free "all Buddhist dignitaries, laymen and students till under detention". Nhu "promised to obtain from the president a favourable answer to this request". Diệm and Nhu were assassinated two days later after being deposed in a coup. Hội left Vietnam after the coup to resume his scientific research. He only returned on the occasion of the funeral of his mother.

== Awards ==
Bửu Hội was a multiple laureate of the French Academy of Sciences, the French Academy of Medicine and the French Ministry of Education. His work in cancer research specifically yielded awards from the French Institut National de la Santé et de la Recherche Médicale and the French league against cancer. Despite working for almost his entire academic career in France, he also received awards from the Royal Netherlands Academy of Arts and Sciences and received funding from the US National Cancer Institute.

== Death ==
Hội died of a heart attack on 8 January 1972, his native country still divided and ravaged by civil war. It was only a few weeks after the passing of his research colleague Antoine Lacassagne, ending a prolific partnership described by Cancer Research as a "heroic and important chapter of the study of carcinogenesis". It went on to say that "his death robbed French science of one of its most illustrious figures". He had totaled almost 1100 scientific publications. His body was laid in state for five days in a sanctuary at Rue Gassendi in Paris, where French and Vietnamese alike paid their respects. Hội's stature also allowed him to develop contacts with French President Charles de Gaulle, who favored neutralizing Vietnam in the early 1960s. With the support of Bửu Hội, de Gaulle advised his ambassador in Saigon, Roger Lalouette, to float the concept with Diệm and Nhu.

== Sources ==
- Arcos, Joseph C. (December 1972). "Buu Hoi". Cancer Research. 32: 2856A – 2856D.
- Buttinger, Joseph (1967). Vietnam: A Dragon Embattled. Praeger.
- Buttinger, Joseph (1958). The Smaller Dragon: A Political History of Vietnam. Praeger.
- Cady, John F. (1964). Southeast Asia: Its Historical Development. McGraw Hill.
- Hall, D. G. E. (1981). A History of Southeast Asia. Macmillan. ISBN 0-333-24163-0.
- Hammer, Ellen J. (1955). The Struggle for Indochina, 1940-1955. Palo Alto, California: Stanford University Press.
- Hammer, Ellen J. (1987). A Death in November. E. P. Dutton. ISBN 0-525-24210-4.
- Karnow, Stanley (1997). Vietnam: A history. London: Penguin Books. ISBN 0-670-84218-4.
- Mantienne, Frédéric (October 2003). "The Transfer of Western Military Technology to Vietnam in the Late Eighteenth and Early Nineteenth Centuries: The Case of the Nguyen". Journal of Southeast Asian Studies. 34 (3): 519–34. doi:10.1017/S0022463403000468. S2CID 162778534.
- McLeod, Mark W. (1991). The Vietnamese response to French intervention, 1862-1874. Praeger. ISBN 0-275-93562-0.
- Committee on Foreign Relations (1954). Report on Indochina: Report of Mike Mansfield on a Study Mission to Vietnam, Cambodia [and] Laos. U.S. Government Printing Office.
