= Thiocarlide =

Chemical compound

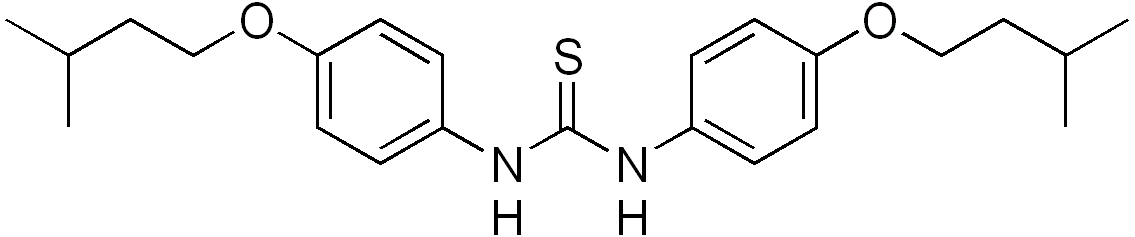

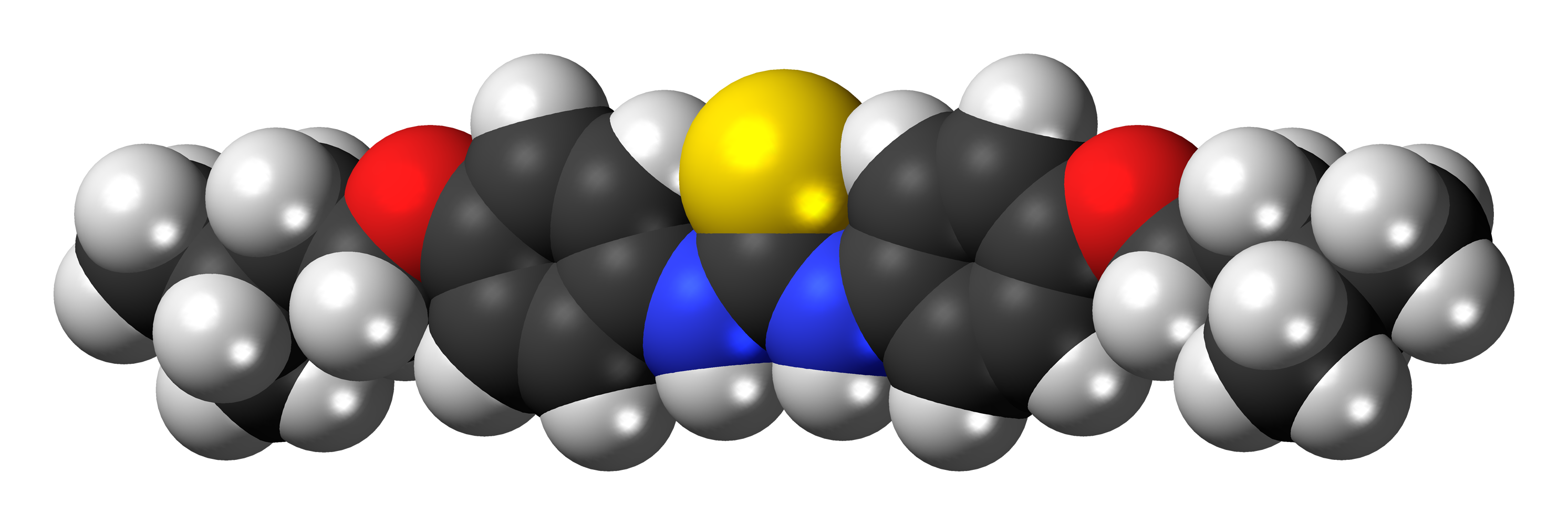

Clinical data
- ATC code: J04AD02 (WHO)

Identifiers
- IUPAC name: 1,3-bis[4-(3-methylbutoxy)phenyl]thiourea
- CAS Number: 910-86-1
- PubChem CID: 3001386
- ChemSpider: 2272774
- UNII: 43M23X81Y2
- KEGG: D07246
- ChEMBL: ChEMBL214920
- CompTox Dashboard (EPA): DTXSID70238358
- ECHA InfoCard: 100.011.824

Chemical and physical data
- Formula: C_{23}H_{32}N_{2}O_{2}S
- Molar mass: 400.58 g·mol^{−1}
- 3D model (JSmol): Interactive image
- SMILES: S=C(Nc1ccc(OCCC(C)C)cc1)Nc2ccc(OCCC(C)C)cc2
- InChI: InChI=1S/C23H32N2O2S/c1-17(2)13-15-26-21-9-5-19(6-10-21)24-23(28)25-20-7-11-22(12-8-20)27-16-14-18(3)4/h5-12,17-18H,13-16H2,1-4H3,(H2,24,25,28); Key:BWBONKHPVHMQHE-UHFFFAOYSA-N

Thiocarlide (or tiocarlide or isoxyl) is a thiourea drug used in the treatment of tuberculosis, inhibiting synthesis of oleic acid and tuberculostearic acid.

Thiocarlide has considerable antimycobacterial activity in vitro and is effective against multi-drug resistant strains of Mycobacterium tuberculosis. Isoxyl inhibits M. bovis with six hours of exposure, which is similar to isoniazid and ethionamide, two other prominent anti-TB drugs. Unlike these two drugs, however, isoxyl also partially inhibits the synthesis of fatty acids.

Thiocarlide was developed by a Belgian company, Continental Pharma S.A. Belgo-Canadienne in Brussels, Belgium. The head researcher was Professor N. P. Buu-Hoi, head of Continental Pharma's Research Division.
