= C16H28O2 =

The molecular formula C_{16}H_{28}O_{2} (molar mass: 252.39 g/mol, exact mass: 252.2089 u) may refer to:

- Cioteronel
- Hydnocarpic acid
