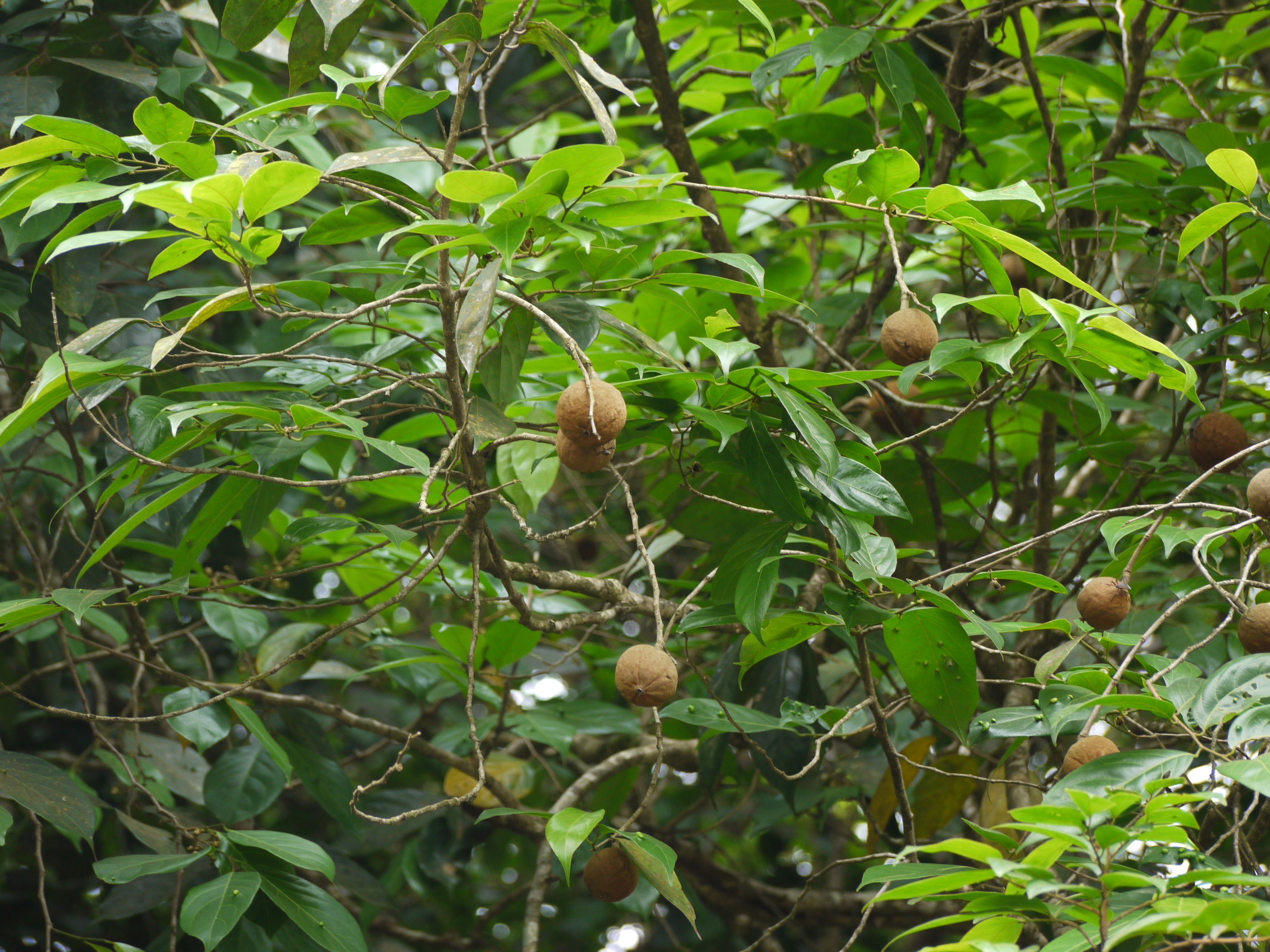

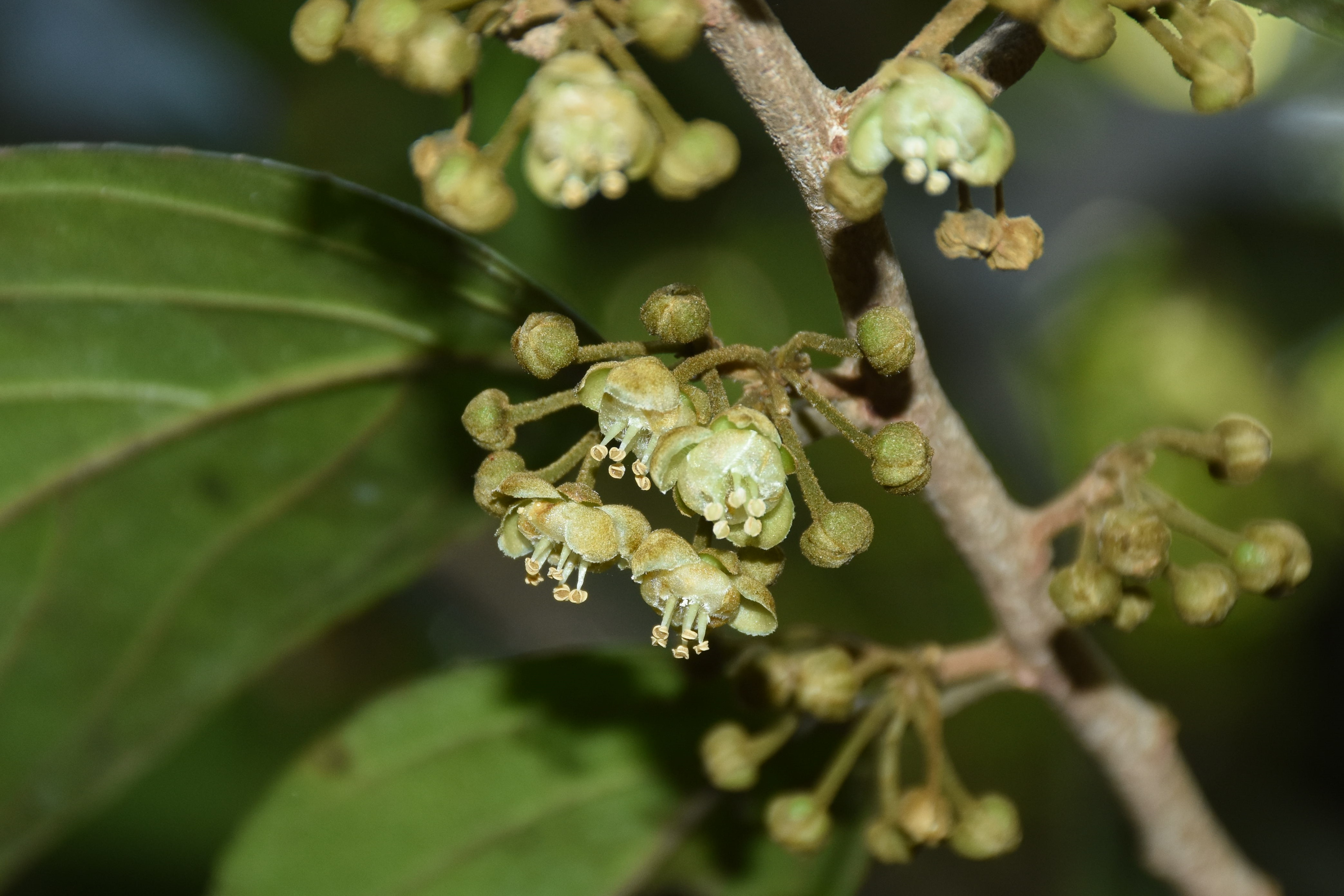
- Detail of flowers

Conservation status
- Vulnerable (IUCN 3.1)

Scientific classification
- Kingdom: Plantae
- Clade: Tracheophytes
- Clade: Angiosperms
- Clade: Eudicots
- Clade: Rosids
- Order: Malpighiales
- Family: Achariaceae
- Genus: Hydnocarpus
- Species: H. pentandrus

Binomial name
- Hydnocarpus pentandrus (Buch.-Ham.) Oken

Synonyms
- Chilmoria pentandra Buch.-Ham.; Hydnocarpus laurifolius Sleumer; Hydnocarpus wightianus Blume; Munnicksia laurifolia Dennst.

= Hydnocarpus pentandrus =

Species of tree

Hydnocarpus pentandrus (previously Hydnocarpus wightianus) or chaulmoogra is a medium-sized tree in the family Achariaceae. This dioecious tree grows up to 10m tall, in moist deciduous forests of Western Ghats in India.

Hydnocarpus wightiana seed oil has been widely used in traditional Indian medicine, especially in Ayurveda, and in Chinese traditional medicine for the treatment of leprosy. It entered early Western medicine in the nineteenth century before the era of sulfonamides and other antibiotics for the treatment of several skin diseases and leprosy. The oil was prescribed for leprosy as a mixture suspended in gum or as an emulsion.

== Common names ==
Common name: Jangli almond

- Hindi: कालमोगरा Calmogara, Chalmogra, Chaulmoogra, Jangli badam
- Kannada: Chalmogra yenne mara, Mirolhakai, Surti, Suranti, Toratti, Garudaphala
- Malayalam: Kodi, Maravatty, Marotti, Nirvatta, Nirvetti
- Marathi: Kadu Kawath
- Sanskrit: Tuvaraka, Turveraka, Tuvrak, कुष्टवैरी Kushtavairi
- Tamil: Maravetti, Maravattai, Marotti
- Telugu: Niradi-vittulu

== Habitat ==
In India: It grows in tropical forests along western Ghats, along the coast from Maharashtra to Kerala, Assam, Tripura, often planted on road sides in hilly areas.

Other countries: The tree is found in South East Asia, chiefly in the Indo-Malayan region, and cultivated in Sri Lanka, Nigeria and Uganda.

== Morphology ==
This is a semi-deciduous tree which grows up to 10 m (33 ft) tall. Bark is brownish, fissured; blaze pinkish. Branchlets are round, minutely velvet-hairy. Leaves are simple, alternate, carried on 0.7–2.2 cm (0.28–0.87 in) long stalks. Leaves are 8 cm–23 cm × 3.5 cm–10 cm (3.1 in–9.1 in × 1.4 in–3.9 in), usually oblong to elliptic-oblong, tip long-pointed, often falling off, base narrow, margin toothed, papery, hairless. Midrib is raised above, secondary nerves 5–7 pairs. Its flowers have greenish white petals and are borne in short cymes or racemes, or sometimes appear by themselves in leaf axils. The flowering takes place from January to April. Its berries are woody, round, tomentose, about 6–10 cm (2.4–3.9 in) in diameter, and start off black when young but become brown when they mature. They have numerous seeds.

Trees of the species that yield chaulmoogra oil grow to a height of 12–15 m (39–49 ft) and in India, trees bear fruits in August and September. The fruits are ovoid some 10 cm (3.9 in) in diameter with a thick woody rind. Internally, they contain 10–16 black seeds embedded in the fruit pulp. The seeds account for some 20% of the fruit weight. A typical tree produces 20 kg (44 lb) of seed/annum. The kernels make up 60–70% of the seed weight and contain 63% of pale yellow oil (mukherjee).

Flowers- unisexual, greenish yellow, sepals - 5, petals - 5, stamens - 5 to 15.

== Chaulmoogra oil ==
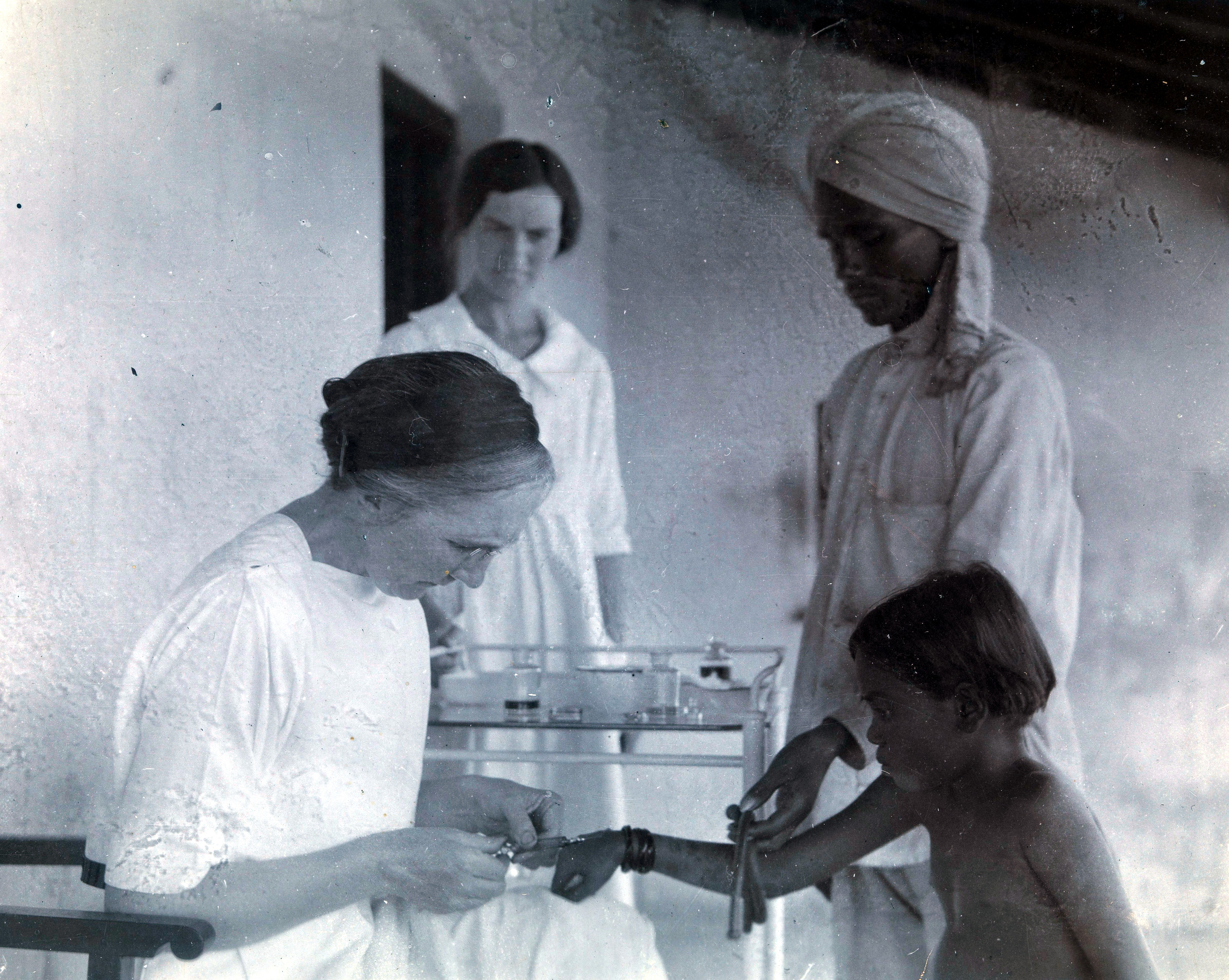
Dr Isabel Kerr administering Chaulmoogra

The oil from the seeds of Hydnocarpus pentandrus has been widely used in various forms of traditional Indian medicine and in Chinese traditional medicine for the treatment of leprosy. The oil was introduced into England by Frederic J. Mouat, and it was used in its raw form both as topical and internal medicine.

The chemical constituents of the oil were analyzed for their potential pharmacological activity by Frederick Belding Power, working for Wellcome Chemical Research Laboratories, in 1904. Power and colleagues isolated hydnocarpic acid, which has the formula C_{16}H_{28}O_{2}, from seeds of both the Hydnocarpus wightiana and Hydnocarpus anthelmintica trees. They introduced the extract into medical usage until sulfones and antibiotics became more dominant in the treatment of several skin diseases and leprosy. It was Alice Ball, however, whose groundbreaking experiments led to the first effective cure for leprosy by making the oil soluble in water and thus injectable.

=== Physical characteristics and composition ===
The oil is semi-solid at room temperature with no odor. Gas–liquid chromatography analysis has shown the oil to contain the following fatty acids—hydnocarpic acid, chaulmoogric acid, gorlic acid, lower cyclic homologues, myristic acid, palmitic acid, stearic acid, palmitoleic acid, oleic acid, linoleic acid, and linolenic acid. The oil is unusual in not being made up of straight chain fatty acids but acids with a cyclic group at the end of the chain. The oil also contains 5′-methoxyhydnocarpin, an amphipathic weak acid, and isohydnocarpin.

The crude oil has a pale greenish-brown color, and can be easily purified into a white, watery oil containing three cyclopentene fatty acids.

Table: fatty acid composition of oil

Acid	H. kurzil	H. wightiana	H. odorata
Hydnocarpic acid	23.0	22.9	..
Chaulmoogric acid	19.6	35.0	..
Gorlic acid	25.1	12.8	..
Lower cyclic homologs	0.3	4.6	..
Myristic acid (C14:0)	0.6	0.8	0.4
Palmitic acid (C16:0)	8.4	5.6	11.8
Stearic acid (C18:0)	1.6	4.7	..
Palmitoleic acid (C16:1)	6.0	0.5	
Oleic acid (C18:1)	5.4	3.6	21.8
Linoleic acid (C18:2)	1.6	1.8	29.3
Linolenic acid (C18:3)	..	..	31.2

Table of physical properties of oil

Property	Range
Refractive index, at 40^{0}C	1.472-1.476
Iodine value	98–103
Saponification value	198–204
Acid value	Max. 25.0%
Melting point	20–25 °C
Specific gravity (at 25 °C)	0.950-.960

=== Extraction ===
Seeds are ovoid, irregular and angular, 1 to 1 1/4 inches long, 1 inch wide, skin smooth, grey, brittle; kernel oily and dark brown. A fatty oil is obtained by expression, known officially as gynocardia oil in Britain, as oleum chaulmoograe in the United States.

Fruits are plucked by climbing the tree or using long sticks with a sickle tied to it. The fruits are peeled by knife and the seeds are washed in water and then dried in the sun. Seeds are decorticated (dehusked) by mallet, hand hammer, or decorticator. They may also be crushed in an expeller and rotary. The kernels yield 43% oil. The extracted oil is stored in zinc barrels until exported.

=== Leprosy ===
Chalomoogra fruit has a long history in Ayurvedic medicine and other traditional Asian medicine as a treatment for leprosy, and was introduced to Western medicine in the mid-19th century.

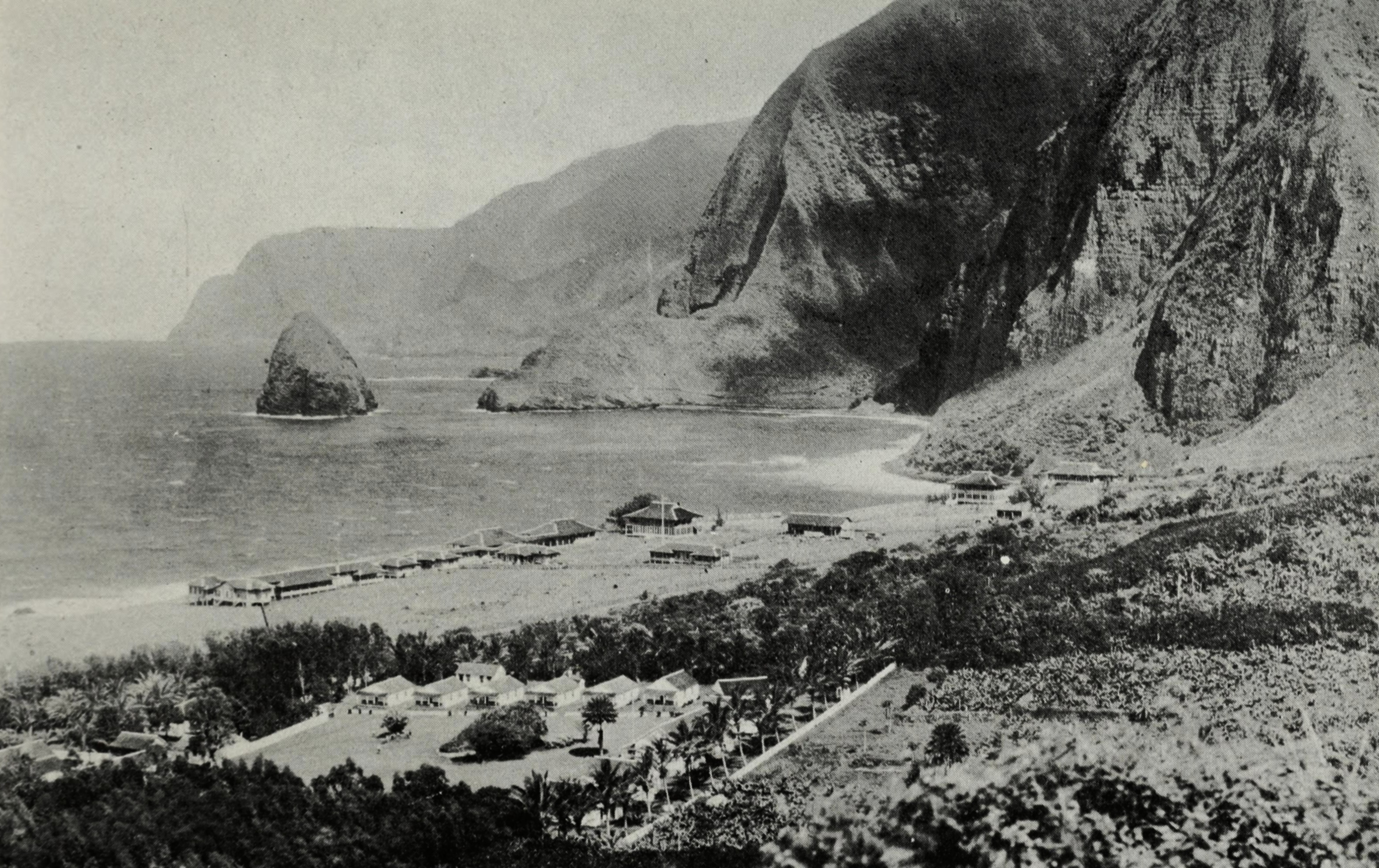
The Molokai island in Hawaii once the "Land of the Living Death," where lepers were treated with remarkable success by the then new chaulmoogra oil. Photo from 1922.

Chaulmoogra oil was commonly used in the early 20th century for the treatment of leprosy. It was applied topically (which was ineffective) or taken internally (more effective but nauseating and often rejected by people as worse than leprosy). The ingredient that appears to produce antimicrobial activity is hydnocarpic acid, a lipophilic compound. It may act by being an antagonist of biotin. American researcher Victor Heiser worked on developing a method of using the oil against leprosy by intravenous or intramuscular injection. The effectiveness of Chaulmoogra oil as a treatment was highly controversial, while some doctors regarded it as effective, others regarded it as an ineffective treatment.

An ethyl ester of the oil (the "Ball method") was developed by Alice Ball in 1916, who died suddenly before publishing the technique. Her work was stolen by Arthur L. Dean who began producing large quantities of the treatment and named it after himself.

It was then produced and marketed by Burroughs Wellcome (modern GlaxoSmithKline) in the early 1920s. The oil preparations were used intravenously for lepers. The oil was often obtained directly from trees in India, Sri Lanka or Africa. Doctors would locally prepare ethyl esters for treatments. In June 1927, Burroughs Wellcome released the commercial preparation – sodium hydnocarpate marketed as Alepol – which produced few unpleasant side effects. In May 1928, doctors reported cure of leprosy in some people treated with Alepol. In the 1940s, chaulmoogra oil was replaced by the more effective sulfones.

== See also ==
- Trees of India
