= Alice Ball =

Black American chemist (1892–1916)

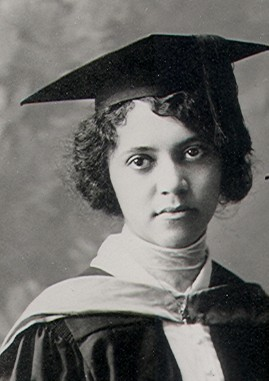
- Ball in 1915
- Born: Alice Augusta Ball; July 24, 1892; Seattle, Washington
- Died: December 31, 1916 (aged 24); U.S.
- Education: University of Hawaiʻi; University of Washington
- Known for: Treatment of leprosy
- Scientific career
- Fields: Chemistry

Alice Augusta Ball (July 24, 1892 – December 31, 1916) was a Black American chemist whose groundbreaking work produced the first effective treatment for Hansen's disease, better known as leprosy. She was born in Seattle, Washington, to James Presley Ball Jr. and Laura Louise Ball. Her father was a photographer, journalist, and lawyer, while her mother left a photography career to raise the family. Ball excelled academically, graduating from Seattle High School with strong interests in the sciences.

She continued her education at the University of Washington, earning a pharmaceutical chemistry degree in 1912 and a bachelor's degree in pharmacy in 1914. During her studies, she co-authored a research paper on benzoylation reactions published in the Journal of the American Chemical Society, making her one of the first Black American women to publish in a major scientific journal. Ball earned a scholarship to the College of Hawaiʻi (now University of Hawaiʻi), where she completed a master's degree in chemistry in 1915, becoming the first woman and first Black American to achieve the degree, and was subsequently appointed as the college's first female chemistry instructor.

While working in Hawaiʻi, Ball was approached by Harry T. Hollmann of the Leprosy Investigation Station, who sought help improving the therapeutic use of chaulmoogra oil, a traditional but highly ineffective treatment for leprosy. The disease carried a severe stigma, with patients often being forcibly isolated in remote settlements with horrible conditions. Though chaulmoogra oil had shown potential for centuries, its extreme viscosity and poor absorption made it nearly impossible to administer effectively. Ingested doses caused nausea and vomiting, while injectable forms caused painful lesions under the skin.

Ball's critical innovation was developing a method to chemically modify chaulmoogra oil's fatty acids into ethyl esters, making the compound water-soluble and suitable for injection. This process, later called the "Ball Method," allowed the drug to be absorbed into the bloodstream safely and efficiently, overcoming the problems that had prevented earlier use. By 1920, health authorities in Hawaiʻi reported that many patients who received the Ball Method were able to return home, rather than remain in lifelong quarantine.

Ball died unexpectedly in 1916 at age 24 before she could publish her findings. After her death, others took credit for her work, but later scholarship and institutional recognition restored her legacy. The Ball Method itself became medically obsolete after the 1946 development of a monotherapy using dapsone. The technique is historically significant, marking a turning point between early botanical medicine and modern pharmaceutical chemistry. Ball's innovation improved medical outcomes for thousands of patients worldwide.

== Early life and education ==
Alice Augusta Ball was born on July 24, 1892, in Seattle, Washington, to James Presley Ball and Laura Louise (Howard) Ball. She was the third of four children, with two older brothers, William and Robert, and a younger sister, Addie. Her family was middle-class and well-off, as Ball's father was a newspaper editor of The Colored Citizen, photographer, and lawyer. Her mother also worked as a photographer. Her grandfather, James Ball Sr., was a photographer, and one of the first Black Americans to make use of daguerreotype, the process of printing photographs onto metal plates. Some researchers have suggested that her parents and grandfather's love for photography may have played a role in her love for chemistry, as they worked with mercury vapors and iodine-sensitized silver plates to develop photos. Despite being prominent members and advocates of the African-American community, both of Ball's parents are listed as "White" on her birth certificate. This may have been an attempt to reduce the prejudice and racism their daughter would face and help her "pass" in white society.

Alice Ball and her family moved from Seattle to Honolulu in 1902, where she attended Central Grammar School (formerly and once again called Princess Ruth Keʻelikōlani Middle School). Her family moved to Hawaii with the hopes that the warmer weather would ease her grandfather's arthritis, though he died shortly after the move. In 1905 they relocated back to Seattle after only three years in Hawaii. After returning to Seattle, Ball attended Seattle High School, where she was an active participant in her school's drama club and was known for her quick wit and ambitious personality. She graduated from this school in 1910, receiving top grades in the sciences.

Ball went on to study chemistry at the University of Washington, earning a degree in pharmaceutical chemistry in 1912, and a bachelor's degree in the science of pharmacy two years later in 1914. Alongside her pharmacy instructor, Williams Dehn, she co-published a 10-page article, "Benzoylations in Ether Solution", in the Journal of the American Chemical Society in 1914. Publishing an article in a respected scientific journal was an uncommon accomplishment for a woman, especially for a Black woman at this time. Ball became the first African American to have her work included in a publication from that journal.

After graduating, Ball was offered many scholarships. She received an offer from the University of California Berkeley, as well as the College of Hawaii (now the University of Hawaiʻi), where she decided to study for a master's degree in chemistry. At the College of Hawaii, her master's thesis, titled "The Chemical Constituents of Piper methysticum; or The Chemical Constituents of the Active Principle of the Ava Root" involved studying the chemical properties of the Kava plant species (Piper methysticum). Endemic to Oceania and common throughout Polynesia, this plant was used in the treatment of anxiety, headaches, kidney disorders, and other hyperactive illnesses. Because of this research and her understanding of the chemical makeup of plants, she was later approached by Harry T. Hollmann, who was an acting assistant surgeon at the Leprosy Investigation Station of the U. S. Public Health Service in Hawaii, to study chaulmoogra oil and its chemical properties. Chaulmoogra oil had been the best treatment available for leprosy for hundreds of years, and Ball developed a much more effective injectable form. In 1915 she became the first woman and first Black American to graduate with a master's degree from the College of Hawaii. She was also the first African-American "research chemist and instructor" in the College of Hawaii's chemistry department.

== Treatment for leprosy ==
At the University of Hawaiʻi, Ball investigated the chemical makeup and active principle of Piper methysticum (kava) for her master's thesis. Because of this work, she was contacted by Harry T. Hollmann at Kalihi Hospital in Hawaii, who needed an assistant for his research into the treatment of leprosy.

At the time, leprosy, or Hansen's Disease, was a highly stigmatized disease with virtually no chance of recovery. Over the course of 103 years, starting in 1866 until 1969, over 8,000 patients diagnosed with leprosy were exiled to the Hawaiian island of Molokai on the Kalaupapa peninsula, with the expectation that they would die there. Most of these people were Native Hawaiians, while the Haole people were allowed to leave the islands and pursue more extensive treatment on the mainland. Since they lacked an acquired immunity, the native population was especially susceptible to leprosy, with the first case appearing in 1835. The best treatment available was chaulmoogra oil, from the seeds of the Hydnocarpus wightianus tree from the Indian subcontinent, which had been used medicinally from as early as the 1300s. But Western treatment developed by British physician Frederic John Moaut in 1854 was not very effective, and every method of application had problems. It was too sticky to be effectively used topically, and as an injection the oil's viscous consistency caused it to clump under the skin and form blisters rather than being absorbed. These blisters formed in perfect rows and made it look "as if the patient's skin had been replaced by bubble wrap". Ingesting the oil was not effective either because it had an acrid taste that often induced vomiting.

Ball developed a technique to make the oil injectable and water-soluble. Her technique involved saponifying fatty acids to form chaulmoogric acid, transforming the acid into its ethyl ester, producing a substance that retains the oil's therapeutic properties while being more stable in an aqueous suspension. Ball was unable to publish her findings before her death in 1916. Arthur L. Dean, a chemist and Ball's graduate study advisor, dean of the college, and later president of the university, was privy to details of the process she developed. After Ball's death, Dean undertook further trials and by 1919, a college chemistry laboratory was producing large quantities of the injectable chaulmoogra extract. Dean published details of the work and the findings without acknowledging Ball as the originator or crediting her work. Her name is not mentioned in any of Dean's published works on the chaulmoogra extract, while the name "the Dean method" is appended to the technique.

In 1920, a Hawaii physician reported in the Journal of the American Medical Association that 78 patients had been discharged from Kalihi Hospital by the board of health examiners after treatment with injections of Ball's modified chaulmoogra oil. In Ball's Method, ethyl esters of the fatty acids found in chaulmoogra oil were prepared into a form suitable for injection and absorption into the circulation. While not curative or able to fully halt the disease's progress indefinitely, the isolated ethyl ester remained the only available, effective treatment for leprosy until sulfonamide drugs were developed in the 1940s.

Ball's colleague Hollmann attempted to correct the mistaken impression of the extract's development. He published a paper in 1922 giving credit to Ball, calling the injectable form of the oil the "Ball method" throughout the article. Hollmann discusses techniques developed elsewhere and reports progress in related leprosy treatments. Although Dean had contended that his later work was a refinement of Ball's method, Hollmann rejects this.

I cannot see that there is any improvement whatsoever over the original technic as worked out by Miss Ball. The original method will allow any physician in any asylum for lepers in the world, with a little study, to isolate and use the ethyl esters of chaulmoogra fatty acids in treating his cases, while the complicated distillation in vacuo will require very delicate, and not always obtainable, apparatus.

— Harry T. Hollmann, "The Fatty Acids of Chaulmoogra Oil in the Treatment of Leprosy and Other Diseases", Archives of Dermatology and Syphilology (1922; 5: pages 94–101)

Ball nevertheless remained largely forgotten in the scientific record. In the 1970s, Kathryn Takara and Stanley Ali, professors at the University of Hawaiʻi, found records of Ball's research and made efforts to ensure her achievement was recognized. In the 1990s, Ali came across The Samaritans of Molokai, a 1932 book that specifically mentioned and recognized the contributions of a young chemist, later identified as Ball.

== Death and recognition ==
Ball died on December 31, 1916, at age 24. She had become ill during her research and returned to Seattle for treatment a few months before her death. A 1917 Pacific Commercial Advertiser article suggested that the cause may have been chlorine poisoning due to exposure while teaching in the laboratory. One hypothesis was that she had given a demonstration on how to properly use a gas mask in preparation for an attack, as World War I was continuing in Europe. Chlorine poisoning was stated on her death certificate as speculation, without a definite cause of death.

The first recognition of Ball's work came six years after her death when, in 1922, she was mentioned in Harry T. Hollmann's article, with her method being called the "Ball Method". After the work of many historians at the University of Hawaiʻi including Kathryn Takara and Stanley Ali, the University of Hawaiʻi honored Ball in 2000 by dedicating a plaque to her on the school's only chaulmoogra tree behind Bachman Hall. In 2004, Paul Wermager of the University of Hawaiʻi quoted a 1921 interview with Dean in the newspaper Paradise of the Pacific, in which Dean emphasized the importance of the work of his predecessors in the development of the extract. Despite this, according to Wermager, the report "mention[s] Hollmann and other colleagues", but not Ball. In 2007, the University Board of Regents honored Ball with a Medal of Distinction, the school's highest honor.

In March 2016, Hawaiʻi Magazine placed Ball on its list of the most influential women in Hawaiian history. Paul Wermager established a scholarship, in 2017, called the "Alice Augusta Ball endowed scholarship" for students pursuing degrees in chemistry, biology, biochemistry, or microbiology. In 2018, a new park in Seattle's Greenwood neighborhood was named after Ball. In 2019, the London School of Hygiene and Tropical Medicine added her name to the frieze atop its main building, along with Florence Nightingale and Marie Curie, in recognition of their contributions to science and global health research.

In February 2020, a short film, The Ball Method premiered at the Pan African Film Festival. In 2000, a University of Hawaiʻi student association leader, Pi'ilani Smith, called for Dean Hall to be renamed with Ball's name, and researcher into Ball's career Stan Ali called for a university laboratory to be named after Ball. As of 2022, the student government at the university continued to call for Dean Hall (the earth sciences building) to be renamed "Alice Ball Hall".

On November 6, 2020, a satellite named after Ball (ÑuSat 9 or "Alice", COSPAR 2020-079A) was launched.

On February 28, 2022, Hawaii Governor David Ige signed a proclamation declaring February 28 "Alice Augusta Ball Day" in Hawaii at a special recognition ceremony on the University of Hawaiʻi at Mānoa campus. The ceremony took place next to Bachman Hall in the shade of a chaulmoogra tree planted in Ball's honor. More than 100 people attended, including First Lady Dawn Ige and UH President David Lassner. In December 2024, after a resolution by the UH Mānoa Faculty Senate, a bust sculpture of Ball was placed in the Hamilton Library.

== See also ==
- Beebe Steven Lynk
- List of African-American inventors and scientists
- Marie Curie
