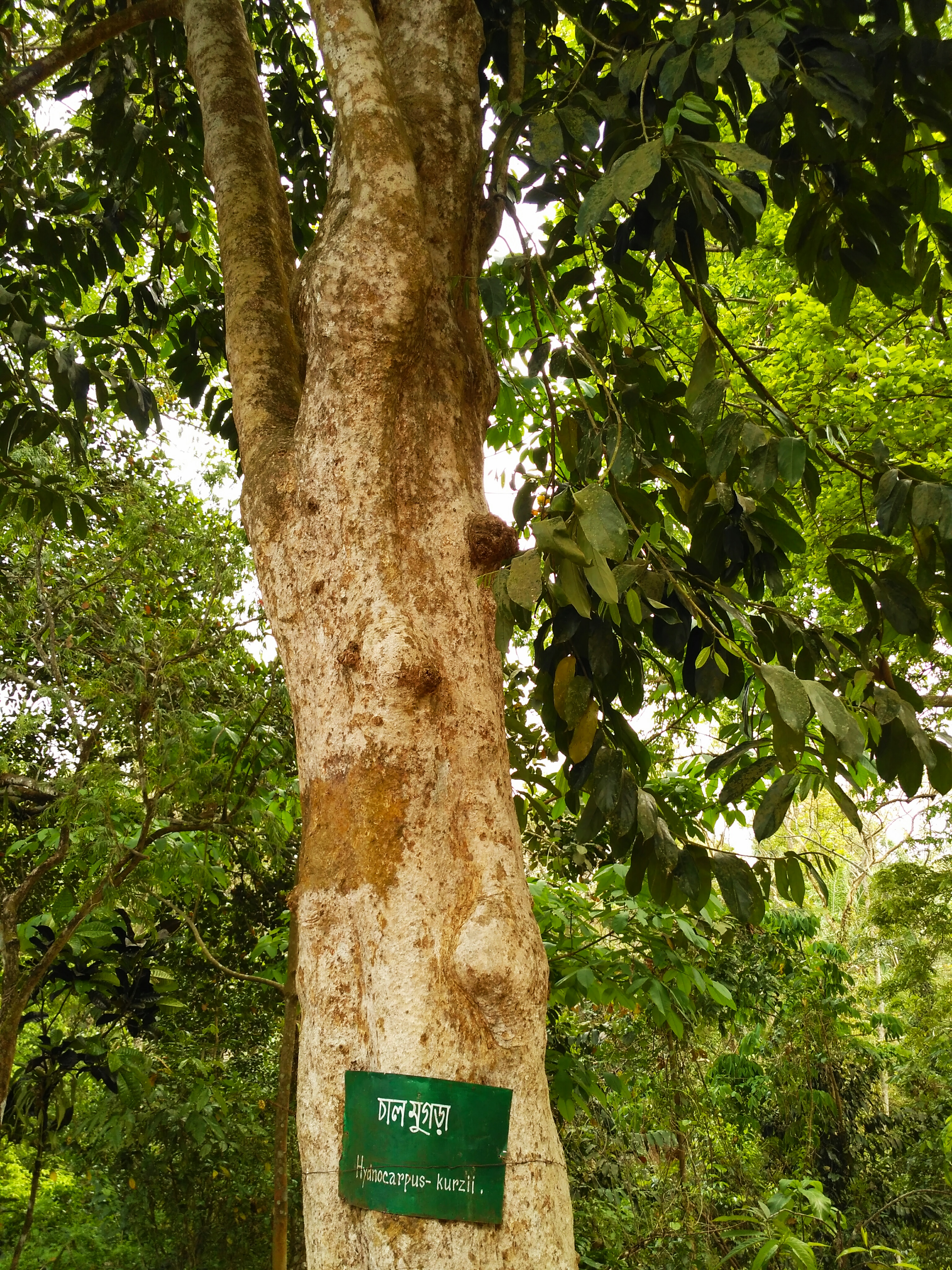

Conservation status
- Data Deficient (IUCN 2.3)

Scientific classification
- Kingdom: Plantae
- Clade: Tracheophytes
- Clade: Angiosperms
- Clade: Eudicots
- Clade: Rosids
- Order: Malpighiales
- Family: Achariaceae
- Genus: Hydnocarpus
- Species: H. kurzii

Binomial name
- Hydnocarpus kurzii (King) Warb.

Synonyms
- Taraktogenos kurzii King; Hydnocarpus kurzii subsp. australis Sleumer; Hydnocarpus kurzii f. latifolius N.Mukh.

= Hydnocarpus kurzii =

Species of flowering plant

Hydnocarpus kurzii is a species of flowering plant in the family Achariaceae. It is found in India and Myanmar. It is used as a traditional medicinal plant.

Working for Wellcome Chemical Research Laboratories, the pharmacist Frederick B. Power studied the seeds of various species of chaulmoogra from 1904. Power and colleagues identified chaulmoogric acid, which has the formula C_{18}H_{32}O_{2}, from seeds of what was then called the Taraktogenos kurzii tree.
