= Hydnocarpus cucurbitina =

Conservation status
- Conservation Dependent (IUCN 2.3)

Scientific classification
- Kingdom: Plantae
- Clade: Tracheophytes
- Clade: Angiosperms
- Clade: Eudicots
- Clade: Rosids
- Order: Malpighiales
- Family: Achariaceae
- Genus: Hydnocarpus
- Species: H. cucurbitinus

Binomial name
- Hydnocarpus cucurbitinus King

Synonyms
- Hydnocarpus cucurbitina

Species of tree

Hydnocarpus cucurbitinus is a species of plant in the Achariaceae family. It is a tree endemic to Peninsular Malaysia. It is threatened by habitat loss.
