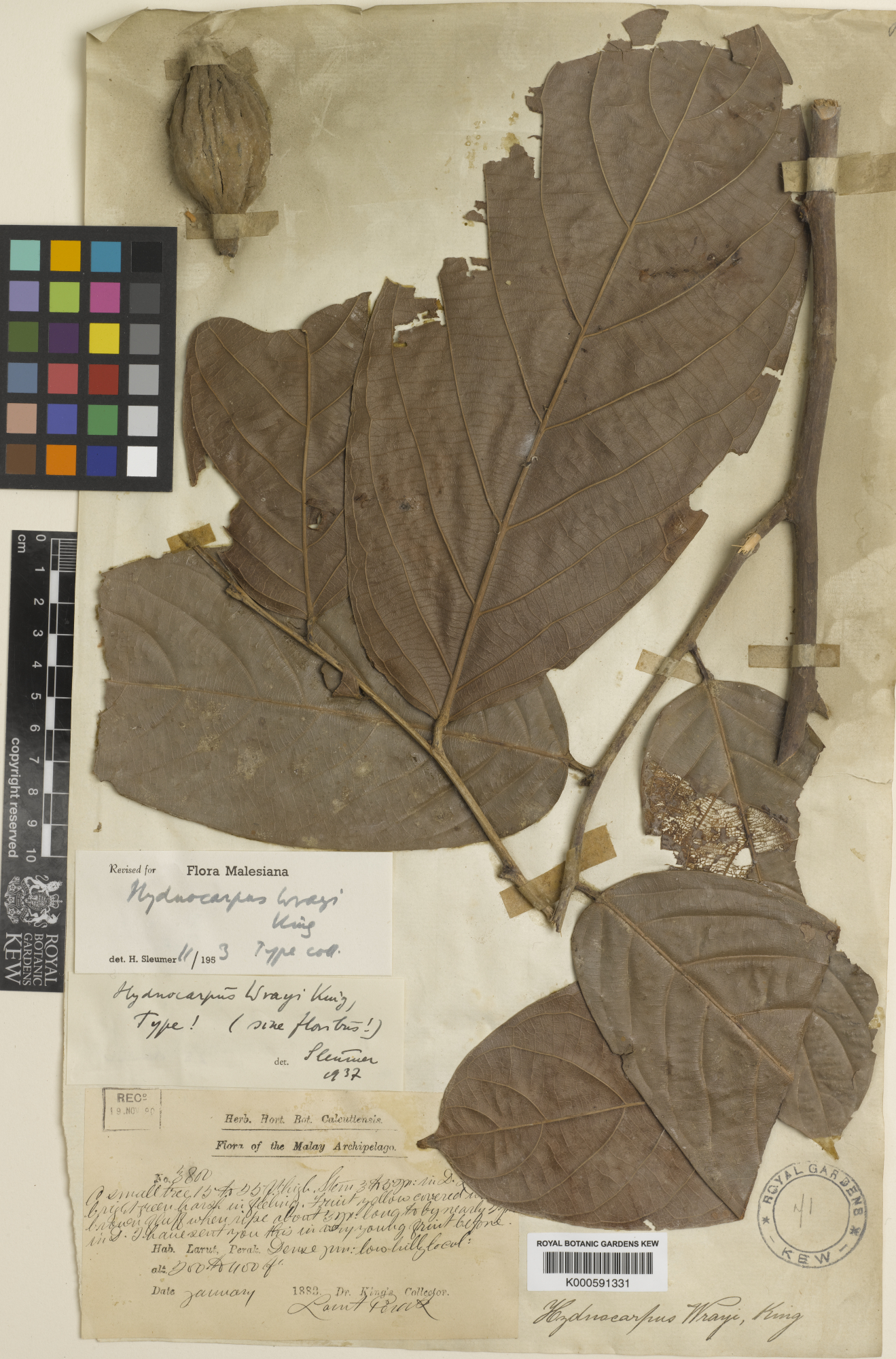

Scientific classification
- Kingdom: Plantae
- Clade: Tracheophytes
- Clade: Angiosperms
- Clade: Eudicots
- Clade: Rosids
- Order: Malpighiales
- Family: Achariaceae
- Genus: Hydnocarpus
- Species: H. wrayi

Binomial name
- Hydnocarpus wrayi King

= Hydnocarpus wrayi =

Species of tree

Hydnocarpus wrayi is a species of plant in the Achariaceae family. It is found in Peninsular Malaysia and Borneo.
