= Hydnocarpus hainanensis =

Conservation status
- Vulnerable (IUCN 2.3)

Scientific classification
- Kingdom: Plantae
- Clade: Tracheophytes
- Clade: Angiosperms
- Clade: Eudicots
- Clade: Rosids
- Order: Malpighiales
- Family: Achariaceae
- Genus: Hydnocarpus
- Species: H. hainanensis

Binomial name
- Hydnocarpus hainanensis (Merr.) Sleumer

Species of flowering plant

Hydnocarpus hainanensis is a species of plant in the Achariaceae family. It is found in China and Vietnam. It is threatened by habitat loss.
