= Frederick Belding Power =

American chemist

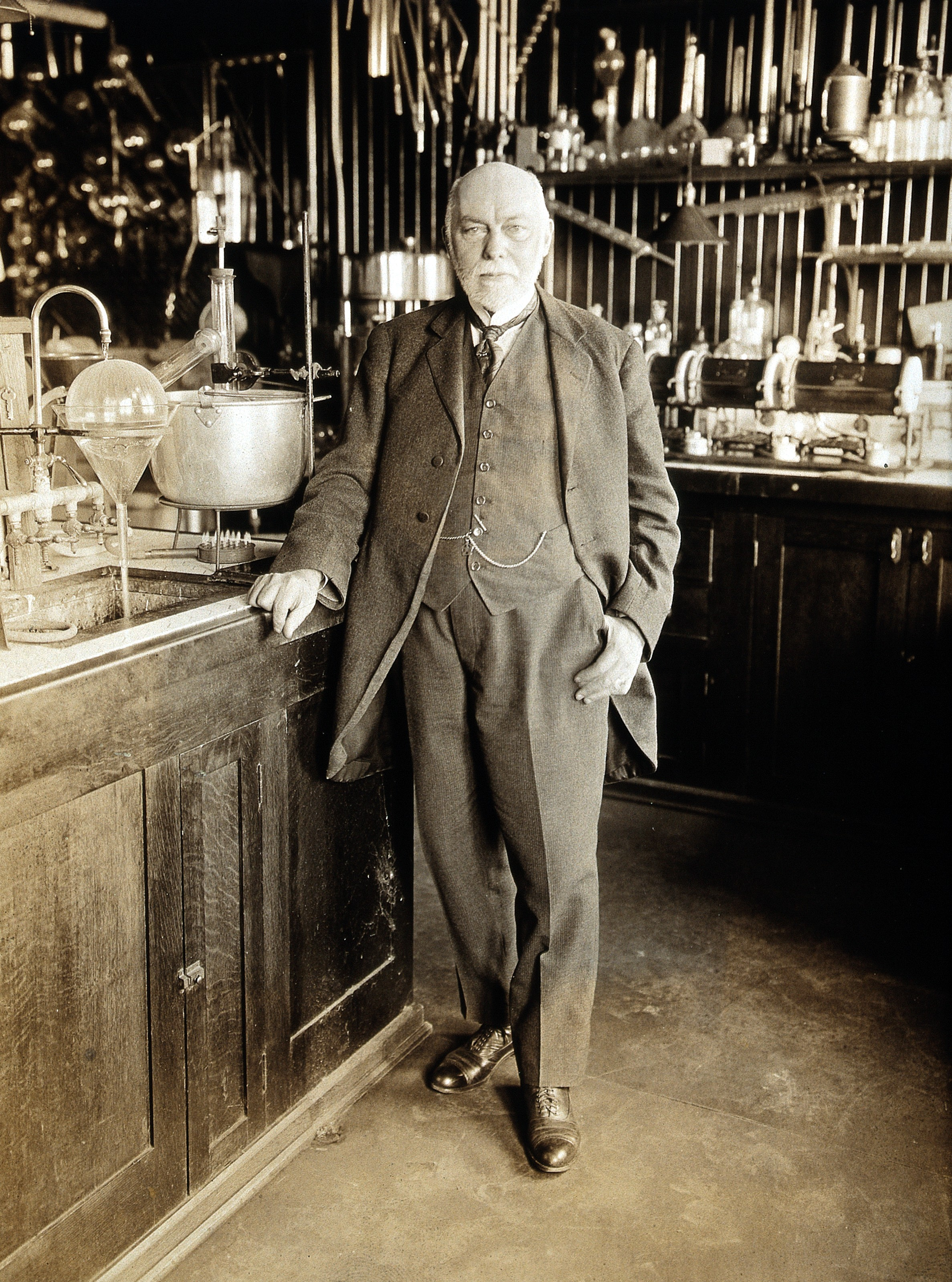
Power in 1921

Frederick Belding Power (4 March 1853 – 26 March 1927) was an American chemist who worked in pharmacology, plant chemicals, and on standards in pharmaceutical production. He served as a professor of pharmacy at the Philadelphia College and as director of pharmacy at the University of Wisconsin–Madison. He also served as a chemist for the Wellcome Chemical Research Laboratories in London where he examined Chaulmoogra oil and its use in the treatment of leprosy.

== Early life and education ==
Power was born in Hudson, New York to Thomas and Caroline Belding Power. He went to the Hudson Academy and then worked at a local pharmacy. He moved to Chicago, hoping to enrol at the Chicago College of Pharmacy but the Great Fire of 1871 struck and Power instead moved to Philadelphia where he worked with Edward Parrish before joining college and graduating in chemistry in 1874.

== Career ==
Power worked at the University of Strasbourg under Friedrich A. Flückiger in 1876 and obtained a PhD in 1880. He then became a professor at the Philadelphia College of Pharmacy. He coauthored A Manual of Chemical Analysis along with Frederick Hoffmann. In 1883 he moved to the University of Wisconsin-Madison as director of the department of pharmacy. He resigned in 1892 and worked at Fritzsche Brothers as science director.

In 1896, following the death of his wife, Power moved to London, where he was hired by Henry Wellcome to serve as chief scientific chemist at the newly founded chemical research laboratories. He began to examine the constituents of plant-based medications including an analysis of Chaulmoogra oil, which was noted for its use in traditional Indian medicine as a treatment for leprosy. With the outbreak of World War I, he resigned and returned to the US in 1914. He then joined the US Department of Agriculture phytochemical laboratory. He was elected to the National Academy of Sciences in 1924.

== Personal life ==
Power married Mary Van Loan Meigs in 1883 and they had two children. Mary died during childbirth along with a third child in 1894.
