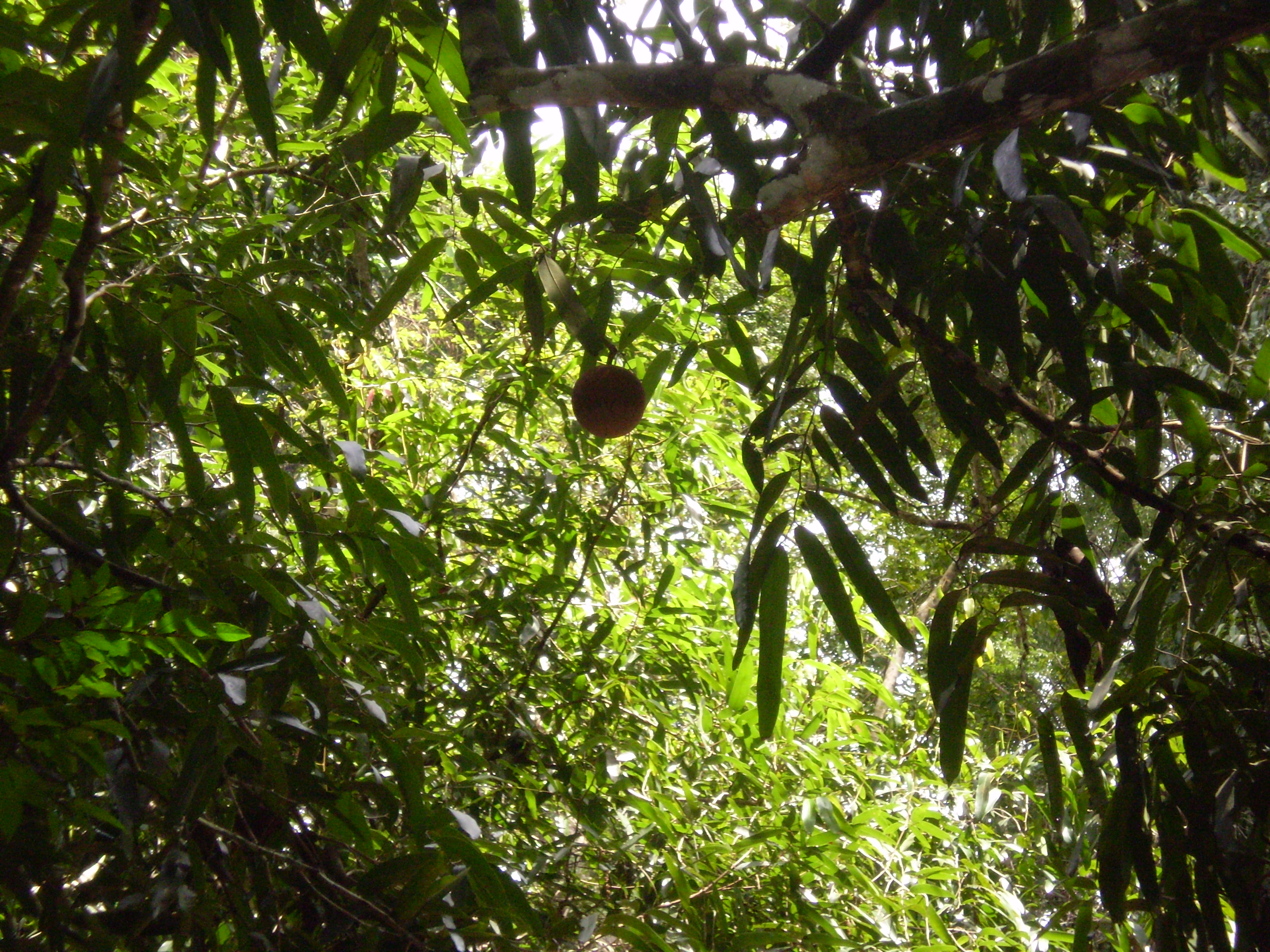

Conservation status
- Vulnerable (IUCN 2.3)

Scientific classification
- Kingdom: Plantae
- Clade: Tracheophytes
- Clade: Angiosperms
- Clade: Eudicots
- Clade: Rosids
- Order: Malpighiales
- Family: Achariaceae
- Genus: Hydnocarpus
- Species: H. annamensis

Binomial name
- Hydnocarpus annamensis (Gagnep.) Lescot & Sleumer, Fl. Cambodge, Laos & Vietnam 11: 10 (1970)

Synonyms
- Hydnocarpus kurzii var. conicus Craib; H. merrillianus H.L.Li; Taraktogenos annamensis Gagnep.; T. merrilliana C.Y.Wu

= Hydnocarpus annamensis =

Species of flowering plant

Hydnocarpus annamensis is a tree in the Achariaceae family. It is found in Thailand, Cambodia, Vietnam, southern Yunnan and southern Guangxi in China. It is threatened by habitat loss. The plant produces low-quality wood and its fruits are used in traditional medicine.

== Description ==
H. annamensis is an evergreen tree, some 7-30m tall, with gray-brown bark. Leaves are either obovate, elliptic-long or oblong-lanceolate, some 17–35 cm by 7–12 cm. The flowers are either solitary or in 2's or 3's, greenish, appearing April to May in China. The berry is reddish or brownish, seeds numerous, fruit appears December to January in China.

== Habitat ==
The species grows in secondary formations in Cambodia. In Vietnam, the tree is common and found in primary broad-leaved closed forest in seasonally flooded stream valleys and very steep rocky slopes of isolated limestone mountains at 400–500 elevation. It occurs on moist mountain slopes and thickets along streams in China.

== Conservation status ==
The habitat of the tree in China has suffered catastrophic damage because of clearance for agriculture and because of fruit harvesting, the plant has limited/scattered distribution, marking it as rare. Overall, H. annamensis and its lowland forest habitats are threatened by agriculture, including annual and perennial non-timber crops and livestock farming, ranching, by the gathering of terrestrial plants and by logging and wood harvesting.

== Populations ==
As noted above, the tree is found in Thailand, Cambodia, Vietnam, southern Yunnan and southern Guangxi in China. The species is relatively common in central and northern Vietnam. It occurs in the Phong Nha-Kẻ Bàng National Park, Quảng Bình Province, central Vietnam. It may have a presence in Laos. In China, the scattered populations are found in Mengla, Jiangchen, Jinping Miao, Yao, and Dai Autonomous County, Hekou Yao Autonomous County and Pingbian Miao Autonomous County in south Yunnan and Longzhou County in south-west Guangxi.

== Uses ==
The wood is regarded as 3rd class (low quality) in Cambodia, and is used to make charcoal and short-lasting constructions. In China, the fruit are harvested for their medicinal value.

== Common names ==
The tree is known by a number of names, including: krâbau (Khmer); nang trứng trung bộ, lọ nồi trung bộ, mạy ló, mắc la (Vietnamese); and 大叶龙角, da ye long jiao (Chinese)
