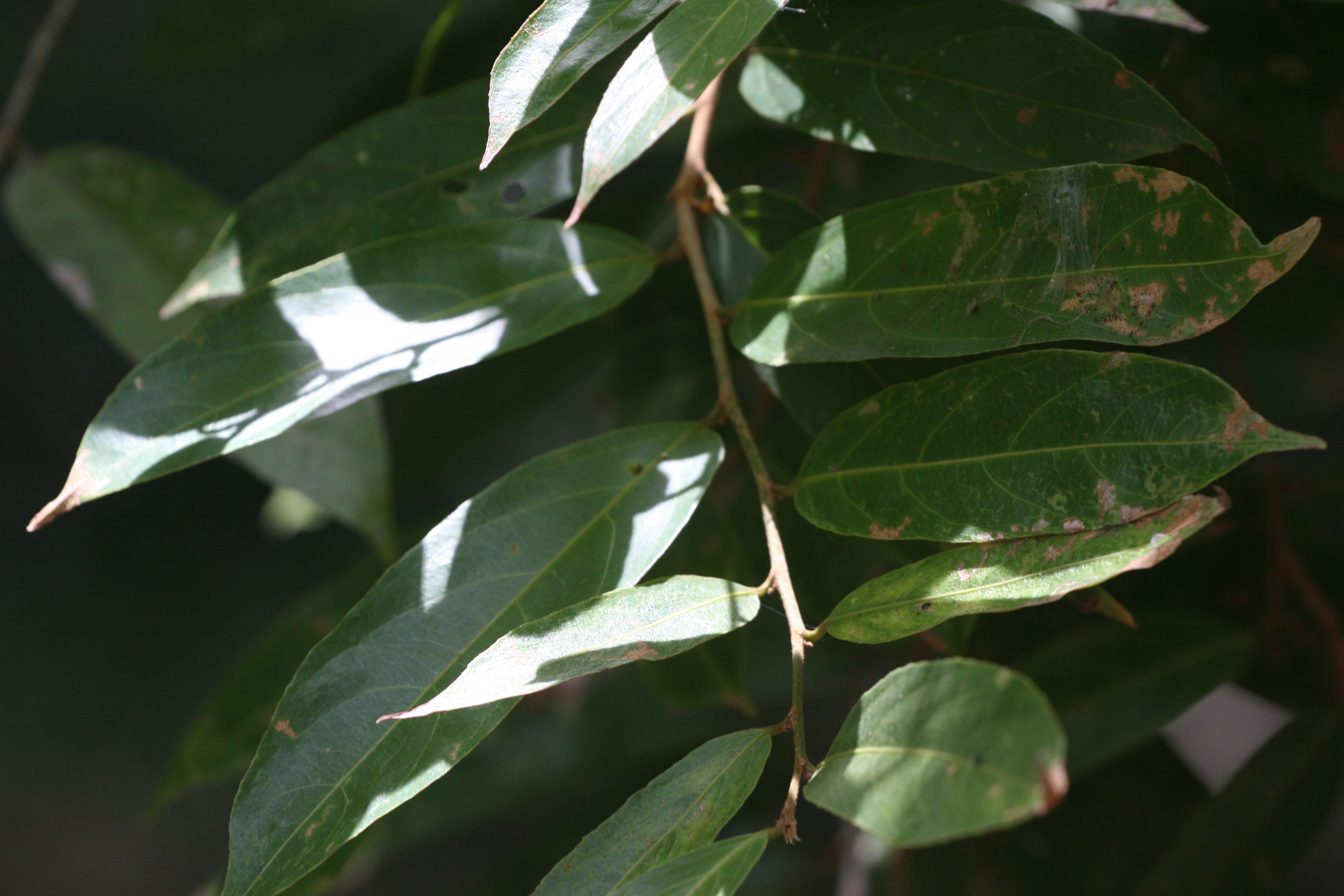

Scientific classification
- Kingdom: Plantae
- Clade: Tracheophytes
- Clade: Angiosperms
- Clade: Eudicots
- Clade: Rosids
- Order: Malpighiales
- Family: Achariaceae
- Genus: Hydnocarpus
- Species: H. venenata

Binomial name
- Hydnocarpus venenata Gaertn

Synonyms
- Hydnocarpus inebrians Vahl

= Hydnocarpus venenata =

Species of flowering plant

Hydnocarpus venenatus is a species of plant in the Achariaceae family. It is endemic to Sri Lanka. The oil the plants produce is known as Kavetel.
