= Hydnocarpus octandra =

Conservation status
- Vulnerable (IUCN 2.3)

Scientific classification
- Kingdom: Plantae
- Clade: Tracheophytes
- Clade: Angiosperms
- Clade: Eudicots
- Clade: Rosids
- Order: Malpighiales
- Family: Achariaceae
- Genus: Hydnocarpus
- Species: H. octandrus

Binomial name
- Hydnocarpus octandrus Thwaites

Synonyms
- Hydnocarpus octandra

Species of flowering plant

Hydnocarpus octandrus is a species of plant in the Achariaceae family, but originally placed in the Flacourtiaceae family by Arthur Cronquist. It is endemic to Sri Lanka.

== In culture ==
Known as "wal divul" in Sinhala
