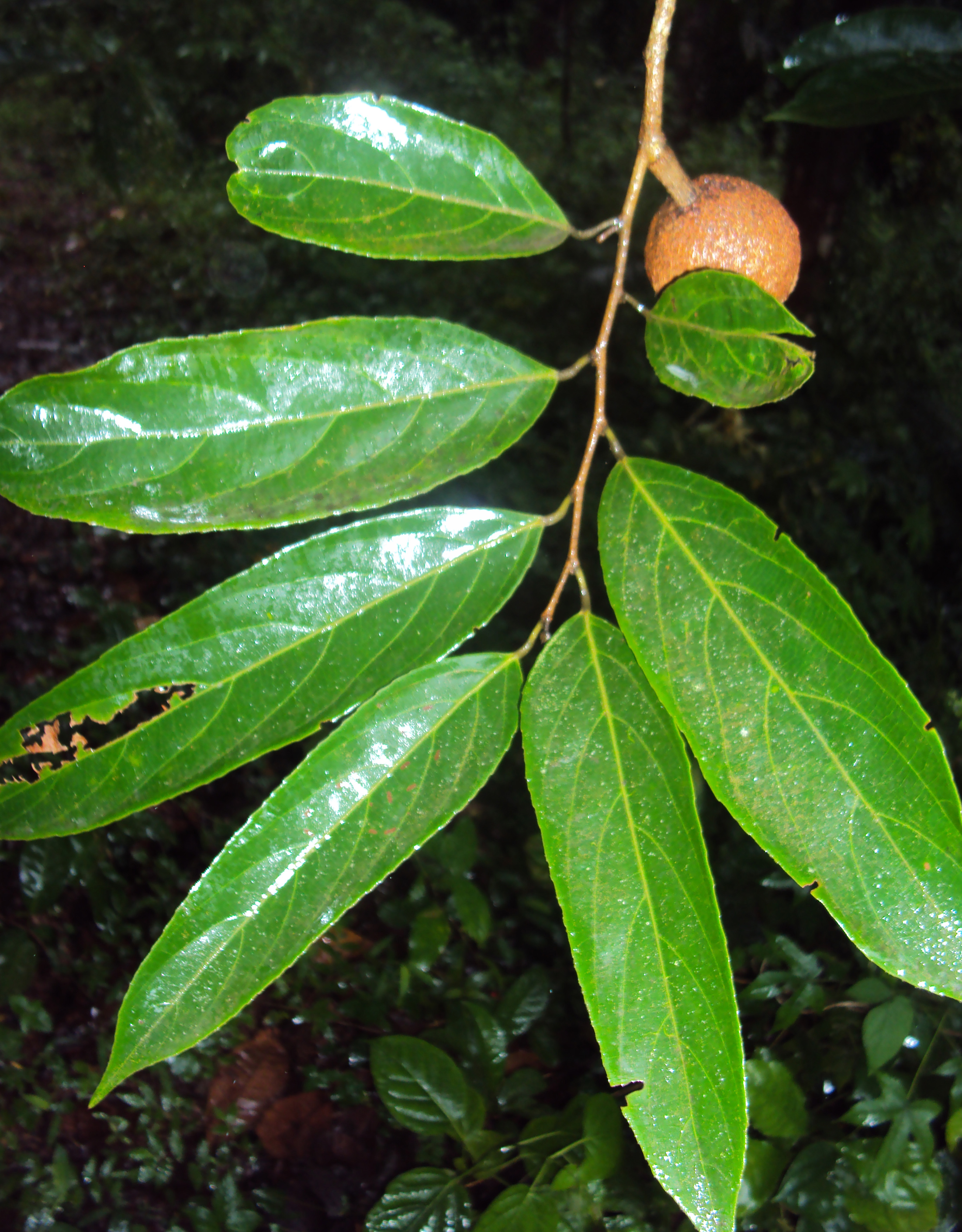

Scientific classification
- Kingdom: Plantae
- Clade: Tracheophytes
- Clade: Angiosperms
- Clade: Eudicots
- Clade: Rosids
- Order: Malpighiales
- Family: Achariaceae
- Genus: Hydnocarpus
- Species: H. alpinus

Binomial name
- Hydnocarpus alpinus Wight

Synonyms
- Hydnocarpus alpina

= Hydnocarpus alpina =

Species of flowering plant

Hydnocarpus alpinus is a species of plant in the Achariaceae family. It is found in China, Laos, and Vietnam. It is threatened by habitat loss.

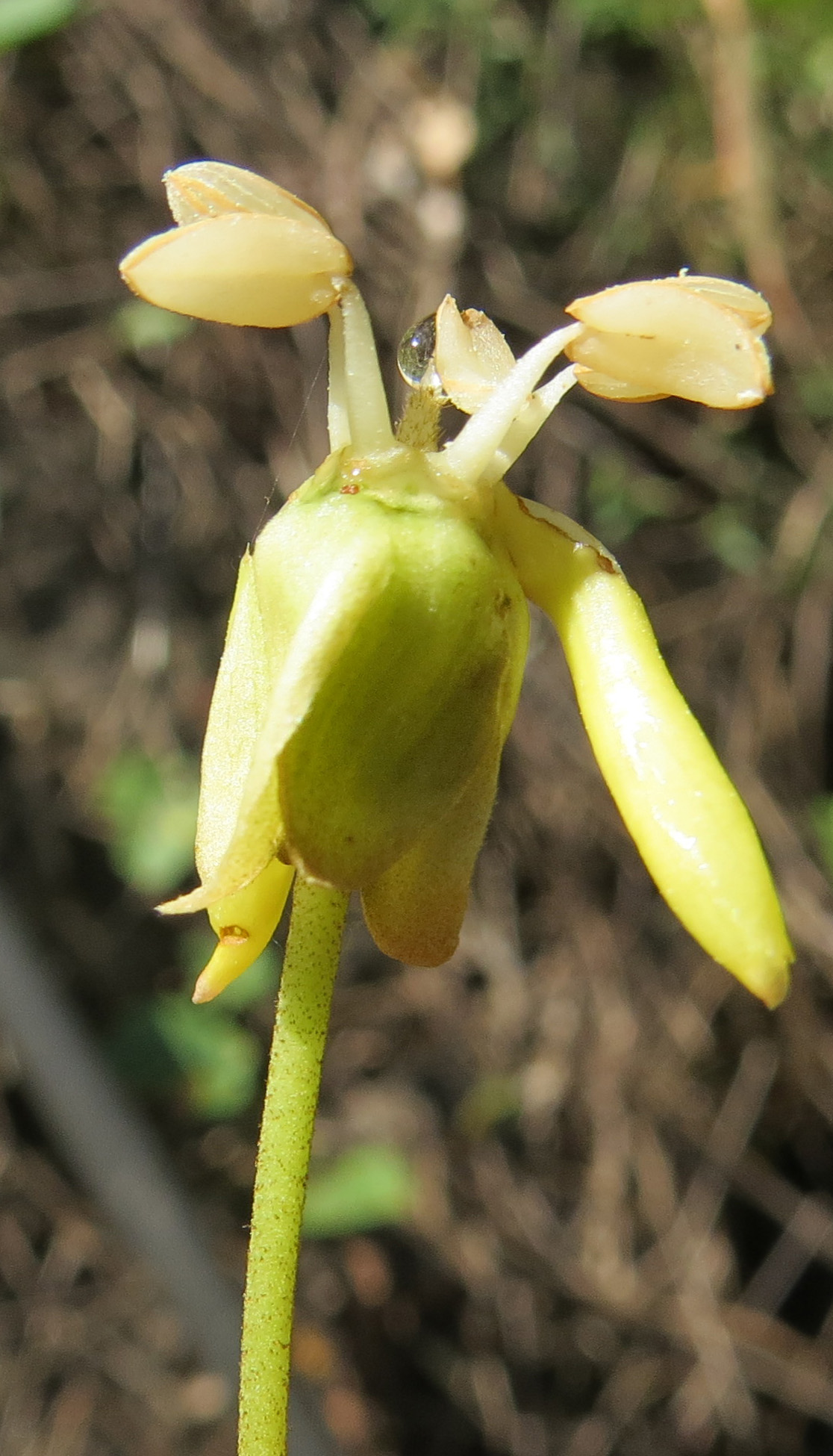
H. alpinus flower

== Varieties ==
Hydnocarpus alpinus may include:

- Hydnocarpus alpina var. elongata Boerl.
- Hydnocarpus alpina var. macrocarpa Boerl.
