= 5'-Methoxyhydnocarpin =

Names
- IUPAC name (5′′R,6′′R)-5,7-Dihydroxy-6′′-(4-hydroxy-3-methoxyphenyl)-5′′-(hydroxymethyl)-5′-methoxy-5′′,6′′-dihydro[1,4]dioxino[2′′,3′′:3′,4′]flavone
- Systematic IUPAC name 5,7-Dihydroxy-2-[(2R,3R)-3-(4-hydroxy-3-methoxyphenyl)-2-(hydroxymethyl)-8-methoxy-2,3-dihydro-1,4-benzodioxin-6-yl]-4H-1-benzopyran-4-one
- Other names 5′-MHC

Identifiers
CAS Number	54431-77-5
3D model (JSmol)	Interactive image
ChEBI	CHEBI:69451
ChEMBL	ChEMBL328060
ChemSpider	4445172
KEGG	C11162
PubChem CID	5281879
CompTox Dashboard (EPA)	DTXSID601045530
- InChI: InChI=1S/C26H22O10/c1-32-19-5-12(3-4-15(19)29)25-23(11-27)36-26-21(33-2)6-13(7-22(26)35-25)18-10-17(31)24-16(30)8-14(28)9-20(24)34-18/h3-10,23,25,27-30H,11H2,1-2H3/t23-,25-/m1/s1 Key: NIOAGUZTTGFPGK-ILBGXUMGSA-N; InChI=1/C26H22O10/c1-32-19-5-12(3-4-15(19)29)25-23(11-27)36-26-21(33-2)6-13(7-22(26)35-25)18-10-17(31)24-16(30)8-14(28)9-20(24)34-18/h3-10,23,25,27-30H,11H2,1-2H3/t23-,25-/m1/s1 Key: NIOAGUZTTGFPGK-ILBGXUMGBF
- SMILES: COC1=CC(=CC2=C1O[C@@H]([C@H](O2)C3=CC(=C(C=C3)O)OC)CO)C4=CC(=O)C5=C(C=C(C=C5O4)O)O

Properties
Chemical formula	C_{26}H_{22}O_{10}
Molar mass	494.452 g·mol^{−1}
- Except where otherwise noted, data are given for materials in their standard state (at 25 °C [77 °F], 100 kPa). Infobox references

5'-Methoxyhydnocarpin (5′-MHC) is a chemical compound that has been isolated from Berberis and Hydnocarpus wightianus.

5′-MHC potentiates the antimicrobial effect of berberine in vitro.
