= James Presley Ball =

American photographer (1825–1904)

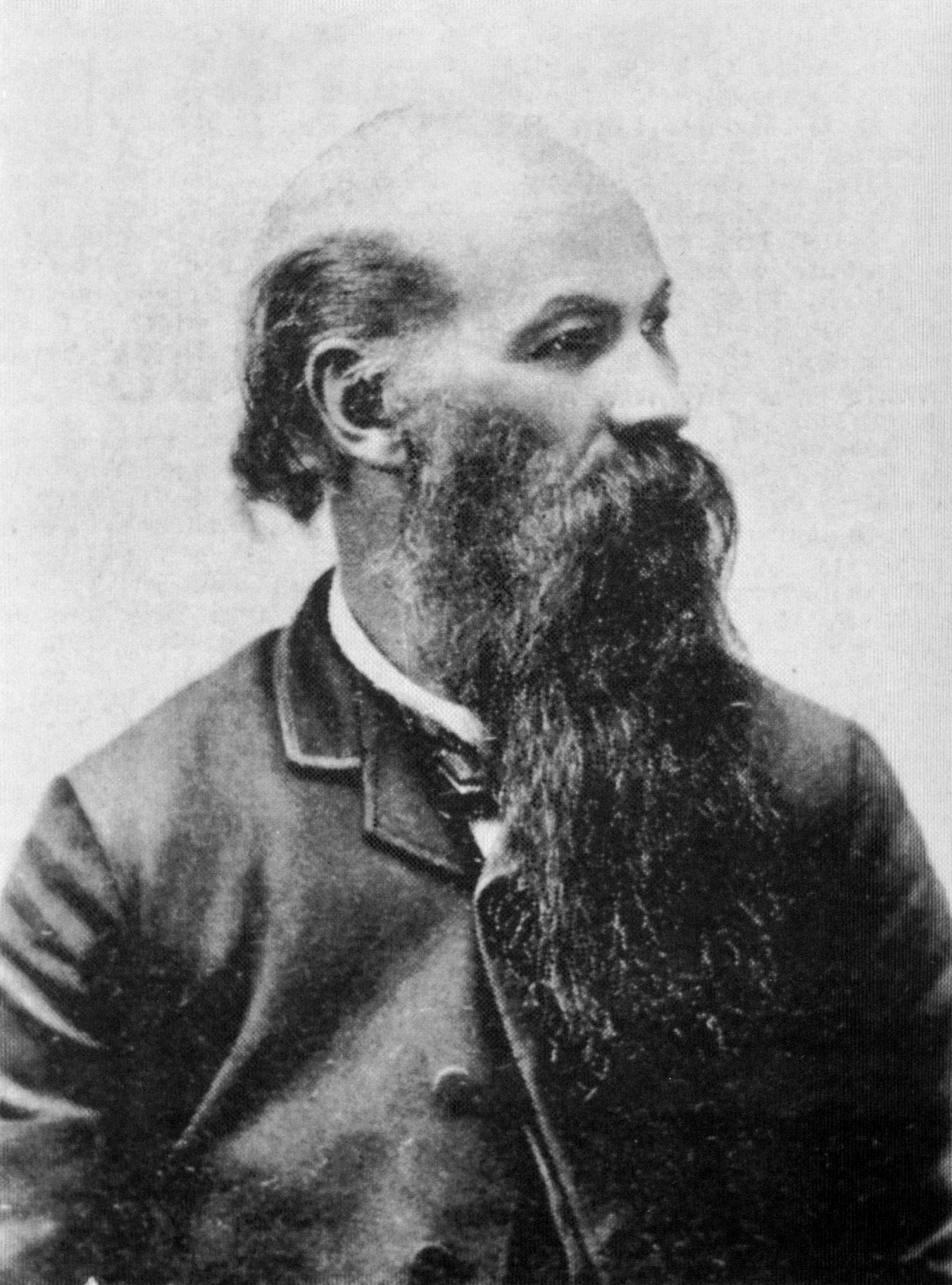
- Born: c. 1825; Frederick County, Virginia, U.S.
- Died: May 4, 1904; Honolulu, Oʻahu, Hawaii, U.S.
- Other name: J. P. Ball
- Occupations: Photographer, abolitionist, businessman, gallerist
- Relatives: Alice Ball (granddaughter)

James Presley Ball Sr. (c. 1825 – May 4, 1904) was an African-American photographer, abolitionist, and businessman.

== Biography ==
Ball was born in Frederick County, Virginia, to William and Susan Ball in 1825. He learned daguerreotype photography from John B. Bailey of Boston, who like Ball was "a freeman of color." Ball opened a one-room daguerreotype studio in Cincinnati, Ohio, in 1845. The business did not prosper, so Ball worked as an itinerant daguerreotypist, settling briefly in Pittsburgh, Pennsylvania, then in Richmond, Virginia in 1846 to develop a more successful studio near the State Capitol building.

In 1847, Ball again departed for Ohio, again as a traveling daguerreotypist. He settled in Cincinnati in 1849 and opened a studio where his brother Thomas Ball became an operator. The gallery, known as "Ball's Daguerrean Gallery of the West" or "Ball's Great Daguerrean Gallery of the West," ascended "from a small gallery to one of the great galleries of the Midwest." Starting in 1854 and continuing "for about four years," Robert Seldon Duncanson worked in Ball's studio retouching portraits and coloring photographic prints. Gleason's Pictorial Drawing-Room Companion in 1854 described the gallery as displaying 187 photographs by Ball and 6 paintings by Duncanson; furthermore, the gallery was "replete with elegance and beauty," with walls "bordered with gold leaf and flowers," "master-piece" furniture, a piano, and mirrors.

Meanwhile, Ball opened the separate Ball and Thomas Gallery with his brother-in-law Alexander Thomas. In 1855, Ball published an abolitionist pamphlet accompanied by a 600-yard-long panoramic painting entitled "Mammoth Pictorial Tour of the United States Comprising Views of the African Slave Trade"; Duncanson probably participated in the production of the painting. During 1855 Ball's daguerreotypes were shown at the Ohio State Fair and at the Ohio Mechanics Annual Exhibition. In 1856 Ball traveled to Europe. The Ball and Thomas Gallery was destroyed by a tornado in May 1860, but was later rebuilt with assistance from the community.

During the 1870s Ball ended his partnership with Thomas and moved to Greenville, Mississippi; Vidalia, Louisiana; St. Louis, Missouri; and then Minneapolis, Minnesota, where he started a new studio. By 1887, the studio was known as "J. P. Ball & Son, Artistic Photographers"; Ball's son was named James Presley Ball, Jr. In September 1887, Ball became the official photographer of the 25th anniversary celebration of the Emancipation Proclamation.

In October 1887, Ball again moved, this time to Helena, Montana, where the "J. P. Ball & Son" studio was established. By 1894, Ball had become active in politics in Helena; for example, he was nominated for a county coroner position which he declined. One of the notable series of photographs Ball took his stay in Helena involved William Biggerstaff (an African-American man) before, during, and after he was hanged in 1896 for committing murder.

By 1892, the Ball family moved to Seattle, Washington, where Ball opened the Globe Photo Studio. He may have relocated to Portland, Oregon, in 1901. The family moved to Honolulu in 1902, where Ball died in 1904.

== Works ==
=== Book ===
- Ball, James Presley. Ball's splendid mammoth pictorial tour of the United States. Comprising views of the African slave trade; of Northern and Southern cities; of cotton and sugar plantations; of the Mississippi, Ohio and Susquehanna Rivers, Niagara Falls, &C. Compiled for the panorama. Cincinnati: Achilles Pugh, 1855. (see link below)

=== Photographs ===
Among the subjects of Ball's photographic portraits were P.T. Barnum, Charles Dickens, Henry Highland Garnet, the family of Ulysses S. Grant, Jenny Lind, and Queen Victoria. The techniques used for "all the known photographs of J. P. Ball" as of 1993 included mostly daguerreotypes and albumen prints (e.g., as carte de visites). In 1992, Swann Galleries sold an 1851 daguerreotype by Ball of three storefronts in Cincinnati for $63,800, which set a world record at the time for highest price paid for a daguerreotype at auction.

Ball's photographic work is held by, among other institutions: Schomburg Center for Research in Black Culture, Cincinnati Art Museum, Cincinnati Historical Society, George Eastman House, Library of Congress, Montana Historical Society, Ohio State University, and University of Washington.

== See also ==
- List of African-American abolitionists
- Alice Ball, granddaughter
