= Hydnocarpus humei =

Conservation status
- Vulnerable (IUCN 2.3)

Scientific classification
- Kingdom: Plantae
- Clade: Tracheophytes
- Clade: Angiosperms
- Clade: Eudicots
- Clade: Rosids
- Order: Malpighiales
- Family: Achariaceae
- Genus: Hydnocarpus
- Species: H. humei

Binomial name
- Hydnocarpus humei Ridley

Species of tree

Hydnocarpus humei is a species of plant in the family Achariaceae. It is a tree endemic to Peninsular Malaysia. It is threatened by habitat loss.
