= Hydnocarpus nana =

Conservation status
- Near Threatened (IUCN 2.3)

Scientific classification
- Kingdom: Plantae
- Clade: Tracheophytes
- Clade: Angiosperms
- Clade: Eudicots
- Clade: Rosids
- Order: Malpighiales
- Family: Achariaceae
- Genus: Hydnocarpus
- Species: H. nanus

Binomial name
- Hydnocarpus nanus King

Synonyms
- Hydnocarpus nanus var. pubescens King

Species of tree

Hydnocarpus nanus is a species of flowering plant in the family Achariaceae. It is a tree endemic to Peninsular Malaysia. It is threatened by habitat loss.
