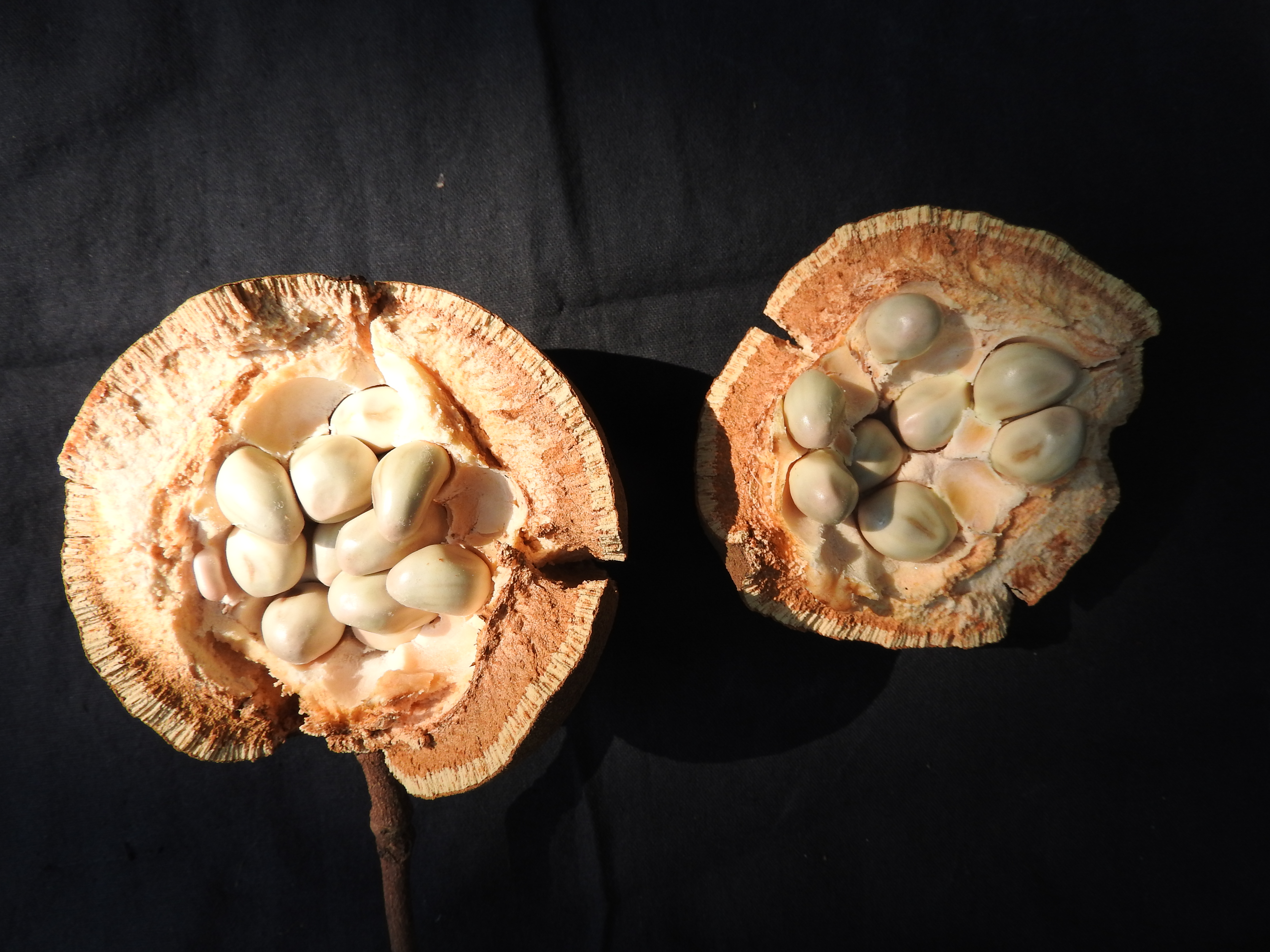

Conservation status
- Vulnerable (IUCN 3.1)

Scientific classification
- Kingdom: Plantae
- Clade: Tracheophytes
- Clade: Angiosperms
- Clade: Eudicots
- Clade: Rosids
- Order: Malpighiales
- Family: Achariaceae
- Genus: Hydnocarpus
- Species: H. macrocarpus

Binomial name
- Hydnocarpus macrocarpus (Bedd.) Warb.

Synonyms
- Asteriastigma macrocarpum Bedd.; Taraktogenos macrocarpa (Bedd.) N.P.Balakr.

= Hydnocarpus macrocarpus =

Species of tree

Hydnocarpus macrocarpus is a species of flowering plant.

== Description ==
Large evergreen tree with greyish brown bark and cream blaze. Leaves are simple, alternate, spiral, and clustered at twig ends.

== Distribution ==
The native range of this species is SW. India and Indo-China.

== Uses ==
Leaf extracts of Hydnocarpus macrocarpa have demonstrated significant pharmacological and antibacterial properties
