= Hydnocarpus saigonensis =

Scientific classification
- Kingdom: Plantae
- Clade: Tracheophytes
- Clade: Angiosperms
- Clade: Eudicots
- Clade: Rosids
- Order: Malpighiales
- Family: Achariaceae
- Genus: Hydnocarpus
- Species: H. saigonensis

Binomial name
- Hydnocarpus saigonensis Pierre ex Gagnep., Bull. Soc. Bot. France 55: 523 (1908)

Species of flowering plant

Hydnocarpus saigonensis is a tree in the Achariaceae family. It is endemic to the Mekong basin of Cambodia and southern Vietnam (Tây Ninh Province and the former Phước Tuy Province).

It grows some 7-10m tall, and is found in relatively small and fragmented populations within secondary forest formations, and the flooded forests of Tonle Sap and the Mekong.

The wood is used to make charcoal, occasionally for temporary constructions. It is known as krâbau nhi, krâbau sva: and krâbau phlè tauch (="small fruit-krabau") in Khmer.
