= Hydnocarpus castaneus =

Scientific classification
- Kingdom: Plantae
- Clade: Tracheophytes
- Clade: Angiosperms
- Clade: Eudicots
- Clade: Rosids
- Order: Malpighiales
- Family: Achariaceae
- Genus: Hydnocarpus
- Species: H. castaneus

Binomial name
- Hydnocarpus castaneus Hook. f. & Thoms.

Synonyms
- Hydnocarpus anthelminthicus Pierre ex Laness.; Hydnocarpus castanea Hook.f. & Thomson; Hydnocarpus castaneus subsp. pseudoverrucosus Sleumer

Species of flowering plant

Hydnocarpus castaneus is an Asian tree species in the family Achariaceae. It is now accepted that Hydnocarpus anthelminthicus is a synonym and its native range is from Burma, the rest of Indochina through to W. Malesia; this species is now also cultivated in southern China.

== Description ==
This tree species grows to between 10 and 20 m with coriaceous, glabrous leaves 150–300 mm long. The spherical fruits are velvety and brown-black, with a diameter of 70–150 mm and containing 30–50 fleshy 15-20mm seeds.

== Traditional medicine ==
Also widely known under its name H. anthelminthicus, suggesting anthelmintic properties, the Vietnamese is lọ nồi (sometimes Ðại phong tử). It is one of the 50 fundamental herbs used in traditional Chinese medicine, where it may be called dà fēng zǐ 大风子 or 泰国大风子 tai guo da feng zi.
