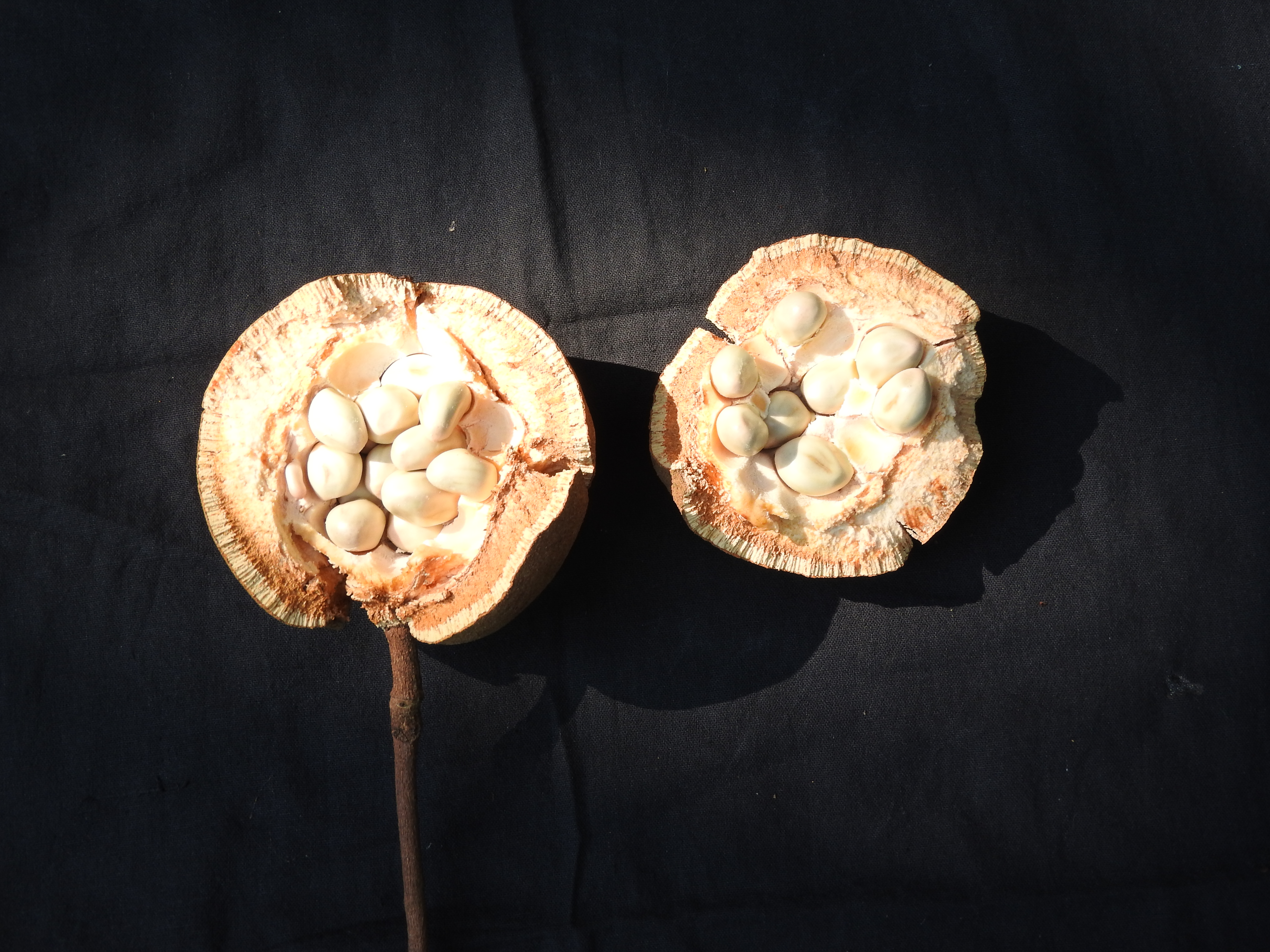
- Hydnocarpus macrocarpus fruit

Scientific classification
- Kingdom: Plantae
- Clade: Tracheophytes
- Clade: Angiosperms
- Clade: Eudicots
- Clade: Rosids
- Order: Malpighiales
- Family: Achariaceae
- Genus: Hydnocarpus; Gaertn.

Species
- See text

Synonyms
- Asteriastigma Bedd.; Dankia Gagnep.; Taraktogenos Hassk.

= Hydnocarpus =

Genus of flowering plants

Hydnocarpus is a genus of medium to large trees in the family Achariaceae; the genus was previously placed in the now defunct family Flacourtiaceae. Species have been recorded from Indochina, Indonesia, Malaysia and the Philippines.

== Characteristics ==
Hydnocarpus has alternate leaves, small dioecious racemose flowers, and capsules of which several are sources of chaulmoogra oil and hydnocarpus oil. A species of Hydnocarpus is thought to host to the Peacock mite Tuckerella filipina.

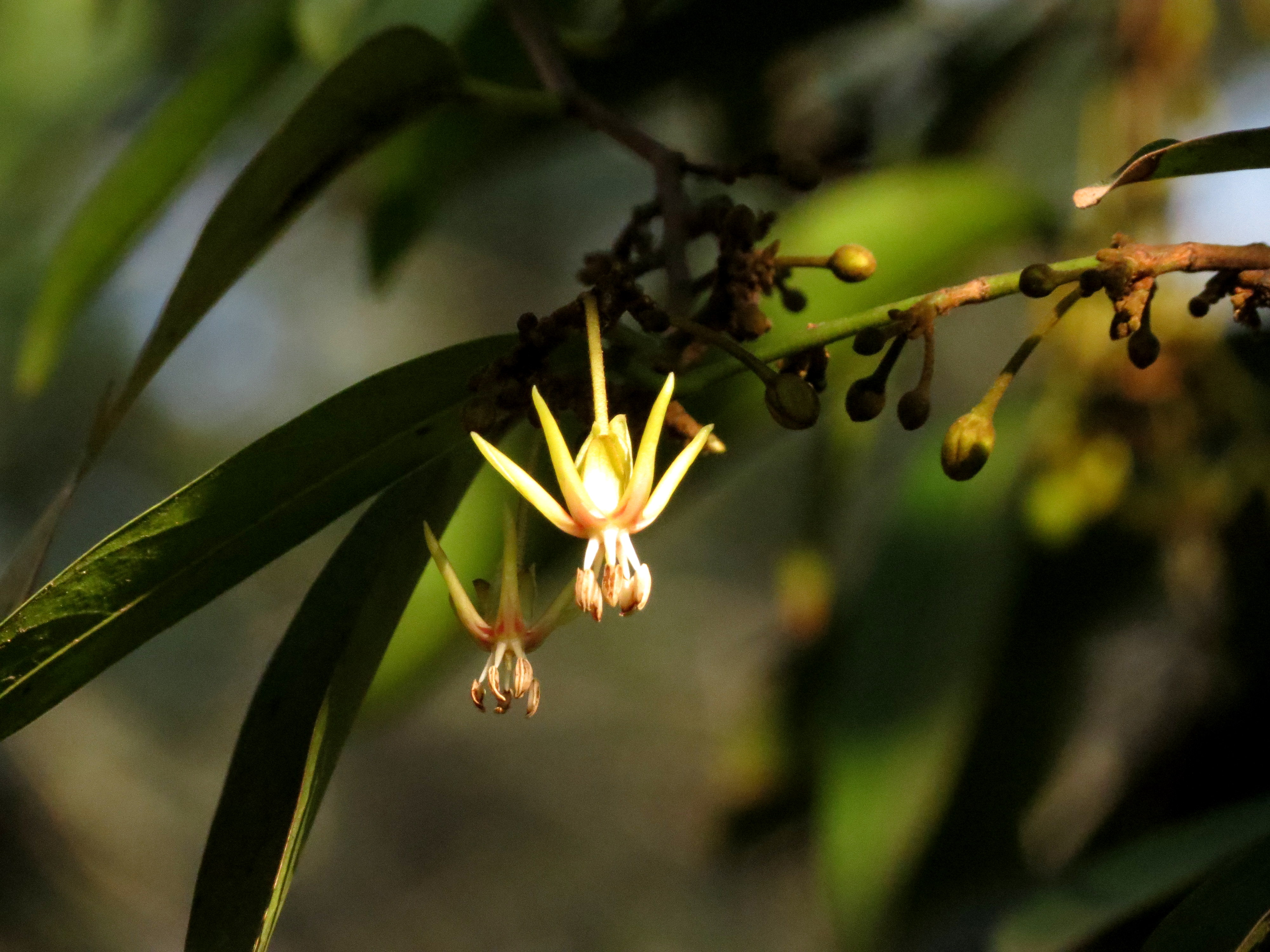
Hydnocarpus alpinus flower

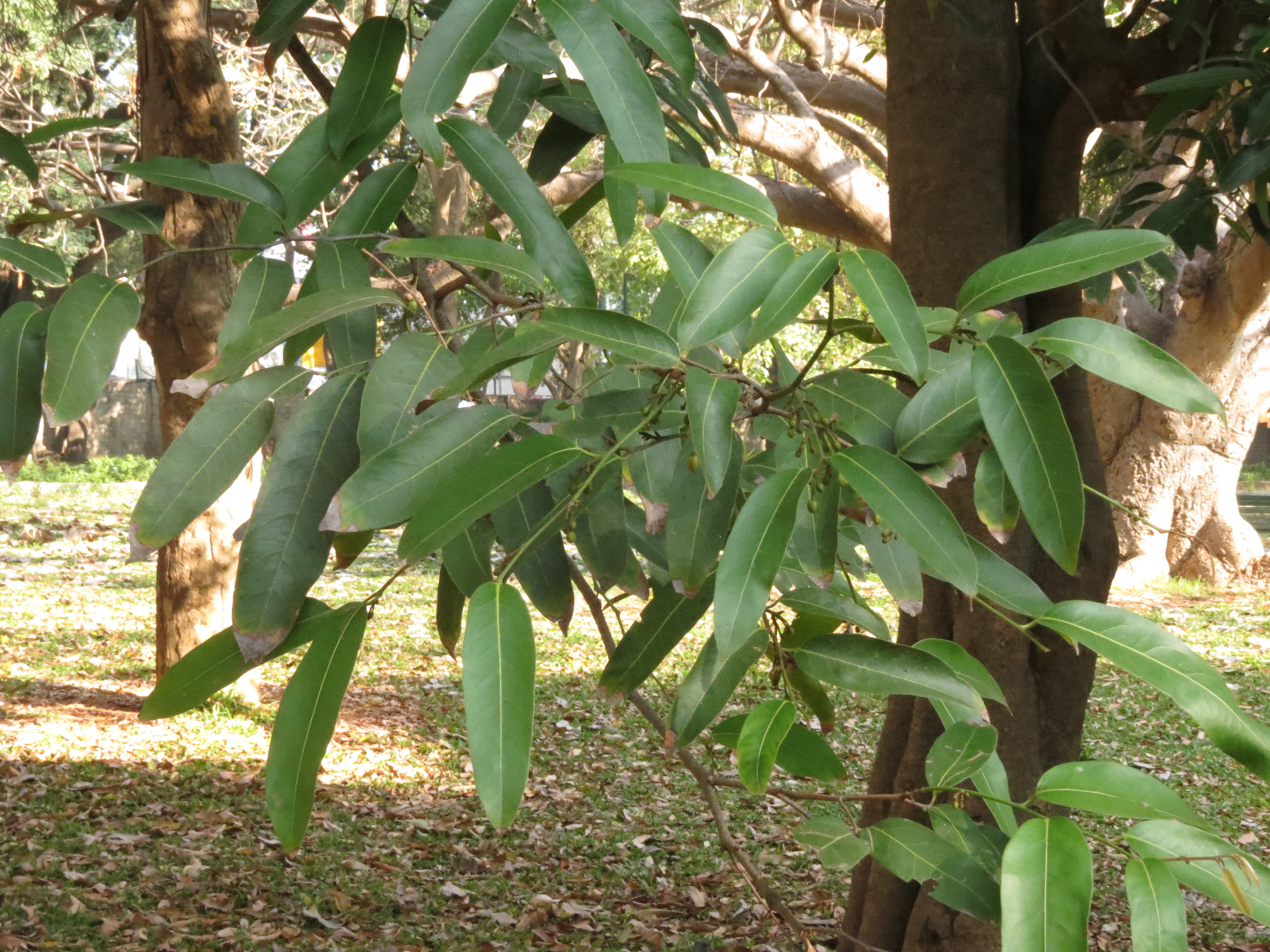
Hydnocarpus alpinus leaves

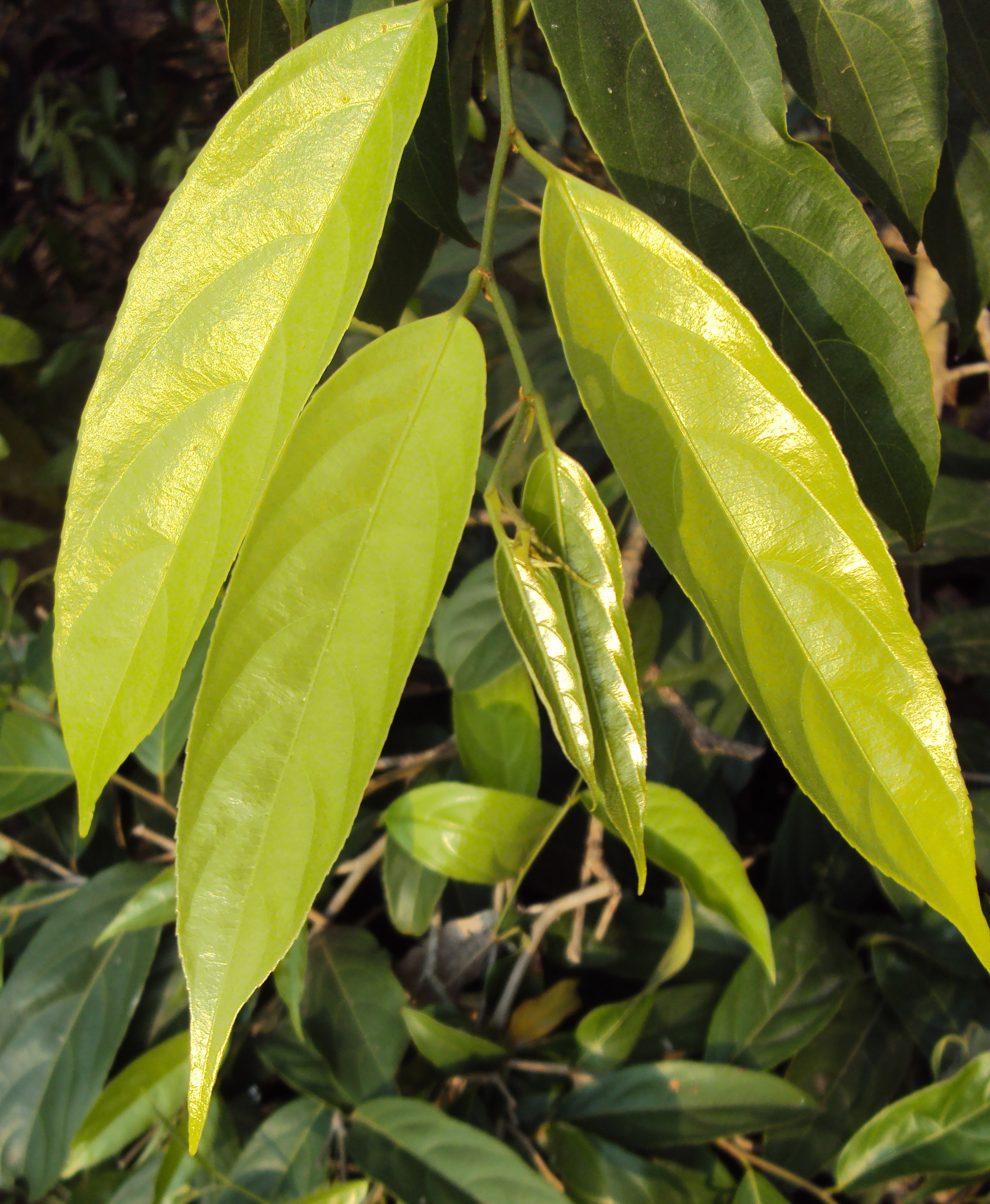
Hydnocarpus pentandra leaves

== Species ==
Plants of the World Online currently includes:

- Hydnocarpus alcalae C.DC.
- Hydnocarpus alpinus Wight (H.alpina)
- Hydnocarpus annamensis Lescot & Sleumer ex Harwood & B.L.Webber
- Hydnocarpus annamicus H.L.Li
- Hydnocarpus anomalus (Merr.) Sleumer
- Hydnocarpus anthelminithicus (Merr.) Sleumer
- Hydnocarpus beccarianus Sleumer
- Hydnocarpus borneensis Sleumer
- Hydnocarpus calophyllus (Ridl.) Sleumer
- Hydnocarpus calvipetalus Craib
- Hydnocarpus castaneus Hook.f. & Thomson
  - synonym: (sic) Pierre ex Laness.
- Hydnocarpus cauliflorus Merr.
- Hydnocarpus corymbosus Seem.
- Hydnocarpus crassifolius Sleumer
- Hydnocarpus cucurbitinus King (H. cucurbitana)
- Hydnocarpus curtisii King
- Hydnocarpus dawnensis C.E.Parkinson & C.E.C.Fisch.
- Hydnocarpus elmeri Merr.
- Hydnocarpus filipes Symington & Sleumer
- Hydnocarpus glaucescens Blume
- Hydnocarpus gracilis (Slooten) Sleumer
- Hydnocarpus hainanensis (Merr.) Sleumer
- Hydnocarpus heterophyllus Blume
- Hydnocarpus humei Ridl.
- Hydnocarpus ilicifolius King
- Hydnocarpus kunstleri (King) Warb.
- Hydnocarpus kurzii (King) Warb. (= H. heterophyllus)
- Hydnocarpus longipedunculatus Robi, Sasidh. & Jose
- Hydnocarpus macrocarpus (Bedd.) Warb.
- Hydnocarpus merrillianus Sleumer
- Hydnocarpus nanus King (H. nana)
- Hydnocarpus octandrus Thwaites (H. octandra)
- Hydnocarpus pendulus Manilal, T.Sabu & Sivar.
- Hydnocarpus pentandrus (Buch.-Ham.) Oken
  - synonym: Hydnocarpus wightianus Blume
- Hydnocarpus pinguis Sleumer
- Hydnocarpus polypetalus (Slooten) Sleumer
- Hydnocarpus saigonensis Pierre ex Gagnep.
- Hydnocarpus scortechinii King
- Hydnocarpus subfalcatus Merr.
- Hydnocarpus sumatranus (Miq.) Koord. (= H. hutchinsonii)
- Hydnocarpus tenuipetalus Sleumer
- Hydnocarpus venenatus Gaertn. (H. venetana) - type species
- Hydnocarpus verrucosus C.E.Parkinson & C.E.C.Fisch.
- Hydnocarpus woodii Merr.
- Hydnocarpus wrayi King
- Hydnocarpus yatesii Merr.

Note: A number of species were formerly in Taraktogenos.
