= Tuberculostearic acid =

19-Carbon branched fatty acid

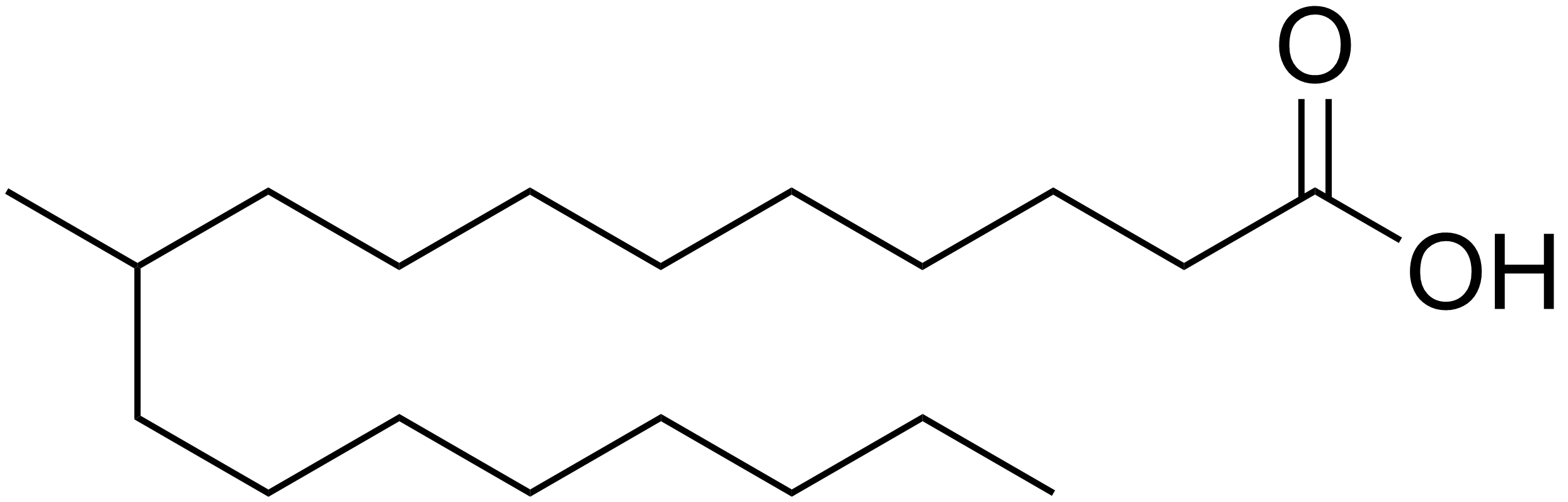

Names
- Preferred IUPAC name 10-Methyloctadecanoic acid
- Other names 10-Methylstearic acid

Identifiers
CAS Number	542-47-2
3D model (JSmol)	Interactive image
ChEBI	CHEBI:68565
ChemSpider	58549
PubChem CID	65037
UNII	C2LR962W58
CompTox Dashboard (EPA)	DTXSID50862155
- InChI: InChI=1S/C19H38O2/c1-3-4-5-6-9-12-15-18(2)16-13-10-7-8-11-14-17-19(20)21/h18H,3-17H2,1-2H3,(H,20,21) Key: BEOUGZFCUMNGOU-UHFFFAOYSA-N; InChI=1/C19H38O2/c1-3-4-5-6-9-12-15-18(2)16-13-10-7-8-11-14-17-19(20)21/h18H,3-17H2,1-2H3,(H,20,21) Key: BEOUGZFCUMNGOU-UHFFFAOYAL
- SMILES: O=C(O)CCCCCCCCC(C)CCCCCCCC

Properties
Chemical formula	C_{19}H_{38}O_{2}
Molar mass	298.50 g/mol
- Except where otherwise noted, data are given for materials in their standard state (at 25 °C [77 °F], 100 kPa). verify (what is ?) Infobox references

Tuberculostearic acid is a saturated fatty acid produced by Actinomycetales bacteria. The name 'Tuberculostearic acid' was coined because it was first isolated in 1927 from the bacteria Mycobacterium tuberculosis.

== See also ==
- Thiocarlide
