= Hydnocarpic acid =

Names
- Preferred IUPAC name 11-(Cyclopent-2-en-1-yl)undecanoic acid

Identifiers
CAS Number	94300-40-0; 1R: 459-67-6
3D model (JSmol)	Interactive image; 1R: Interactive image
ChemSpider	99343; 1R: 144298
PubChem CID	110680; 1R: 164601
UNII	U88T2W388K; 1R: 84492ZS09R
- InChI: InChI=1S/C16H28O2/c17-16(18)14-8-6-4-2-1-3-5-7-11-15-12-9-10-13-15/h9,12,15H,1-8,10-11,13-14H2,(H,17,18) Key: SRELFLQJDOTNLJ-UHFFFAOYSA-N; InChI=1/C16H28O2/c17-16(18)14-8-6-4-2-1-3-5-7-11-15-12-9-10-13-15/h9,12,15H,1-8,10-11,13-14H2,(H,17,18) Key: SRELFLQJDOTNLJ-UHFFFAOYAT; 1R: InChI=1S/C16H28O2/c17-16(18)14-8-6-4-2-1-3-5-7-11-15-12-9-10-13-15/h9,12,15H,1-8,10-11,13-14H2,(H,17,18)/t15-/m0/s1
- SMILES: O=C(O)CCCCCCCCCCC1\C=C/CC1; 1R: C1C[C@H](C=C1)CCCCCCCCCCC(=O)O

Properties
Chemical formula	C_{16}H_{28}O_{2}
Molar mass	252.398 g·mol^{−1}
- Except where otherwise noted, data are given for materials in their standard state (at 25 °C [77 °F], 100 kPa). Infobox references

Hydnocarpic acid is an unsaturated fatty acid. It differs from most fatty acids by having a cyclic ring system at the terminus, rather than being entirely straight chain. It is found in the oil from plants of the genus Hydnocarpus from which it derives its name.

== See also ==
- Chaulmoogric acid
- Gorlic acid
