= Chaulmoogric acid =

Names
- IUPAC name 13-[(1S)-Cyclopent-2-en-1-yl]tridecanoic acid

Identifiers
CAS Number	29106-32-9
3D model (JSmol)	Interactive image
ChEBI	CHEBI:61391
ChEMBL	ChEMBL2204421
ChemSpider	390179.html : 390179
ECHA InfoCard	100.044.931
EC Number	249-440-7
KEGG	C08282
PubChem CID	441446
UNII	6TD35V6OLU
CompTox Dashboard (EPA)	DTXSID00872002
- InChI: InChI=1S/C18H32O2/c19-18(20)16-10-8-6-4-2-1-3-5-7-9-13-17-14-11-12-15-17/h11,14,17H,1-10,12-13,15-16H2,(H,19,20)/t17-/m1/s1 Key: XMVQWNRDPAAMJB-QGZVFWFLSA-N
- SMILES: C(CCCCCCCCCCCC(O)=O)[C@H]1CCC=C1

Properties
Chemical formula	C_{18}H_{32}O_{2}
Molar mass	280.452 g·mol^{−1}
Melting point	68.5 °C (155.3 °F; 341.6 K)
- Except where otherwise noted, data are given for materials in their standard state (at 25 °C [77 °F], 100 kPa). Infobox references

Chaulmoogric acid is a fatty acid found in chaulmoogra oil, the oil from the seeds of Hydnocarpus wightianus. It is an unusual fatty acid which has a cyclopentene ring at its terminus instead of being entirely linear like most fatty acids.

It is a white crystalline solid with a melting point of 68.5 °C. It is soluble in ether, chloroform, and ethyl acetate.

In the early 20th century, it was investigated as a possible treatment for leprosy due to the use in traditional medicine of chaulmoogra oil for leprosy.

== See also ==
- Gorlic acid
- Hydnocarpic acid
