= Bornean mystery monkey =

Possible Bornean monkey hybrid

Scientific classification
- Kingdom: Animalia
- Phylum: Chordata
- Class: Mammalia
- Order: Primates
- Family: Cercopithecidae
- Subfamily: Colobinae
- Tribe: Presbytini
- Hybrid: Nasalis larvatus × Trachypithecus cristatus

Unidentified primate in East Malaysia

The Bornean mystery monkey is an unidentified primate in East Malaysia. It is suspected that it may be an intergeneric hybrid between the proboscis monkey (Nasalis larvatus) and silvery lutung (Trachypithecus cristatus), although genetic testing has not yet been conducted to prove this. It was first observed in 2016. In September 2020, the female was seen with a baby.

The morphometric analysis of the individual from photographs proposed that the individual's existence is the result of the rapidly shrinking habitat. However, the director of the Sabah Wildlife Department cautioned that this conclusion about the ecosystem was a speculation requiring more thorough research.
