= Microcolobus =

Microcolobus Temporal range: Late Miocene 10.5–8.5 Ma

Scientific classification
- Kingdom: Animalia
- Phylum: Chordata
- Class: Mammalia
- Order: Primates
- Family: Cercopithecidae
- Subfamily: Colobinae
- Genus: †Microcolobus; Benefit & Pickford, 1986
- Species: †M. tugenensis

Binomial name
- †Microcolobus tugenensis Benefit & Pickford, 1986

Extinct genus of Old World monkeys

Microcolobus is an extinct genus of Old World monkey that lived in eastern Africa during the Late Miocene and is regarded as the first known member of the Colobinae.

== Taxonomy ==
Microcolobus was described in 1986 from remains that were found in the Tugen Hills in Kenya and have been dated to between 10.5 and 8.5 million years ago. Fossils of this species (or a close relative) have also been found in Nakali. Primitive characteristics shared with the extinct Mesopithecus of Asia suggest a close phyletic relationship between the two.

== Description ==
Microcolobus was a small species of monkey, estimated at only 4–5 kg (8.8–11.0 lb) in weight. It had more primitive characteristics than modern colobines such as having lower molar cusps and more crushing surfaces on the premolars. Its small size and less developed shearing crests suggest that it would have been less folivorous than modern colobines. While postracinal elements indicate it was likely arboreal, it does not have the reduced thumb seen in living relatives.
