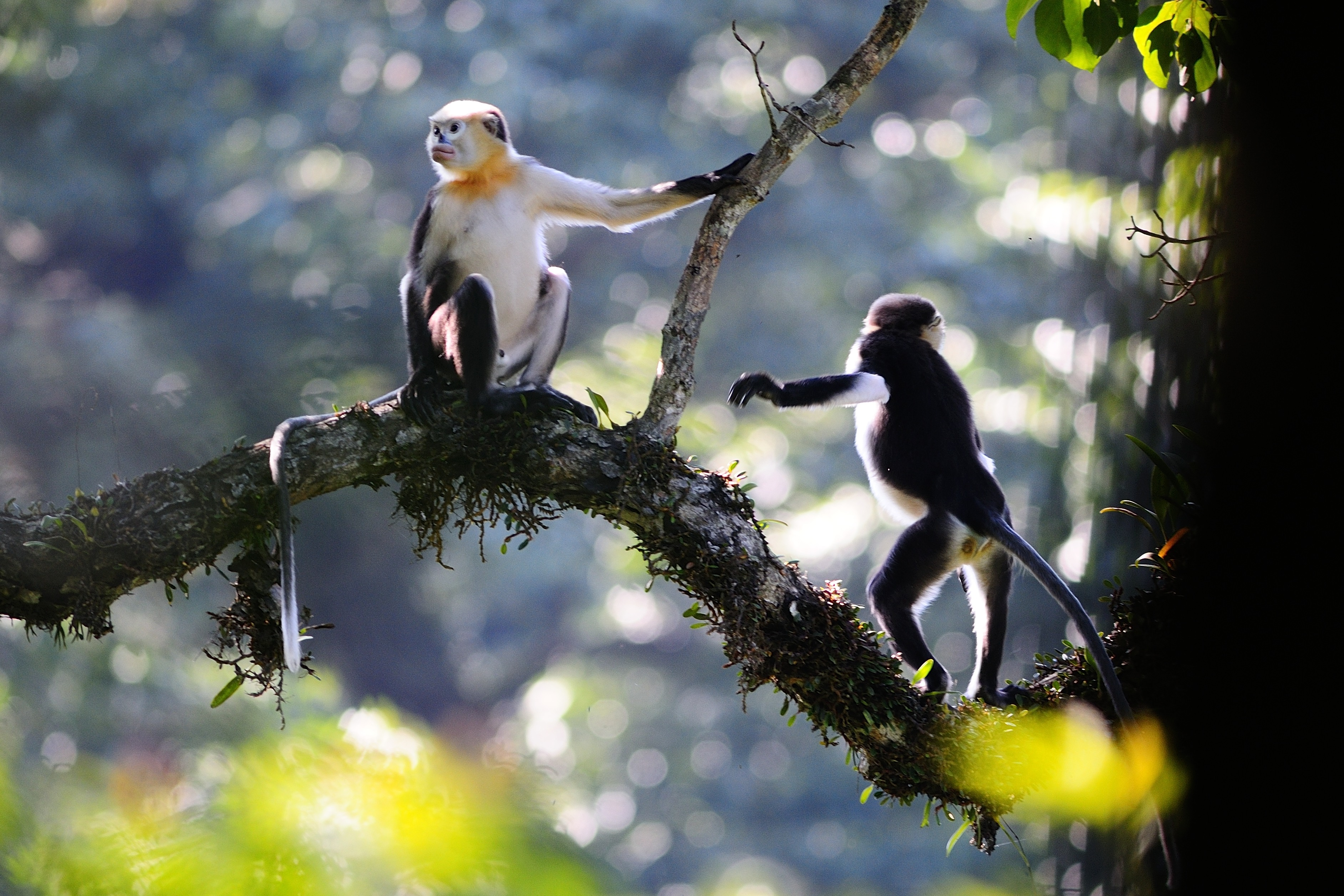

Conservation status
- Critically Endangered (IUCN 3.1)
- CITES Appendix I

Scientific classification
- Kingdom: Animalia
- Phylum: Chordata
- Class: Mammalia
- Infraclass: Placentalia
- Order: Primates
- Family: Cercopithecidae
- Genus: Rhinopithecus
- Species: R. avunculus

Binomial name
- Rhinopithecus avunculus (Dollman, 1912)
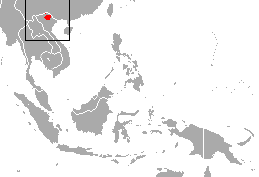
- Tonkin snub-nosed langur range

= Tonkin snub-nosed monkey =

Species of Old World monkey

The Tonkin snub-nosed monkey or Dollman's snub-nosed monkey (Rhinopithecus avunculus) is a slender-bodied arboreal Old World monkey endemic to northern Vietnam. It has black and white fur, a pink nose and lips, and blue patches around the eyes. It is found at elevations from 200 to 1,200 m (700 to 3,900 ft) on fragmentary patches of forest on craggy limestone areas. First described in 1912, the monkey was rediscovered in 1989 but is exceedingly rare. Out of the five snub-nosed monkey species in the world, the Tonkin snub-nosed monkey is the rarest. In 2008, fewer than 250 individuals were thought to exist, and the species was the subject of intense conservation effort. The main threats faced by these monkeys are habitat loss and hunting, and the International Union for Conservation of Nature has rated the species as "critically endangered".

== Description ==
The Tonkin snub-nosed monkey has a flattened face with a pink upturned nose, thickened pink lips and areas of blue skin around its eyes. The upper parts are black, the underparts creamy-white, and there is an orange patch on the throat which is particularly obvious in breeding males. The tail has a white tip. Its head-and-body length is 51 to 65 cm (20 to 26 in) and its tail 66 to 92 cm (26 to 36 in). Females weigh about 8 kg (18 lb) while males weigh 14 kg (31 lb). Juveniles are grey rather than black, and lack the orange throat patch. Compared to the other four species of snub-nosed monkeys, the Tonkin snub-nosed monkey exhibits a smaller degree of sexual dimorphism. It is more slender and has longer fingers and toes.

== Biology ==
=== Diet ===
The Tonkin snub-nosed monkey's diet consists of a range of leaves, fruits, flowers and seeds. It is a largely folivorous species with its diet consisting mainly of leaves that come from bamboo and evergreen trees. The Tonkin snub-nosed monkey has a strong jaw which allows it to chew the tough plant-based food that is part of its diet. The monkey also has a specialized digestive stomach that aids in the digestion of its plant-based diet. Bacteria in the stomach break down plant cellulose and provide it with more calories that can be expended into more energy.

=== Reproduction ===
The Tonkin snub-nosed monkey is a polygynous species, with one male mating with multiple females. Females reach reproductive maturity at about the age of four years old, while males reach reproductive maturity at about seven years old. A female can give birth to one or two offspring after a 200-day gestation period, with births typically occurring during the spring or summer months. It is speculated that female Tonkin snub-nosed monkeys are highly likely to be attentive to their young due to the observation of other female snub-nosed monkeys being attentive to their young.

Tonkin snub-nosed monkeys are likely eaten by arboreal snakes and large birds of prey as well as forest cats.

=== Lifespan ===
The typical lifespan recorded in colobine monkeys is about twenty years, with an age of twenty-nine years recorded in captivity. The lifespan of Tonkin snub-nosed monkeys has not been recorded as of yet.

=== Behavior ===
Tonkin snub-nosed monkeys are diurnal creatures, meaning they are active throughout the day and sleep during the night. They often sleep on lower tree branches near mountain slopes, so as to provide a barrier against cold winds. The monkey moves about the canopy of the forest in small groups. The Tonkin snub-nosed monkey commonly lives in an extended family group that includes an adult male and several females, and their offspring. The family often comes together to sleep and feed, but sightings of families have become rare due to decreased habitat and population over the past years.

Reports recorded by researchers have observed that these monkeys spend about forty percent of each day resting, about ten percent grooming one another, about twenty-three percent on guard for potential threats, and about three percent at play.

It has also been observed by researchers, hunters, and local residents that the Tonkin snub-nosed monkey often does not flee immediately upon human detection. Instead the monkey begins emitting loud and rapid alarm calls, with the lead male of the group often approaching the people. This behavior places the Tonkin snub-nosed monkey at a higher risk of being killed by hunters.

=== Genetics ===
A genetic diversity experiment based on mitochondrial information on the Tonkin snub-nosed monkey population in 2016 showed that there is a low amount of genetic variability in the population. This low diversity is likely a result of deforestation and intensive hunting of the species which led to population bottlenecks and restricted gene flow. A low amount of genetic diversity in a population is often associated with an increase in extinction, though there are examples of species that have persisted regardless of low genetic diversity.

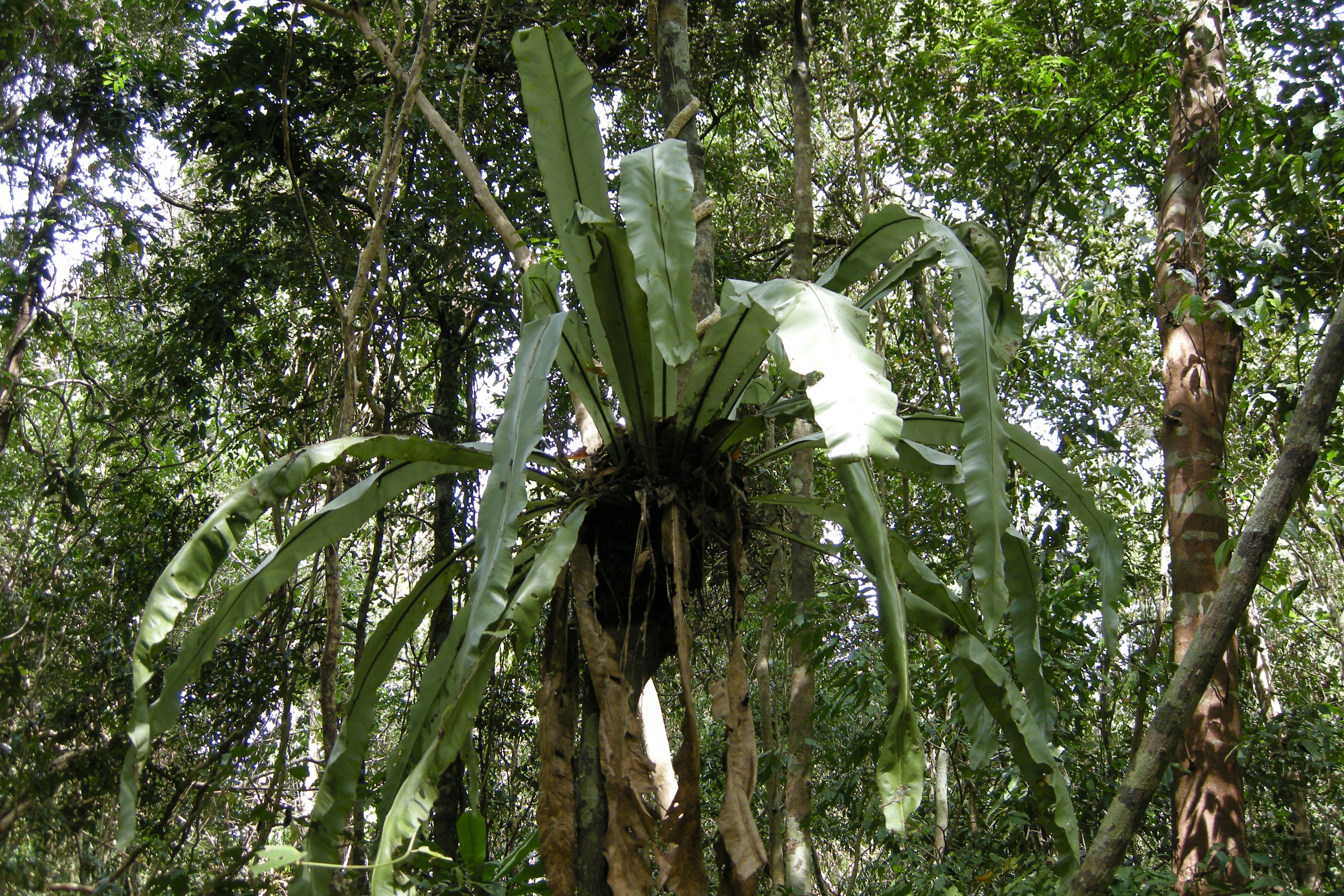
Forest habitat of Tonkin snub-nosed monkey

=== Habitat ===
The Tonkin snub-nosed monkey resides in primary forests which consist of bamboo and broadleaf evergreen. Recorded at elevations between 200 and 1,200 m (660 and 3,940 ft), its distribution is currently restricted to these forests which are located on hilltops and mountains created from karst limestone. The species' environment is also defined by its monsoon rainfall and tropical temperatures.

=== Ecological role ===
The ecological role of the Tonkin snub-nosed monkey is very similar to that of other herbivorous monkeys, in that they disperse seeds through their feces and help to regenerate the forest environment.

== Status ==
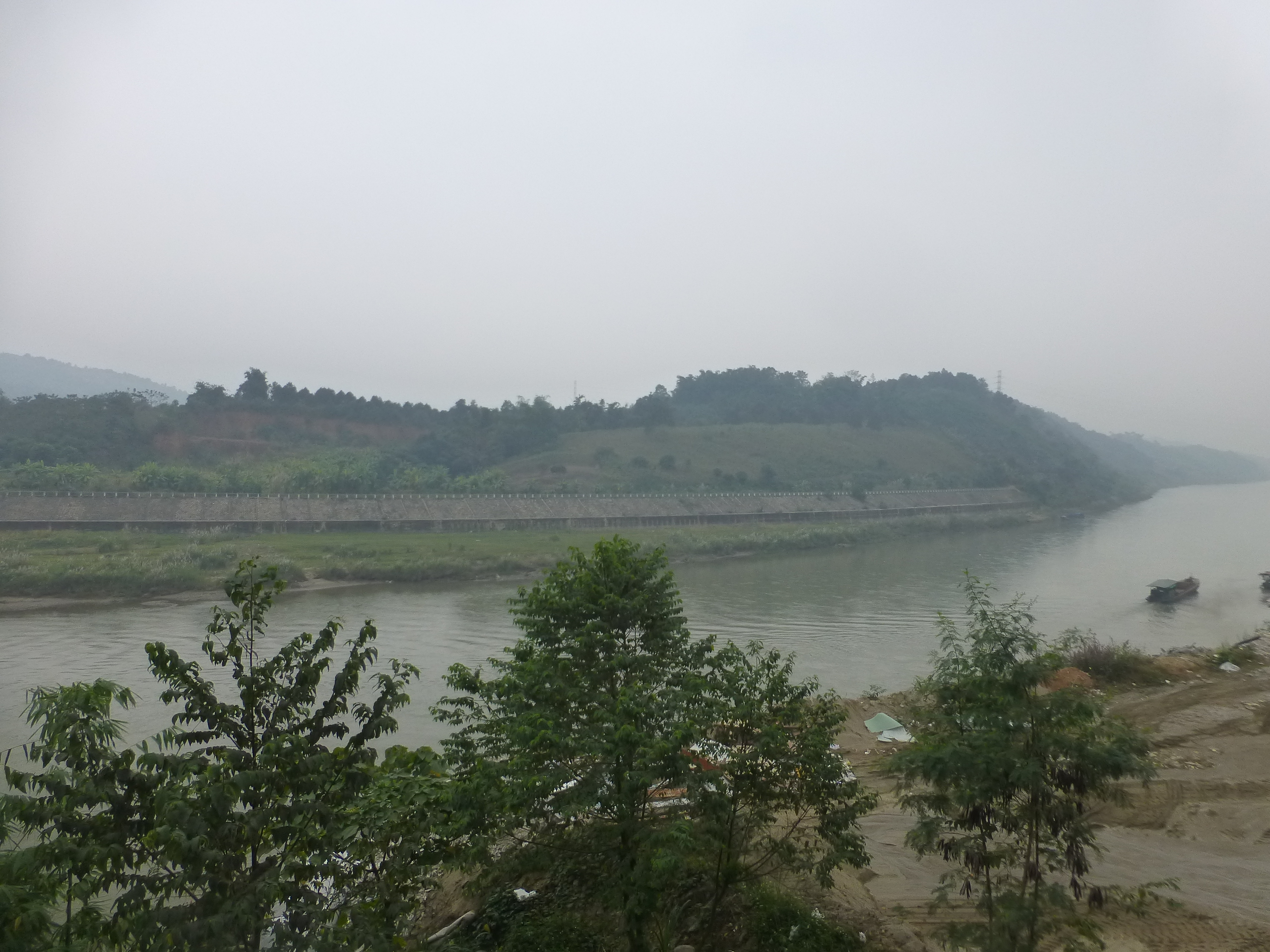
The Red River once used to be in the range of the Tonkin snub-nosed monkey before deforestation and human development.

Five isolated extant populations have been identified since its rediscovery. Despite being heralded as a flagship species and subsequently receiving international attention and conservation actions, the population trend is still declining. Its range once included areas to the east of Vietnam's Red River. Today, its populations can be found in small areas within Tuyen Quang, Bac Kan, Ha Giang, and Thai Nguyen provinces. The largest known population of the Tonkin snub-nosed monkey exists in the Khau Ca Species and Habitat Conservation Area, located in the Ha Giang province.

Habitat loss and hunting are some of the major causes for declines of naturally occurring populations of non-human primates, including the Tonkin snub-nosed monkey. Decades of expanding human population and increasing demands for scarce agriculturally viable lands have led to the loss and fragmentation of the monkey's habitats. Their habitats are suffering due to growing numbers of illegal logging in the forests, which restrict the Tonkin snub-nosed monkeys' actions as they live on the trees, and the occasional mining which causes polluted air and detrimental change in the environment for them. However, habitats of known Tonkin snub-nosed monkey populations were long lost and fragmented prior to their rediscovery. A pioneering study in 1993, in Na Hang Nature Reserve in Vietnam, obtained a population count of 72 individuals (estimated 80), and a subsequent study at the same site in 2005 obtained a population count of 17 individuals (estimated 22). Evidenced by both primary and secondary data, the population decline within that 13-year period can only be attributed to hunting activities.

Heavy poaching for food, as well as the wildlife black market, and the destruction of habitat are also the main reasons why the Tonkin snub-nosed monkey is considered one of the planet's most critically endangered primate species. In 1993, hunting and wildlife trapping were widespread through the Na Hang Nature Reserve, with ethnic groups harvesting many species, including the Tonkin snub-nosed monkey. The monkey was hunted for its meat that was eaten by some groups, although it was not considered very appealing, or for prized body parts. These body parts included the stomach, along with its digested plant matter, of the Tonkin snub-nosed monkey, its bones for being prepared into a medicinal balm for curing chronic musculoskeletal disorders, or other parts to be prepared to cure fatigue. The wildlife poaching was alerted to the Na Hang District People's Committee, which succeeded in curbing the hunting and trapping activities throughout the reserve. Hunting and trapping of wildlife increased once again due to local residents having to supplement the need of goods and food of incoming workers in their area, causing the locals to rely on the forest for produce.

Sightings of the monkey have become increasingly rare. The primate was thought to be extinct until the 1990s, when a small population was discovered in Na Hang District in Tuyên Quang Province of Vietnam. By 2008, when a small population with three infants was discovered in a remote forest, fewer than 250 of the primates were thought to exist. In December 2013, Fauna & Flora International released the result of a population survey conducted between September and October of that year in the Khau Ca Species and Habitat Conservation Area, Ha Giang province, Vietnam. The survey identified between 108–113 individuals alive in the conservation zone, nearly half of the standing estimate for world population and the highest number at the site since populations began to be monitored. Researchers took this as an encouraging sign that conservation efforts were making an impact on the species' steeply declining numbers. The latest survey, as of November 2017, carried out by Fauna & Flora international in Khau Ca forest in April 2017 recorded at least 113–121 individuals making this area home to the largest known population of Tonkin snub-nosed monkeys.

== Conservation efforts ==
Fauna & Flora International has been focused on making an impact to the Tonkin snub-nosed monkey population. In order to protect the two largest known populations, located in Khau Ca in Vietnam and in a forest fragment near the border of China, Fauna & Flora International has been working with local communities to spread awareness about the species and monitor its habitat. Vietnamese authorities were also brought on to the plan to ensure that the Khau Ca forest was formally protected, with population size increasing and stabilizing since these efforts have been made. The Tonkin snub-nosed monkey has been receiving awareness about its critical endangerment, but there is still much to be done to secure its stability and survival.

The Tonkin snub-nosed monkey is also listed in Appendix I of the Convention on International Trade in Endangered Species (CITES) and is protected under the Vietnamese law, which prohibits the capture, killing, and trade of this species. However, these laws are not very effective towards the species and are largely ignored and difficult to enforce.

Two other conservation areas, the Du Gia Nature Reserve and Cham Chu Nature Reserve, were also instituted to protect the Tonkin snub-nosed monkey population and its habitat in those areas, yet hunting still occurs within these "protected" areas.

Conservationists have stressed the importance of local community engagement in order to better the status of the Tonkin snub-nosed monkey. Conservationists know that if locals continue to struggle to earn a living, it will cause their socioeconomic standards to remain low and awareness and education about the Tonkin snub-nosed monkey will have no effect on its conservation status. To counter this problem, conservationists have come up with innovations to educate local residents about the species and help them with their living. These innovations include providing training and employment to local residents as a way to ensure their support of the cause. Offering residents positions and roles in helping their environment and the Tonkin snub-nosed species will help further ensure that there is a chance of improvement and survival of this critically endangered species.

On July 21, 2022, Fauna & Flora International and the People's Committee of Ha Giang signed a memorandum of acknowledging the conservation of the Tonkin snub-nosed monkey and other flora species in the area of the Ha Giang province during 2022-2027. The two sides will conduct scientific research regarding the habitats, behaviors, and populations of the monkey and flora species, will recover and expand their forest habitat, prevent and reduce human-related threats to the species, apply advanced technologies to conservation and awareness improvement, and help with capacity building for those involved in the biodiversity conservation. This is a first step towards community involvement in the conservation of the Tonkin snub-nosed monkey. The two organizations involved will establish a sustainable financial mechanism for forest conservation through community facilitation and payment for forest environmental services and those related to it.
