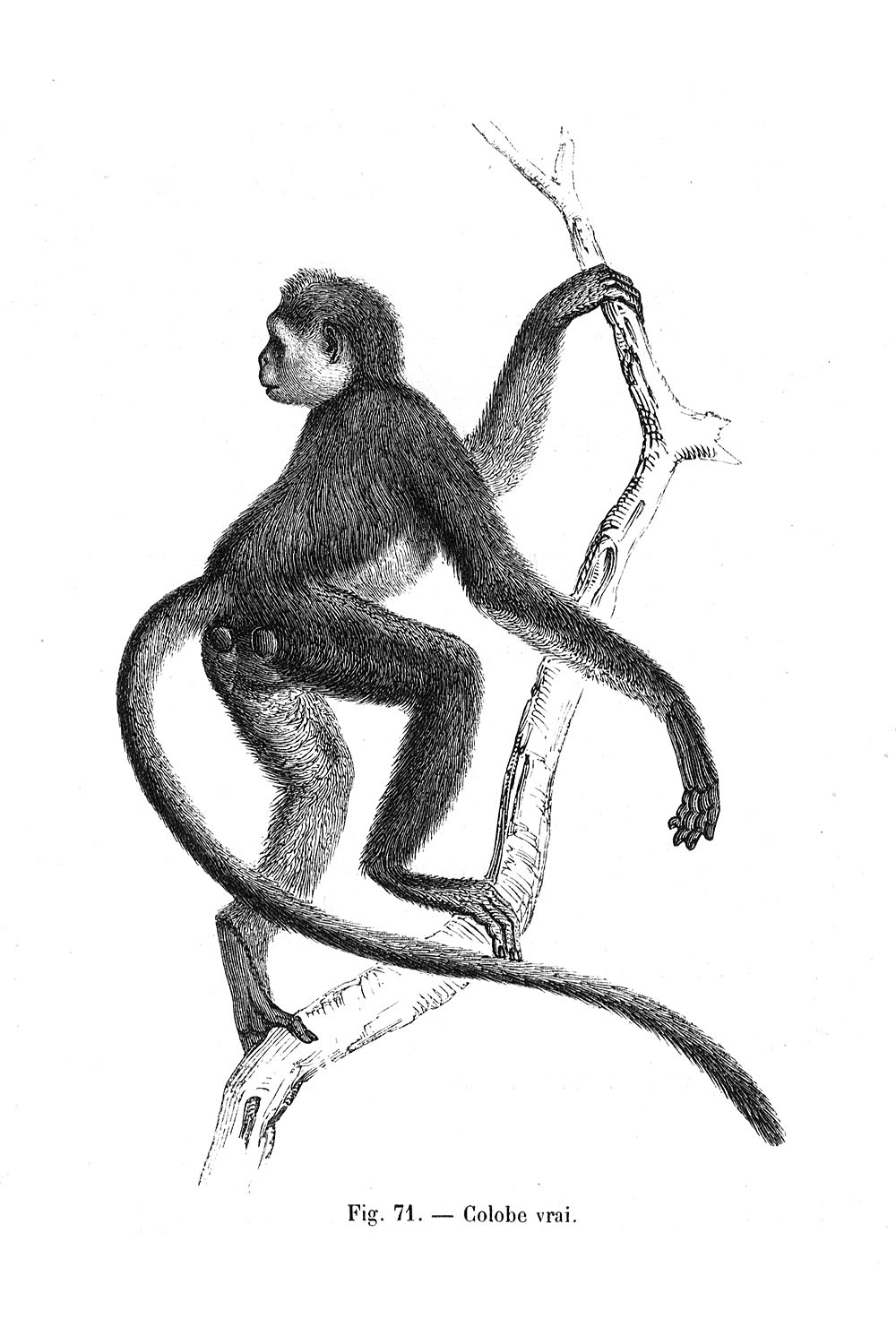

Conservation status
- Vulnerable (IUCN 3.1)

Scientific classification
- Kingdom: Animalia
- Phylum: Chordata
- Class: Mammalia
- Infraclass: Placentalia
- Order: Primates
- Family: Cercopithecidae
- Subfamily: Colobinae
- Tribe: Colobini
- Genus: Procolobus; Rochebrune, 1877
- Species: P. verus

Binomial name
- Procolobus verus (van Beneden, 1838)
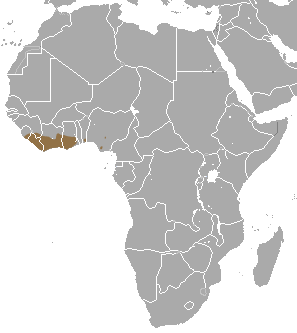
- Olive colobus range

= Olive colobus =

Species of Old World monkey

The olive colobus monkey (Procolobus verus), also known as the green colobus or Van Beneden's colobus, is a species of primate in the family Cercopithecidae. It is the only species in the genus Procolobus, which formerly also included other species that are now grouped in a separate genus Piliocolobus. Its English name refers to its dull olive upperparts. It is the smallest example of all colobine monkeys and is rarely observed in its natural habitat because of its cryptic coloration and secretive nature. It is found in the rain forests of West Africa, ranging from southern Sierra Leone to Nigeria. The IUCN Red List classifies the olive colobus as vulnerable (previously near threatened), with the cause of its decline attributed to habitat loss and hunting. Though much of the land within the range of the olive colobus has been affected by human activities, it retains its ability to thrive in small degraded forest fragments.

== Description ==
Procolobus verus is a small-bodied mammal with an average body weight of 4.6 kilograms for males and 4.1 kilograms for females. The olive colobus are greenish-brown in color with the hairs transitioning from greenish-yellow at the root, and becoming darker towards the tip. The under side of the olive colobus is lighter in color and the hairs found on the face are stiff and dark. Their coloration allows them to stay camouflaged within the trees reducing the risk of predation. Like all colobine monkeys, olive colobuses have a unique feature in that in their hands, their thumbs are severely reduced, while their feet retain fully functional big toes. The feet of the olive colobus are also abnormally large compared to other African colobine species.

=== Diet ===
The natural habitat of the olive colobus includes second growth within tall forests, palm forests and swamps, where they feed in the lower and middle vegetation strata. The olive colobus is mainly folivorous, although it may consume fruits and seeds when available. The diet consists primarily of young leaves, and they tend to avoid mature leaf parts altogether. This is related to the fact that it is a forestomach fermenter with a small body size, which requires it to obtain a very high quality diet. The fact that olive colobus monkeys utilize this type of fermentation also relates to their lack of fruit consumption, because fruits that contain high levels of acid can overly lower the pH of the stomach, causing negative and sometimes lethal effects on microorganisms living within it.

== Behavior ==
The olive colobus monkey is a very cryptic and shy animal, which can make the observation and understanding of its behavior difficult. What is known about interactions between olive colobus monkeys and other related species shows that their social structure is very complex. Olive colobus monkeys are found in small groups containing multiple breeding males, several females, and their infants. Though found in groups of only a few individuals, olive colobus monkeys are almost always seen in association with other monkeys, particularly the Diana monkey, Cercopithecus diana. There have been many suggestions as to how this relationship benefits the olive colobus, such as reducing the risk of predation. A piece of evidence that gives support to this idea is the willingness of the olive colobus to travel to higher altitudes in the tree tops to feed when other species are nearby.

In addition to serving as a means of predator avoidance, the close association with Diana monkeys is a mechanism used by male olive colobus monkeys to obtain new female mates. The olive colobus mating system is unique in that unlike many species living in small groups, there is no evidence of male monopolization over females. It has been proposed that females use aspects of their reproductive biology(long receptive periods, promiscuous mating, and mating overlap among females) along with mating behaviors to limit the monopolization of males in a group. Benefits to the avoidance of male monopolization include direct or indirect female mate choice, decreasing the risk of infanticide, and increased paternal care for offspring.

== Conservation ==
The olive colobus monkey is very susceptible to habitat loss due to increased encroachment of hunters and farmers on both protected and unprotected lands. In order to ensure that this threatened species is protected, the olive colobus has been listed under Appendix II of CITES (the Convention on International Trade in Endangered Species of Wild Fauna and Flora) and as a Class A species under the African Convention on the Conservation of Nature and Natural Resources, which monitor the international trade of species and their status in the environment. The olive colobus is also covered in many protected areas including Taï National Park on the Ivory Coast of West Africa, which was declared a Forest and Wildlife Refuge in 1926 and accepted as a biosphere reserve in 1982. The park has a total area of 330,000 hectares, plus a 20,000-hectare buffer zone, where new plantations and settlement are prohibited.

Though efforts have been established in order to protect the olive colobus monkey and its habitat, illegal farming and hunting are still a fundamental threat to this species' survival. To ensure that the olive colobus will thrive in the future, stricter enforcement of laws and regulations should be implemented, as well as the development of educational and public awareness plans. The olive colobus will also benefit from further study and observation.
