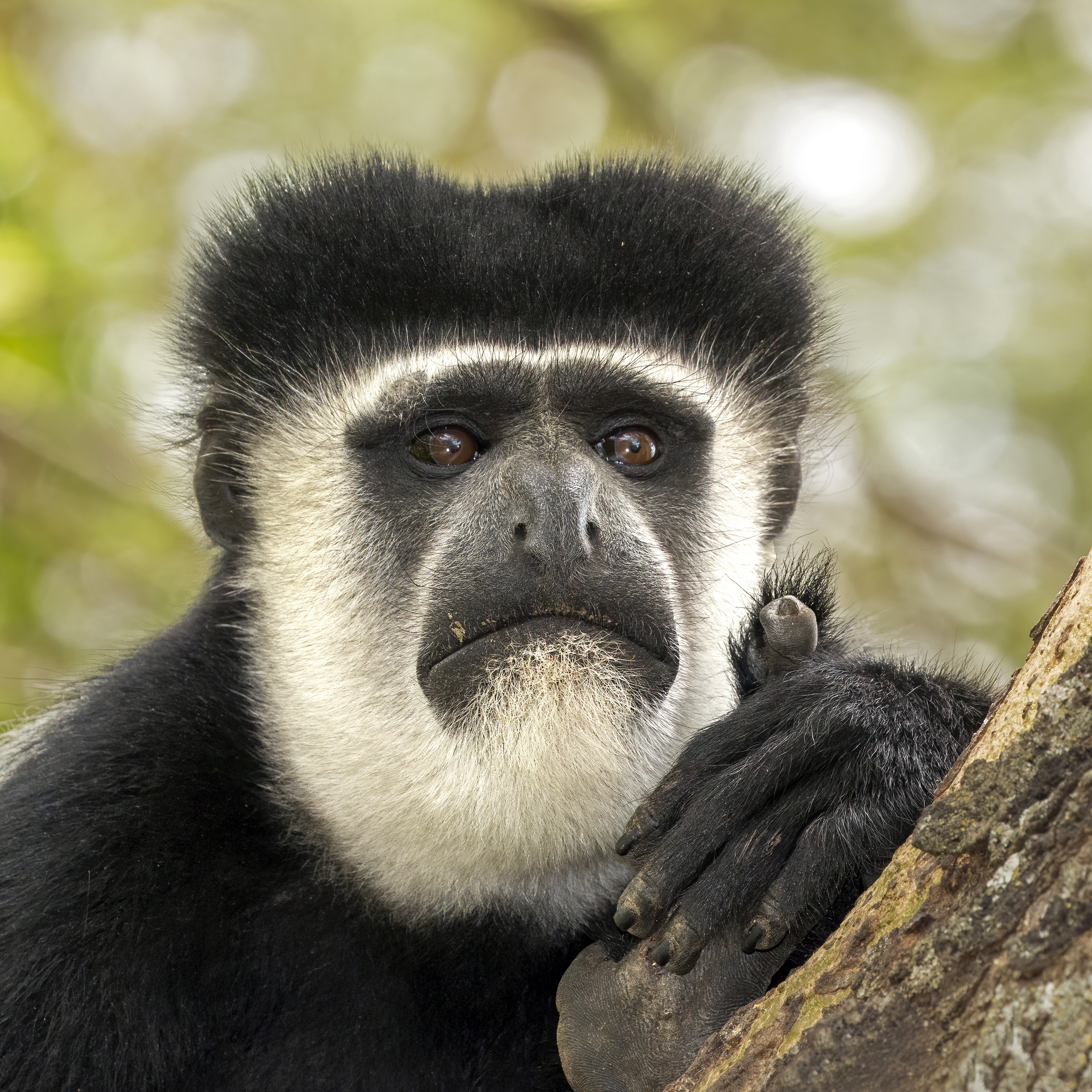
- Colobus guereza matschiei

Scientific classification
- Kingdom: Animalia
- Phylum: Chordata
- Class: Mammalia
- Order: Primates
- Family: Cercopithecidae
- Subfamily: Colobinae
- Tribe: Colobini; Jerdon, 1867

Genera
- See text

= Colobini =

Tribe of Old World monkeys

Colobini is a tribe of Old World monkeys that includes all of the black-and-white colobus, red colobus, and olive colobus monkeys.

== Classification ==
- Family Cercopithecidae
  - Subfamily Cercopithecinae
  - Subfamily Colobinae
    - Tribe Colobini
      - Genus Colobus - black-and-white colobus monkeys
      - Genus Piliocolobus - red colobus monkeys
      - Genus Procolobus - olive colobus
      - †Genus Cercopithecoides
    - Tribe Presbytini
      - Langur (leaf monkey) group
      - Odd-nosed group
