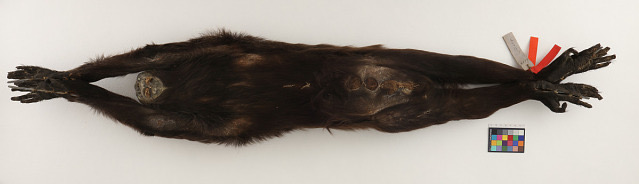
- A Simias concolor specimen

Conservation status
- Critically Endangered (IUCN 3.1)
- CITES Appendix I

Scientific classification
- Kingdom: Animalia
- Phylum: Chordata
- Class: Mammalia
- Order: Primates
- Family: Cercopithecidae
- Subfamily: Colobinae
- Tribe: Presbytini
- Genus: Simias; Miller, 1903
- Species: S. concolor

Binomial name
- Simias concolor Miller, 1903
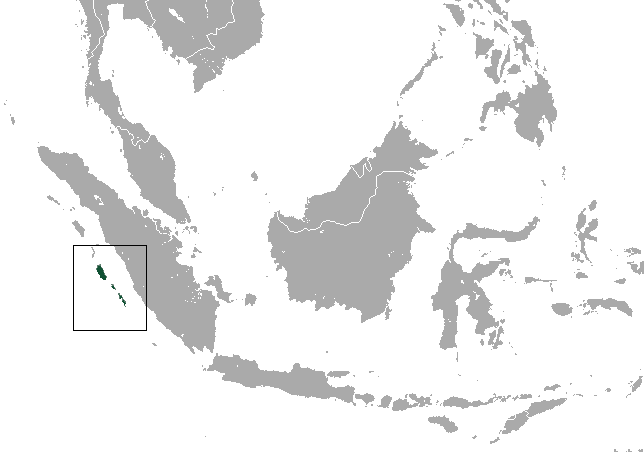
- Pig-tailed langur range

= Pig-tailed langur =

Species of Old World monkey

The pig-tailed langur (Simias concolor), monotypic in genus Simias, is a large Old World monkey, endemic to several small islands off the coast of Sumatra in Indonesia. Its face is black, its fur is black-brown and it has a relatively short tail. It is a diurnal species, feeding in the rainforest canopy on leaves, and to a lesser extent, fruit and berries. Little is known of its natural history, but it is heavily hunted, its populations have been declining rapidly and the International Union for Conservation of Nature has assessed its conservation status as being "critically endangered". It has been included on a list of the World's 25 Most Endangered Primates.

As an arboreal primate the pig-tailed langur spends most of its time in the canopy devoting the majority of its activity budget towards resting and feeding. The structure of groups is single-male, multi-female. Group sizes range from around 3 to 9 individuals depending on locations and hunting pressures. There are two subspecies of this primate, Simias concolor concolor which lives in the southern Mentawai islands, and Simias concolor siberu which lives exclusively in the northern island of Siberut. Sexual dimorphism and sexual swelling is exhibited by this species.

Population estimates from the 1980s compared to data from the 2000s show a decrease in population size. The northern island of Siberut shows a greater abundance of this species in comparison to the southern Mentawai islands. This can largely be attributed to the difference in conservation efforts as much of northern Siberut has been declared a national park whereas the southern islands have historically been devastated by commercial logging. This species is subject to hunting by local inhabitants. The reduction in forest cover has allowed for greater levels of human activity and settlement which facilitates hunting, especially in the southern islands where most areas are unprotected.

== Description ==
The pig-tailed langur is a large and rather heavily built Old World monkey, adapted to climbing with its long arms. Its fur is black-brown, and its hairless face is also black. It is the only monkey in the subfamily Colobinae to have a relatively short tail; the tail is only slightly furred and is only 15 cm (5.9 in) long. The short nose is pointed upward. The pig-tailed langur reaches a full grown length of approximately 50 cm (20 in) and a weight of 7 kg (15 lb).

Sexual dimorphism is exhibited by this species with adult males being larger and heavier than adult females. Sexual swelling is exhibited by this species which is rare for single male multi female groups of Colobinae monkeys.

== Classification ==
Phylogenetic analyses identify this species as the sister taxon to the proboscis monkey (Nasalis larvatus).

== Diet ==
It is an omnivore with a diet consisting of leaves, flowers, fruits and occasionally insects. The availability of these foods in this area are abundant especially in unripe and ripe fruits. Leaves are the most abundant in their diet followed by fruits. As with all other Colobinae primates, this species is diurnal.

== Distribution and social systems ==
This primate is endemic to the Mentawai Islands, there are two subspecies, Simias concolor concolor also known as simasepsep which resides on the southern islands of Sipora, North Pagai, and South Pagai. The second subspecies is Simias concolor siberut also known as simakobou which lives only on the island of Siberut. It is a diurnal and arboreal rain forest dweller, often spending most of its time in the canopy but occasionally comes to ground. The activity budget of this primate is mostly resting and feeding with a small fraction of time devoted towards travel and social behavior. Some studies in the Siberut area show relatively low group sizes (mean group size 2.6). Other parts in Siberut show relatively high group sizes (mean group size 8.7). The reason for different group sizes is not factually known, however many researchers suggest that it could be due to anthropogenic factors such as hunting and deforestation. The pig-tailed langur has single-male, multi-female groups. The mating system of this species follows a polygynous structure although it was originally thought to be monogamous.

== Endangerment status and threats to conservation ==
This species is classified as Critically endangered by the International Union for Conservation of Nature. It was classified as Endangered (IUCN status) up until 2008 were the endangerment status was changed to Critically Endangered. It is among The World's 25 Most Endangered Primates due to the many anthropogenic pressures it faces on the islands which include, destruction of forest for commercial use, hunting and illegal pet trade. Population size estimates have been conducted across many years with varying islands being chosen for research areas. In the 1980s population estimates of the Pig-tailed langur was 19,000 on the island of Siberut and 26,000 across all four islands. In 2004 Lisa M. Paciulli dedicated their PhD dissertation towards studying threats to Mentawai island primates and determining population densities associated with logging pressures. Population estimates were found to be around 6,700-17,300 across all islands with a large amount of variation being attributed due to hunting and logging pressures. Population densities were 2.5 individuals/km^{2} in logged areas whereas unlogged areas had a population density of 5 individuals/km^{2}.

An extensive population density survey was conducted by the University of Indonesia on four endemic Mentawai primates. This research was exclusive to the southern Mentawai islands and included a variety of survey areas, most of which devastated by commercial logging. The results of the 2008–2009 surveys are population densities of 1.5 groups/km^{2} on the island of Sipora and 2.1 ± 0.3 groups/km^{2} on the Pagai islands with group sizes around 3 individuals. Research into population densities on the northern Mentawai island of Siberut is more abundant due to the lower mean population densities of humans living on this island as well as the considerable amount of forestry that remains in comparison to the southern Mentawai islands. In northern Siberut researchers in the Peleonan forest conducted population density surveys from July to December 2005. Results form these surveys show a mean density of 16.2 groups/km^{2}.

One of the main factors associated with the population decline of this species is habitat disturbance from commercial logging operations. Forestry cover varies significantly among the islands. The island of Siberut has most of its area declared as a National park whereas the southern islands of Sipora, North Pagai, and South Pagai have limited areas of forestry conservation. It is estimated that Siberut's forest cover decreased from 3,500 km^{2} to 2,400 km^{2} and the southern Mentawai islands of Sipora and Pagai have decreased from 1300 km^{2} to 300 km^{2}. The reason for Siberut's extensive forestry cover in comparison to the southern islands is due to historical conservation efforts. Much of the efforts started in the 1980s with the help of UNESCO man and the Biosphere reserve. This was expanded in the 1990s were a large portion of Siberut was declared a National Park. The declaration of this National Park allowed for hunting and logging operations to be significantly reduced; although areas around the national park still experience pressures of logging and conversions to commercial palm oil plantations through concessions and illegal activities. Many of the areas in the southern Mentawai islands have experienced heavy logging operations that have left little forestry for the Mentawai primates. Most of the forestry has now been reduced from primary forestry to secondary forestry which is troubling since the pig-tailed langur thrives in arboreal environments.

The reduction on forestry in the southern Mentawai islands creates a domino effect of paving new land for more human activities and settlement. The second main factor associated with the population decline of this species is hunting. Local inhabitants have historically used arrows and poisonous materials to hunt this species. However technological advancements of firearms have facilitated the hunting of this species, especially since it is one of the largest primates on these islands. Many local inhabitants hunt this species because it is considered a delicacy, with many locals saying it has the best tasting meat compared to other primates. Population density data suggests that an increase in hunting pressure at survey sites results in lower population densities of this primate.

== Subspecies ==
- Genus Simias
  - Pig-tailed langur, Simias concolor
    - Simias concolor concolor
    - Simias concolor siberu

== Predation ==
The only known predator of pig-tailed langurs are humans. Other large predators on the Mentawai Islands include crested serpent eagles and reticulated pythons, both may also prey on pig-tailed langurs.
