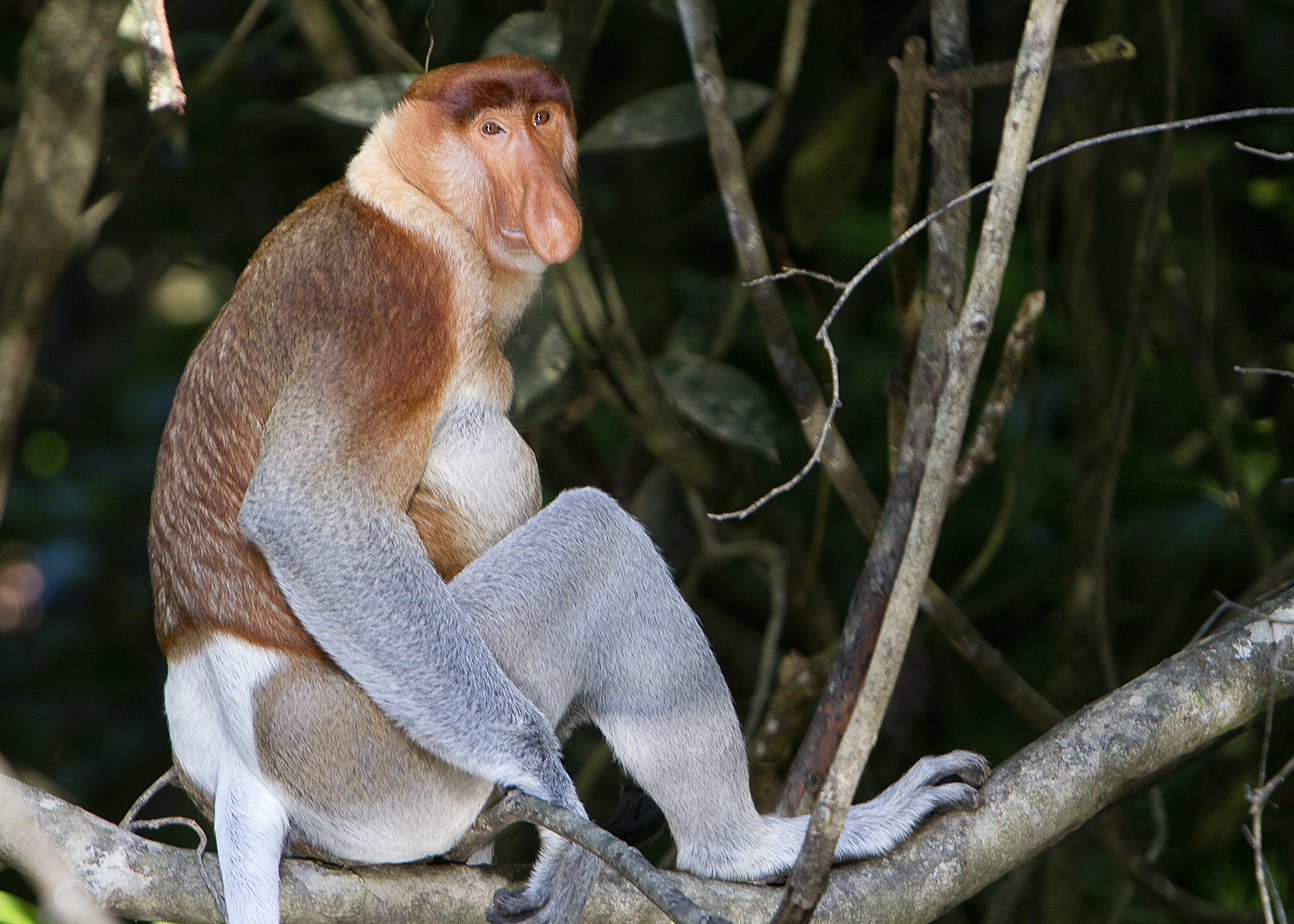
- Nasalis larvatus

Scientific classification
- Kingdom: Animalia
- Phylum: Chordata
- Class: Mammalia
- Order: Primates
- Family: Cercopithecidae
- Subfamily: Colobinae
- Tribe: Presbytini; Gray, 1825

Type genus
- Presbytis Eschscholtz, 1821

Genera
- See text

= Presbytini =

Tribe of Old World monkeys

Presbytini is a tribe of Old World monkeys that includes all of the Asian colobine monkeys.

== Classification ==
- Family Cercopithecidae
  - Subfamily Cercopithecinae
  - Subfamily Colobinae
    - Tribe Colobini
    - Tribe Presbytini
      - Langur (leaf monkey) group
        - Genus Trachypithecus - lutungs
        - Genus Presbytis - surilis
        - Genus Semnopithecus - gray langurs
      - Odd-nosed group
        - Genus Pygathrix - doucs
        - Genus Rhinopithecus - snub-nosed monkeys
        - Genus Nasalis - proboscis monkey
        - Genus Simias - pig-tailed langur
        - †Genus Mesopithecus
