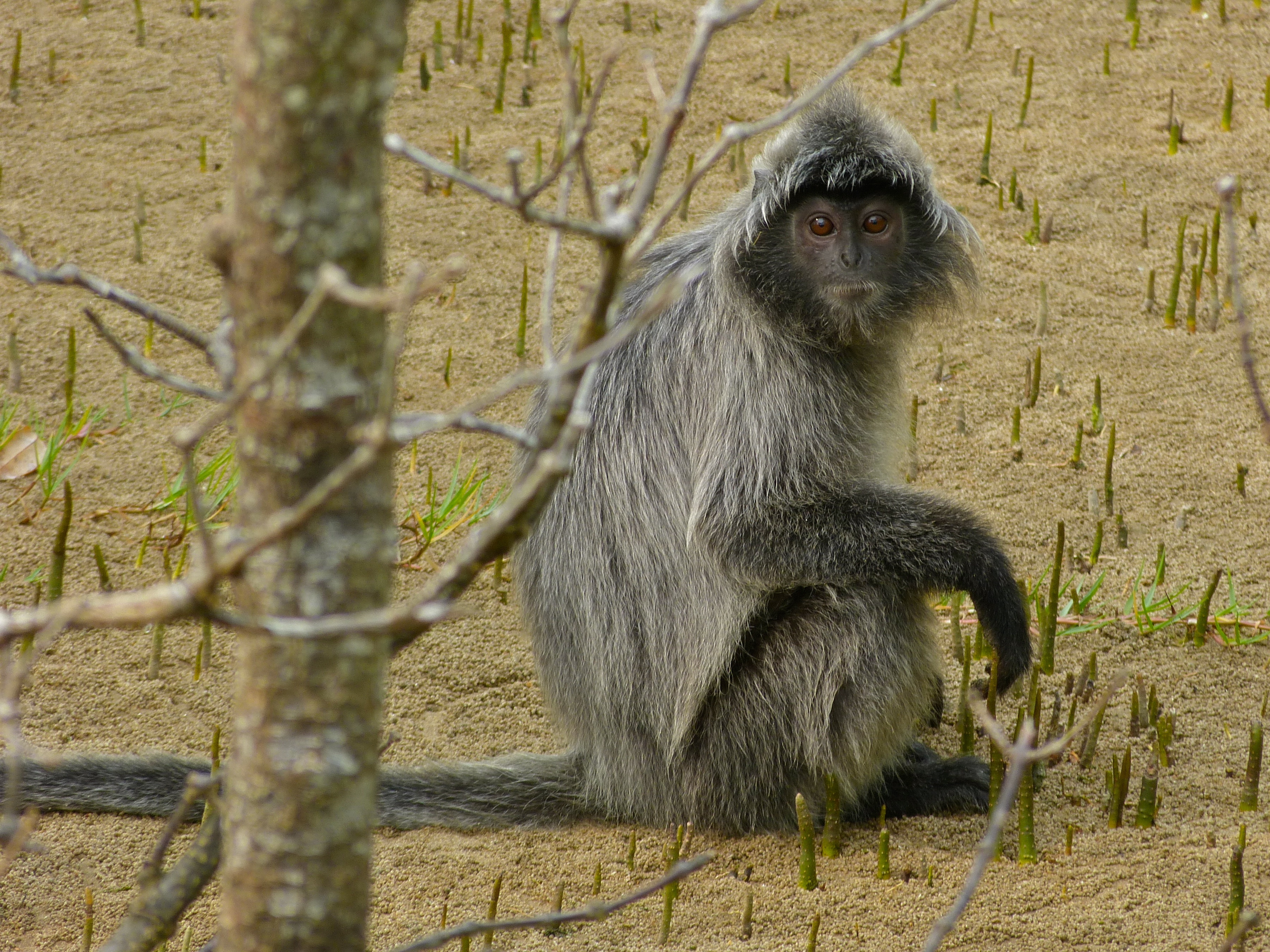
- At Bako National Park, Sarawak, Malaysia

Conservation status
- Vulnerable (IUCN 3.1)

Scientific classification
- Kingdom: Animalia
- Phylum: Chordata
- Class: Mammalia
- Order: Primates
- Family: Cercopithecidae
- Genus: Trachypithecus
- Species group: Trachypithecus cristatus group
- Species: T. cristatus

Binomial name
- Trachypithecus cristatus Raffles, 1821
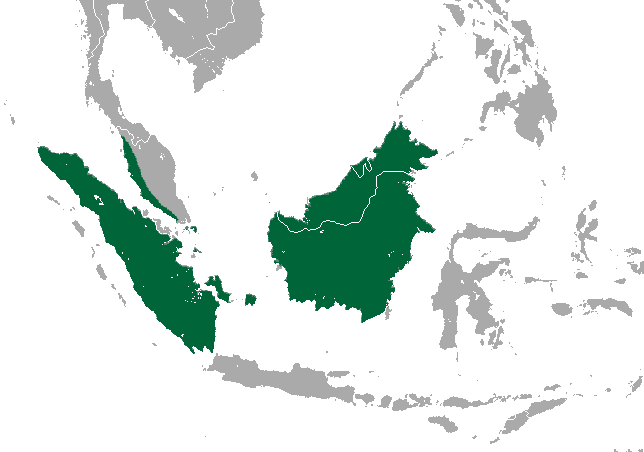
- Silvery lutung range

Synonyms
- Presbytis cristata

= Silvery lutung =

Species of Old World monkey

The silvery lutung (Trachypithecus cristatus), also known as the silvered leaf monkey or the silvery langur, is an Old World monkey. It is arboreal, living in coastal, mangrove, and riverine forests in Sumatra, Borneo, Java, as well as in parts of the southwestern Malay Peninsula, the Natuna Islands, and other nearby islands. It is the type species of its species group.

== Description ==
The silvery lutung is a medium-sized monkey with a long, non-prehensile tail. It has grey-tipped, dark brown or black fur, giving it a uniform silvery appearance. Unlike some related species, there are no paler markings on the face or body, except for a patch of whitish hair on the groin of females. A crest of fur runs along the top of the head, and the hair on the cheeks is long, often obscuring the ears. The hands and feet are hairless, with dark-coloured skin, and have opposable thumbs and toes.

Females range from 46 to 51 centimetres (18 to 20 in) in head-body length, with an average weight of 5.7 kilograms (13 lb) and a tail length of 67 to 75 centimetres (26 to 30 in). Males are slightly larger, from 50 to 58 centimetres (20 to 23 in) in length, with an average weight of 6.6 kilograms (15 lb) and a tail length of 67 to 75 centimetres (26 to 30 in).

Like other langurs, the silvery lutung has a large three-chambered stomach to digest the cellulose found in its herbivorous diet. This allows for fermentation of food, and has some similarities with the stomach of ruminants. The intestine is unusually long, even compared to those of other langurs, and has several pouches along its length, which carry out further fermentation of plant matter. The teeth have grinding ridges and other modifications to allow the more efficient processing of tough leaves.

== Distribution and habitat ==
The silvery lutung is found across Borneo, Sumatra, and Java, as well as in parts of the southwestern Malay Peninsula, the Natuna Islands, and other nearby islands. It inhabits mangrove swamps and nearby forest regions and generally avoids travelling far from coasts or rivers.

== Taxonomy ==
The number and identity of subspecies of the silvery lutung is currently debated. A 2008 analysis confirms the presence of only two subspecies:

- Trachypithecus cristatus cristatus - Borneo, Sumatra, Natuna Islands
- Trachypithecus cristatus selangorensis - Malay Peninsula

The Malay Peninsula form has been subsequently elevated to a separate species, the Selangor silvered langur T. selangorensis

However, some sources distinguish the silvery lutungs of the Natuna Islands as a separate subspecies, T. c. vigilans.

== Evolution ==
Genetic analysis has shown that the silvery lutung probably first evolved during a rapid speciation event that occurred between 0.95 and 1.25 million years ago, during which all the living species of the T. cristatus species group evolved. Because of the relative speed and diversity of this event, the species of the group are difficult to distinguish genetically, and there is some uncertainty as to which represents genuinely distinct species. However, the closest living relative of the silvery lutung may be the Javan lutung, although silvery lutungs have also been reported to produce hybrids with Phayre's leaf monkey, generally considered to belong to a different species group.

Fossils of the species are known from the late Pleistocene onwards and occupy the same geographic range as today. Some of these fossils had significantly larger cheek teeth than living animals, although they have not been assigned to a distinct subspecies.

=== Hybridization ===
In Sabah, Malaysia, silvery lutungs have been observed in mixed-species groups with proboscis monkeys, and interspecific mating and a possible hybrid, nicknamed the Bornean mystery monkey, has been observed. The suspected hybrid was first sighted when it was a juvenile near the Kinabatangan River in Malaysian Borneo. Researchers began monitoring the animal and analyzing photos of it as it matured which led to the conclusion it was an extremely rare phenomenon. Researchers say hybridization between closely related species is not unheard of, however, the offspring of two distantly related species is rarely observed in the wild, going on to say this particular hybrid is only the second time intergeneric hybridization (offspring resulting from the matings between different genera) has been recorded in wild primates. Hybrid animals are often infertile, particularly with distantly related species, because it causes malfunctions in the chromosomes. However, a photo of the animal as an adult showed her holding an infant that she appeared to be nursing. Researchers believe this may be a result of the two species being confined to a small patch of riverine forest due to deforestation to plant oil palm trees, a form of habitat fragmentation, that created a segregated population of both species.

== Behaviour and ecology ==
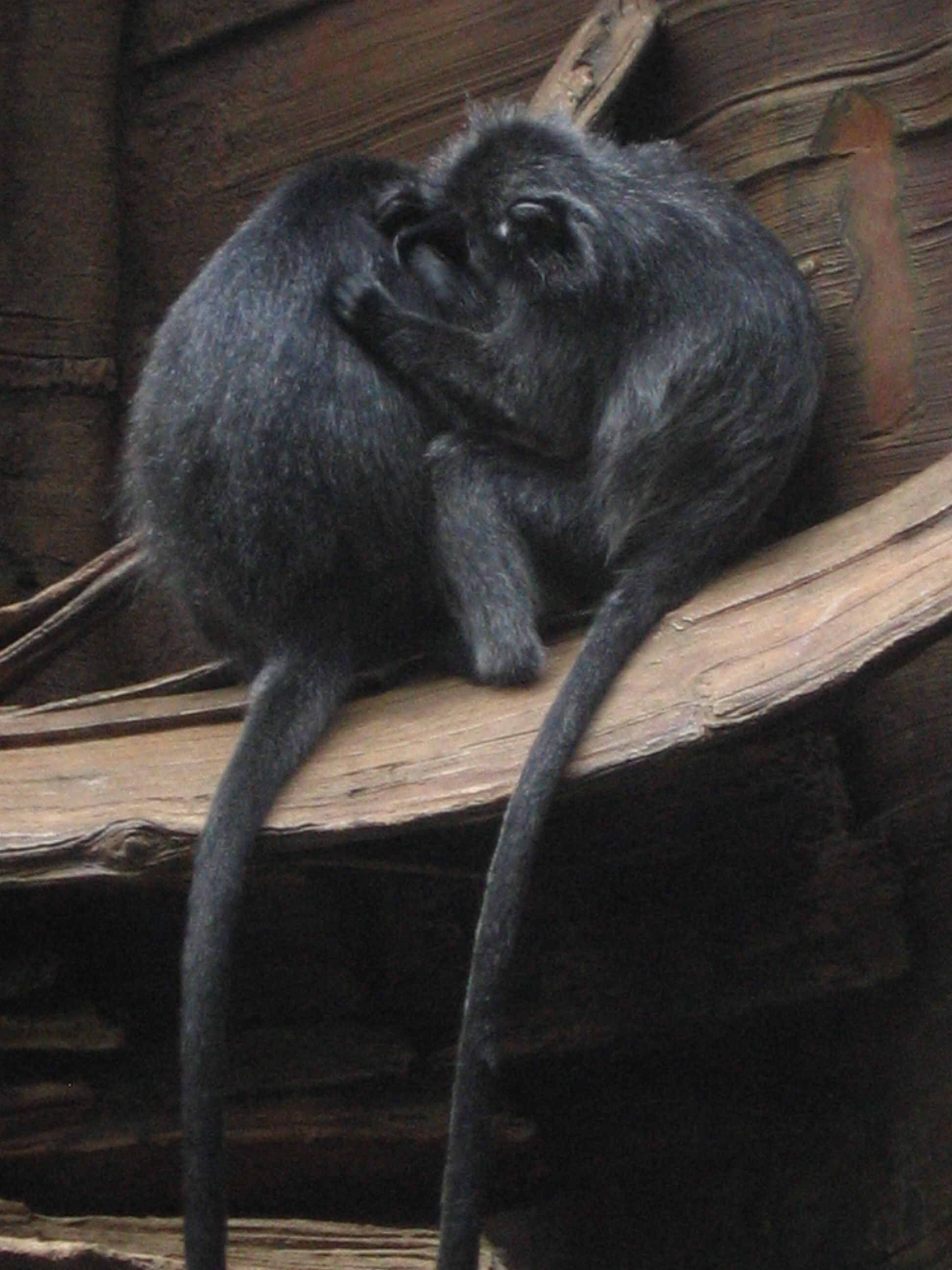
Silvery lutungs grooming

Silvery lutungs are diurnal, and travel in groups of around 9-40 individuals with one adult male and many adult females communally caring for infants. They rarely leave the trees, which provide them protection from ground-dwelling predators, and rapidly flee if threatened. Each group occupies a home range of 20 to 43 ha (49 to 106 acres), although these may overlap with those of neighbouring groups. During the day, individuals may travel up to 500 m (1,600 ft) through the forest, with some forming all-female subgroups that separate from the group containing the male. The entire group shelters in a single tree at night.

The social structure of silvery lutungs is matrilineal and harem based. Females remain in the group for life, while males leave shortly after reaching adulthood, living in small groups of their own until they can take over an established harem. Within the group, males dominate the females, and females with young dominate those without. However, there is relatively little aggression within the group compared with some related species.

Because group ranges often overlap, different groups frequently come into contact with one another. The adult male protects his group and territory from competing males, communicating his dominance to other males via vocalizations and fighting. In the absence of males, however, females from different groups are more likely to interact peacefully. The most serious conflicts occur when a male intrudes directly on the territory of another male, which may result in the intruder displacing the resident and taking control of the group. In many other primates, such a displacement would normally be followed by the male-killing any infants sired by his predecessor; although this may occur in silvery lutungs, it has not been directly observed and may be less common than in some other species.

Although less vocal than other closely related species, silvery lutungs make at least thirteen different vocalisations, with the most common being used by adult males defending their territory. Other vocalisations express fear, anger, excitement, and satisfaction, in addition to various calls made by infants.

=== Diet ===
The silvery lutung is a specialist folivore, including a higher proportion of leaves in its diet than any other colobine monkey. Although it does also eat fruit, and some seeds and flowers, these comprise only 9% of the diet, and it is also able to feed on tougher and more mature leaves than any of its close relatives. Because of these differences, silvery lutungs do not normally live in the same parts of the forest as other monkeys. Where other species are found in the same area, silvery lutungs are more commonly found in the middle canopy of the forest, leaving the higher branches to monkeys with a more frugivorous diet.

=== Reproduction ===
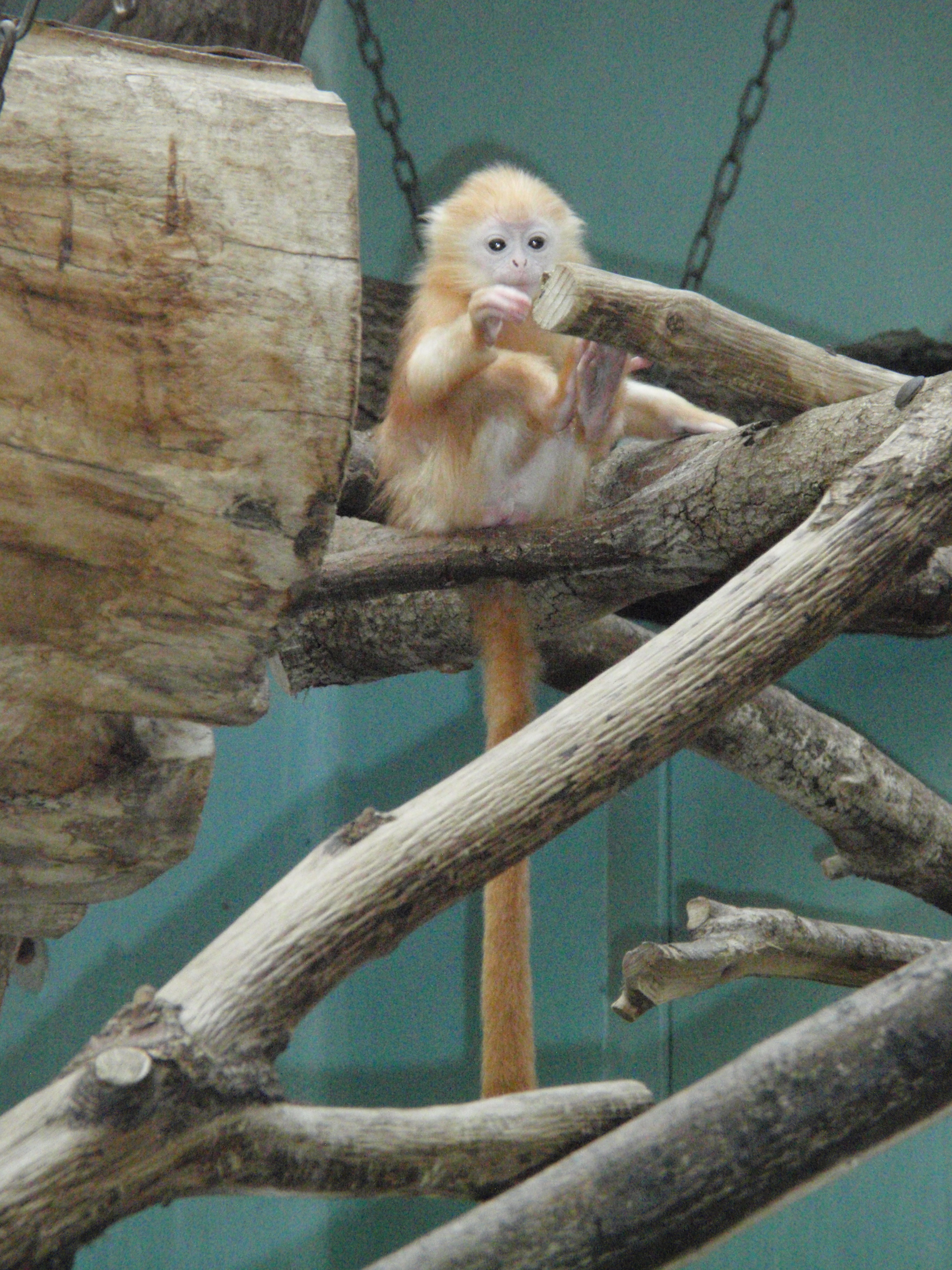
Infant silvery lutung, showing orange fur and pale skin

Silvery lutungs breed year round, with no clear breeding season, although each female typically gives birth no more than once every 18 to 24 months. The female attracts the male by making side-to-side motions with her head, and copulation may occur several times during an encounter. Unusually, females have been reported to reach menopause in the wild and may survive up to nine years after giving birth.

The female gives birth to a single young after a gestation period of 181 to 200 days. The young weigh about 400 g (14 oz), measure about 20 cm (7.9 in) and are well developed, with a strong grip for holding onto the mother. Silvery lutungs are born with orange fur and with white hairless skin on the face, hands, and feet. The skin rapidly changes to the dark adult colour, but the fur does not reach the adult pattern for three to five months after birth. The young are cared for by females communally and are not weaned for 18 months, even though the biological mother stops lactating after just 12 months. The young are sexually mature almost as soon as they finish weaning, and, on average, females first give birth at 35 months of age.

Silvery lutungs have lived up to 31 years in captivity.

=== Predators ===
Local predators able to feed on silvery lutungs include leopards, tigers, dholes, and some large snakes. Binturongs, and various other small carnivores are probably able to feed on infants.

=== Diseases ===
Silvery lutungs are unusually susceptible to human diseases, including AIDS, and have therefore been widely used in medical research.

== Conservation ==
The silvery lutung is classified as Vulnerable on the IUCN Red List and is listed in Appendix II of CITES. Its habitat is heavily threatened throughout its range by logging and the development of oil palm plantations. It is also threatened by hunting for meat and by capture for the pet trade.
