= Sawecolobus =

Sawecolobus Temporal range: Late Miocene

Scientific classification
- Kingdom: Animalia
- Phylum: Chordata
- Class: Mammalia
- Infraclass: Placentalia
- Order: Primates
- Family: Cercopithecidae
- Genus: †Sawecolobus; Gommery et al., 2022
- Species: †S. lukeinoensis

Binomial name
- †Sawecolobus lukeinoensis Gommery et al., 2022

Extinct species of mammal

Sawecolobus is an extinct genus of colobine primate that inhabited Kenya during the Late Miocene, containing the species Sawecolobus lukeinoensis.
