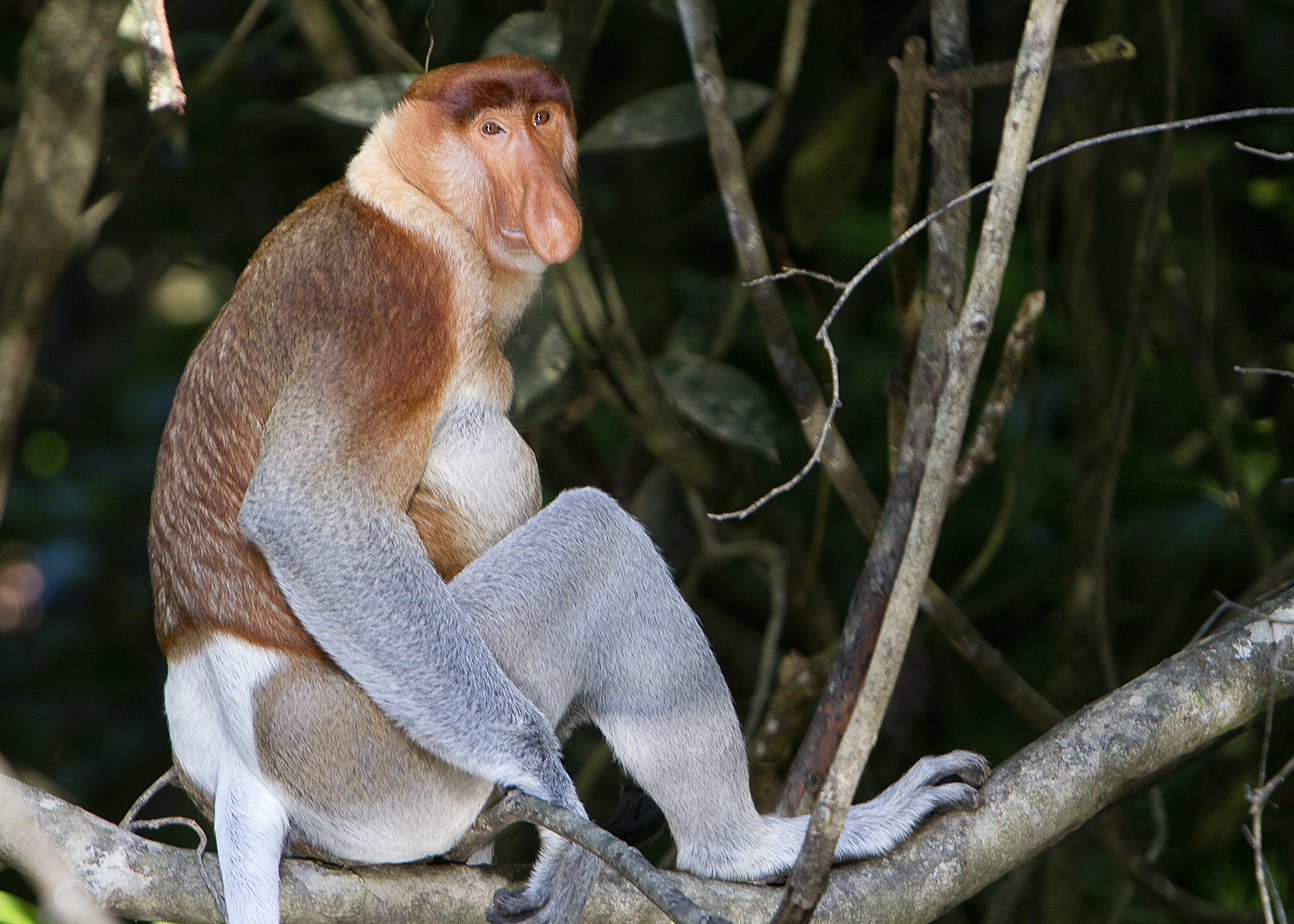

Conservation status
- Endangered (IUCN 3.1)
- CITES Appendix I

Scientific classification
- Kingdom: Animalia
- Phylum: Chordata
- Class: Mammalia
- Order: Primates
- Family: Cercopithecidae
- Subfamily: Colobinae
- Tribe: Presbytini
- Genus: Nasalis; É. Geoffroy, 1812
- Species: N. larvatus

Binomial name
- Nasalis larvatus Wurmb, 1787
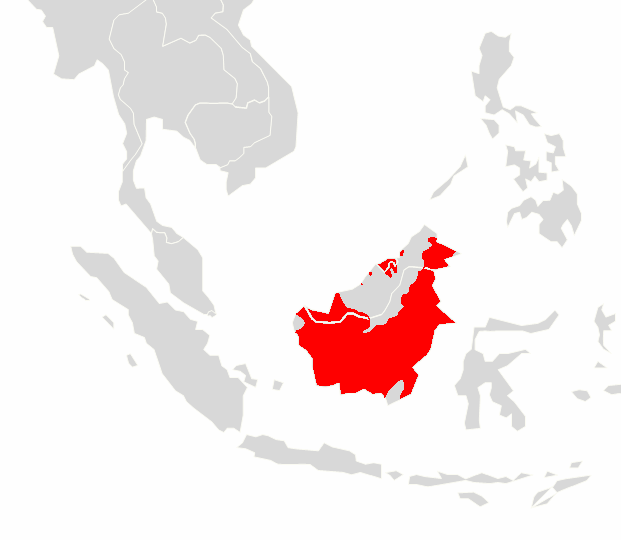

= Proboscis monkey =

Primate species

The proboscis monkey or long-nosed monkey (Nasalis larvatus) is an arboreal Old World monkey with an unusually large nose (or proboscis), a reddish-brown skin color and a long tail. It is endemic to the Southeast Asian island of Borneo and is found mostly in mangrove forests and on the coastal areas of the island.

This species co-exists with the Bornean orangutan and monkeys such as the silvery lutung. It belongs in the monotypic genus Nasalis.

== Taxonomy ==
The proboscis monkey belongs to the subfamily Colobinae of the Old World monkeys. The two subspecies are:

- N. l. larvatus (Wurmb, 1787), which occupies the whole range of the species excluding northeast Kalimantan
- N. l. orientalis (Chasen, 1940), restricted to north-east Kalimantan

However, the difference between the subspecies is small, and not all authorities recognise N. l. orientalis.

The genus name Nasalis comes from the Latin word nasus meaning "nose".

This animal was made known to Westerners by Baron Friedrich von Wurmb in 1781, he later sent specimens of it to Stamford Raffles in Europe.

== Description ==
The proboscis monkey is a large species, being one of the largest monkey species native to Asia. Only the Tibetan macaque and a few of the gray langurs can rival its size.

Sexual dimorphism is pronounced in the species. Males have a head-body length of 66 to 76.2 cm (26.0 to 30.0 in) and typically weigh 16 to 22.5 kg (35 to 50 lb), with a maximum known weight of 30 kg (66 lb). Females measure 53.3 to 62 cm (21.0 to 24.4 in) in head-and-body length and weigh 7 to 12 kg (15 to 26 lb), with a maximum known mass of 15 kg (33 lb). The male has a red penis with a black scrotum.

The proboscis monkey has a long coat; the fur on the back is bright orange, reddish brown, yellowish brown or brick-red. The underfur is light-grey, yellowish, or greyish to light-orange. Infants are born with a blue coloured face that at 2.5 months darkens to grey. By 8.5 months of age, the face has become cream coloured like the adults. Both sexes have bulging stomachs that give the monkeys what resembles a pot belly. Many of the monkeys' toes are webbed.

=== Nose ===
Further adding to the dimorphism is the large nose or proboscis of the male, which can exceed 10.2 cm (4.0 in) in length, and hangs lower than the mouth. Theories for the extensive length of their nose suggest it may be sexual selection by the females, who prefer louder vocalisations, with the size of the nose increasing the volume of the call.

The nose is smaller in the female and is upturned in the young. Nevertheless, the nose of the female is still fairly large for a primate. The skull of the proboscis monkey has specialized nasal cartilages that support the large nose.

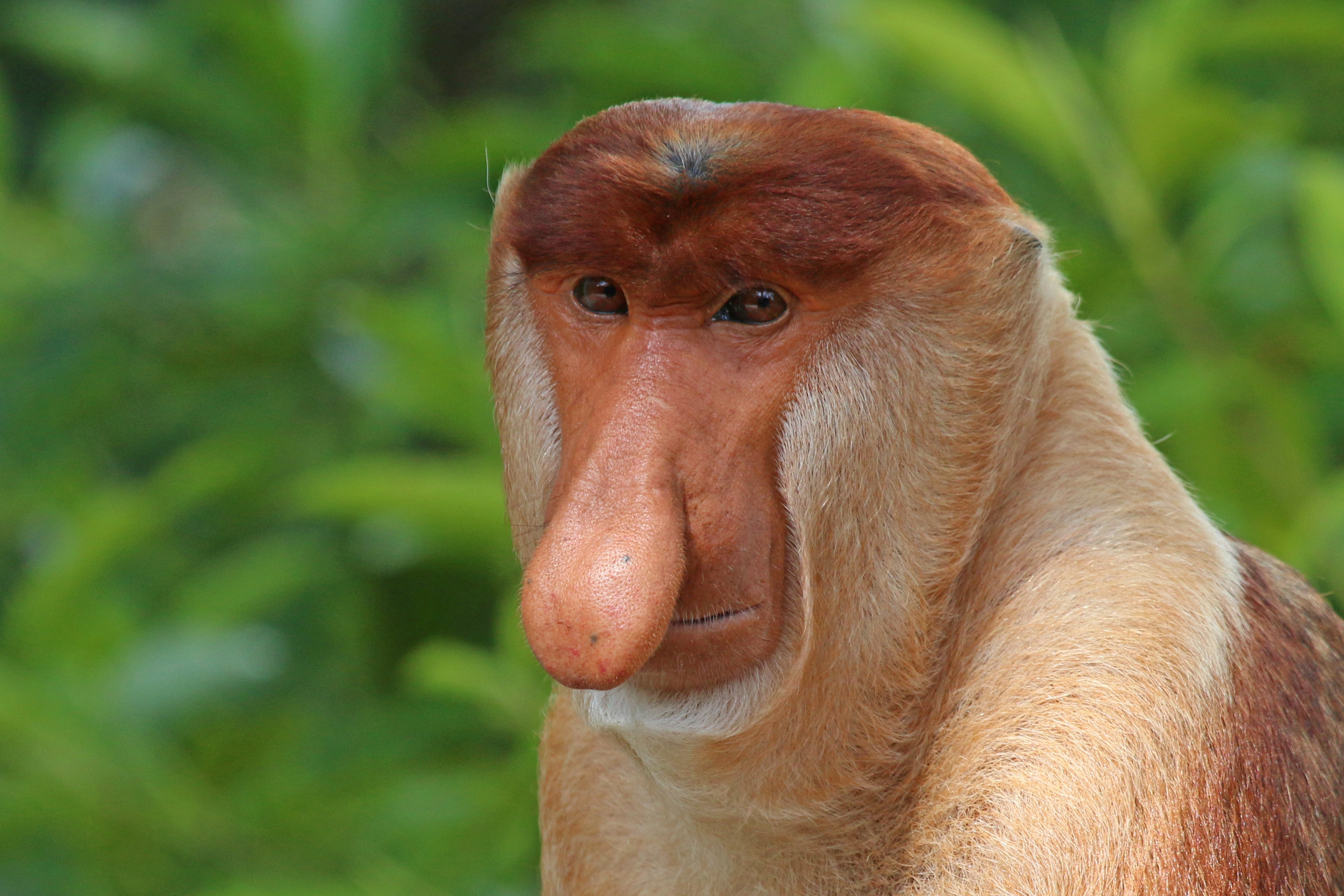
Male

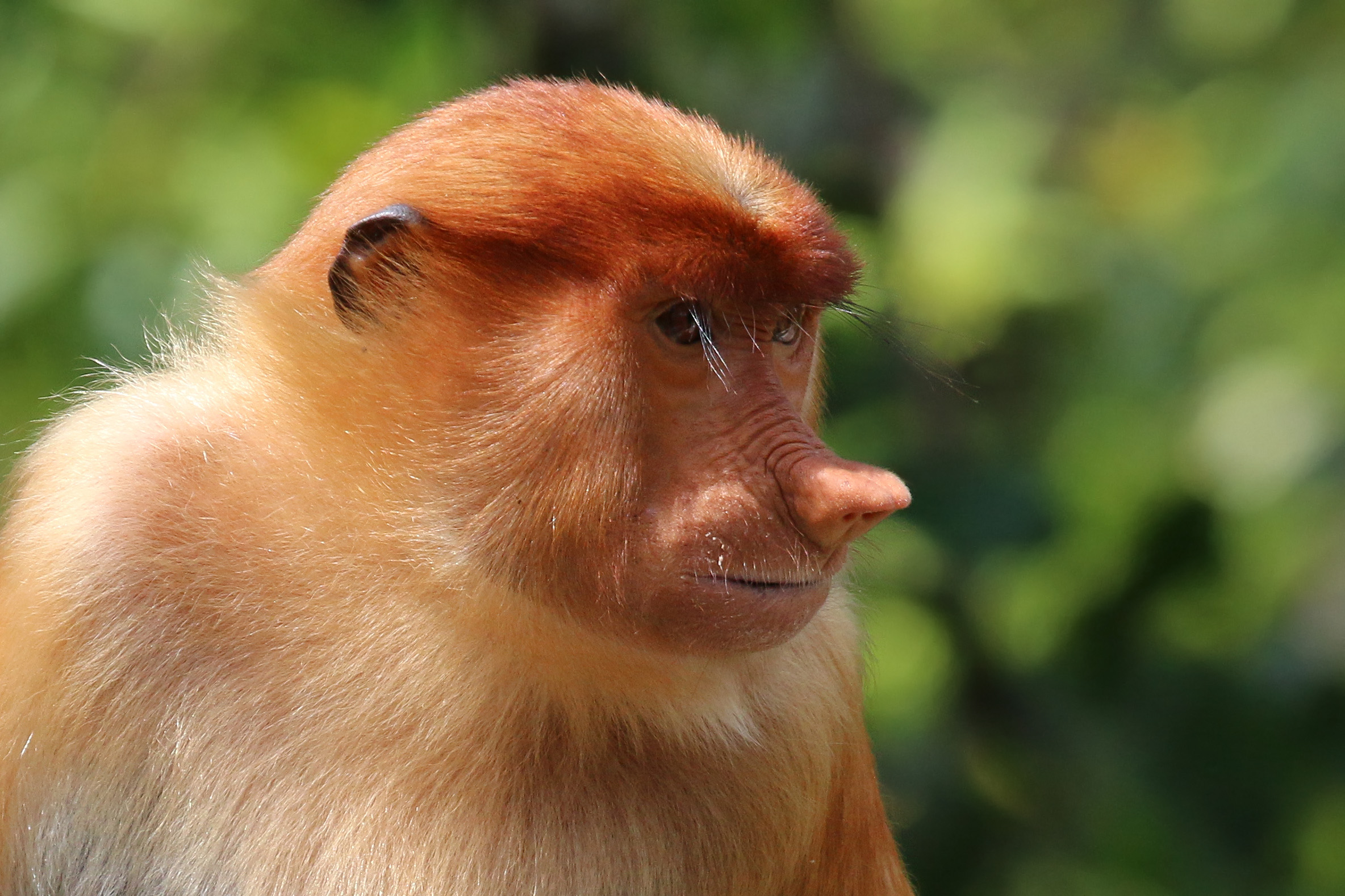
Female

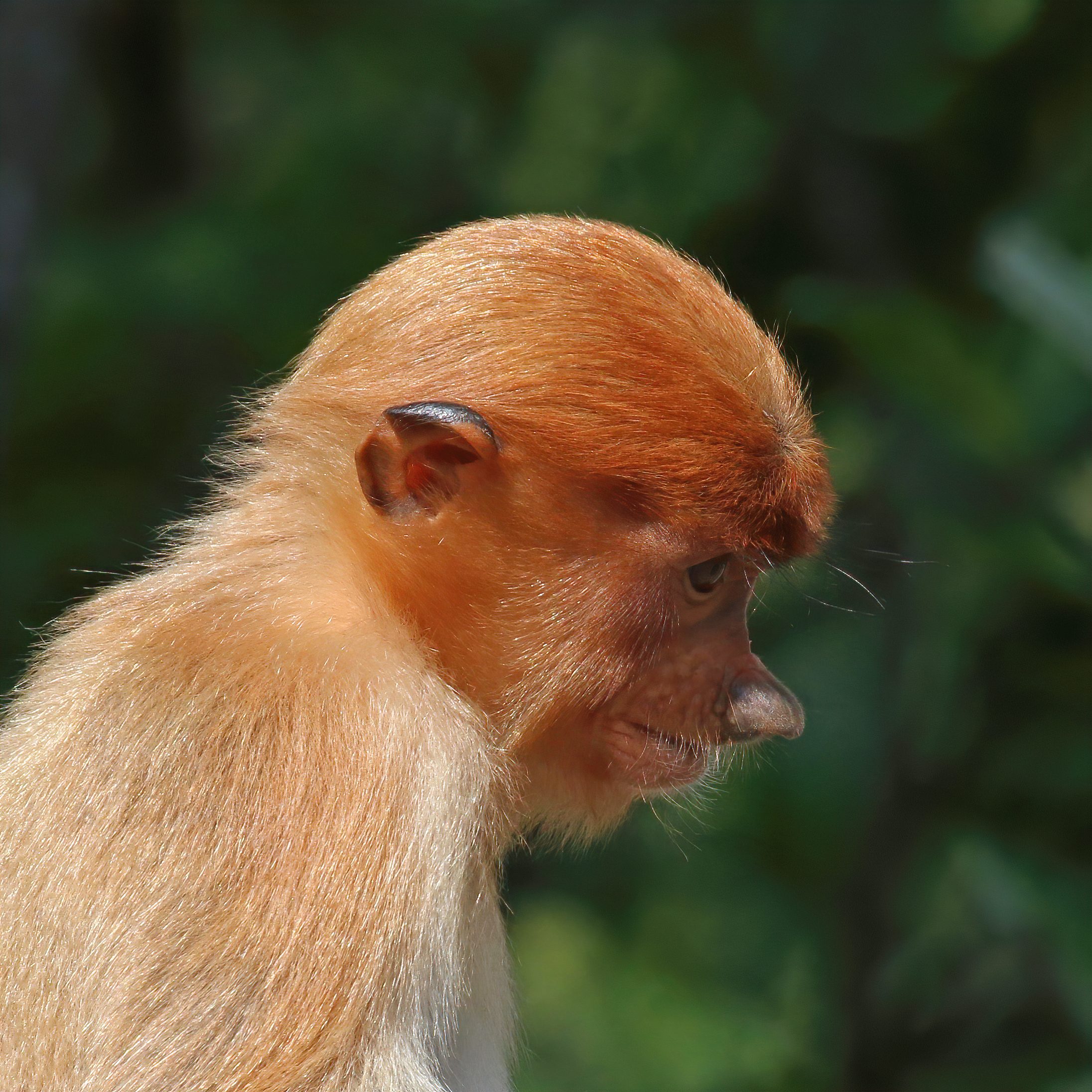
Juvenile

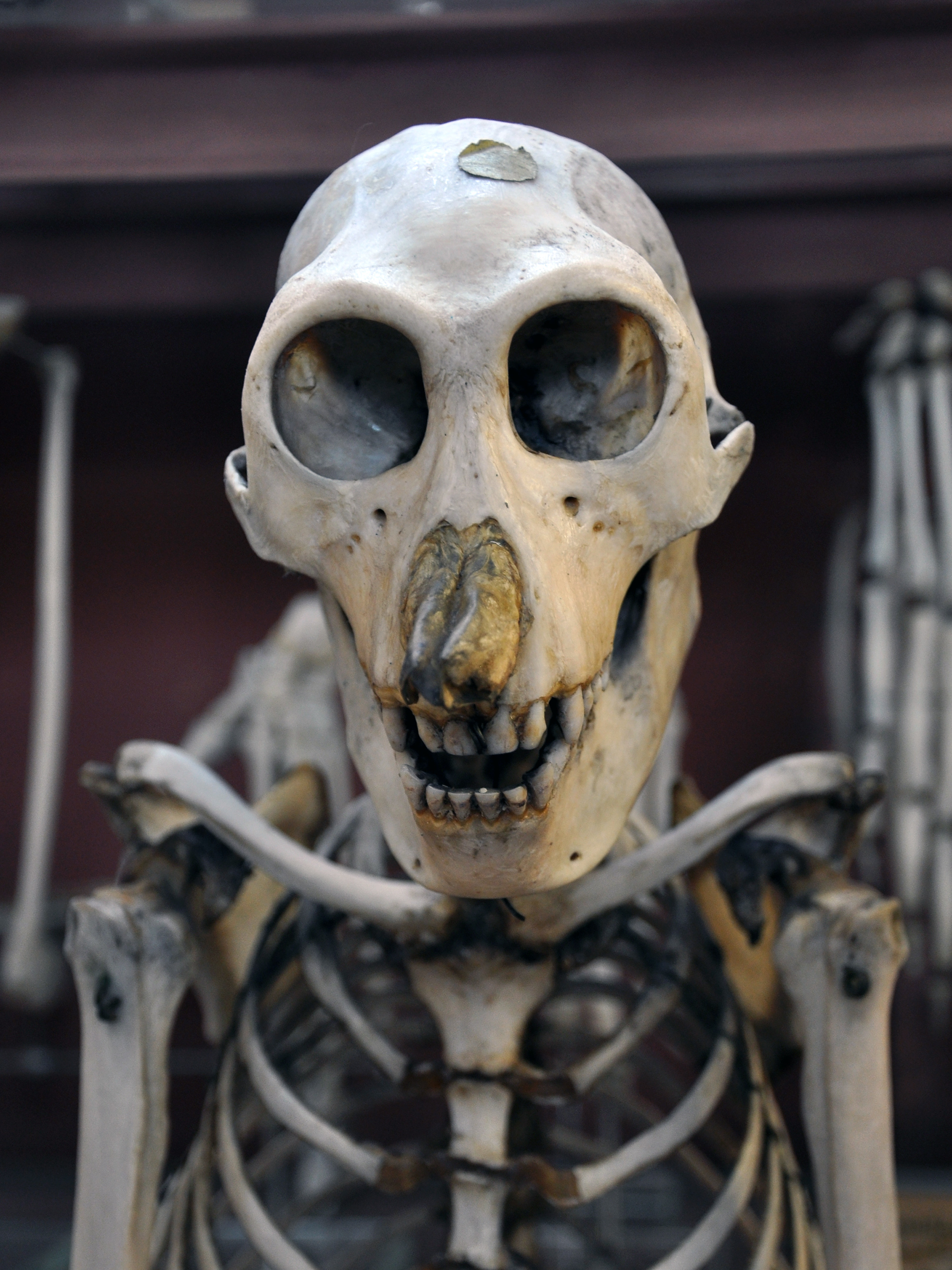
Nasal cartilages that were left intact in a specimen skull in order to show the structures that support the nose

== Distribution and habitat ==
The proboscis monkey is endemic to the island of Borneo and can be found in all three nations that divide the island: Brunei, Indonesia and Malaysia. It is most common in coastal areas and along rivers. This species is restricted to lowland habitats that may experience tides. It favors dipterocarp, mangrove and riverine forests. It can also be found in swamp forests, stunted swamp forests, rubber forests, rubber plantations, limestone hill forests, nypa swamps, nibong swamps, tall swamp forests, tropical heath forests and steep cliffs. This species usually stays within at least a kilometer from a water source. It is perhaps the most aquatic of the primates and is a fairly good swimmer, capable of swimming up to 20 m (66 ft) underwater. It is known to swim across rivers. Aside from this, the proboscis monkey is largely arboreal and moves quadrupedally and by leaps. It is known to jump off branches and descend into water.

== Behavior and ecology ==
=== Social behavior ===
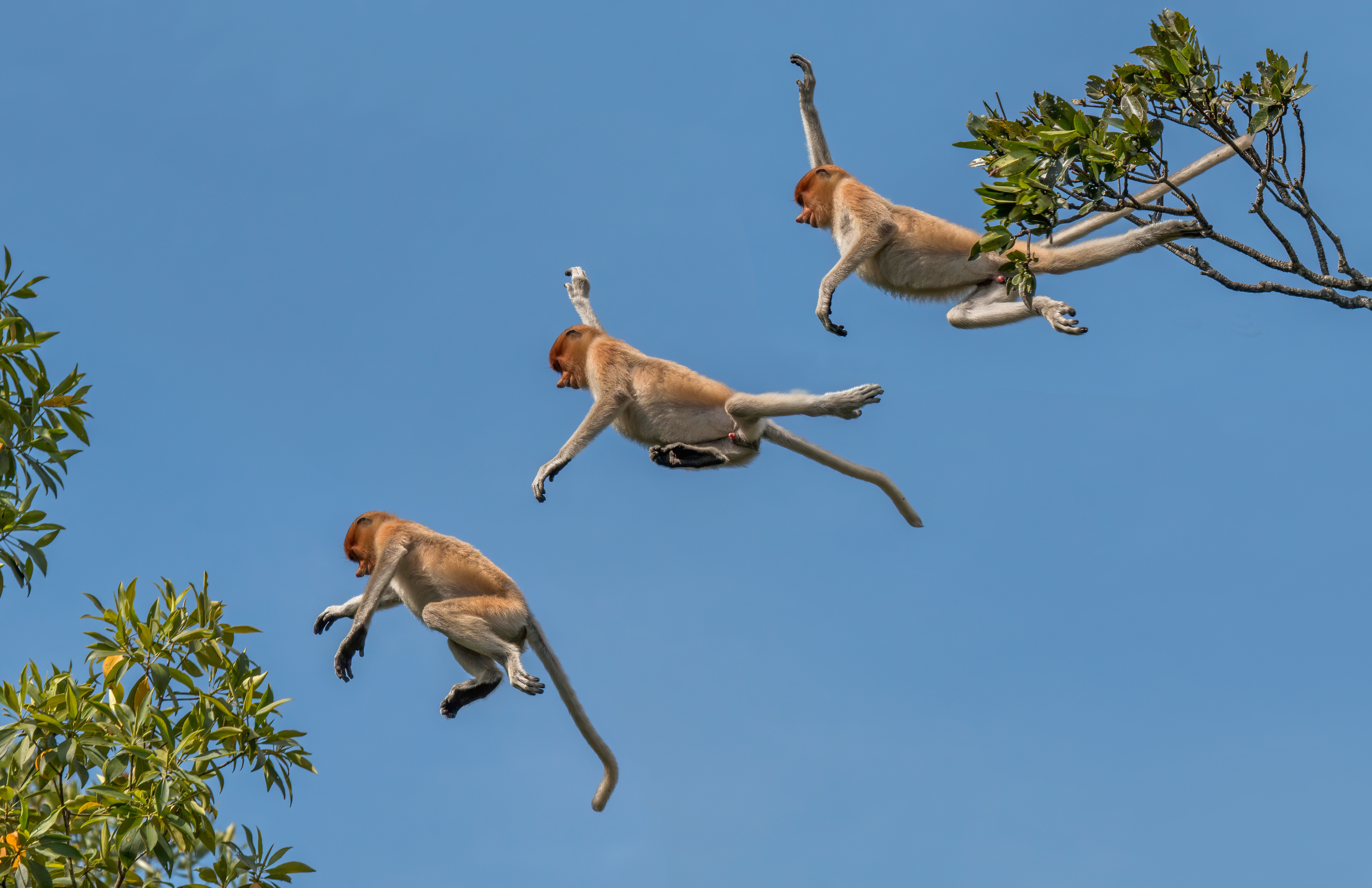
Jumping (composite image, from right to left), Labuk Bay, Sabah

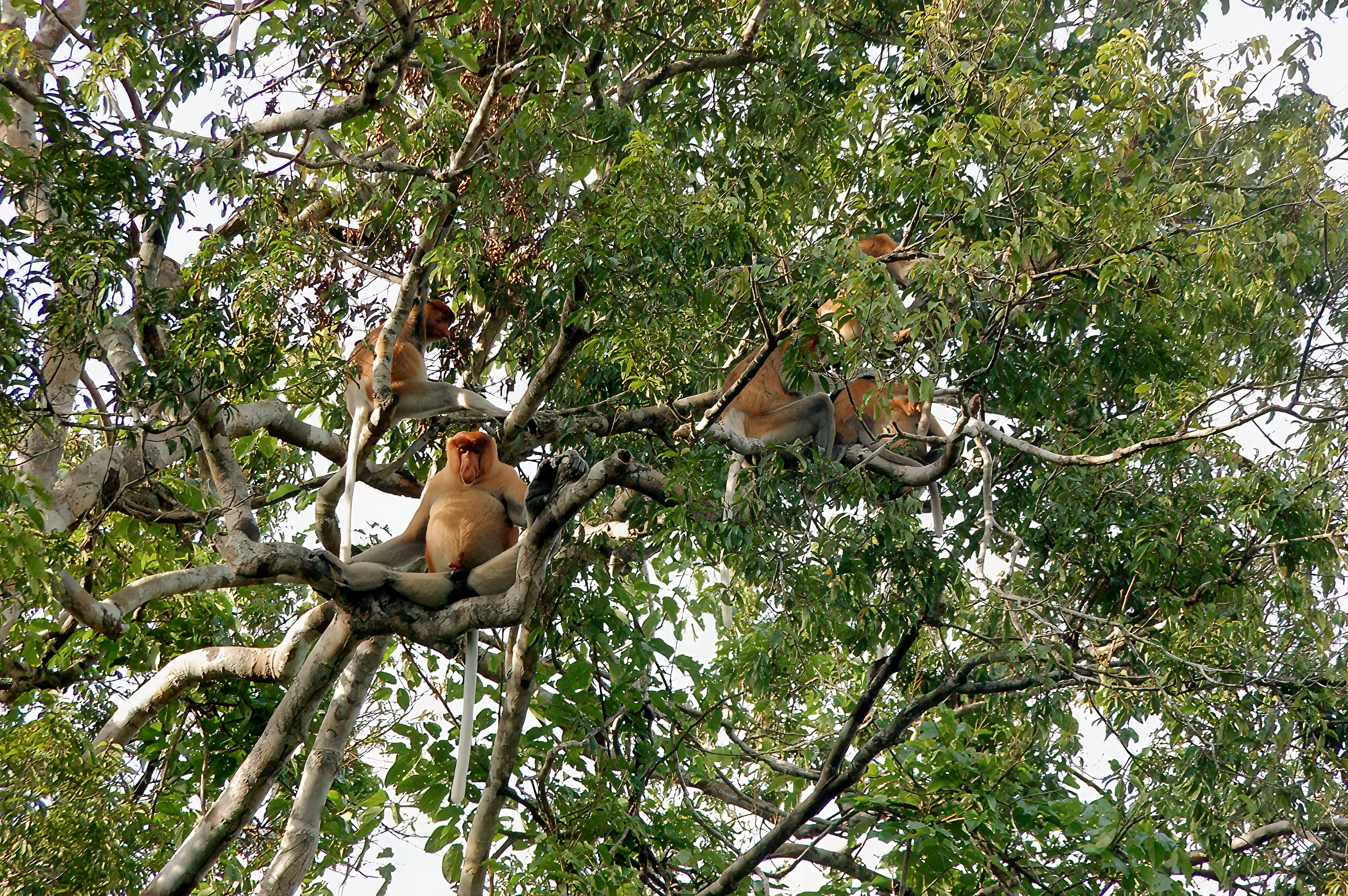
A group by the river Kinabatangan

Proboscis monkeys generally live in groups composed of one adult male, some adult females and their offspring. All-male groups may also exist. Some individuals are solitary, mostly males. Monkey groups live in overlapping home ranges, with little territoriality, in a fission-fusion society, with groups gathering at sleeping sites as night falls. There exist bands which arise when groups come together and slip apart yet sometimes groups may join to mate and groom. Groups gather during the day and travel together, but individuals only groom and play with those in their own group. One-male groups consist of 3 to 19 individuals, while bands can consist of as many as 60 individuals. Serious aggression is uncommon among the monkeys but minor aggression does occur. Overall, members of the same bands are fairly tolerant of each other. A linear dominance hierarchy exists between females. Males of one-male groups can stay in their groups for six to eight years. Replacements in the resident males appear to occur without serious aggression. Upon reaching adulthood, males leave their natal groups and join all-male groups. Females also sometimes leave their natal groups, perhaps to avoid infanticide or inbreeding, reduce competition for food, or elevation of their social status.

In Sabah, Malaysia, proboscis monkeys have been observed in mixed-species groups with silvery lutungs, and interspecific mating and a possible hybrid has been observed. Researchers believe this may be a result of the two species being confined to a small patch of riverine forest due to deforestation in order to plant oil palm trees.

=== Reproduction ===
Females become sexually mature at the age of five years. They experience sexual swelling, which involves the genitals becoming pink or reddened. At one site, matings largely take place between February and November, while births occur between March and May. Copulations tend to last for half a minute. The male will grab the female by the ankles or torso and mount her from behind. Both sexes will encourage mating, but they are not always successful. When soliciting, both sexes will make pouted faces. In addition, males will sometimes vocalize and females will present their backsides and shake their head from side to side. Mating pairs are sometimes harassed by subadults. Proboscis monkeys may also engage in mounting with no reproductive purpose, such as playful and same-sex mounting, and females will attempt to initiate copulation even after they have conceived. Gestation usually last 166–200 days or slightly more. Females tend to give birth at night or in the early morning. The mothers then eat the placenta and lick their infants clean. The young begin to eat solid foods at six weeks and are weaned at seven months old. The nose of a young male grows slowly until reaching adulthood. The mother will allow other members of her group to hold her infant. When a resident male in a one-male group is replaced, the infants are at risk of infanticide.

=== Communication ===
Proboscis monkeys are known to make various vocalizations. When communicating the status of group, males will emit honks. They have a special honk emitted towards infants, which is also used for reassurance. Males will also produce alarm calls to signal danger. Both sexes give threat calls, but each are different. In addition, females and immature individuals will emit so-called "female calls" when angry. Honks, roars and snarls are made during low-intensity agonistic encounters. Nonvocal displays include leaping-branch shaking, bare-teeth open mouth threats and erection in males, made in the same situations.

=== Feeding and activities ===
As a seasonal folivore and frugivore, the proboscis monkey eats primarily fruit and leaves. It also eats flowers, seeds and insects to a lesser extent. At least 55 different plant species are consumed, "with a marked preference for Eugenia sp., Ganua motleyana and Lophopetalum javanicum". Young leaves are preferred over mature leaves and unripe fruits are preferred over ripe fruit. Being a seasonal eater, the proboscis monkey eats mostly fruit from January to May and mostly leaves from June to December. Groups usually sleep in adjacent trees. Monkeys tend to sleep near rivers, if they are nearby. Proboscis monkeys will start the day foraging and then rest further inland. Their daily activities consist of resting, traveling, feeding and keeping vigilant. Occasionally, they chew their cud to allow more efficient digestion and food intake. As night approaches, the monkeys move back near the river and forage again. Predators of the proboscis monkey include false gharials and possibly reticulated pythons, sun bears, saltwater crocodiles, changeable hawk-eagles, crested serpent eagles, and Sunda clouded leopards. Monkeys will cross rivers at narrows or cross arboreally if possible. This may serve as predator avoidance.

== Conservation status ==
The proboscis monkey is assessed as endangered in the IUCN Red List of Threatened Species and listed in Appendix I of CITES. Its total population has decreased by more than 50% in the past 36–40 years to 2008 due to ongoing habitat loss because of logging and oil palm plantations, and hunting in some areas due to the species being treated as a delicacy, as well as its use in traditional Chinese medicine. The population is fragmented: the largest remaining populations are found in Kalimantan; there are far fewer in Sarawak, Brunei and Sabah. The proboscis monkey is protected by law in all regions of Borneo. In Malaysia, it is protected by a number of laws including the Wildlife Protection Act (federal law), the Wildlife Protection Ordinance 1998 (Chapter 26) and Wildlife Conservation Enactment 1997 (Sabah state law).

The proboscis monkey can be found in 16 protected areas: Danau Sentarum National Park, Gunung Palung National Park, Kendawangan Nature Reserve, Kutai National Park, Lesan Protection Forest, Muara Kaman Nature Reserve, Mandor Reserve and Tanjung Puting National Park in Indonesia; Bako National Park, Gunung Pueh Forest Reserve, Kabili-Sepilok Forest Reserve, Klias National Park, Kulamba Wildlife Reserve, Lower Kinabatangan Wildlife Sanctuary, Sungei Samunsam Wildlife Sanctuary and Ulu Segama Reserve in Malaysia.

In the Lower Kinabatangan Wildlife Sanctuary, a "mystery" hybrid monkey has been proposed to be a cross between the proboscis monkey and the silvery lutung (Trachypithecus cristatus). If this genetically confirmed, this individual's existence would indicate that the proboscis monkey is capable of hybridizing with a species it is estimated to have split with taxonomically roughly 9 million years ago, which might be a concern for conservation.
