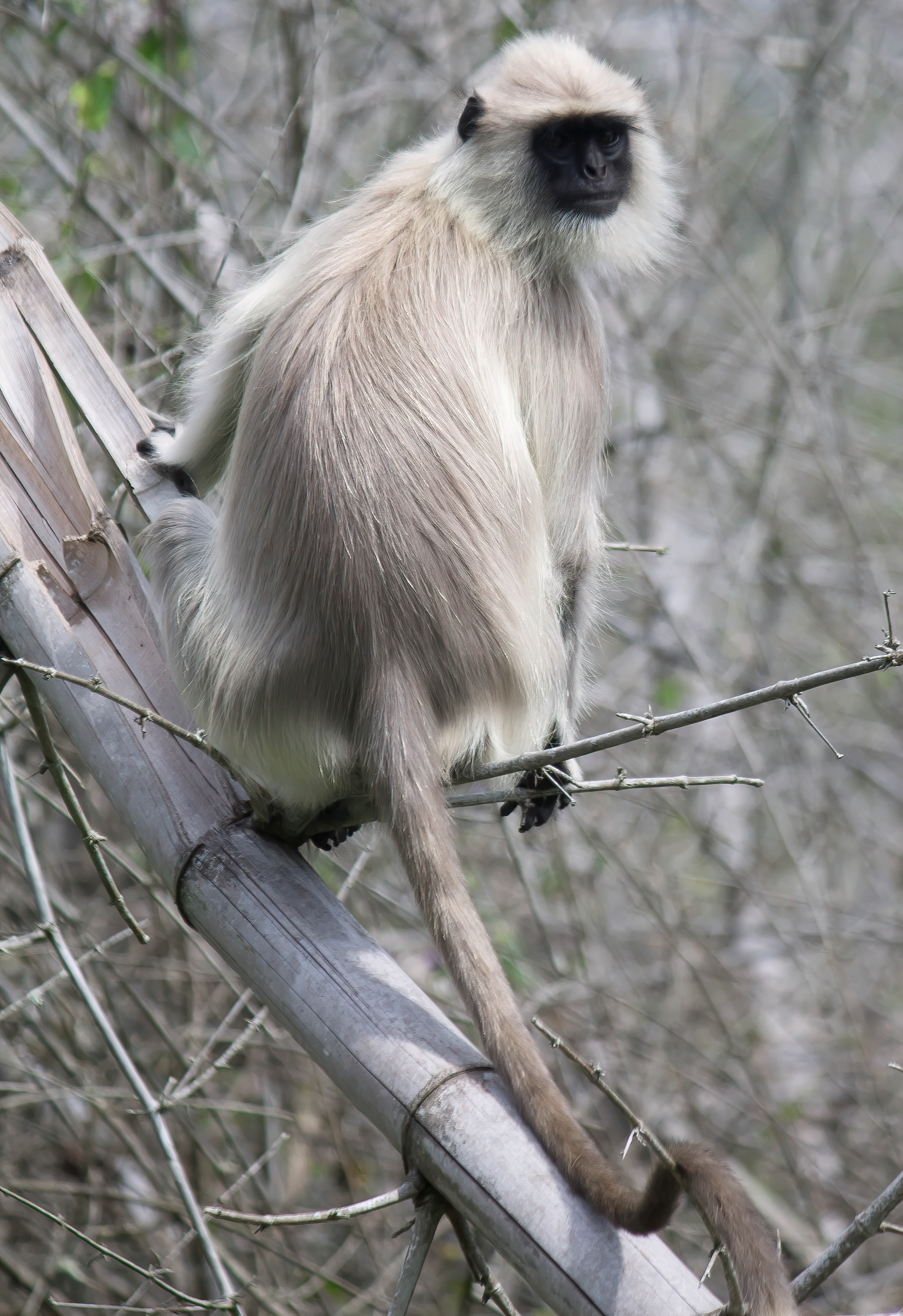
- Gray langur in Mudumalai, Tamil Nadu, India

Scientific classification
- Kingdom: Animalia
- Phylum: Chordata
- Class: Mammalia
- Infraclass: Placentalia
- Order: Primates
- Family: Cercopithecidae
- Subfamily: Colobinae; Jerdon, 1867

Type genus
- Colobus Illiger, 1811

Genera
- Colobini; Colobus; Piliocolobus; Procolobus; Presbytini; Nasalis; Presbytis; Pygathrix; Rhinopithecus; Semnopithecus; Simias; Trachypithecus; †Cercopithecoides; †Dolichopithecus; †Lemucolobus; †Mesopithecus; †Microcolobus; †Olotimcolobus; †Paracolobus; †Parapresbytis; †Rhinocolobus; †Sawecolobus

= Colobinae =

Colobine monkeys Temporal range: Late Miocene-recent 12.5–0 Ma

Subfamily of Old World monkeys

The Colobinae or leaf-eating monkeys are a subfamily of the Old World monkey family that includes 61 species in 11 genera, including the black-and-white colobus, the large-nosed proboscis monkey, and the gray langurs. Some classifications split the colobine monkeys into two tribes, while others split them into three groups. Both classifications put the three African genera Colobus, Piliocolobus, and Procolobus in one group; these genera are distinct in that they have stub thumbs, hence their family name, which comes from Ancient Greek κολοβός (kolobós), meaning "docked". The various Asian genera are placed into another one or two groups. Analysis of mtDNA confirms the Asian species form two distinct groups, one of langurs and the other of the "odd-nosed" species, but are inconsistent as to the relationships of the gray langurs; some studies suggest that the gray langurs are not closely related to either of these groups, while others place them firmly within the langur group.

== Classification and evolution ==
Colobinae is split into two tribes: Colobini, in Africa, and Presbytini in Asia. Based on fossil records, the tribes split between 13 to 10 million years ago. The Colobini tribe contains three genera, black-and-white colobuses, red colobuses, and the olive colobus, all of whom are native to Africa. The Asian Presbytini comprises seven genera split into two clades, the odd-nosed group and the langur group. The discordant gene tree topologies and divergence age estimates suggest that hybridization, particularly involving female introgression from Piliocolobus/Procolobus into Colobus and male introgression from Semnopithecus into Trachypithecus, played a prominent role in shaping the phylogenetic relationships of African and Asian colobine monkeys during their evolutionary history.

The earliest remains of Colobinae are known from the Tugen Hills of Kenya, dating to 12.5 million years ago. The earliest fossils of the genus in Eurasia are those of Mesopithecus found in Greece, dating to around 8.2 million years ago.

- Family Cercopithecidae
  - Subfamily Cercopithecinae
  - Subfamily Colobinae
  - Genus †Mesopithecus
  - Genus †Lemucolobus
  - Genus †Olotimcolobus
  - Genus †Sawecolobus
    - Tribe Colobini
      - Genus Colobus - black-and-white colobus monkeys
      - Genus Piliocolobus - red colobus monkeys
      - Genus Procolobus - olive colobus
      - †Genus Cercopithecoides
    - Tribe Presbytini
      - Langur (leaf monkey) group
        - Genus Trachypithecus - lutungs
        - Genus Presbytis - surilis
        - Genus Semnopithecus - gray langurs
      - Odd-nosed group
        - Genus Pygathrix - doucs
        - Genus Rhinopithecus - snub-nosed monkeys
        - Genus Nasalis - proboscis monkey
        - Genus Simias - pig-tailed langur

== Behaviour and ecology ==
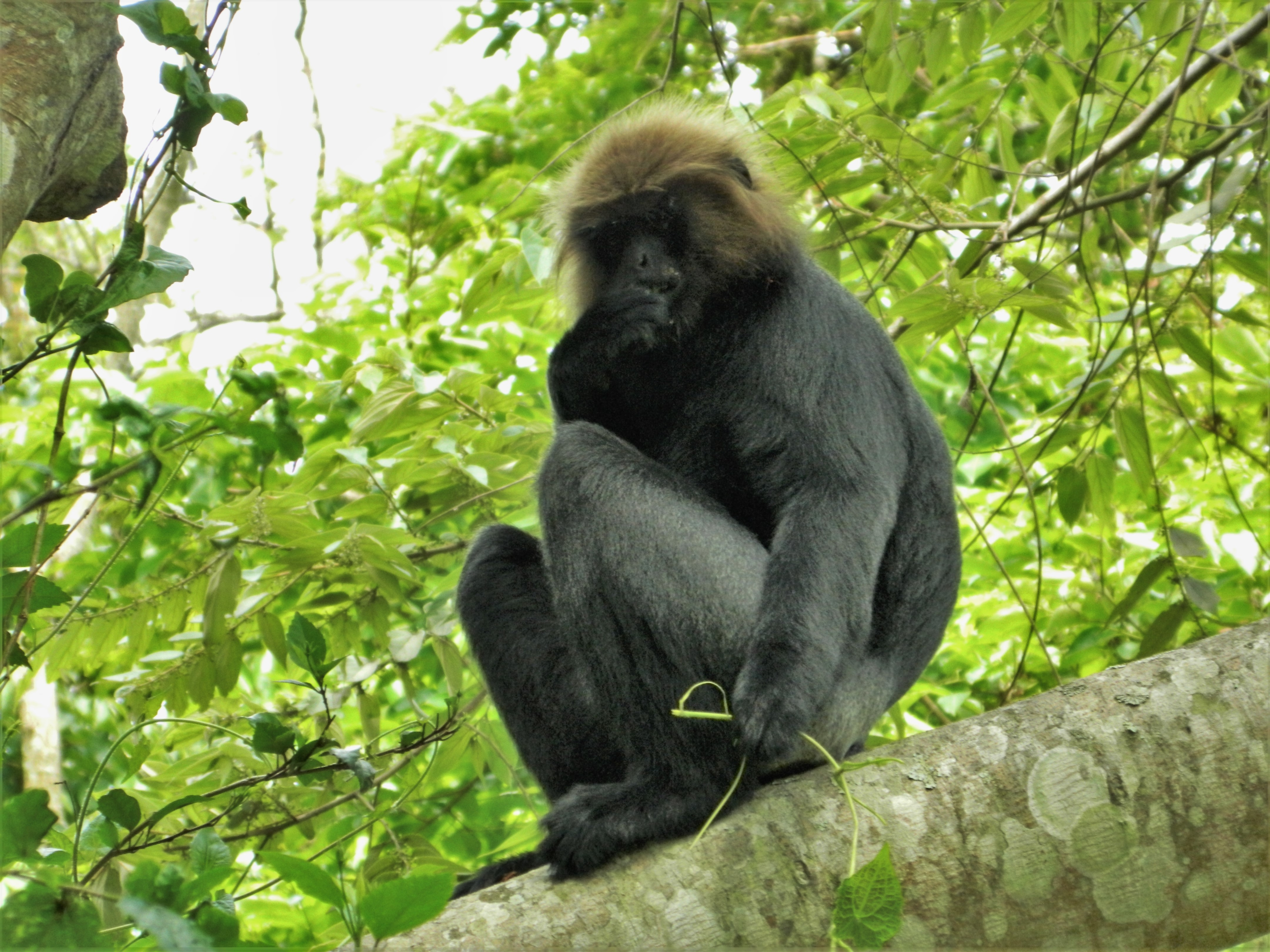
Adult Nilgiri langur in Periyar National Park

Most colobine species are arboreal, although some live a more terrestrial life. They are found in many different habitats of different climate zones (rainforests, mangroves, mountain forests, and savannah), but not in deserts and other dry areas. They live in groups, but in social forms vary.

Colobines are folivorous, though their diet may be supplemented with flowers, fruits and the occasional insect. To aid in digestion, particularly of hard-to-digest leaves, they have multichambered, complex stomachs, making them the only primates with foregut fermentation. Foregut fermenters use bacteria to detoxify plant compounds before reaching the intestine, where toxins can be absorbed. Foregut fermentation is also associated with higher protein extraction and efficient digestion of fiber; it is the dominant form of digestions in diverse herbivore taxa, including most Artiodactyla (e.g., deer, cattle, antelope), sloths, and kangaroos. In contrast, lower diversity howler monkeys in the New World rely on hindgut fermentation – occurring lower in the colon or cecum – much like horses and elephants. Unlike the other subfamily of Old World monkeys, the Cercopithecinae, they do not possess cheek pouches.

Silvery lutung (Trachypithecus cristatus) and the Northern plains gray langur (Semnopithecus entellus) females begin reproducing after around 3 years of age.

=== Hybrids ===
Intergeneric hybrids are known to occur within the subfamily Colobinae. In India, gray langurs (Semnopithecus spp.) are known to hybridize with Nilgiri langurs (Trachypithecus johnii).
