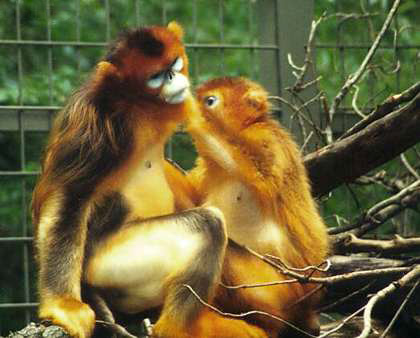
- Golden snub-nosed monkey (Rhinopithecus roxellana)

Scientific classification
- Kingdom: Animalia
- Phylum: Chordata
- Class: Mammalia
- Order: Primates
- Family: Cercopithecidae
- Tribe: Presbytini
- Genus: Rhinopithecus; A. Milne-Edwards, 1872

Type species
- Semnopithecus roxellana A. Milne-Edwards, 1872

Species
- See text

= Snub-nosed monkey =

Snub-nosed monkeys

Genus of mammals

Snub-nosed monkeys are a group of Old World monkeys and make up the entirety of the genus Rhinopithecus. The genus is rare and not fully researched. Some taxonomists group snub-nosed monkeys together with the genus Pygathrix.

== Distribution and habitat ==
Snub-nosed monkeys live in Asia, with a range covering southern China (especially Tibet, Sichuan, Yunnan, and Guizhou) extending into the northern parts of Myanmar and Vietnam. Snub-nosed monkeys inhabit mountain forests up to elevations of more than 4,000 m (13,000 ft). In the winter, they move into the deeply secluded regions. Higher elevation areas are more remote and difficult for humans to access and utilize and other studies have found less deforestation, more reforestation and afforestation, less range contraction, and less extinction in topographically steep areas. All Rhinopithecus species inhabit primary forest and grid cells with tree cover ≥ 75% might constitute important potential habitat.

== Description ==
These monkeys are named for the short stump of a nose on their round faces, with nostrils arranged forward. They have relatively multicolored and long fur, particularly at the shoulders and backs. They grow to a length of 51–83 cm (20–33 in) with a tail of 55–97 cm (22–38 in).

== Behavior ==
Snub-nosed monkeys spend the majority of their life in the trees. They live together in very large groups, splitting up into smaller groups in times of food-scarcity, such as in the winter. Family units consisting of one male with multiple females, along with all-male bachelor groups, form cohesive larger groups of roughly 76 to 400. They have territorial instincts, defending their zones mostly with shouts. They have a large vocal repertoire, calling sometimes solo while at other times together in choir-like fashion.

The monkeys are known to be difficult to track because they are so quiet. Researchers have noted that it's easier to find them when it's raining because water gets into their nostrils and makes them sneeze.

== Diet ==
The diet of these animals consists mainly of tree needles, bamboo buds, fruits and leaves. A multi-chambered stomach helps them with digesting their food.

== Breeding ==
The impulse for mating starts with the female. She takes up eye contact with the male and runs away a short bit, then flashes her genitals. If the male shows interest (he does not always), he joins the female and they mate. The 200-day gestation period ends with a single birth in late spring or early summer. Young animals become fully mature in about six to seven years. Zoologists know little about their lifespan.

== Conservation ==
The golden and black-and-white snub-nosed monkeys are both endangered species, while the other three species are critically endangered.

Golden snub-nosed monkey communities with large populations have high genetic diversity, but also show higher levels of recent inbreeding than other snub-nosed monkeys.

== Species ==
Genus Rhinopithecus – A. Milne-Edwards, 1872 – five species
Common name	Scientific name and subspecies	Range	Size and ecology	IUCN status and estimated population
Black-and-white snub-nosed monkey	R. bieti A. Milne-Edwards, 1897	Southern China	Size: 74–83 cm (29–33 in) long, plus 51–72 cm (20–28 in) tail Habitat: Forest Diet: Leaves, fruit, and lichen	EN 1,000
Golden snub-nosed monkey	R. roxellana (A. Milne-Edwards, 1870) Three subspecies: R. r. hubeiensis (Hubei golden snub-nosed monkey); R. r. qinlingensis (Qinling golden snub-nosed monkey); R. r. roxellana (Moupin golden snub-nosed monkey)	Central China	Size: 57–76 cm (22–30 in) long, plus 51–72 cm (20–28 in) tail Habitat: Forest Diet: Leaves, bark, and lichen, as well as buds and fruit seeds	EN Unknown
Gray snub-nosed monkey	R. brelichi Thomas, 1903	Central China	Size: About 64–73 cm (25–29 in) long, plus 70–97 cm (28–38 in) tail Habitat: Forest Diet: Leaves, buds, fruit, seeds and bark, as well as insect larvae	CR 200
Myanmar snub-nosed monkey	R. strykeri Geissmann et al., 2010	Northern Myanmar	Size: About 56 cm (22 in) long, plus 78 cm (31 in) tail Habitat: Forest Diet: Leaves, fruit, seeds, buds, flowers, twigs, and bark	CR 350–400
Tonkin snub-nosed monkey	R. avunculus Dollman, 1912	Northern Vietnam	Size: 51–65 cm (20–26 in) long, plus 66–92 cm (26–36 in) tail Habitat: Forest Diet: Leaves, fruit, flowers, and seeds	CR 80–100

== Documentary films ==
- Mystery Monkeys of Shangri-La, PBS "Nature", April 29, 2015
- Born In China

== See also ==
- Wildlife of China
