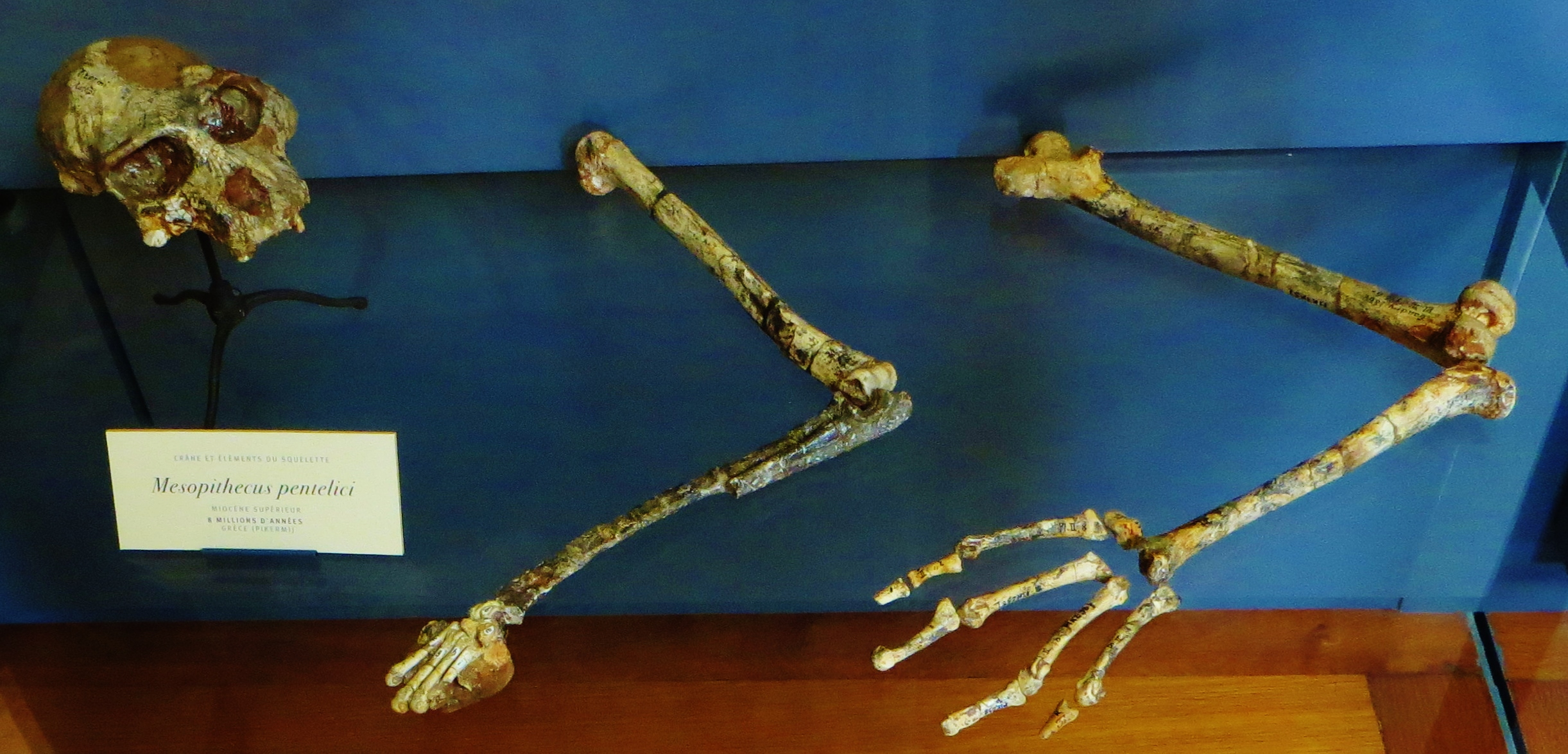
- Skeleton
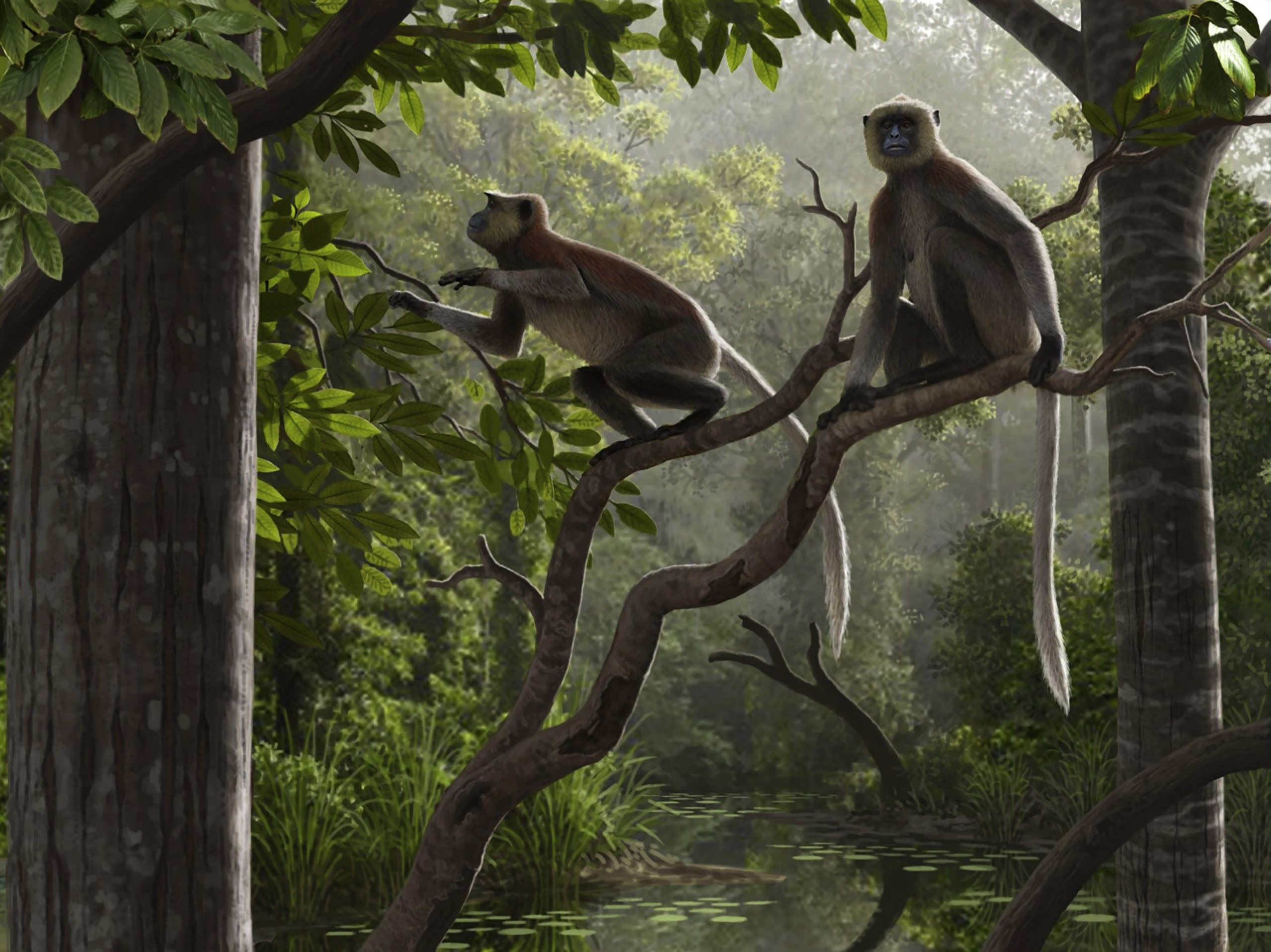
- Life restoration of Mesopithecus pentelicus from Zhaotong, China by Mauricio Antón

Scientific classification
- Kingdom: Animalia
- Phylum: Chordata
- Class: Mammalia
- Order: Primates
- Family: Cercopithecidae
- Subfamily: Colobinae
- Genus: †Mesopithecus; Wagner, 1839

Species
- Mesopithecus monspessulanus Gervais 1859; Mesopithecus pentelicus Wagner 1839 (type)

= Mesopithecus =

Mesopithecus Temporal range: Late Miocene to Late Pliocene 8.2–2.6 Ma

Extinct genus of monkeys

Mesopithecus ("middle monkey" for being between Hylobates and Semnopithecus in build) is an extinct genus of Old World monkey belonging to the subfamily Colobinae that lived in Eurasia during the Late Miocene and Pliocene epochs, around 8.2-2.6 million years ago.

== Description ==
Mesopithecus had a body length of about 40 centimetres (16 in), possessing a slender body with long, muscular limbs and flexible fingers.

== Taxonomy ==
The relationship of Mesopithecus to living members of Colobinae is uncertain, some have interpreted it as an early offshoot outside the split between Asian and African colobines, while others have interpreted it as a close relative of the Asian doucs (Pygathrix).

== Distribution and palaeobiology ==
Fossils of Mesopithecus span across Eurasia, from Great Britain (Red Crag) and the Iberian Peninsula in the west to the Indian Subcontinent and China.

Analysis of its anatomy suggests that members of the genus were semiterrestrial, spending a considerable amount of the time on the ground, though some authors have argued that some species were likely arboreal. Species of Mesopithecus were likely capable climbers and probably occasionally engaged in leaping.

Dental microwear analysis shows that Mesopithecus had a preference for feeding on hard seeds, but the microwear of M. pentelici also indicates a mixed diet that did involve folivory to some extent; perhaps leaves were a fallback food for the colobine during times when its preferred food items were scarce. Morphometric analysis of a M. pentelici mandible from Shuitangba in Yunnan, China confirm that it was best adapted for eating hard seeds, though its more developed condyle length and moment arms of the temporomandibular joint and medial pterygoid muscles suggest this population of M. pentelici exhibited a greater degree of folivory than others.

== Gallery ==
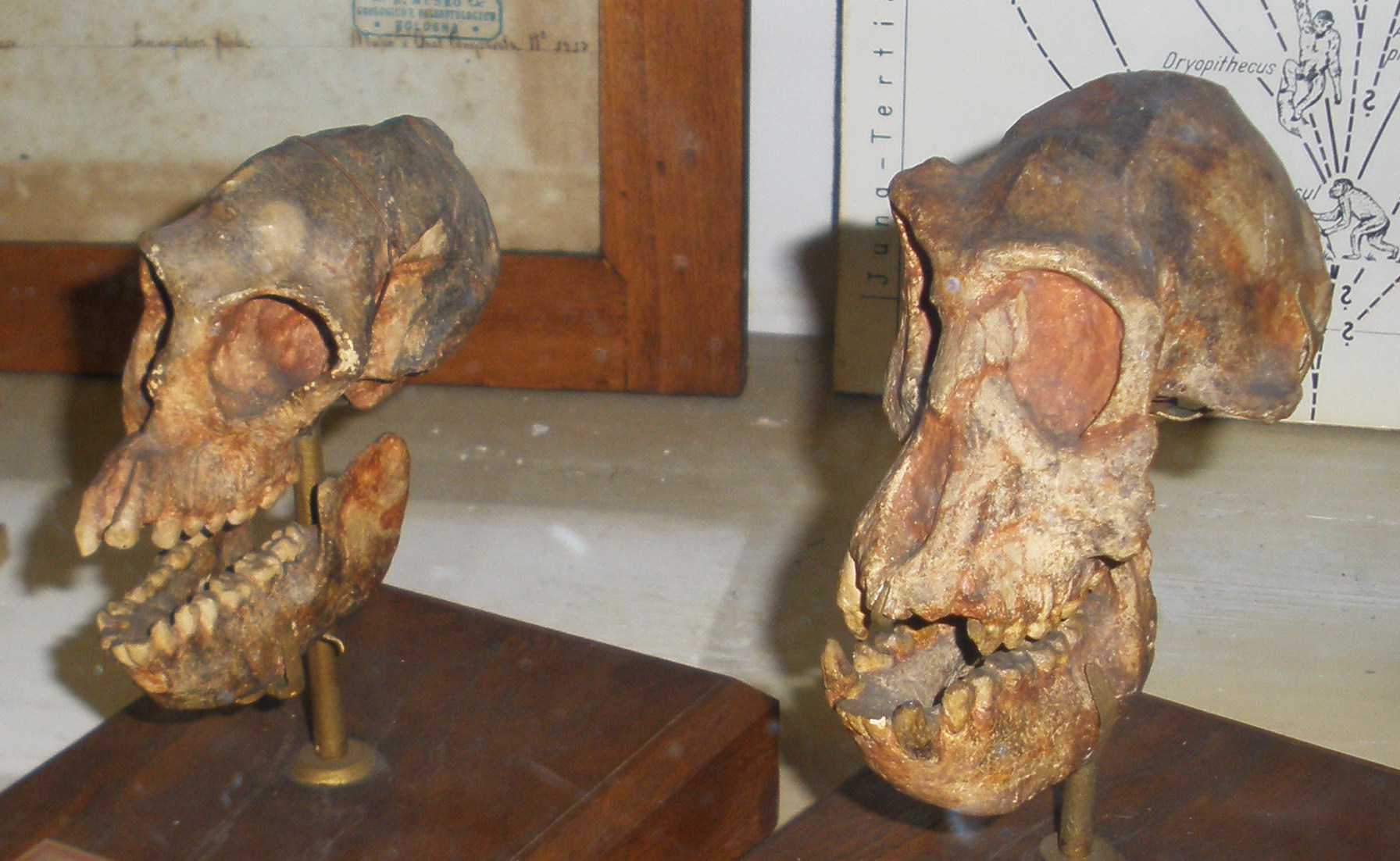
Mesopithecus pentelici skulls

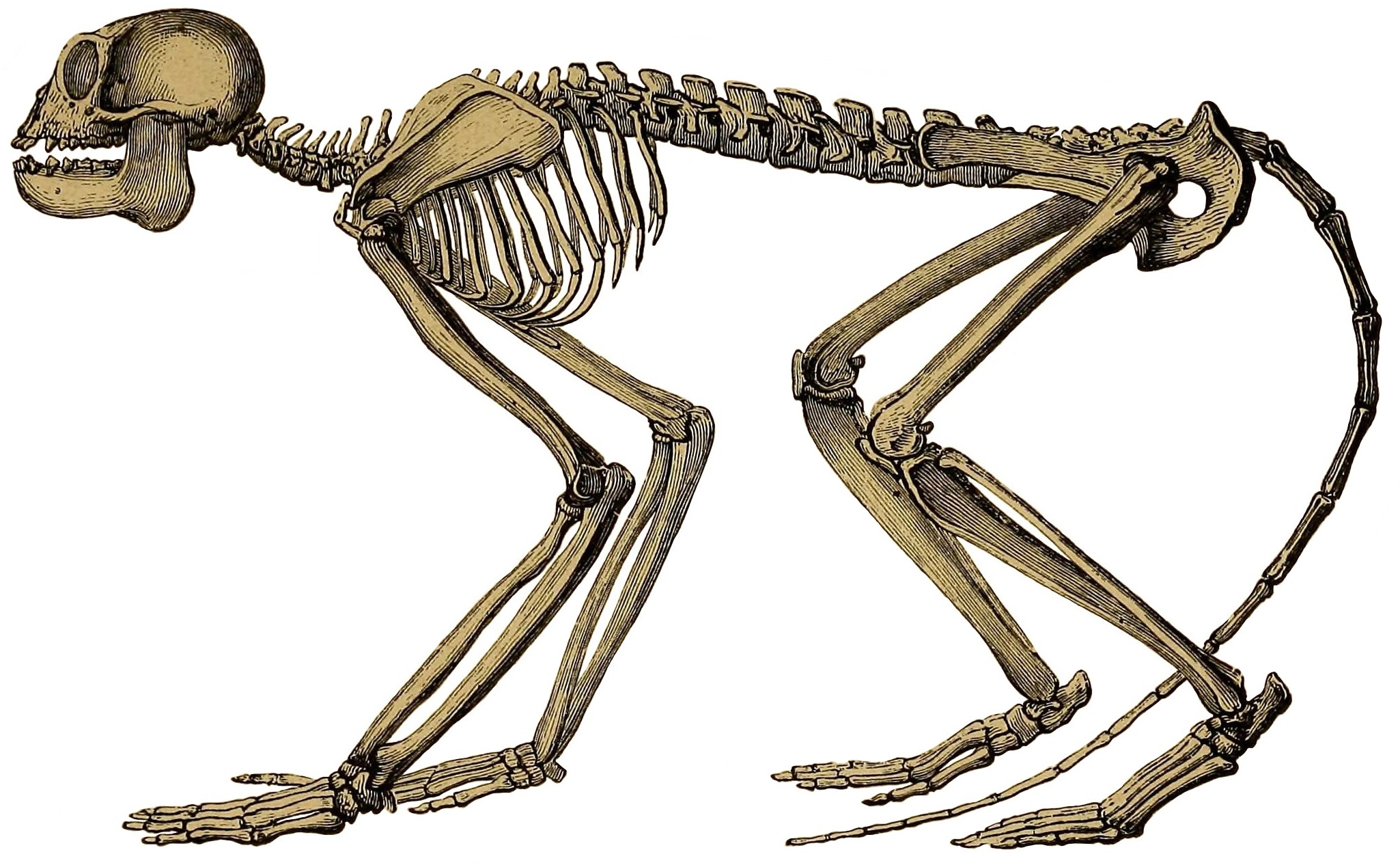
Skeletal restoration
