= The World's 25 Most Endangered Primates =

List of highly-endangered primate species

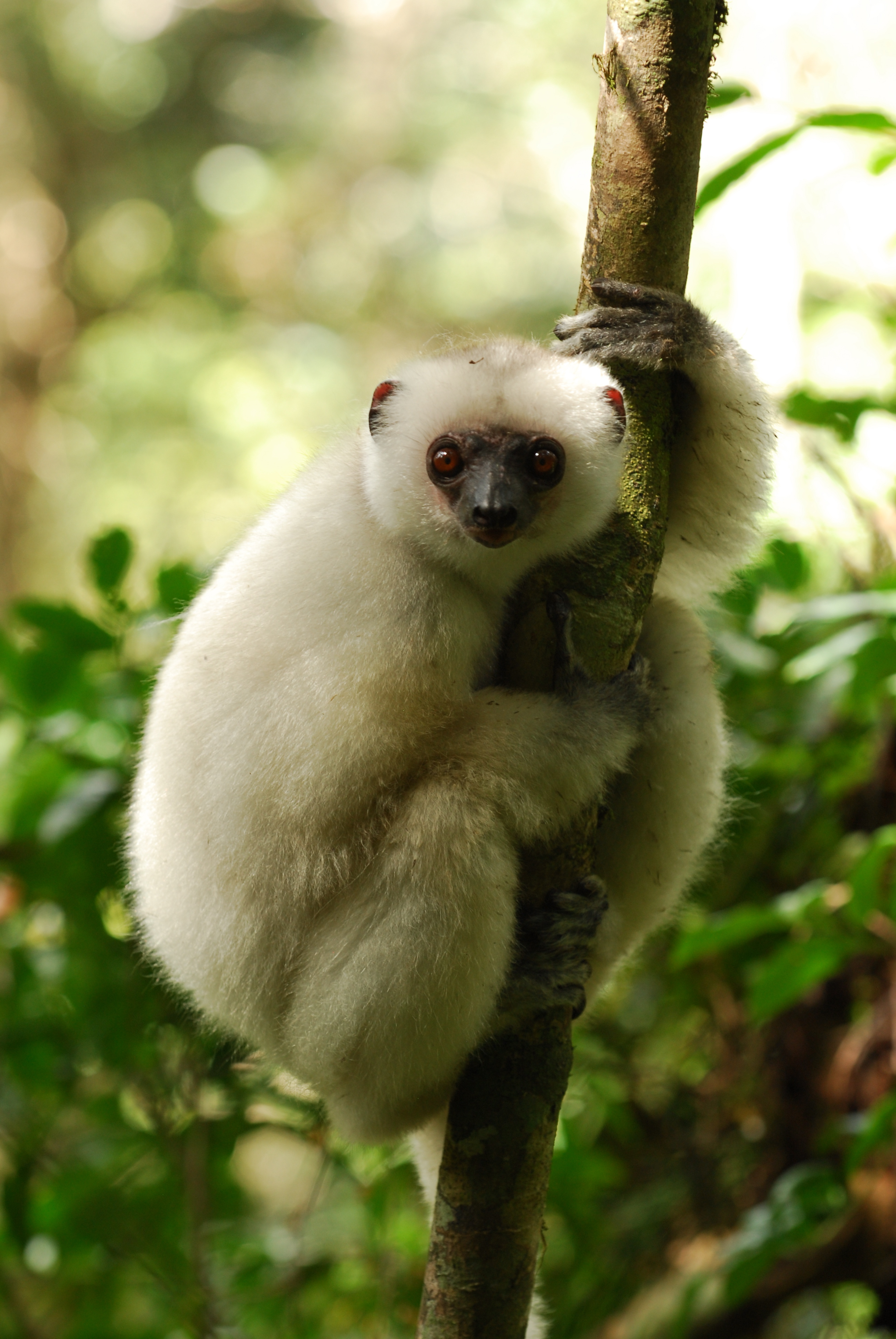
The silky sifaka (Propithecus candidus), found only in Madagascar, was on The World's 25 Most Endangered Primates list from 2000 to 2014. Between 100 and 1,000 individuals are left in the wild.

The World's 25 Most Endangered Primates is a list of highly endangered primate species selected and published by the International Union for Conservation of Nature (IUCN) Species Survival Commission (SSC) Primate Specialist Group (PSG), the International Primatological Society (IPS), Global Wildlife Conservation (GWC), and Bristol Zoological Society (BZS). The IUCN/SSC PSG worked with Conservation International (CI) to start the list in 2000, but in 2002, during the 19th Congress of the International Primatological Society, primatologists reviewed and debated the list, resulting in the 2002–2004 revision and the endorsement of the IPS. The publication was a joint project between the three conservation organizations until the 2012–2014 list when BZS was added as a publisher. The 2018–2020 list was the first time Conservation International was not among the publishers, replaced instead by GWC. The list has been revised every two years following the biannual Congress of the IPS. Starting with the 2004–2006 report, the title changed to "Primates in Peril: The World's 25 Most Endangered Primates". That same year, the list began to provide information about each species, including their conservation status and the threats they face in the wild. The species text is written in collaboration with experts from the field, with 60 people contributing to the 2006–2008 report and 85 people contributing to the 2008–2010 report. The 2004–2006 and 2006–2008 reports were published in the IUCN/SSC PSG journal Primate Conservation,, since then they have been published as independent publications.

The 25 species on the 2018–2020 list are distributed between 32 countries. The country with the most species on the list is Madagascar with five species, Indonesia, Brazil, Ghana, and the Ivory Coast each have three. The list is broken into four distinct regions: the island of Madagascar, the continent of Africa, the continent of Asia including the islands of Indonesia, and the Neotropics (Central and South America).

The purpose of the list, according to Russell Mittermeier, the former president of CI, is "to highlight those [primate species] that are most at risk, to attract the attention of the public, to stimulate national governments to do more, and especially to find the resources to implement desperately needed conservation measures." Species are selected for the list based on two primary reasons: extremely small population sizes and very rapid drops in numbers. These reasons are heavily influenced by habitat loss and hunting, the two greatest threats primates face. More specifically, threats listed in the report include deforestation due to slash-and-burn agriculture, clearing for pasture or farmland, charcoal production, firewood production, illegal logging, selective logging, mining, land development, and cash crop production; forest fragmentation; small population sizes; live capture for the exotic pet trade; and hunting for bushmeat and traditional medicine. Twelve species were dropped from the 2018–2020 list; Mittermeier notes that this was not because their situation has improved, but it was instead done to focus attention on other species that are also have "bleak prospects for their survival.

== Key ==
Key for column headings
Species	Common and scientific name of the species, including a picture if available
Years listed	Years the species has been included in the IUCN's list of the "Top 25 Most Endangered Primates"
Location(s)	Countries in which it is found
Estimated population	Latest population estimate from the IUCN
IUCN status	Conservation status of the species, per the IUCN as of the date of the latest list publication
Threats	A list of threats facing the species; used by the IUCN in assessing conservation status

== Current list ==
The World's 25 Most Endangered Primates, 2023–2025: Madagascar
Species	Years listed	Location(s)	Estimated population	IUCN status	Threats
Microcebus berthae Madame Berthe's mouse lemur Microcebus berthae	2012; 2022; 2023	Madagascar	unknown	Critically Endangered	habitat loss, habitat degradation (slash-and-burn agriculture)
Lepilemur septentrionalis Northern sportive lemur Lepilemur septentrionalis	2008; 2010; 2012; 2014; 2022; 2023	Madagascar	40 mature 50–70 total	Critically Endangered	habitat loss (charcoal production, logging, mining)
Mirza coquereli Coquerel's giant mouse lemur Mirza coquereli	2023	Madagascar	unknown	Endangered	habitat loss, habitat fragmentation (slash-and-burn agriculture); hunting (bushmeat); weather (drought)
Varecia rubra Red ruffed lemur Varecia rubra	2012; 2014; 2023	Madagascar	unknown	Critically Endangered	habitat loss (subsistence agriculture, subsistence logging); hunting (bushmeat); live capture (pet trade); weather (cyclone)

The World's 25 Most Endangered Primates, 2023–2025: Africa
Species	Years listed	Location(s)	Estimated population	IUCN status	Threats
Rondo dwarf galago Paragalago rondoensis	2006; 2008; 2010; 2012; 2014; 2018; 2022; 2023	Tanzania	unknown	Endangered	habitat loss, habitat fragmentation (agricultural encroachment, charcoal production, logging)
Cercocebus chrysogaster mother and infant Golden-bellied mangabey Cercocebus chrysogaster	2022; 2023	Democratic Republic of the Congo	unknown	Endangered	habitat loss (logging); hunting (bushmeat, human-wildlife conflict); live capture (pet trade)
Southern patas monkey Erythrocebus baumstarki	2022; 2023	Tanzania	100	Critically Endangered	habitat loss, fragmentation, and degradation (agricultural encroachment, charcoal production, development); hunting (bushmeat, human-wildlife conflict, domestic dogs); weather (climate change, droughts)
Cercopithecus erythrogaster White-throated guenon Cercopithecus erythrogaster	2023	Benin; Nigeria	unknown	Endangered	habitat loss, degradation, and fragmentation (agricultural encroachment, charcoal production, logging); hunting (bushmeat, traditional medicine)
Niger Delta red colobus Piliocolobus epieni	2008; 2010; 2016; 2018; 2022; 2023	Nigeria	unknown	Critically Endangered	habitat loss and degradation (logging, oil extraction); hunting (commercial scale)
Gorilla gorilla diehli Cross River gorilla Gorilla gorilla diehli	2000; 2002; 2004; 2006; 2008; 2023	Cameroon; Nigeria	100–250	Critically Endangered	disease (human and livestock transmission); habitat loss and fragmentation (agricultural encroachment, development, logging); hunting

The World's 25 Most Endangered Primates, 2023–2025: Asia
Species	Years listed	Location(s)	Estimated population	IUCN status	Threats
Northern pygmy slow loris Xanthonycticebus intermedius	2023	China; Laos; Vietnam	unknown	Not Evaluated	habitat loss; live capture (pet trade)
Tarsius sangirensis Sangihe tarsier Tarsius sangirensis	2022; 2023	Indonesia (Sangir Island)	9,000–15,600	Endangered	habitat loss and fragmentation (agricultural encroachment); natural disaster (active volcano)
Trachypithecus poliocephalus Cat Ba langur Trachypithecus poliocephalus	2000; 2002; 2004; 2006; 2008; 2010; 2012; 2014; 2016; 2018; 2022; 2023	Vietnam (Cát Bà Island)	30–35 mature 51–54 total	Critically Endangered	disease (human and macaque transmission); habitat fragmentation (development, fire); hunting (sport, traditional medicine)
Simias concolor Pig-tailed langur Simias concolor	2002; 2004; 2006; 2008; 2010; 2012; 2014; 2016; 2018; 2023	Indonesia (Mentawai Islands)	unknown	Critically Endangered	habitat loss (agricultural encroachment, development, logging); hunting (bushmeat, cultural practices); live capture (pet trade)
Rhinopithecus strykeri Myanmar snub-nosed monkey Rhinopithecus strykeri	2023	China; Myanmar	350–400	Critically Endangered	habitat loss and degradation (agricultural encroachment, damming, development, large-scale mechanical logging); hunting (bushmeat, traps set for other species); natural disaster (land slide)
Presbytis femoralis Raffles' banded langur Presbytis femoralis	2022; 2023	Malaysia; Sinagpore	200–250	Critically Endangered	habitat loss and fragmentation (agricultural encroachment, development); hunting (domestic dogs)
Presbytis chrysomelas Sarawak surili Presbytis chrysomelas	2023	Brunei; Indonesia; Malaysia	200–500	Critically Endangered	habitat loss (agricultural encroachment, logging)
Eastern black crested gibbon Nomascus nasutus	2008; 2010; 2012; 2023	China; Vietnam	45–47	Critically Endangered	habitat loss and degradation (firewood collection, livestock ranching, logging)
Pongo tapanuliensis Tapanuli orangutan Pongo tapanuliensis	2018; 2022	Indonesia	< 800	Critically Endangered	habitat loss and fragmentation (damming, logging, mining); hunting (human-wildlife conflict); live capture (pet trade)

The World's 25 Most Endangered Primates, 2023–2025: Neotropics
Species	Years listed	Location(s)	Estimated population	IUCN status	Threats
Olalla brothers' titi monkey Plecturocebus olallae	2018; 2023	Bolivia	< 2,855	Critically Endangered	habitat loss and fragmentation (development, livestock ranching, slash-and-burn agriculture); hunting (used as fishing bait)
Callicebus barbarabrownae Barbara Brown's titi monkey Callicebus barbarabrownae	2010; 2023	Brazil	100–250	Critically Endangered	habitat loss and fragmentation (agricultural encroachment, development, livestock ranching)
Saguinus bicolor Pied tamarin Saguinus bicolor	2018; 2023	Brazil	unknown	Critically Endangered	competition with other species (golden-handed tamarin (Saguinus midas)); habitat loss and fragmentation (agricultural encroachment, development, livestock ranching); hunting (domestic cats and dogs); live capture (pet trade)
Saimiri oerstedii Central American squirrel monkey Saimiri oerstedii	2023	Costa Rica; Panama	unknown	Endangered	habitat loss (agricultural encroachment, development, livestock ranching, logging); hunting (domestic dogs); live capture (pet trade); roads
Lagothrix flavicauda Yellow-tailed woolly monkey Lagothrix flavicauda	2000; 2006; 2008; 2010; 2023	Peru	1,000–10,000	Critically Endangered	habitat loss (logging, mining); hunting (bushmeat, human-wildlife conflict); live capture (pet trade)
Ateles hybridus Brown spider monkey Ateles hybridus	2004 (Note: The subspecies Ateles hybridus brunneus was listed in the 2004–2006 report, but the listing was expanded to cover both subspecies of Ateles hybridus starting with the 2006–2008 report.); 2006; 2008; 2010; 2012; 2014; 2023	Colombia; Venezuela	unknown	Critically Endangered	habitat loss and fragmentation (agricultural encroachment, cattle-ranching, logging); hunting (bushmeat); live capture (pet trade)

== Former list members ==
With each new publication, species are both added and removed from the list. In some cases, removal from the list signifies improvement for the species. With the publication of the 2006–2008 list, four species were removed because of increased conservation efforts: the black lion tamarin (Leontopithecus chrysopygus), golden lion tamarin (Leontopithecus rosalia), mountain gorilla (Gorilla beringei beringei), and Perrier's sifaka (Propithecus perrieri). In 2008, the black lion tamarin went from critically endangered to endangered and the golden lion tamarin was similarly promoted in 2003 after three decades of collaborative conservation efforts by zoos and other institutions. Well-protected species such as these still have very small populations, and due to deforestation, new habitat is still needed for their long-term survival. The Hainan black crested gibbon (Nomascus hainanus), which was removed from the 2008–2010 list, still has fewer than 20 individuals left, but significant efforts to protect it are now being made. Mittermeier claimed in 2007 that all 25 species could be elevated off the list within five to ten years if conservation organizations had the necessary resources.

Unlike the changes in the 2006–2008 report, not all species were removed from the 2008–2010 list due to improvement in their situation. Instead, new species were added to bring attention to other closely related species with very small populations that are also at risk of extinction. For example, the highly endangered eastern black crested gibbon (Nomascus nasutus) replaced the Hainan black crested gibbon. The Javan slow loris (Nycticebus javanicus) replaced the Horton Plains slender loris (Loris tardigradus nycticeboides) because the former has been hit the hardest of Asian lorises, all of which are declining rapidly due primarily to capture for the exotic pet trade, as well as use in traditional medicines and forest loss. In another case, the brown-headed spider monkey (Ateles fusciceps fusciceps) was omitted from the list since no spokesperson could be found for the species. The same approach was taken with the 2012–2014 list.

Primates formerly listed in the Top 25 Most Endangered Primates: Madagascar
Species	Years listed	Location(s)	Estimated population	IUCN status	Threats
Lavasoa Mountains dwarf lemur Cheirogaleus lavasoensis	2014	Madagascar	< 50 in Lavasoa area	Endangered	habitat loss and fragmentation
Daubentonia madagascariensis Aye-aye; Daubentonia madagascariensis	2016; 2018	Madagascar	unknown	Endangered	habitat loss (logging); hunting (bushmeat, taboos)
Gray-headed lemur Eulemur cinereiceps	2004; 2006; 2008	Madagascar	unknown	Critically Endangered	habitat loss (agricultural encroachment, logging); hunting; weather (cyclones)
Eulemur flavifrons female Blue-eyed black lemur Eulemur flavifrons	2008; 2010; 2012; 2022	Madagascar	unknown	Critically Endangered	habitat loss (slash-and-burn agriculture; logging; mining); hunting (bushmeat); live capture (pet trade)
Hapalemur alaotrensis Lac Alaotra bamboo lemur Hapalemur alaotrensis	2000; 2014; 2016; 2018	Madagascar	2,500	Critically Endangered	habitat loss (agricultural encroachment); hunting (bushmeat); live capture (pet trade)
Hapalemur aureus Golden bamboo lemur Hapalemur aureus	2000	Madagascar	< 250	Critically Endangered	habitat loss (bamboo harvesting, slash-and-burn agriculture); hunting
Indri indri Indri; Indri indri	2012; 2018	Madagascar	1,000–10,000	Critically Endangered	habitat loss and fragmentation (firewood extraction, logging, slash-and-burn agriculture); hunting (bushmeat)
Lemur catta Ring-tailed lemur Lemur catta	2016	Madagascar	unknown	Endangered	habitat loss (charcoal production, livestock ranching, slash-and-burn agriculture); hunting (bushmeat); live capture (pet trade); weather (climate change, cyclone, drought, flooding)
James' sportive lemur Lepilemur jamesorum	2016; 2018	Madagascar	1,386	Critically Endangered	habitat loss and degradation; hunting
Lepilemur sahamalazensis Sahamalaza sportive lemur Lepilemur sahamalazensis	2006	Madagascar	unknown	Critically Endangered	habitat loss (agricultural encroachment, charcoal production, logging); hunting (bushmeat)
Microcebus gerpi Gerp's mouse lemur Microcebus gerpi	2016	Madagascar	unknown	Critically Endangered	habitat loss and degradation (agricultural encroachment, logging); hunting
Microcebus manitatra Claire's mouse lemur Microcebus manitatra	2018	Madagascar	unknown	Endangered	habitat loss
Prolemur simus Greater bamboo lemur Prolemur simus	2002; 2004; 2006; 2008; 2010	Madagascar	< 500	Critically Endangered	habitat loss (bamboo extraction, logging, mining, slash-and-burn agriculture); hunting; live capture (pet trade)
Propithecus candidus Silky sifaka Propithecus candidus	2000; 2002; 2004; 2006; 2008; 2010; 2012	Madagascar	< 250	Critically Endangered	habitat loss (agricultural encroachment, logging, mining, slash-and-burn agriculture); hunting (bushmeat)
Propithecus coquereli Coquerel's sifaka Propithecus coquereli	2022	Madagascar	unknown	Critically Endangered	habitat loss (charcoal production, livestock ranching, slash-and-burn agriculture); hunting (bushmeat)
Propithecus perrieri Perrier's sifaka Propithecus perrieri	2000; 2002; 2004; 2014; 2016	Madagascar	125	Critically Endangered	habitat loss (charcoal production, livestock ranching, mining, slash-and-burn agriculture); hunting
Propithecus tattersalli Golden-crowned sifaka Propithecus tattersalli	2000	Madagascar	4,000–5,000	Critically Endangered	habitat loss (agricultural encroachment, charcoal production, firewood extraction, mining, slash-and-burn agriculture); hunting (itinerant miners)
Varecia variegata Black-and-white ruffed lemur Varecia variegata	2010	Madagascar	unknown	Critically Endangered	habitat loss (logging, slash-and-burn agriculture); hunting; weather (climate change)

Primates formerly listed in the Top 25 Most Endangered Primates: Africa
Species	Years listed	Location(s)	Estimated population	IUCN status	Threats
Tana River mangabey Cercocebus galeritus	2002	Kenya	1000–1,000	Critically Endangered	habitat loss (agricultural encroachment, development); weather (flooding)
Cercocebus lunulatus White-naped mangabey Cercocebus lunulatus	2000; 2002; 2004	Burkina Faso; Ghana; Ivory Coast	unknown	Endangered	habitat loss and fragmentation (agricultural encroachment, firewood extraction, logging); hunting (bushmeat); weather (fire)
Cercocebus sanjei Sanje mangabey Cercocebus sanjei	2000; 2002; 2004	Tanzania	1,300–3,500	Endangered	habitat loss (logging); hunting
Cercopithecus roloway Roloway monkey Cercopithecus roloway	2002; 2006; 2008; 2010; 2012; 2014; 2016; 2018; 2022	Ghana; Ivory Coast	< 2,000	Critically Endangered	habitat loss and degradation (agricultural encroachment); hunting (bushmeat)
Sclater's guenon Sclater's guenon Cercopithecus sclateri	2000	Nigeria	unknown	Endangered	habitat loss and fragmentation (agricultural encroachment, development, oil extraction)
Colobus vellerosus Ursine colobus Colobus vellerosus	2016; 2018	Benin; Burkina Faso; Ghana; Ivory Coast; Nigeria; Togo	975	Critically Endangered	habitat loss (agricultural encroachment, development, mining); hunting
Gorilla beringei beringei Mountain gorilla Gorilla beringei beringei	2000; 2002; 2004	Rwanda; Uganda	600	Critically Endangered	disease (human transmission); habitat loss and degradation (bamboo extraction, charcoal production, development, firewood extraction, logging); hunting (human-wildlife conflict, non-target species); weather (climate change)
Gorilla beringei graueri Eastern lowland gorilla Gorilla beringei graueri	2010; 2012; 2014; 2016	Democratic Republic of the Congo	3,800	Critically Endangered	habitat loss and degradation (bamboo extraction, charcoal production, livestock ranching, logging, mining, slash-and-burn agriculture); hunting (bushmeat; live capture (pet trade)
Mandrillus leucophaeus Drill; Mandrillus leucophaeus	2000	Cameroon; Equatorial Guinea (Bioko); Nigeria	4,000	Endangered	habitat loss and fragmentation (agricultural encroachment, logging); hunting (bushmeat)
Pan troglodytes ellioti Nigeria-Cameroon chimpanzee Pan troglodytes ellioti	2022	Cameroon; Nigeria	< 6,000	Endangered	habitat loss and degradation (agricultural encroachment, fire, livestock grazing, logging); hunting (bushmeat, traditional medicine); intergroup violence
Pan troglodytes verus Western chimpanzee Pan troglodytes verus	2018	Ghana; Guinea; Guinea-Bissau; Ivory Coast; Liberia; Mali; Senegal; Sierra Leon	18,000–65,000	Critically Endangered	disease (ebola); habitat loss and fragmentation (agricultural encroachment, logging, mining, oil extraction, slash-and-burn agriculture); hunting (bushmeat, human-wildlife conflict, traditional medicine); live capture (pet trade)
Paragalago orinus Uluguru bushbaby Paragalago orinus	2004; 2016	Kenya; Tanzania	unknown	Vulnerable	habitat loss and degradation (agricultural encroachment, logging)
Pennant's colobus Piliocolobus pennantii	2004; 2006; 2010; 2012	Equatorial Guinea (Bioko Island); Nigeria; Republic of the Congo	unknown	Critically Endangered	habitat loss and degradation (development); hunting (bushmeat)
Preuss's red colobus Piliocolobus preussi	2014	Cameroon	unknown	Critically Endangered	habitat loss and degradation (agricultural encroachment); hunting (bushmeat)
Piliocolobus rufomitratus Tana River red colobus Piliocolobus rufomitratus	2002; 2004; 2006; 2008; 2012; 2014; 2018	Kenya	1,000	Critically Endangered	habitat loss (agricultural encroachment, livestock ranching, logging); natural disasters (flooding)
Miss Waldron's red colobus Piliocolobus waldroni	2000; 2002; 2006	Ghana; Ivory Coast	unknown	Critically Endangered possibly extinct	habitat loss (agricultural encroachment, charcoal production, logging); hunting (bushmeat, subsistence and commercial)
Rungwecebus kipunji Kipunji; Rungwecebus kipunji	2006; 2008; 2018	Tanzania	1,042	Critically Endangered	habitat loss and degradation (agricultural encroachment, charcoal production, logging); hunting (bushmeat, human-wildlife conflict)

Primates formerly listed in the Top 25 Most Endangered Primates: Asia
Species	Years listed	Location(s)	Estimated population	IUCN status	Threats
Carlito syrichta Philippine tarsier Carlito syrichta	2014	The Philippines	unknown	Near-Threatened	habitat loss (development); hunting (bushmeat); live capture (pet trade)
Hoolock hoolock Western hoolock gibbon Hoolock hoolock	2006; 2008	Bangladesh; India; Myanmar	unknown	Endangered	habitat loss and fragmentation (agricultural encroachment, bamboo extraction, logging, mining, oil extraction); hunting (bushmeat, non-targeted, traditional medicine)
Skywalker hoolock gibbon Hoolock tianxing	2018; 2022	China; Myanmar	200 (China); 10,000–50,000 (Myanmar)	Endangered	habitat loss, degradation, and fragmentation (agricultural encroachment, logging, mining, slash-and-burn agriculture); hunting (traditional medicine)
Hylobates moloch Silvery gibbon Hylobates moloch	2000	Indonesia (Java)	unknown	Endangered	habitat loss; hunting; live capture (pet trade)
Horton Plains slender loris Loris tardigradus nycticeboides	2004; 2006	Sri Lanka	90–100	Critically Endangered	habitat loss (agricultural encroachment, development, firewood extraction); invasive species
Macaca silenus Lion-tailed macaque Macaca silenus	2010	India	2,400–2,500	Endangered	habitat loss, degradation, and fragmentation (agricultural encroachment, logging); hunting (bushmeat, traditional medicine); live capture (pet trade)
Nomascus hainanus Hainan black crested gibbon Nomascus hainanus	2000; 2004; 2006; 2014; 2016	China (Hainan)	10	Critically Endangered	habitat loss; hunting (non-target species); small population size (inbreeding)
Nycticebus javanicus Javan slow loris Nycticebus javanicus	2008; 2010; 2012; 2014; 2016; 2018; 2022	Indonesia (Java)	unknown	Critically Endangered	habitat loss and fragmentation (agricultural encroachment); hunting (traditional medicine); hybridization; live capture (pet trade)
Pongo abelii Sumatran orangutan Pongo abelii	2000; 2002; 2004; 2006; 2008; 2014	Indonesia (Sumatra)	13,846	Critically Endangered	habitat losss and fragmentation (agricultural encroachment, logging); hunting (human-wildlife conflict); live capture (pet trade)
Pongo pygmaeus Bornean orangutan Pongo pygmaeus	2010; 2016	Indonesia (West Kalimantan, Borneo); Malaysia (Sarawak)	unknown	Critically Endangered	habitat loss and fragmentation (agricultural encroachment, fire, logging); hunting (bushmeat, human-wildlife conflict); weather (climate change)
Presbytis canicrus Miller's grizzled langur Presbytis canicrus	2004	Indonesia (Kalimantan)	unknown	Endangered	habitat loss (agricultural encroachment, fires); hunting
Natuna Island surili Presbytis natunae	2002	Indonesia	9,000	Vulnerable	habitat loss and degradation; live capture (pet trade)
Gray-shanked douc Pygathrix cinerea	2000; 2002; 2004; 2006; 2008; 2010; 2012	Vietnam	550–700	Critically Endangered	habitat loss and degradation (agricultural encroachment, development, logging); hunting (bushmeat, traditional medicine)
Rhinopithecus avunculus Tonkin snub-nosed monkey Rhinopithecus avunculus	2000; 2002; 2004; 2006; 2008; 2010; 2012; 2014; 2016	Vietnam	80–100	Critically Endangered	habitat loss and degradation (agricultural encroachment, development); hunting (bushmeat, traditional medicine)
Black-and-white snub-nosed monkey Rhinopithecus bieti	2002	China	< 1,000	Endangered	habitat loss (livestock ranching, logging, slash-and-burn agriculture); hunting (non-targeted species); pesticide exposure
Gray snub-nosed monkey Rhinopithecus brelichi	2002	China	200	Critically Endangered	habitat loss (development); small population (inbreeding)
Kashmir gray langur Semnopithecus ajax	2014	India	1,400–1,500	Endangered	habitat loss (agricultural encroachment, development, eco-tourism, fire, livstock ranching, logging)
Semnopithecus vetulus nestor Western purple-faced langur Semnopithecus vetulus nestor	2004; 2006; 2008; 2010; 2012	Sri Lanka	unknown	Critically Endangered	habitat loss and fragmentation (development); hunting (domestic dogs)
Pygmy tarsier Tarsius pumilus	2012	Indonesia (Sulawesi)	unknown	Endangered	habitat loss (development)
Siau Island tarsier Tarsius tumpara	2006; 2008; 2010	Indonesia (Siau)	unknown	Critically Endangered	habitat loss (development); hunting (bushmeat, feral cats and dogs); natural disaster (active volcano)
Trachypithecus delacouri Delacour's langur Trachypithecus delacouri	2000; 2002; 2004; 2006; 2008; 2010; 2012; 2014	Vietnam	240–250	Critically Endangered	habitat loss, degradation, and fragmentation (development); hunting (traditional medicine)
Trachypithecus geei Gee's golden langur Trachypithecus geei	2016; 2018	Bhutan; India	6,000–6,500	Endangered	habitat loss and fragmentation (agricultural encroachment, charcoal production, development, firewood extraction, logging, stone quarrying); live capture (entertainment, pet trade); predation (domestic dogs); small sub-populations (inbreeding)
Trachypithecus leucocephalus White-headed langur Trachypithecus leucocephalus	2002	China	230–250	Critically Endangered	habitat loss and degradation (charcoal production, logging, slash-and-burn agriculture); hunting; hybridization

Primates formerly listed in the Top 25 Most Endangered Primates: Neotropics
Species	Years listed	Location(s)	Estimated population	IUCN status	Threats
Alouatta guariba Brown howler Alouatta guariba	2012; 2014; 2016; 2018; 2022	Argentina; Brazil	> 10,000	Vulnerable	disease (yellow fever); habitat loss, degradation, and fragmentation (agricultural encroachment, development, fire, livestock ranching, logging); predation (domestic dogs)
Ateles fusiceps Black-headed spider monkey Ateles fusciceps	2006; 2012; 2014; 2016; 2022	Colombia; Ecuador; Panama	unknown	Endangered	habitat loss and fragmentation; hunting (bushmeat)
Ateles geoffroyi Geoffroy's spider monkey Ateles geoffroyi	2016; 2018; 2022	Belize; Costa Rica; El Salvador; Guatemala; Mexico; Nicaragua; Panama	unknown	Endangered	habitat loss and degradation (logging); hunting (bushmeat); live capture (pet trade)
Northern muriqui Northern muriqui Brachyteles hypoxanthus	2000; 2002; 2004	Brazil	< 1,000	Critically Endangered	habitat loss (agricultural encroachment, development, livestock ranching); hunting
Callithrix aurita Buffy-tufted marmoset Callithrix aurita	2018	Brazil	10,000–11,000	Endangered	competition (invasive marmosets); habitat loss (logging); hybridization; live capture (pet trade)
Callithrix flaviceps Buffy-headed marmoset Callithrix flaviceps	2022	Brazil	2,000–2,500	Critically Endangered	competition (invasive marmosets); disease (yellow fever); habitat loss and fragmentation (agricultural encroachment, development, livestock ranching, mining); live capture (pet trade)
Cebus aequatorialis Ecuadorian capuchin Cebus aequatorialis	2018; 2022	Ecuador; Peru	unknown	Critically Endangered	habitat loss and fragmentation (agricultural encroachment); hunting (bushmeat, human-wildlife conflict); live capture (pet trade)
Cebus kaapori Kaapori capuchin Cebus kaapori	2012; 2014; 2016; 2022	Brazil	unknown	Critically Endangered	habitat loss and degradation (logging); hunting; live capture (pet trade)
Superagui lion tamarin Superagüi lion tamarin Leontopithecus caissara	2000; 2002; 2004	Brazil	250	Endangered	habitat loss, fragmentation, and degradation (development, eco-tourism)
Leontopithecus chrysopygus Black lion tamarin Leontopithecus chrysopygus	2000	Brazil	1,600	Endangered	habitat loss and fragmentation (agricultural encroachment, development, livestock ranching); small sub-populations (inbreeding); weather (climate change)
Leontopithecus rosalia Golden lion tamarin Leontopithecus rosalia	2000	Brazil	1,400	Endangered	habitat loss and fragmentation; live capture (pet trade); small sub-populations (inbreeding)
Oedipomidas oedipus Cotton-top tamarin Oedipomidas oedipus	2008	Colombia	2,000	Critically Endangered	habitat loss (logging); live capture (pet trade)
Plecturocebus caquetensis Caquetá titi monkey Plecturocebus caquetensis	2016	Colombia	< 50	Critically Endangered	habitat loss and fragmentation (agricultural encroachment, livestock ranching); hunting (bushmeat); poison (pesticide)
Plecturocebus grovesi Caquetá titi monkey Plecturocebus grovesi	2022	Brazil	unknown	Critically Endangered	habitat loss and degradation (development, mining)
Plecturocebus oenanthe Rio Mayo titi Plecturocebus oenanthe	2012; 2014	Peru	unknown	Critically Endangered	habitat loss and fragmentation (agricultural encroachment, development, livestock ranching, logging); hunting (bushmeat); live capture (entertainment, pet trade)
Sapajus flavius Blond capuchin Sapajus flavius	2010	Brazil	500	Endangered	habitat loss and fragmentation (agricultural encroachment, development); hunting (bushmeat); live capture (pet trade)
Sapajus xanthosternos Golden-bellied capuchin Sapajus xanthosternos	2000; 2002; 2004	Brazil	< 2,500	Critically Endangered	disease (yellow fever); habitat loss; hunting; live capture (pet trade)

== List history ==
With the exception of the 2000–2002 publication, which was written collaboratively by the IUCN/SSC PSG and CI, the list has been revised every two years following the biannual Congress of the IPS. The 2002–2004 list resulted from the 19th Congress of the IPS in Beijing, China; the 2004–2006 list followed the 20th Congress of the IPS, held in Torino, Italy; the 2006–2008 list after the 21st Congress in Entebbe, Uganda; the 2008–2010 list followed the 22nd Congress held in Edinburgh, UK; the 2010-2012 list followed the 23rd Congress in Kyoto, Japan; the 2012–2014 list after the 24th Congress in Cancún, Mexico; the 2014–2016 list after the 25th Congress in Hanoi, Vietnam; the 2016–2018 list after the 26th Congress in Chicago, US; the 2018–2020 list after the 27th Congress in Nairobi, Kenya; the 2022–2023 list after the 28th Congress in Quito, Ecuador; and the 2023–2025 list after the 29th Congress in Kuching, Malaysia.

Historical membership
	Madagascar	Africa	Asia	Neotropics
2000–2002	Propithecus candidus (Note: In the 2000–2002 report, this lemur was listed as Propithecus diadema candidus, but it has since been reclassified as a separate species, Propithecus candidus.); Propithecus perrieri (Note: In the 2000–2002 report, this lemur was listed as Propithecus diadema perrieri, but it has since been reclassified as a separate species, Propithecus perrieri.); Propithecus tattersalli; Hapalemur aureus; Hapalemur griseus alaotrensis (Note: In the 2000–2002 report, this lemur was listed as Hapalemur griseus alaotrensis, but it has since been reclassified as a separate species, Hapalemur alaotrensis.)	Gorilla gorilla diehli; Gorilla b. beringei (Note: In the 2000–2002 and 2004–2006 reports, this gorilla was listed as Gorilla beringei, but other reports instead used Gorilla b. beringei.); Cercocebus sanjei (Note: In the 2000–2002 and 2002–2004 reports, the mangabey was listed as Cercocebus galeritus sanjei, but it has since been classified as a separate species, Cercocebus sanjei.); Cercocebus atys lunulatus; Procolobus badius waldronae (Note: In the 2000–2002, 2002–2004, and 2006–2008 reports, this colobus monkey was listed as Procolobus badius waldroni, but the spelling of the name has since been corrected to waldronae.); Cercopithecus sclateri; Mandrillus leucophaeus	Trachypithecus delacouri; Trachypithecus p. poliocephalus (Note: In the 2000–2002 and 2002–2004 reports, this monkey was listed as Trachypithecus poliocephalus, but with other subspecies now recognized by the IUCN, it is now known as Trachypithecus p. poliocephalus.); Pygathrix cinerea (Note: In the 2000–2002 and 2002–2004 reports, this douc was listed as Pygathrix nemaeus cinerea, but has since been recognized as a separate species, Pygathrix cinerea.); Rhinopithecus avunculus; Pongo abelii; Hylobates moloch; Nomascus hainanus (Note: In the 2000–2002 and 2004–2006 reports, this gibbon was listed as Hylobates concolor hainanus, but it has since been recognized as a separate species and placed in the genus Nomascus, so that it is known as Nomascus hainanus.)	Brachyteles hypoxanthus; Cebus xanthosternos; Leontopithecus caissara; Leontopithecus rosalia; Leontopithecus chrysopygus; Oreonax flavicauda (Note: In the 2000–2002 report, this species was listed as Lagothrix flavicauda, but it has since been renamed to Oreonax flavicauda.)
2002–2004	Propithecus candidus; Propithecus perrieri; Prolemur simus	Gorilla gorilla diehli; Gorilla b. beringei; Cercocebus galeritus sanjei; Cercocebus atys lunulatus; Procolobus badius waldronae; Procolobus rufomitratus; Cercopithecus diana roloway; Cercocebus g. galeritus	Trachypithecus delacouri; Trachypithecus p. poliocephalus; Pygathrix cinerea; Rhinopithecus avunculus; Pongo abelii; Simias concolor; Presbytis natunae; Trachypithecus poliocephalus leucocephalus (Note: In the 2002–2004 report, this monkey was listed as Trachypithecus leucocephalus, but it is now considered only a subspecies, Trachypithecus poliocephalus leucocephalus.); Rhinopithecus bieti; Rhinopithecus brelichi; Nomascus nasutus	Brachyteles hypoxanthus; Cebus xanthosternos; Leontopithecus caissara
2004–2006	Propithecus candidus; Propithecus perrieri; Prolemur simus; Eulemur cinereiceps (Note: In the 2004–2006 and 2006–2008 reports, this species was listed as Eulemur albocollaris, but it has since been renamed to Eulemur cinereiceps.)	Gorilla gorilla diehli; Gorilla b. beringei; Cercocebus galeritus sanjei; Cercocebus atys lunulatus; Procolobus rufomitratus; Procolobus p. pennantii; Galagoides sp.	Trachypithecus delacouri; Trachypithecus p. poliocephalus; Pygathrix cinerea; Rhinopithecus avunculus; Pongo abelii; Simias concolor; Loris tardigradus nycticeboides; Presbytis hosei canicrus; Trachypithecus vetulus nestor; Nomascus hainanus	Brachyteles hypoxanthus; Cebus xanthosternos; Leontopithecus caissara; Ateles hybridus brunneus
2006–2008	Propithecus candidus; Lepilemur sahamalazensis; Prolemur simus; Eulemur cinereiceps	Gorilla gorilla diehli; Procolobus rufomitratus; Procolobus p. pennantii; Cercopithecus diana roloway; Rungwecebus kipunji; Galagoides rondoensis; Procolobus badius waldroni	Trachypithecus delacouri; Trachypithecus p. poliocephalus; Pygathrix cinerea; Rhinopithecus avunculus; Pongo abelii; Simias concolor; Trachypithecus vetulus nestor; Hoolock hoolock; Nomascus hainanus; Loris tardigradus nycticeboides; Tarsius tumpara (Note: In the 2006–2008 report, this tarsier was listed as "Tarsius sp.", but it has since been formally named as Tarsius tumpara.)	Ateles hybridus; Oreonax flavicauda; Ateles f. fusciceps (Note: The species Ateles fusciceps was listed in the 2006–2008 report, but the common name and description match the later identified subspecies, Ateles fusciceps fusciceps.)
2008–2010	Propithecus candidus; Lepilemur septentrionalis; Prolemur simus; Eulemur cinereiceps; Eulemur flavifrons	Gorilla gorilla diehli; Procolobus rufomitratus; Cercopithecus diana roloway; Rungwecebus kipunji; Galagoides rondoensis; Procolobus epieni	Trachypithecus delacouri; Trachypithecus p. poliocephalus; Pygathrix cinerea; Rhinopithecus avunculus; Pongo abelii; Simias concolor; Semnopithecus vetulus nestor; Hoolock hoolock; Tarsius tumpara; Nycticebus javanicus; Nomascus nasutus	Ateles hybridus; Oreonax flavicauda; Saguinus oedipus
2010–2012	Eulemur flavifrons; Lepilemur septentrionalis; Prolemur simus; Propithecus candidus; Varecia variegata	Cercopithecus diana roloway; Galagoides rondoensis; Piliocolobus pennantii pennantii; Piliocolobus epieni; Gorilla beringei graueri	Tarsius tumpara; Nycticebus javanicus; Macaca silenus; Simias concolor; Trachypithecus delacouri; Trachypithecus poliocephalus; Semnopithecus vetulus nestor; Pygathrix cinerea; Rhinopithecus avunculus; Nomascus nasutus; Pongo pygmaeus pygmaeus	Ateles hybridus; Cebus flavius; Callicebus barbarabrownae; Oreonax flavicauda
2012–2014	Propithecus candidus; Lepilemur septentrionalis; Eulemur flavifrons; Microcebus berthae; Varecia rubra; Indri indri	Cercopithecus roloway; Galagoides rondoensis; Piliocolobus pennantii pennantii; Piliocolobus rufomitratus; Gorilla beringei graueri	Trachypithecus delacouri; Trachypithecus p. poliocephalus; Pygathrix cinerea; Rhinopithecus avunculus; Simias concolor; Semnopithecus vetulus nestor; Tarsius pumilus; Nycticebus javanicus; Nomascus nasutus	Ateles hybridus; Ateles fusciceps fusciceps; Cebus kaapori; Callicebus oenanthe; Alouatta guariba guariba
2014–2016	Cheirogaleus lavasoensis; Hapalemur alaotrensis; Varecia rubra; Lepilemur septentrionalis; Propithecus perrieri	Galagoides rondoensis; Cercopithecus roloway; Piliocolobus preussi; Piliocolobus rufomitratus; Gorilla beringei graueri	Carlito syrichta; Nycticebus javanicus; Simias concolor; Trachypithecus delacouri; Trachypithecus poliocephalus; Rhinopithecus avunculus; Semnopithecus ajax; Semnopithecus vetulus nestor; Nomascus hainanus; Pongo abelii	Ateles hybridus; Ateles fusciceps fusciceps; Cebus kaapori; Callicebus oenanthe; Alouatta guariba guariba
2016–2018	Microcebus gerpi; Hapalemur alaotrensis; Lemur catta; Lepilemur jamesorum; Propithecus perrieri; Daubentonia madagascariensis	Paragalago orinus; Cercopithecus roloway; Colobus vellerosus; Piliocolobus epieni; Gorilla beringei graueri	Nycticebus javanicus; Simias concolor; Trachypithecus poliocephalus; Rhinopithecus avunculus; Trachypithecus geei; Semnopithecus vetulus; Macaca nigra; Nomascus hainanus; Pongo pygmaeus	Plecturocebus caquetensis; Cebus kaapori; Alouatta guariba guariba; Ateles geoffroyi; Ateles fusciceps
2018–2020	Microcebus manitatra; Hapalemur alaotrensis; Lepilemur jamesorum; Indri indri; Daubentonia madagascariensis	Paragalago rondoensis; Cercopithecus roloway; Rungwecebus kipunji; Colobus vellerosus; Piliocolobus epieni; Piliocolobus rufomitratus; Pan troglodytes verus	Nycticebus javanicus; Simias concolor; Trachypithecus poliocephalus; Trachypithecus geei; Semnopithecus vetulus; Hoolock tianxing; Pongo tapanuliensis	Callithrix aurita; Saguinus bicolor; Cebus aequatorialis; Plecturocebus olallae; Alouatta guariba; Ateles geoffroyi
2022–2023	Microcebus berthae; Lepilemur septentrionalis; Eulemur flavifrons; Propithecus coquereli	Paragalago rondoensis; Cercocebus chrysogaster; Erythrocebus baumstarki; Cercopithecus roloway; Piliocolobus epieni; Pan troglodytes ellioti	Nycticebus javanicus; Tarsius sangirensis; Semnopithecus vetulus; Trachypithecus poliocephalus; Presbytis femoralis; Rhinopithecus brelichi; Hoolock tianxing; Pongo tapanuliensis	Callithrix flaviceps; Cebus kaapori; Cebus aequatorialis; Plecturocebus grovesi; Alouatta guariba; Ateles fusciceps fusciceps; Ateles geoffroyi
2023–2025	Microcebus berthae; Lepilemur septentrionalis; Mirza coquereli; Varecia rubra	Paragalago rondoensis; Cercocebus chrysogaster; Erythrocebus baumstarki; Cercopithecus erythrogaster; Piliocolobus epieni; Gorilla gorilla diehli	Xanthonycticebus intermedius; Tarsius sangirensis; Trachypithecus poliocephalus; Simias concolor; Rhinopithecus strykeri; Presbytis femoralis; Presbytis chrysomelas; Nomascus nasutus; Pongo tapanuliensis	Plecturocebus olallae; Callicebus barbarabrownae; Saguinus bicolor; Saimiri oerstedii; Lagothrix flavicauda; Ateles hybridus

== See also ==
- The world's 100 most threatened species
- List of primates by population
