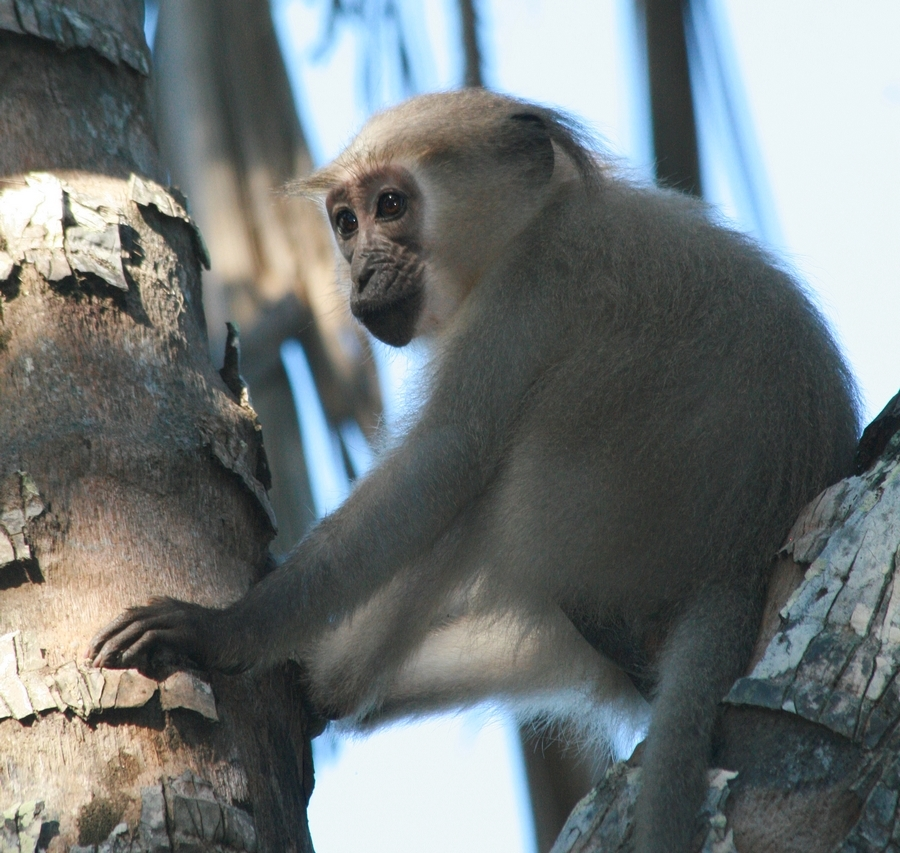

Conservation status
- Critically Endangered (IUCN 3.1)
- CITES Appendix I

Scientific classification
- Kingdom: Animalia
- Phylum: Chordata
- Class: Mammalia
- Infraclass: Placentalia
- Order: Primates
- Family: Cercopithecidae
- Genus: Cercocebus
- Species: C. galeritus

Binomial name
- Cercocebus galeritus Peters, 1879
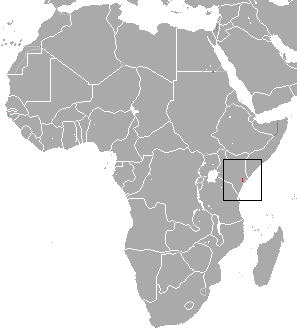
- Tana River mangabey range

= Tana River mangabey =

Species of Old World monkey

The Tana River mangabey (Cercocebus galeritus) is a highly endangered species of primate in the family Cercopithecidae. Some authorities have included the taxa agilis and sanjei as subspecies of this species, while others award these full species status.

It is endemic to riverine forest patches along the lower Tana River in southeastern Kenya. It is threatened by habitat loss and degradation, which has increased in recent years. This species was, together with the equally endangered Tana River red colobus, the main reason for the creation of the Tana River Primate Reserve in 1978, but human encroachment within this reserve continues. Recently, it has been suggested that 20,000 hectares of the Tana River Delta should be transformed into sugarcane plantations, but this has, temporarily at least, been stopped by the High Court of Kenya.

== Physical description ==
The Tana River mangabey is a medium-sized primate with a long semiprehensile tail, a yellow-brown coat, and a center part on the crown of the head with long, dark fur. The species has white eyelids that contrast to its darker face like other Cercocebus species. This contrast in the eyelids is believed to be used as part of the species' complex communication system. The species also has specialized dental morphology for feeding on hard nuts, seeds, and fruits.

== Behavior and ecology ==
The Tana River mangabey is diurnal and semiterrestrial. It spends most of its time on the ground, but is still considered arboreal due to its sleeping area. The species sleeps in trees about 27–37 m in height, which have a sparse canopy cover of 25–60%. The primate sleeps in the forks of the branches of these trees or near the main trunk. It is believed to sleep in trees to reduce the risk of predation and chooses this site according to its last feeding position in the area.

Group size ranges from 13–36 individuals, and sometimes combining to form aggregations of 50 to 60 individuals. These groups consist of multiple males and multiple females. The species has an average day-range length of 1.25 km. During the dry season when food is limited, groups maintain discrete territories with minimal overlapping. To maintain these territories, males give spatial vocalizations and territorial displays at fixed boundaries. The males within the group may also engage in active combat with outside group leaders invading the territory. In the wet season when food is abundant, boundaries are broken down. Foraging ranges for different groups extend, and considerable overlap occurs between the different groups. During this time, groups are more tolerant of one another and meet and intermingle. The Tana River mangabey has a few predators, such as the Central African rock python, crowned eagle, martial eagle, and Nile crocodile.

=== Reproduction ===
The Tana River mangabey is a polygynous species with two or more males within each group depending on the size of the group. The average adult male weighs about 10.2 kg, while the average adult female weighs 5.5 kg, thus exhibiting size sexual dimorphism within the species.

The female gives birth to a single offspring after a gestation period around 170–180 days. During the first two months after birth, the infant is guarded by its mother and begins to develop a close bond. In the third month, the infant begins socializing with other infants and adult group members, but remains in close proximity to its dam. The females within the group usually have lasting bonds with their mothers, while the males become more independent and spend more time away from the group or on the periphery. If a group loses one of its males, another male may be recruited from peripheral solitary males to maintain the structure of the group.

=== Diet ===
The species is omnivorous, feeding on leaves, seeds, fruits, insects, and reptile and bird eggs. An opportunistic feeder, it is semiterrestrial, where it may rummage through the leaf litter for food. The mangabey gets most of its food from subcanopy and canopy trees, although it spends most of its time feeding and moving on the ground. It consumes the fruit and seed from about 50 different tree species. Feeding is performed 48% of the day, while sleeping accounts for 15%, and resting accounts for 14% of the day. The species' annual diet consists of 46.5% seeds and 25.6% fruit consumption. Critical food resources for the species are Ficus sycomorus, which fruits year-round, and Phoenix reclinata, which is also a primary food species and fruits when others do not.

The Tana River mangabey has dental morphology well suited for the food type it consumes. The species has large incisors for the tearing of the tough skin on the fruits it eats. Its large maxillary and mandibular fourth premolars have increased surface area to crush seeds, and its shortened face increases bite force.

== Geographic range and habitat ==
The Tana River mangabey is found in the southeastern portion of Kenya along the Tana River, within 27 forest fragments along a 60 km stretch of floodplain forests. The gallery forest along the Tana River is home to several primate species - the Tana River mangabey, Tana River red colobus, blue monkey, yellow baboon, vervet monkey, and two species of bush babies. This species is restricted to riverine gallery forests in this area. The forests in which it is found are naturally fragmented due to the meandering of the Tana River and its fluctuating water levels. The forest is becoming even more fragmented due to habitat loss from human disturbance, which may reduce species' survival.

== Conservation ==
One of the greatest threats to endangered species is habitat loss. This is also the case with the Tana River mangabey. An estimated 50% of the original forest has been lost in the last 20 years. The Tana River area is losing its forests to agriculture. Felling of canopy trees for canoe construction, wild honey collection, and palm fronds are being used for thatching and mats. Subcanopy trees are being used for housing poles and the topping of Phoenix reclinata for palm wine collection severely impacts the resources used by the species. Tana River mangabeys are also hunted and trapped in response to local crop damage. This trapping may occur and appears to be occurring at low levels within the forests.

The Tana River mangabey is listed as one of The World's 25 Most Endangered Primates. A 1994 census estimated the species' population to be 1,000 to 1,200 individuals. It was listed under the U.S. Endangered Species Act as being endangered in 1970. The species is also listed as critically endangered under the International Union for Conservation of Nature and under CITES is listed under Appendix I. This species is listed on Class A of the African Convention on the Conservation of Nature and Natural Resources.

The Tana River Primate Reserve was established in 1976 to protect the remaining forest along the Tana River and the endemic Tana River mangabey. The reserve protects an area around 171 km^{2} with two areas of 9.5 and 17.5 km^{2} being forested. The reserve contains about 56% of the Tana River mangabey groups, with about 44% living in forests outside of the reserve. About 10% of the groups living in forests outside of the reserve are under the management of the Tana Delta Irrigation Project.

The objective of the Tana River Primate Reserve was to conserve the biodiversity within the Tana River area and protect the endangered Tana River mangabey. The conservation of this species is a high priority for primate conservation in Kenya. In 2007, the High Court in Kenya ruled the reserve was not abiding by the laws. This led to the forested areas that the mangabey inhabited losing their legal protection. With the poor management of the Tana Delta Irrigation Project, habitat loss outside the reserve also continues. The Tana and Athi Rivers Development Authority, which is in charge of the project, are now in the process of expanding to establish a sugarcane plantation, which will in turn remove more forested areas.

A five-year project in 1996 with the Kenya Wildlife Service and Kenya Forest Department was funded by the World Bank/Global Environment Facility. The project's goals were to enhance conservation and protection of these primates and forests. The project was poorly managed and was terminated after two years, leaving the wildlife service with the protection of these areas.

The Ishaqbin Conservancy is a community initiative in the Tana River Primate Reserve. Here, communities are working with Kenya Wildlife Service to develop tourism side-by-side with conservation. Tourism development is believed to be important in that it will secure the conservation of the habitat and the species with the communities around the reserve. Tourism will benefit both the mangabey and local communities through economic development and a reduction in habitat loss. The conservancy will also help to form a buffer around the reserve, which will help to reduce human impact inside the reserve.
