= Hewani =

- Location within Kenya
- Coordinates: 2.24°S 40.19°E
- Country: Kenya
- Province: Coast Province
- Time zone: UTC+3 (EAT)

Hewani is a settlement in Kenya's Coast Province.

== Location ==
The village of Hewani is located within Tana River District.

== Ecology ==
The Ministry of Agriculture commissioned a report about the proposed Hewani Irrigation Scheme in 1979.

Farming and forestry have negatively affected the red colobus population in Hewani, which had notably declined when assessed in 2003.

== See also ==
- Tana River Primate National Reserve
- Tana River (Kenya)
