= Neontology =

Branch of biology that studies living organisms

Neontology is a part of biology that, in contrast to paleontology, studies and deals with living (or, more generally, recent) organisms. It is the study of extant taxa (singular: extant taxon): taxa (such as species, genera and families) with members still alive, as opposed to (all) being extinct. For example:

- The Indian elephant (Elephas maximus) is an extant species, and the woolly mammoth (Mammuthus primigenius) is an extinct species.
- The moose (Alces alces) is an extant species, and the Irish elk (Megaloceros giganteus) is an extinct species.
- In the group of molluscs known as the cephalopods, as of 1987 there were approximately 600 extant species and 7,500 extinct species.

A taxon can be classified as extinct if it is broadly agreed or certified that no members of the group are still alive. Conversely, an extinct taxon can be reclassified as extant if there are new discoveries of living species ("Lazarus species"), or if previously known extant species are reclassified as members of the taxon.

Most biologists, zoologists, and botanists are in practice neontologists, and the term neontologist is used largely by paleontologists referring to non-paleontologists. Stephen Jay Gould said of neontology:

All professions maintain their parochialisms, and I trust that nonpaleontological readers will forgive our major manifestation. We are paleontologists, so we need a name to contrast ourselves with all you folks who study modern organisms in human or ecological time. You therefore become neontologists. We do recognize the unbalanced and parochial nature of this dichotomous division.

Neontological evolutionary biology has a temporal perspective between 100 and 1000 years. Neontology's fundamental basis relies on models of natural selection as well as speciation. Neontology's methods, when compared to evolutionary paleontology, have a greater emphasis on experiments. There are more frequent discontinuities present in paleontology than in neontology, because paleontology involves extinct taxa. Neontology has organisms actually present and available to sample and perform research on. Neontology's research method uses cladistics to examine morphologies and genetics. Neontology data has more emphasis on genetic data and the population structure than paleontology does.

== Information gaps ==
When the scientific community accepted the synthetic theory of evolution, taxonomies became phylogenetic. As a result, information gaps arose within the fossil record of species, especially in Homo sapiens. The anthropologists who accepted the synthetic theory reject the idea of an "ape-man" because the concept had mistaken paleontology with neontology. An ape-man, in actuality, would be a primate with traits that would represent anything in between humans and the other great apes. If the concept of an ape-man were based on neontology, then our phenotype would resemble Bigfoot. Since the concept was based on paleontology, the idea of an ape-man could possibly be represented by the fossil hominids.

== Extant taxa versus extinct taxa ==
Neontology studies extant (living) taxa and recently extinct taxa, but declaring a taxon to be definitively extinct is difficult. Taxa that have previously been declared extinct may reappear over time. Species that were once considered extinct and then reappear unscathed are characterized by the term "the Lazarus effect", or are also called a Lazarus species. For example, a study determined that 36% of supposed mammalian extinction had been proven, while the other 64% had insufficient evidence to be declared extinct or had been rediscovered. Currently, the International Union for Conservation of Nature considers a taxon to be recently extinct if the extinction occurred after 1500 C.E. A recently considered extinct mammal was the Bouvier's red colobus monkey, who was considered extinct up until 2015 when it was rediscovered after 40 years with no recorded sightings.

== Neontology importance ==
Neontology's fundamental theories rely on biological models of natural selection and speciation that connect genes, the unit of heredity with the mechanism of evolution by natural selection. For example, researchers utilized neontological and paleontological datasets to study nonhuman primate dentition compared with human dentition. In order to understand the underlying genetic mechanisms that influence this variation between nonhuman primates and humans, neontological methods are applied to the research method. By incorporating neontology with different biological research methods, it can become clear how genetic mechanisms underlie major events in processes such as primate evolution.
