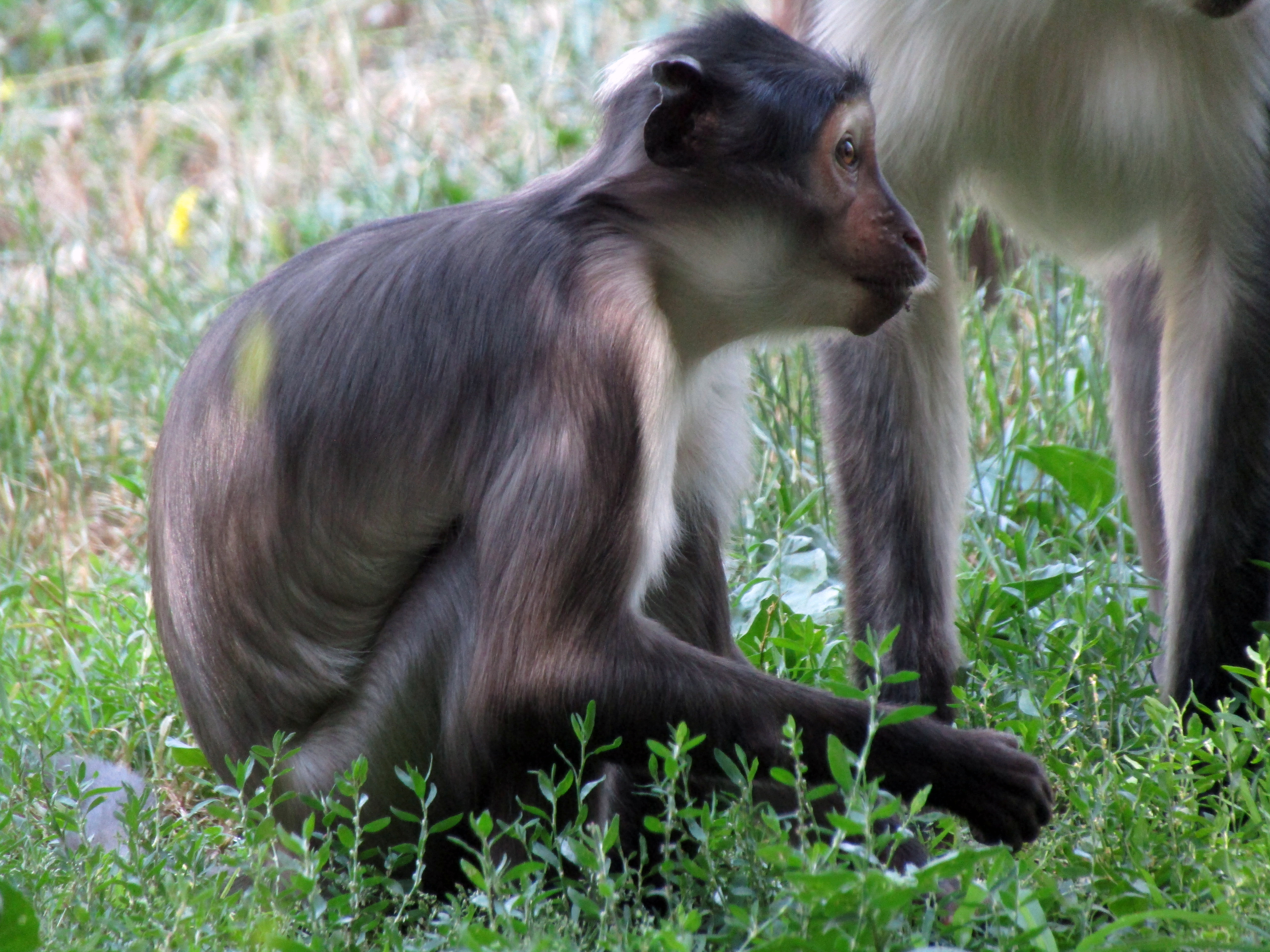
- Sooty mangabey (Cercocebus atys)

Scientific classification
- Kingdom: Animalia
- Phylum: Chordata
- Class: Mammalia
- Order: Primates
- Family: Cercopithecidae
- Subfamily: Cercopithecinae
- Tribe: Papionini
- Genus: Cercocebus; É. Geoffroy, 1812

Type species
- Cercocebus fuliginosus É. Geoffroy, 1812 (= Simia (Cercopithecus) aethiops torquatus, Kerr, 1792)

Species
- See text

Synonyms
- Aethiops Martin, 1841; Leptocebus Trouessart, 1904

= White-eyelid mangabey =

White-eyelid mangabeys

Genus of Old World monkeys

The white-eyelid mangabeys are African Old World monkeys belonging to the genus Cercocebus. They are characterized by their bare upper eyelids, which are lighter than their facial skin colouring, and the uniformly coloured hairs of the fur. The other two genera of mangabeys, Lophocebus and Rungwecebus, were once placed in the same genus as Cercocebus. However, Lophocebus and Rungwecebus species are now understood to be more closely related to the baboons in genus Papio, while the Cercocebus species are more closely related to the mandrill.

== Species ==
Genus Cercocebus – Geoffroy, 1812 – seven species
Common name	Scientific name and subspecies	Range	Size and ecology	IUCN status and estimated population
Agile mangabey	C. agilis A. Milne-Edwards, 1886	Central Africa	Size: 44–65 cm (17–26 in) long, plus 45–79 cm (18–31 in) tail Habitat: Forest Diet: Fruit, seeds and shoots, as well as small vertebrates	LC Unknown
Collared mangabey	C. torquatus (Kerr, 1792)	Western Africa	Size: 45–67 cm (18–26 in) long, plus 60–75 cm (24–30 in) tail Habitat: Forest Diet: Fruit and nuts, as well as stems and roots	EN Unknown
Golden-bellied mangabey	C. chrysogaster Lydekker, 1900	Central Africa	Size: 40–80 cm (16–31 in) long, plus 45–100 cm (18–39 in) tail Habitat: Forest Diet: Invertebrates, fruit, seeds, and nectar	EN Unknown
Sanje mangabey	C. sanjei Mittermeier, 1986	East-central Africa	Size: 50–65 cm (20–26 in) long, plus 55–65 cm (22–26 in) tail Habitat: Forest Diet: Fruit, nuts, and seeds, as well as fungi, invertebrates, and plants	EN Unknown
Sooty mangabey	C. atys (Audebert, 1797)	Western Africa	Size: 40–68 cm (16–27 in) long, plus 40–80 cm (16–31 in) tail Habitat: Forest and savanna Diet: Fruit and nuts, as well as swamp plants, grass, seeds, fungi, and invertebrates	VU Unknown
Tana River mangabey	C. galeritus Peters, 1879	Eastern Africa	Size: 44–63 cm (17–25 in) long, plus 50–68 cm (20–27 in) tail Habitat: Forest, shrubland, and inland wetlands Diet: Fruit and seeds, as well as stems, leaves, insects, and fungi	CR 100–1,000
White-naped mangabey	C. lunulatus (Temminck, 1853)	Western Africa	Size: 52–73 cm (20–29 in) long, plus 68–74 cm (27–29 in) tail Habitat: Forest and inland wetlands Diet: Fruit, leaves, seeds, buds, and grass	EN Unknown
