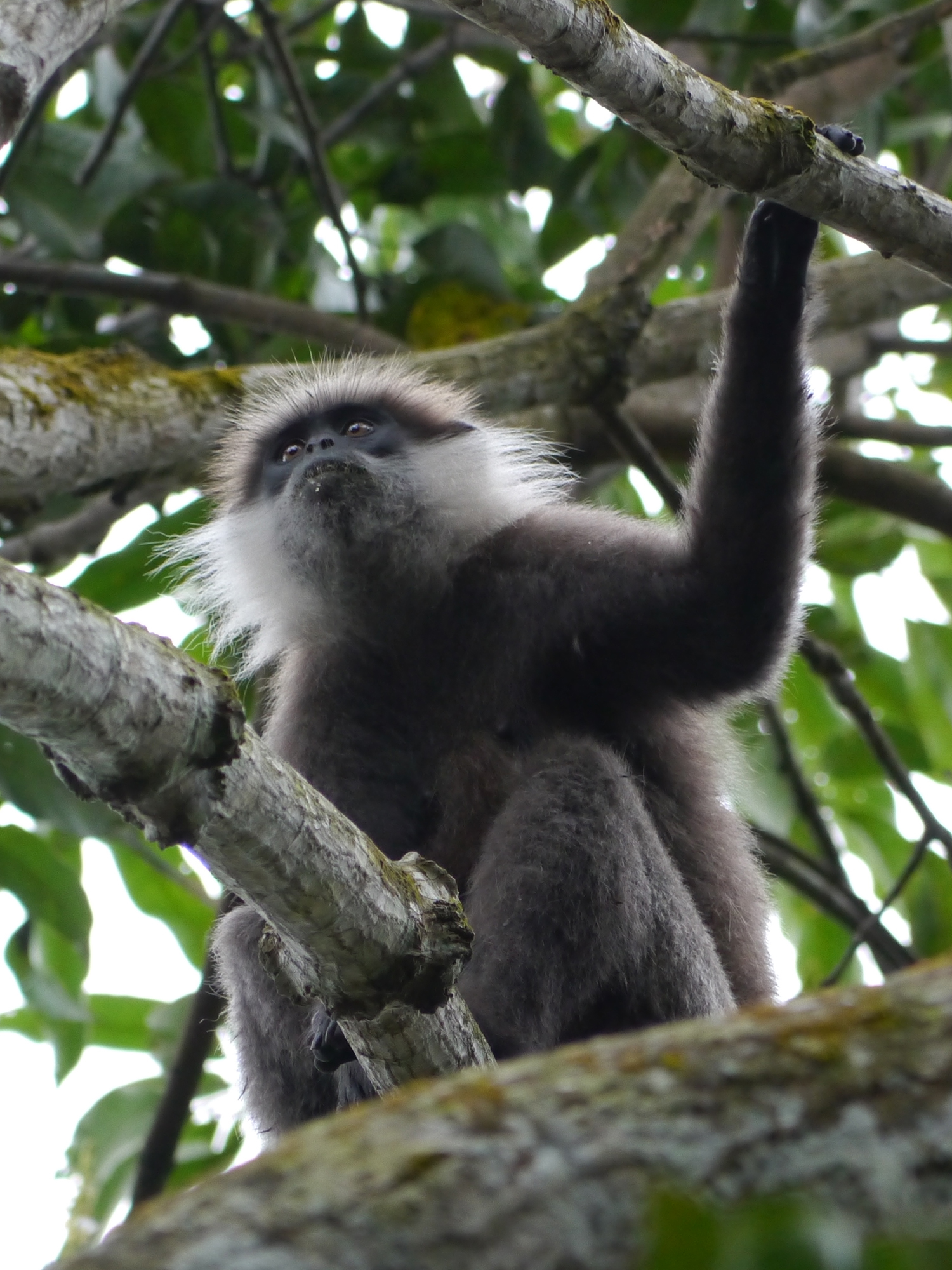

Conservation status
- Critically Endangered (IUCN 3.1)

Scientific classification
- Kingdom: Animalia
- Phylum: Chordata
- Class: Mammalia
- Order: Primates
- Family: Cercopithecidae
- Genus: Semnopithecus
- Species: S. vetulus
- Subspecies: S. v. nestor

Trinomial name
- Semnopithecus vetulus nestor (Bennett, 1833)

= Western purple-faced langur =

Subspecies of Old World monkey

The western purple-faced langur (Semnopithecus vetulus nestor), also known as the north lowland wetzone purple-faced langur, is a subspecies of purple-faced langur endemic to Sri Lanka. It lives in the wet zone in western Sri Lanka around the former capital city of Colombo. This subspecies are known to live in tropical rainforest, specifically in an area of Sri Lanka, where it is noted to rain two times more compared to the neighboring region. The subspecies is generally gray-brown with lighter whiskers, a gray rump patch, and dark forearms and legs. These monkeys also have dark brown or black, hairless faces. Their hands and feet are also hairless. When infants, their fur is medium brown to light gray, however it changes to their darker adult colors at between 12 and 16 weeks old. Typical length is between 48 and 67 centimetres (19 and 26 in) excluding tail, with a 59 to 85 centimetres (23 to 33 in) tail. On average, males weigh 8.5 kilograms (19 lb) and females weigh 7.8 kilograms (17 lb). Their average life span is about 26 years if the monkey was held in captivity. Due to their leafy diet, the western purple-faced langur back teeth, include high crowns and pointed cusps to make eating through greenery simpler. They also developed a digestive system that would allow them to break down cellulose in the leaves they eat. Although, leaves are their primary source of food, they also eat fruits and flowers. Female langurs hold a pregnancy for 195–210 days, and after the birth the offsprings are taken closely cared for by the mother until they are about 12–20 weeks old.

Western purple-faced langurs are tree-dwelling animals, and live in groups of up to 14, where a harem of female monkeys, their offsprings and a male in a position of superiority. In contrast, there are also all-male groups called wanderers. This group of monkeys do not spend time together during the day, but share a common sleeping territory at night. Their region of habitation should not mix but due to deforestation the langurs are losing more and more of their habitat, causing groups to have to share land. Wanderers work towards taking over another one-male group, which can be very aggressive and lead towards the death of the alpha male's offsprings. However, researchers noticed an evolvement in their way of living from one male to two male groups, adding extra protection from potential invaders. Another source of protection is their howling calls that allows communication between langur to inform of location or to keep predators away, leopards being their only natural predators.

Since 2004, it has been considered to be critically endangered by the International Union for Conservation of Nature(IUCN) due to an 80% decline in population over the previous 36 years, and the fact that the rate of population decrease is expected to continue unabated. In 2010, the western purple-faced langur was included in the list of The World's 25 Most Endangered Primates, published by the IUCN and other organizations. Western purple-faced langurs have low gene flow due to living in isolation, which can cause a lack of diversity in this subspecies. This also makes them highly susceptible to diseases.

Reasons for the subspecies' critical endangerment are largely due to deforestation. Studies have estimated that 81% to over 90% of the subspecies' former range has been deforested. A survey detected the deforestation was enforced by human landscape. Deforestation harms the monkey in several ways. The western purple-faced langur is naturally folivorous, and its biology is specialized for a diet that consists primarily of leaves. With leaves less available, the monkey's diet consists largely of cultivated fruit taken from people's gardens, which does not give them much nutrition. This has several detrimental impacts on the monkey - it may not be able to extract adequate nutrition from fruit which it is not biologically adapted to use as a primary food source and the food is only available seasonally, leaving inadequate nutrition outside of fruiting season. Researchers found that groups of langurs would obtain a minimum of bout 69 plant species. Since the western purple-faced langur is naturally arboreal, deforestation also impacts its activities besides eating. With less forest available, monkeys spend more time than is natural on the ground, exposing them to danger from domestic dogs and cars, and they also climb power lines, exposing them to danger of electrocution. Also, when the monkeys are on the ground, they are easier to capture for the pet trade. Hunting is also a concern.The interaction among monkeys and the people that live in the Sri Lanka, has changed with the habitats. Studies showed that the lack of trees was the biggest threat to langurs. The increase in human developments has led 47.5% of patrons to believe these monkeys were pests, as they often defaced the crops and roofs. The only logical turnaround to this is reforestation, which the Sri Lankan government began to replant native species in an approach to increase langur's habitat and population, however the limited preferred species needed to survive can make reforesting Luckily studies on the behavior of this subspecies evolved to simulate with the new habitats and develop a high fruit diet.

Hope for the subspecies continued survival comes from the fact that the largest forests that it currently inhabits are around important water reservoirs and thus less likely to be exploited for other purposes. Many of the villagers that lived around the western purple-faced langurs were Buddhists, and believed that the monkeys should be protected due to their roles in the environment, however some believed in the preservation of the animal solely for religious meaning. Also the Sri Lanka Forest Department is undertaking a project to promote forest conservation. Other programs put into effect, include a home gardening program that provided patrons with seeds of plants the langurs mainly eat to improve nutrition and help towards the reforestation of their natural habitats.
