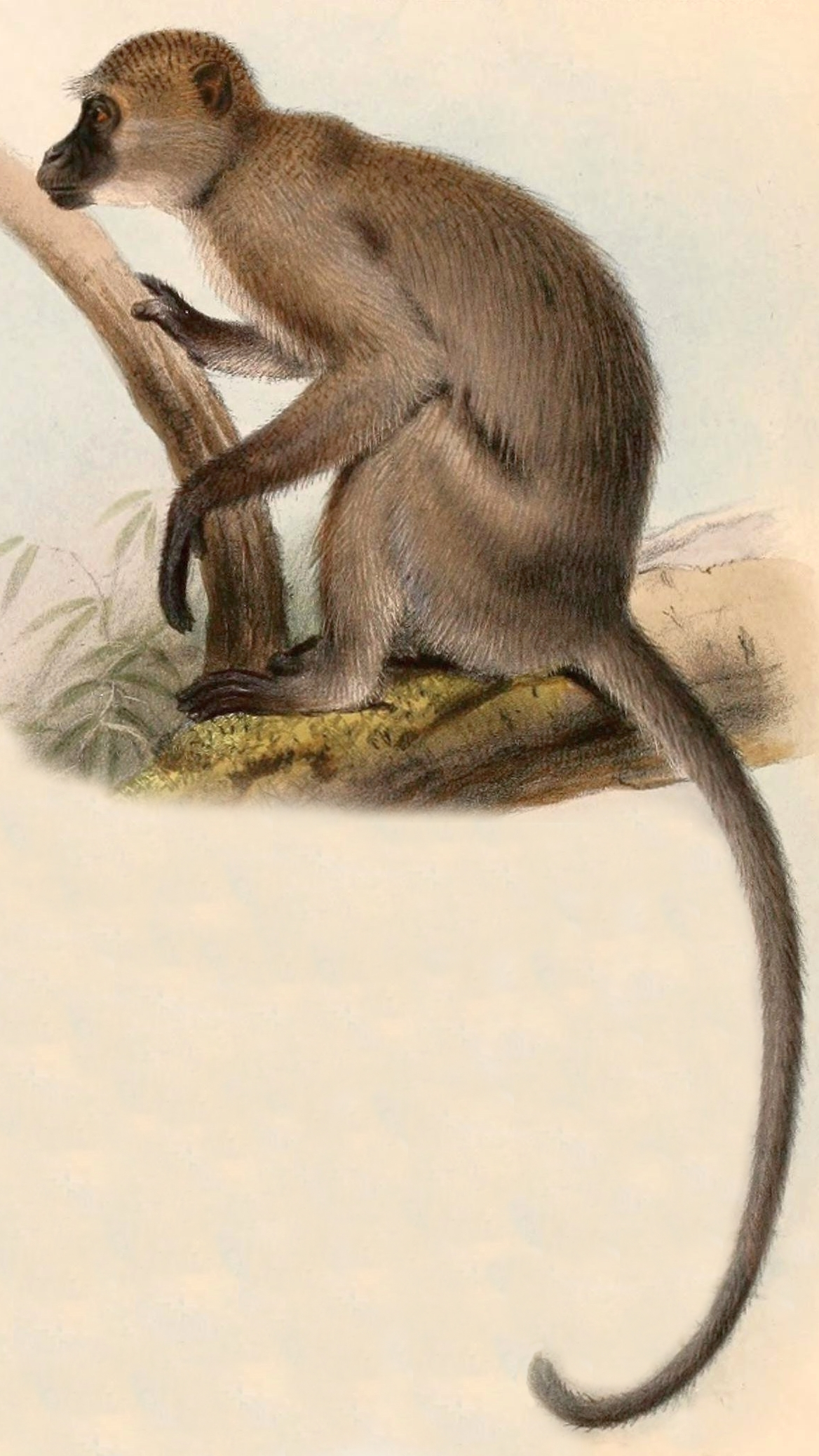
- Agile mangabey illustration

Conservation status
- Least Concern (IUCN 3.1)

Scientific classification
- Kingdom: Animalia
- Phylum: Chordata
- Class: Mammalia
- Infraclass: Placentalia
- Order: Primates
- Family: Cercopithecidae
- Genus: Cercocebus
- Species: C. agilis

Binomial name
- Cercocebus agilis (A. Milne-Edwards, 1886)
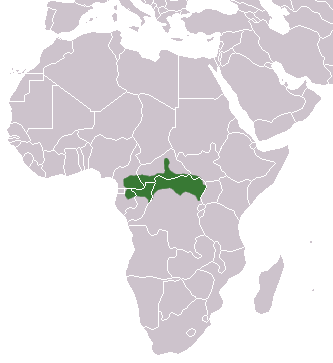
- Agile mangabey range

= Agile mangabey =

Species of Old World monkey

The agile mangabey (Cercocebus agilis) is an Old World monkey of the white-eyelid mangabey group found in swampy forests of Central Africa in Equatorial Guinea, Cameroon, Gabon, Central African Republic, Republic of Congo, and DR Congo. Until 1978, it was considered a subspecies of the Tana River mangabey (C. galeritus). More recently, the golden-bellied mangabey (C. chrysogaster) has been considered a separate species instead of a subspecies of the agile mangabey.

== Physical characteristics ==
The agile mangabey has a short, overall dull olive-grey pelage. The bare skin of the face and feet is blackish. Males are 51–65 centimeters (20–26 inches) in length and weigh about 7–13 kilograms (15–29 lb), while the smaller females are 44–55 centimeters (17–22 inches) and weigh 5–7 kilograms (11–15 lb).

== Behavior ==
Similar to other mangabeys, they are diurnal. Although generally arboreal, they do spend a significant portion of their time (12–22%) on the ground, especially during the dry season. It is typically more commonly heard than seen, and males have a loud, species-specific call that is believed to be used to space themselves out. Other calls are also used to maintain group cohesion and warn of predators. Group size can be as high as 18 members, led by a single adult male. Group meetings can be friendly and may involve exchange of members. Adult males not in groups often travel singly.

== Diet ==
Fruit makes up a major portion of the agile mangabey diet. They are known to eat at least 42 different species of fruit. Their tooth structure and powerful jaws allows them to open tough pods and fruits that many other monkeys can not access. Agile mangabeys eat from a number of dominant swamp-forest trees, including dika nuts and sugar plums, when they are fruiting. They also eat fresh leaf shoots from raffia palms when fruits are scarce. Grasses and mushrooms, as well as insects, other invertebrates, bird's eggs and some vertebrate prey, such as rodents, are also eaten.

== Other ==
Agile mangabeys are known to contract T-cell leukemia virus, similar to the leukemia virus that infects humans. There is also evidence that they contract Simian immunodeficiency virus (SIV), a virus related to human HIV that infects certain apes and monkeys. They have rarely been kept in captivity, with only three individuals held in Species360 registered institutions in July 2008.
