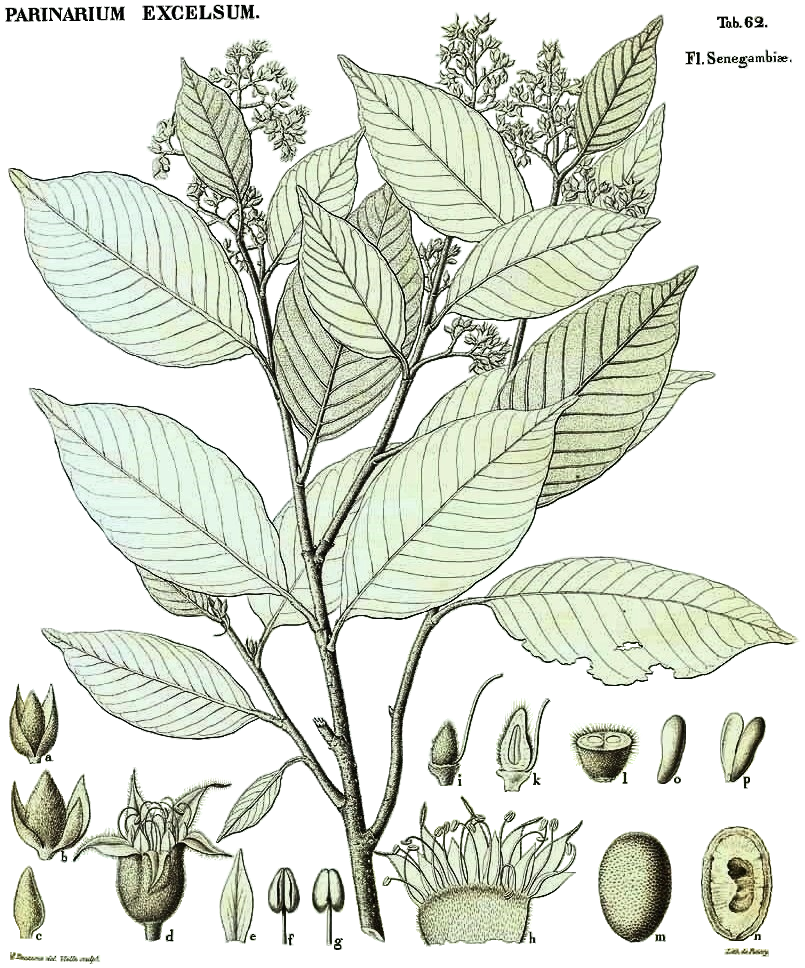
- P. excelsa by J. Decaisne in Florae Senegambiae, 1833

Conservation status
- Least Concern (IUCN 3.1)

Scientific classification
- Kingdom: Plantae
- Clade: Tracheophytes
- Clade: Angiosperms
- Clade: Eudicots
- Clade: Rosids
- Order: Malpighiales
- Family: Chrysobalanaceae
- Genus: Parinari
- Species: P. excelsa

Binomial name
- Parinari excelsa Sabine

Synonyms
- List: Ferolia amazonica Kuntze; Ferolia excelsa (Sabine) Kuntze; Parinari amazonica Mart. ex Hook.f.; Parinari brachystachya Benth.; Parinari elliottii Engl.; Parinari excelsa var. fulvescens Engl.; Parinari excelsa subsp. holstii (Engl.) R.A.Graham; Parinari glazioviana Warm.; Parinari holstii Engl.; Parinari holstii var. longifolia Engl. ex De Wild.; Parinari laxiflora Ducke; Parinari laxiflora var. lata Ducke; Parinari liberica Engl. ex Mildbr.; Parinari mildbraedii Engl.; Parinari nalaensis De Wild.; Parinari riparia R.E.Fr.; Parinari salicifolia Engl.; Parinari silvestris M.Kuhlm.; Parinari tenuifolia A.Chev.; Parinari verdickii De Wild.; Parinari whytei Engl.; Petrocarya excelsa (Sabine) Steud.

= Parinari excelsa =

Guinea plum

Species of tree

Parinari excelsa, the Guinea plum, is a species of large, evergreen tree in the family Chrysobalanaceae. It has a very wide distribution in tropical Africa and the Americas. This species grows to 50 m (160 ft) tall while the trunk is up to 1.5 m (5 ft) in diameter.

== Description ==
Parinari excelsa is a large evergreen tree with a rounded or flattened crown, reaching a height of up to 50 m (160 ft). The trunk is cylindrical, or slightly sinuous, usually branchless in its lower half, with large buttresses at the base. The bark is greyish, either rough with warty lenticels, or deeply fissured and peeling away in flakes. The twigs are golden-brown and slightly hairy. The leaves are alternate, simple and entire, with small stipules and short petioles. The leaf blades are leathery, ovate or oblong-elliptical, and measure up to 10 by 5 cm (4 by 2 in). They have rounded bases and tapering apexes; the upper sides are bare but the undersides are densely felted with brown or grey hairs. The inflorescence is a brownish, hairy panicle, about 12 cm (5 in) long, growing at the tip of a shoot or in the axil of a leaf. The individual flowers are bisexual, with five pinkish petals, and are followed by drupes, some 6 by 4 cm (2.4 by 1.6 in), with fleshy pulp, which ripen to a yellowish or reddish-brown colour and contain large, hard stones.

== Distribution and habitat ==
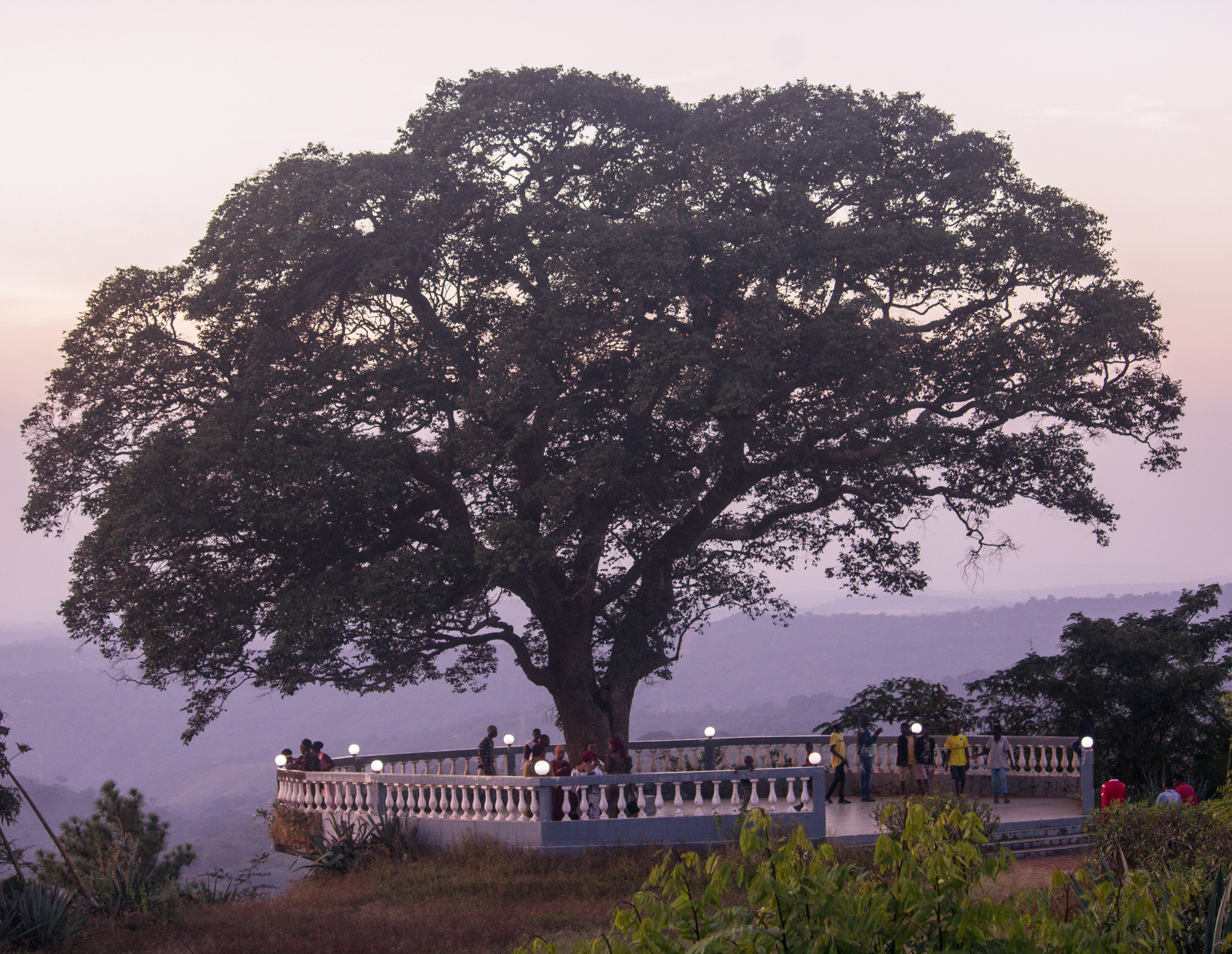
The Kouratier, an old specimen at Dalaba in Guinea

Parinari excelsa is native to the forests of tropical Africa and also grows in South America. In Africa, its range extends from Senegal to Sudan, and southward to Angola and Mozambique. In Central and South America, its range extends from Costa Rica southward and eastward to Bolivia, Peru and Brazil. It is a rainforest species but does not grow in the wettest locations, and is found in dry evergreen forest and gallery forests, at elevations up to about 2,100 m (7,000 ft). It sometimes springs up in clear-felled areas, often in patches growing from seeds or root suckers, and may come to dominate parts of regenerating secondary forest.

Phylogenetic studies have found that South American specimens identified as P. excelsa fall into a separate clade from African ones, and that the South American populations likely belong to one or more separate species. Plants of the World Online treats P. excelsa as a solely African species.

== Ecology ==
The fruits are attractive to elephants, which disperse the seeds in their dung; the tree does not regenerate well in mature forest, but does so in clearings and alongside tracks. The Sanje mangabey in Tanzania also feeds on the fruit, cracking open the hard seeds with their powerful premolar teeth.

At the Taï National Park on the Ivory Coast, chimpanzees consume a significant quantity of P. excelsa fruit.
