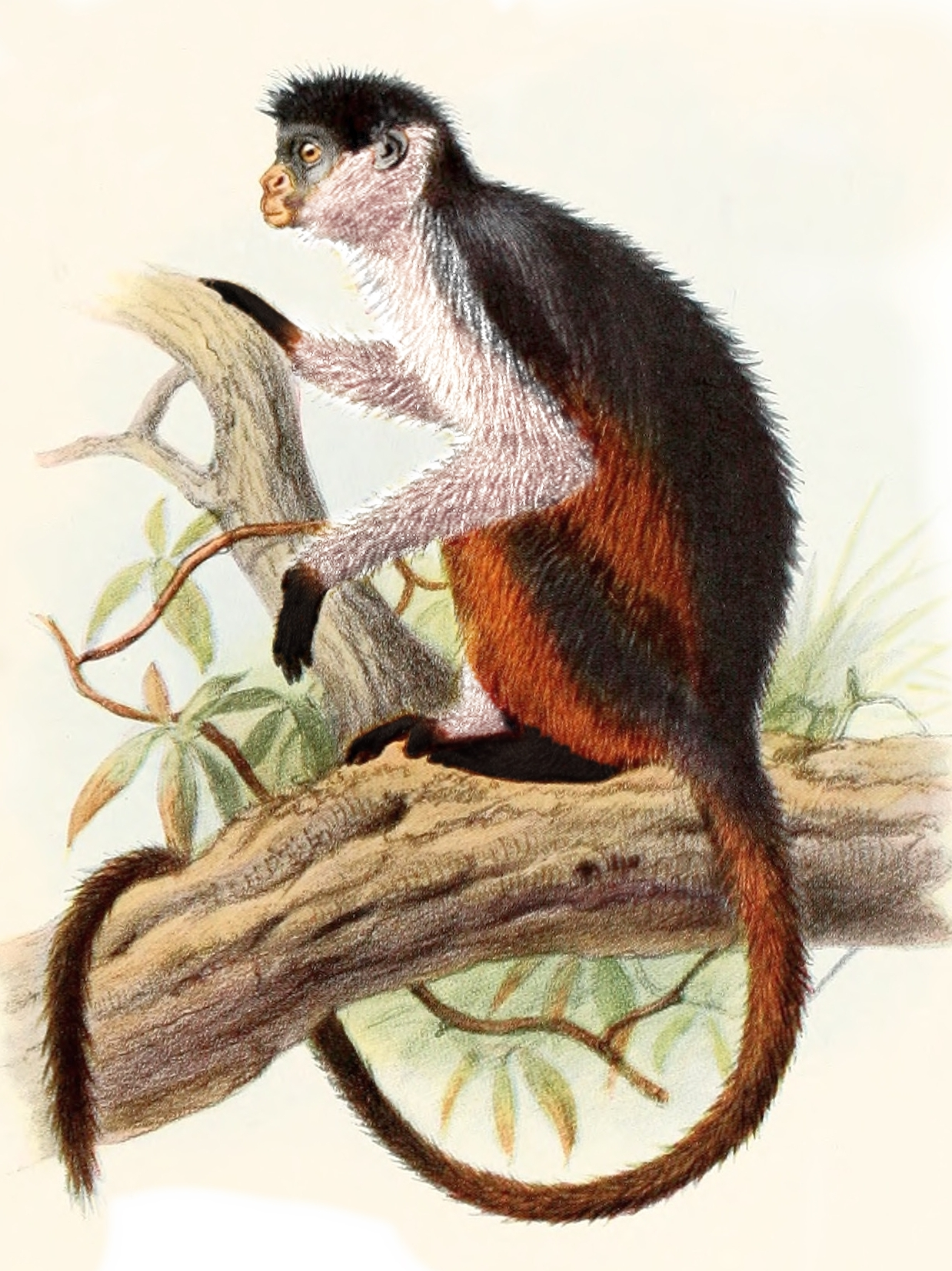

Conservation status
- Critically Endangered (IUCN 3.1)

Scientific classification
- Kingdom: Animalia
- Phylum: Chordata
- Class: Mammalia
- Infraclass: Placentalia
- Order: Primates
- Family: Cercopithecidae
- Genus: Piliocolobus
- Species: P. epieni

Binomial name
- Piliocolobus epieni (Grubb & Powell, 1999)

Synonyms
- Procolobus badius epieni; Procolobus pennantii epieni

= Niger Delta red colobus =

Species of Old World monkey

The Niger Delta red colobus (Piliocolobus epieni) is a critically endangered species of colobus monkey endemic to the western part of the Niger Delta. It is threatened by hunting and habitat loss.

== Taxonomy ==
From the time it first became known to science (in 1993) until 2007 or 2008, it was considered a subspecies of the western red colobus (Procolobus badius) and more recently Pennant's colobus (Procolobus pennantii), and its trinomial name was Procolobus badius epieni or Procolobus pennantii epieni. Colin Groves recognized the Niger Delta red colobus as a full species in 2007, although Groves considered all the red colobus monkeys, including the Niger Delta red colobus to be in the genus Piliocolobus, rather than Procolobus (this nomenclature has been followed here). However, other authors consider Piliocolobus to be a subgenus of Procolobus.

== Description ==
The Niger Delta red colobus is black on top from the head to the rump, becoming orange-brown on the sides and outer legs. The undersides and inner legs, and most of the arms are white. The hands and feet are black. The tail is red-brown on top and chestnut or maroon below, becoming darker towards the tip. It has white whiskers.

== Distribution ==
The Niger Delta red colobus is found only in the western part of the Niger Delta. It is restricted to marsh forest, that is, forest with a high water table year round but no significant flooding. It shares this habitat with several other primate species, including the Nigerian white-throated guenon (Cercopithecus erythrogaster pococki), the red-capped mangabey (Cercocebus torquatus), the putty-nosed monkey (Cercopithecus nictitans), the mona monkey (Cercopithecus mona), and maybe also the olive colobus (Procolobus verus).

== Status ==
When it was first discovered, the Niger Delta red colobus was locally common but under some pressure from deforestation, especially logging of Hallea ledermannii, which is an important food tree for the monkey. Since then, pressure from bushmeat hunting and logging has increased. Red colobus monkeys generally appear to be particularly sensitive to hunting and habitat disturbance, hence concerns that the species may be on the verge of extinction.

The Niger Delta red colobus was still found in the Edumanom Forest Reserve in 2008. However, as of 2008, the International Union for Conservation of Nature (IUCN) considers it critically endangered, due to a reduction in population of more than 80% over the past 30 years largely caused by hunting and habitat loss. In 2010, the Niger Delta red colobus was included in the list of The World's 25 Most Endangered Primates, published by the IUCN and other organizations.
