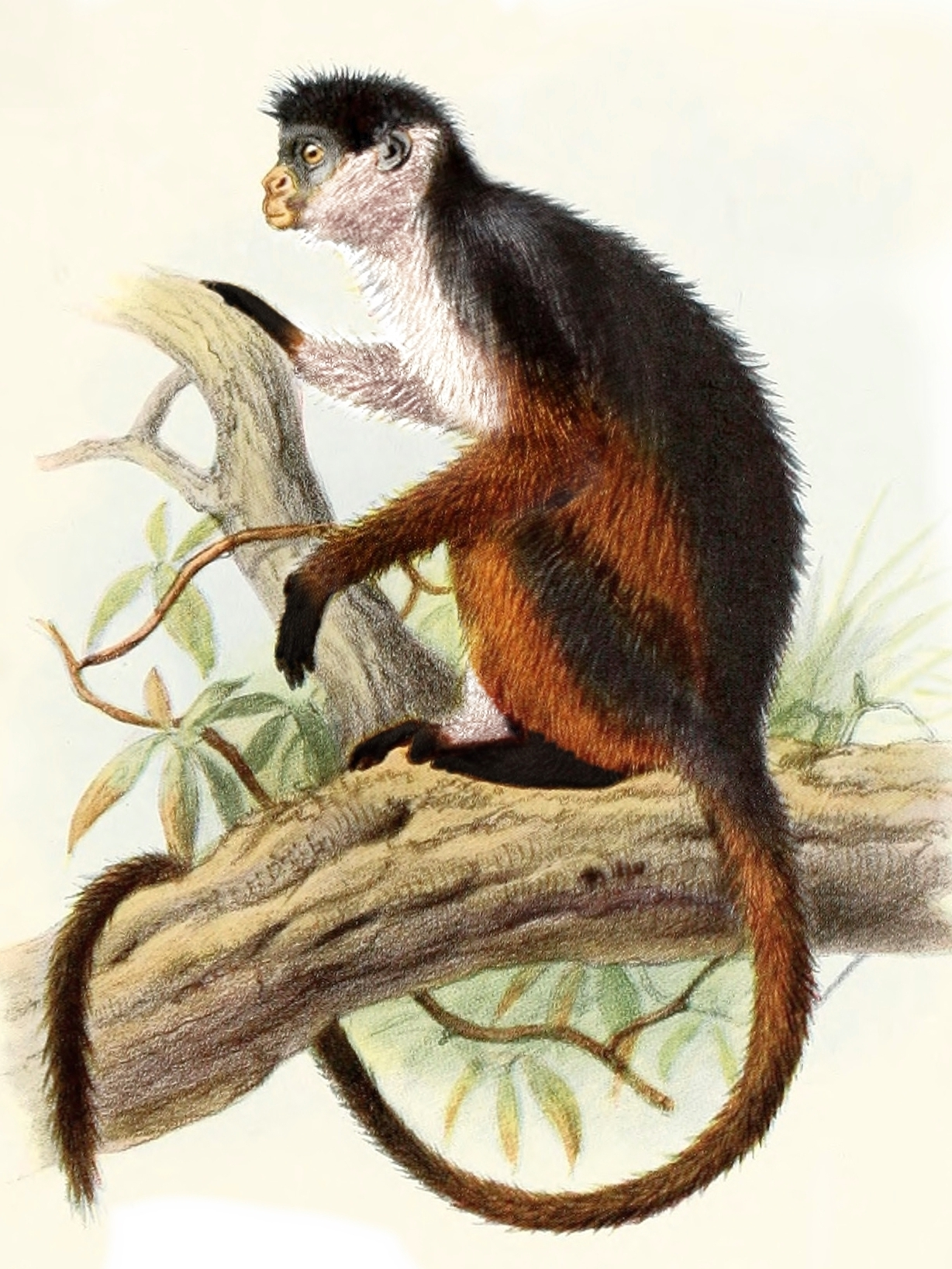

Conservation status
- Critically Endangered (IUCN 3.1)

Scientific classification
- Kingdom: Animalia
- Phylum: Chordata
- Class: Mammalia
- Order: Primates
- Family: Cercopithecidae
- Genus: Piliocolobus
- Species: P. pennantii

Binomial name
- Piliocolobus pennantii (Waterhouse, 1838)
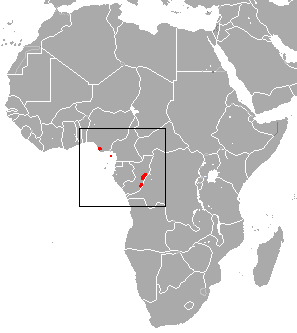
- Pennant's colobus range

Synonyms
- Piliocolobus pennantii

= Pennant's colobus =

Species of Old World monkey

Pennant's colobus or Pennant's red colobus (Piliocolobus pennantii) is a species of tree-dwelling primate in the family Cercopithecidae. It is endemic to tropical Central Africa. Three subspecies have traditionally been recognised but their distribution is peculiarly disjunct and has been considered a biogeographical puzzle, with one population on the island of Bioko (Equatorial Guinea), a second in the Niger River Delta in southern Nigeria, and a third in the east-central Republic of Congo. It is found in rainforests and marshy forests. It is threatened by habitat loss and hunting for bushmeat.

== Taxonomy and etymology ==
Pennant's colobus was first described in 1838 by George Robert Waterhouse, curator at the Zoological Society of London's museum, and was named in honour of the naturalist and traveller Thomas Pennant. Three subspecies of this red colobus are traditionally recognized: The Bioko red colobus (Procolobus pennantii pennantii), the Niger Delta red colobus (Procolobus pennantii epieni) and Bouvier's red colobus (Procolobus pennantii bouvieri). However, Groves (2007) raised P. p. epieni, and P. p. bouvieri to Piliocolobus epieni and Piliocolobus bouvieri, respectively (this nomenclature has been followed here). Ting agreed that preliminary genetic evidence supported elevating P. epieni at least.

The word "colobus" comes from Greek κολοβός, meaning "cut short", and is so named because of the significant reduction in size, or complete lack of an opposable thumb in comparison to other primates. To make up for this, they have four long digits that align to form a strong hook, allowing them to easily grasp branches and climb.

== Description ==
Pennant's red colobus is a moderate-sized species with a head and body length of 53 to 63 centimetres (21 to 25 in) and a tail of 60 to 70 centimetres (24 to 28 in). It weighs about 7 to 10 kilograms (15 to 22 lb). It has a small head and robust body with long limbs. The long fingers have a powerful grip for climbing about among the branches, but it has no thumbs. The colouration varies between subspecies, being black or some shade of brown with chestnut-brown or reddish face, arms and legs and pale underparts. The black face is crowned with long hair, usually parted in the middle. Red colobus monkeys have a long tail used only for balancing which is not prehensile.

== Distribution and habitat ==
Pennant's red colobus is found in several locations in western Central Africa. The nominate subspecies, P. p. pennantii is endemic to Bioko, an island 32 kilometres (20 mi) off the coast of Equatorial Guinea. The monkeys are largely restricted to the south-west part of the island and have a total range of less than 500 square kilometres (190 sq mi). The suggestion that this species has been found on Pico Basile, the highest mountain on the island, has been discounted. Fewer than five thousand animals in this subspecies are believed to exist, with number falling substantially between 1986 and 2006. The Bouvier's red colobus occurs in the Republic of Congo in the tract of land on the right bank of the lower Congo River and along the lower reaches of the River Alima to the mouth of the River Likouala-aux-Herbes, both being tributaries of the Congo River. The Niger Delta red colobus is found between the Forcados-Nikrogha Creek and the Sagbama-Osiama-Agboi Creek in the wet forests of the Niger Delta region of Nigeria. Pennant's red colobus is an arboreal species and is found in both primary and secondary forest and also in marshy forest.

== Biology ==
Like other red colobus monkeys, Pennant's red colobus lives in troops which may consist of twelve to eighty individuals occupying a territory of 25 to 150 hectares. The troops have several males and a rather larger number of females and juveniles. They move through the canopy with agility, leaping from tree to tree and making use of the elasticity of the branches. The gestation period is probably about five months before a single infant is born.

Pennant's red colobus monkeys have been little studied, but their diet is likely to be similar to that of other red colobus monkeys. It mainly consists of fresh leaves supplemented by flowers, fruit, and seeds. They have specialist teeth that can macerate leaves and break up tough but pliant unripe fruit and the seeds embedded in the flesh. Their multi-chambered stomach permits fermentation to occur and they can alternate between a leaf-based and a seed-based diet. They tend to select foliage with a high protein to fibre ratio and a low tannin content. One of their favourite food trees is Fleroya ledermannii.

== Status ==
The nominate subspecies P. p. pennantii is listed as "Endangered" by the IUCN in its Red List of Threatened Species because its range on the island of Bioko is less than 500 square kilometres (190 sq mi) and its population size is decreasing due to it being hunted for bushmeat. In 2006, the population on Bioko Island was estimated to be smaller than 5000 individuals. The Niger Delta red colobus is listed as "Critically Endangered" due to the fact that its habitat in the Niger Delta is being degraded by logging and the monkeys are hunted for food. Its population has declined by 80% during a period of thirty years. The Bouvier's red colobus has declined dramatically in numbers and is also listed as "Critically Endangered", although its status was elevated to "Endangered" in 2019. After not having been seen since the 1970s, it was considered possibly extinct until it was spotted and photographed in 2015 in Ntokou-Pikounda National Park in the Republic of the Congo (the first photograph of P. bouvieri). The subspecies is likely on the brink of extinction.
