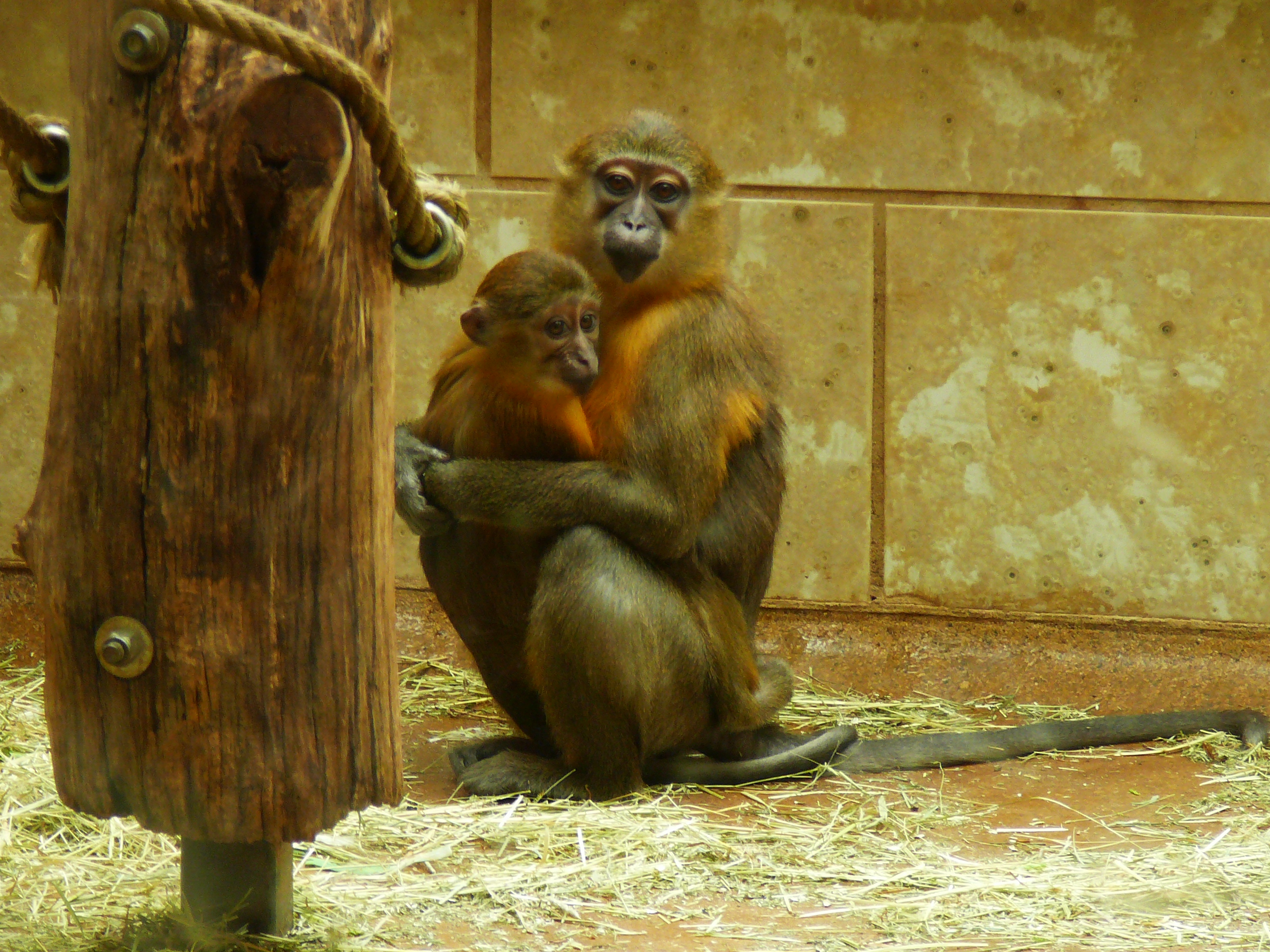
- At Wuppertal Zoo, Germany

Conservation status
- Endangered (IUCN 3.1)

Scientific classification
- Kingdom: Animalia
- Phylum: Chordata
- Class: Mammalia
- Infraclass: Placentalia
- Order: Primates
- Family: Cercopithecidae
- Genus: Cercocebus
- Species: C. chrysogaster

Binomial name
- Cercocebus chrysogaster Lydekker, 1900
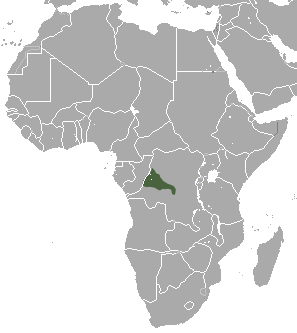
- Golden-bellied mangabey range

= Golden-bellied mangabey =

Species of Old World monkey

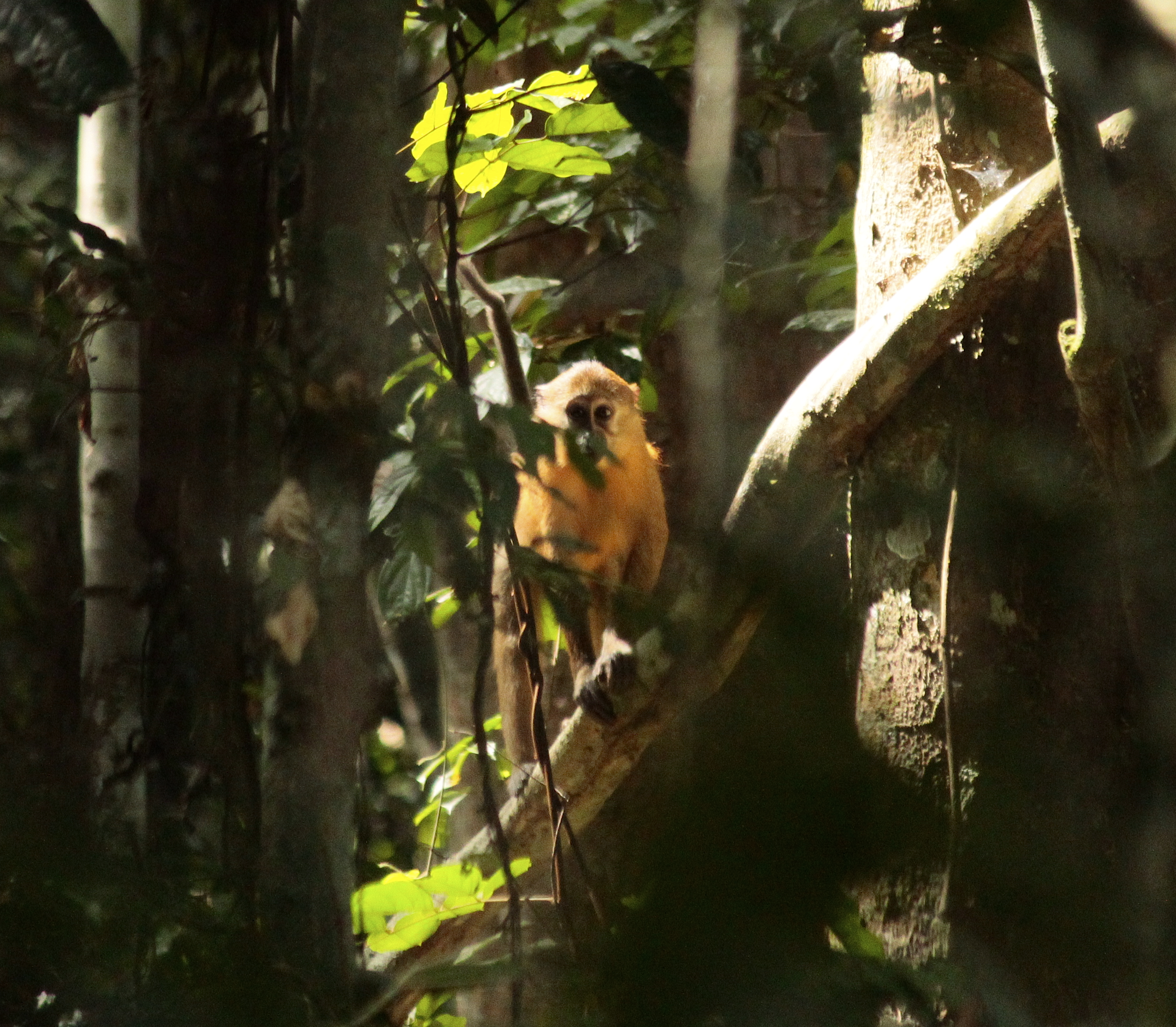
Golden bellied mangabey in the wild

The golden-bellied mangabey (Cercocebus chrysogaster) is an Endangered Old World monkey found in swampy, humid forests south of the Congo River in the Democratic Republic of the Congo. It was formerly considered a subspecies of the agile mangabey (C. agilis).

A study of wild populations found that they form large, complex social groups which in some ways resemble those of humans:

[W]hile individuals form friendships, they also irritate each other by snatching food, accidentally stepping on tails, and insisting on trying to groom newborn infants (which annoys the mom). They make up by grooming and playing.

When faced with predators such as Gaboon vipers, groups will band together and fight collectively. Wild golden-bellied mangabeys have been seen consuming and sharing mammalian prey. (Food sharing is rarely observed in most cercopithecine monkeys.) Golden-bellied mangabeys share a habitat with bonobos and a comparison study found that the monkeys travel greater distances within their home range to feed, significantly further than other Cercocebus species.

Little else has been published about the species and its behaviour has mostly been studied in captivity.
