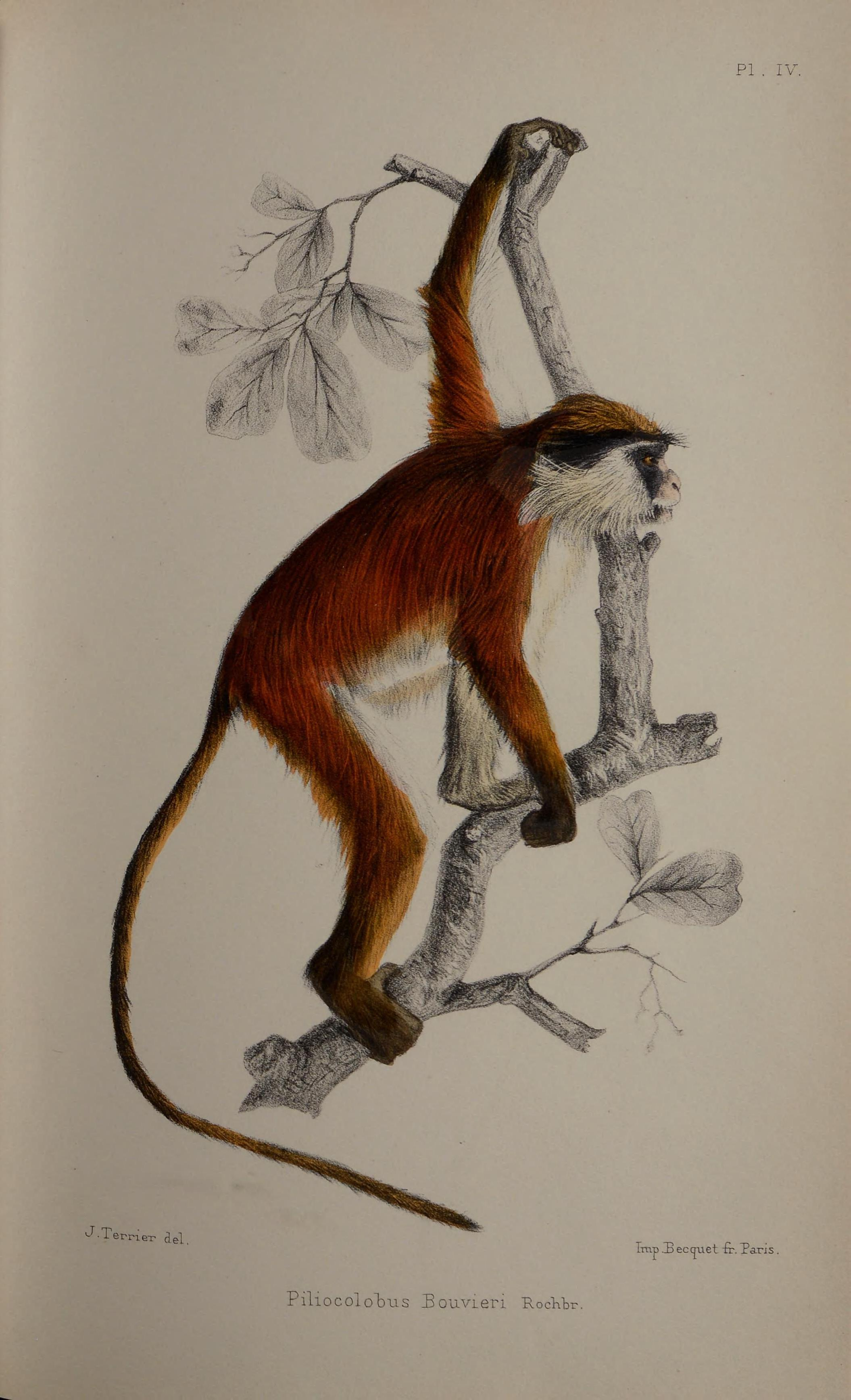

Conservation status
- Endangered (IUCN 3.1)

Scientific classification
- Kingdom: Animalia
- Phylum: Chordata
- Class: Mammalia
- Infraclass: Placentalia
- Order: Primates
- Family: Cercopithecidae
- Genus: Piliocolobus
- Species: P. bouvieri

Binomial name
- Piliocolobus bouvieri Rochebrune, 1887
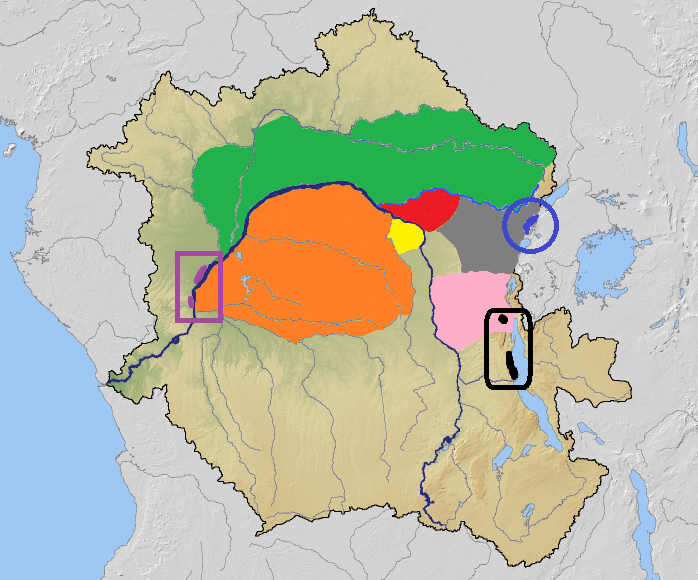
- Bouvier's red colobus range shown in purple (within the purple box)

Synonyms
- Procolobus pennantii ssp. bouvieri (Rochebrune, 1887); Colobus (Piliocolobus) likualae (Matschie, 1914)

= Bouvier's red colobus =

Species of Old World monkey

Bouvier's red colobus (Piliocolobus bouvieri) is a species of colobus monkey rediscovered in the Republic of the Congo in 2015, after four decades without a confirmed sighting.

== Description ==
Bouvier's red colobus has brownish-red fur on its body that is lighter than its closest relative, Pennant's colobus (P. pennantii). Its head has a patch of black to chocolate brown fur that is smaller than that of P. pennantii. It has a white chin and whiskers. A black band of fur extends from above the eyes to the temples. The monkey's eyes are surrounded by large, pink eyerings. The tail of P. bouvieri is long in proportion to its small body and is dark brown at the root, fading to brownish-red at the tip. The fur on the species' underside is lighter than the fur on its back. Bouvier's red colobus is thought to exhibit considerable facial variation from individual to individual, varying from light flesh-colored with blackish cheeks and brows to darker tones throughout the face, excluding the nose and lips.

Bouvier's red colobus lives in swampy forests surrounding the Congo River, between the mouths of the Alima and Oubangui Rivers. It does not show fear of humans, making it an easy target for bushmeat hunters.

== Classification ==
Bouvier's red colobus was first described in 1887 by Alphonse Trémeau de Rochebrune in Faune de Sénégambie. For many years it was considered a subspecies of Pennant's colobus and named Procolobus pennantii ssp. bouvieri. In 2007, Colin Groves reclassified it as a distinct species. Groves considers Piliocolobus to be a full genus, while other authors see it as a subgenus of Procolobus, and thus assigned Bouvier's red colobus the scientific name Piliocolobus bouvieri (this nomenclature has been followed here).

== Status ==
In IUCN's 2008 and 2016 assessments, Bouvier's red colobus was classified as critically endangered with a note saying it was "possibly extinct". No individuals had been seen in the wild since the 1970s and was thought to have lost at least 80% of its population since then, due to hunting and habitat loss. Possible sightings were reported by F. Petter and F. Vincent in the 2000s, but the sightings were considerably south of the species' previously known range and could not be confirmed. In 2019, IUCN updated the assessment from critically endangered to endangered, citing that "its known geographic range now includes previously unknown populations in northern Republic of Congo", but they also mentioned that it is a rarely-reported species, despite intensifying surveying.

== Rediscovery ==
In February 2015, Lieven Devreese of Belgium and Gaël Elie Gnondo Gobolo of the Republic of the Congo launched an expedition to search for Bouvier's red colobus. Starting from the town of Owando, the explorers soon spotted the monkey while travelling on the Bokiba River in Ntokou-Pikounda National Park. They announced the find on March 3 via Indiegogo, which together with the Wildlife Conservation Society helped raise funds for the expedition. In April, the explorers revealed the first ever photograph of the species – a mother with her infant in a tree. Bouvier's red colobus was previously known to scientists only from a handful of museum specimens collected between the late 1800s and early 1900s, although the species was known to the people living in the Bokiba River area. In May 2021 WWF investigator Jaap van der Waarde managed to capture a monkey on video.
