= Tana River Primate National Reserve =

Wildlife reserve in southeastern Kenya (1979)

Coordinates: 1°22′S 40°1′E

The Tana River Primate National Reserve is a former 170 square kilometres (66 sq mi) national wildlife reserve in south-eastern Kenya.

== Geography ==
Most of the area was semi-arid savanna but a small portion, about 13 square kilometres (5.0 sq mi), was made up of small patches of riverine forest.

== History ==
The government of Kenya set aside the land in 1976 as an order to protect the swampy forests of the Lower Tana River and two endangered primates, the Tana River mangabey and the Tana River red colobus, that are found there. The endangered primates inhabit sixteen patches of forest (ranging from .1 to 6.25 km^{2}) which extends for 60 km down the meandering lower Tana River, between Nkanjonja and Mitapani.

Despite a $6.7 million World Bank Global Environment Facility project (1996 to 2001), conservation measures for the two primates have been largely ineffective.

In 2005, more than 250 families of farmers were relocated 90 km away to the coastal community of Kipini.

=== De-protection ===
In 2007, the High Court of Kenya ruled that the reserve had not been properly established according to Kenyan law. As a result, the reserve was degazetted and disestablished, removing all official protection for the area and its National Reserve status and funding.

== Habitat ==
The lush river forest patches are remainders of western African forests. The river cuts through dry woodland and open savannah. Recorded bird species there number 262, and at least 57 species of mammals live there. There are several endemic tree species as well as a variety of other animals and plants. Many of the bird and animal species in the reserve are unusual in East Africa, being typical of Central Africa's lowland rainforest. The white-winged apalis is extremely rare. The African openbill stork, martial eagle, bat hawk, African pygmy-falcon, African barred owlet, scaly babbler, black-bellied glossy-starling, and golden pipit are also rare. Recent research has shown that, if restored, this area could act as a refugium for wildlife with moderate levels of climate change.

== See also ==
- Primate sanctuaries
- Tana River (Kenya) topics
