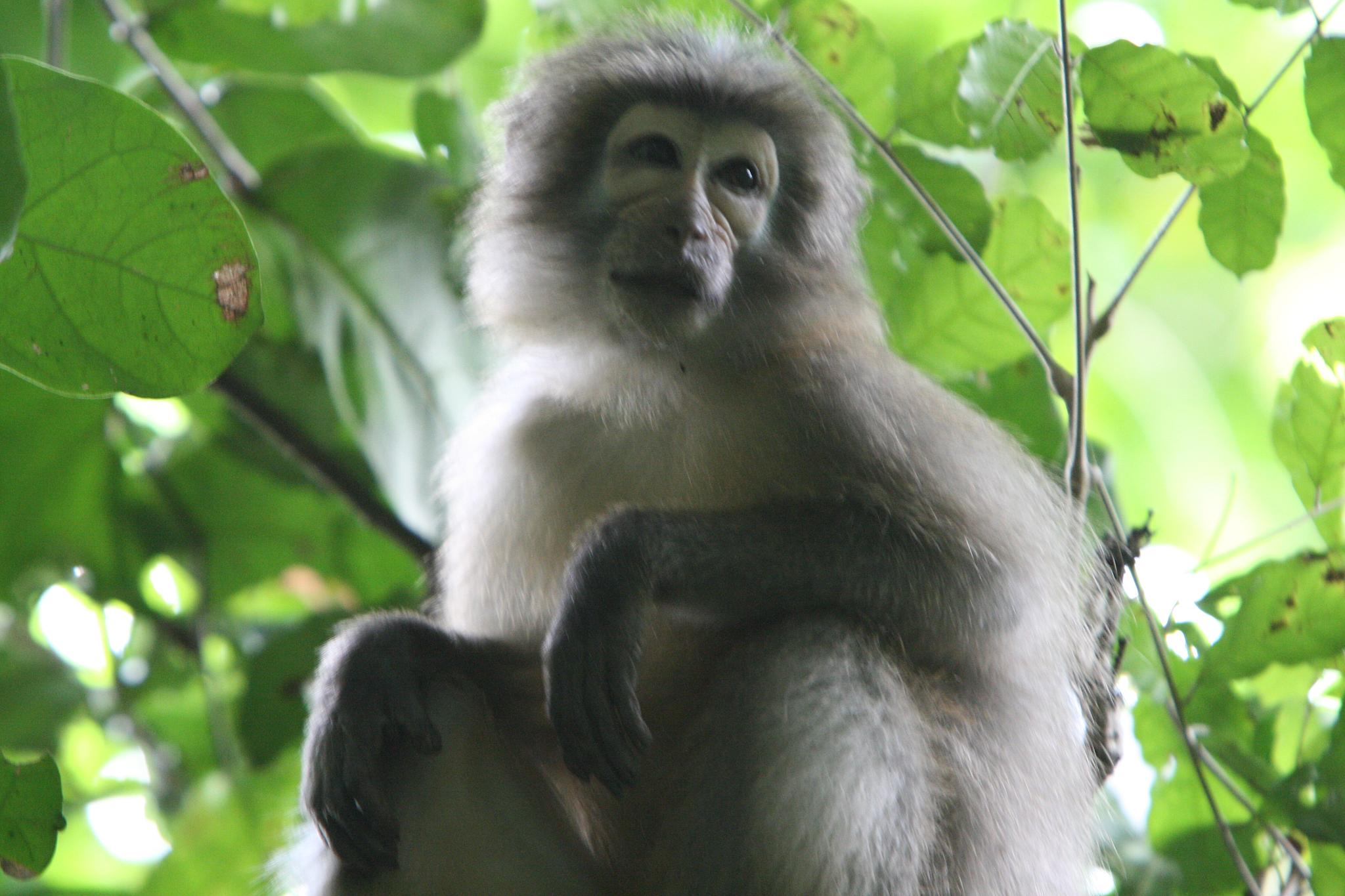

Conservation status
- Endangered (IUCN 3.1)

Scientific classification
- Kingdom: Animalia
- Phylum: Chordata
- Class: Mammalia
- Infraclass: Placentalia
- Order: Primates
- Family: Cercopithecidae
- Genus: Cercocebus
- Species: C. sanjei

Binomial name
- Cercocebus sanjei Mittermeier, 1986
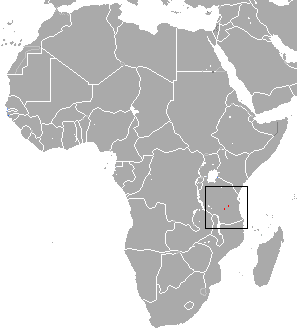
- Sanje mangabey range

= Sanje mangabey =

Species of Old World monkey

The Sanje mangabey (Cercocebus sanjei) is a highly endangered Old World monkey of the white-eyelid mangabey group from the Eastern Arc Mountains in Tanzania. They are about 50–65 centimetres (20–26 in) in length, excluding the tail, and their body colour is greyish. Fruit makes up about 70% of their diet. They live in valley forests and on mountain slopes, but are mostly ground-dwelling, which makes them susceptible to hunting and poaching. Their habitat is being degraded, and the International Union for Conservation of Nature has assessed their conservation status as being "endangered".

== History ==
In 1979, two conservationists were on a field trip in a remote forest in the Udzungwa Mountains in Tanzania when they heard the call of an animal that they recognised as being that of a mangabey, a monkey that was not previously known from these mountains. On investigating further, they found that an unknown species of mangabey was involved, the first new species of primate to be discovered in East Africa for many years. The species was described in 1986 by the American primatologist Russell Mittermeier, who gave it the name Cercocebus sanjei.

== Description ==
The Sanje mangabey is a medium-sized monkey; the sexes are similar in appearance but males are slightly larger than females. They are about 50–65 centimetres (20–26 in) long, excluding tail, and weigh about 7–9 kilograms (15–20 lb). The snout is grey while the skin on the rest of the face is pinkish or greyish, with a pale bluish border at the hairline, The eyelids and area under the eyes are particularly pale. The hair on the crown is longer than elsewhere and tends to have a parting or small whorl. Hairs on the crown and widow's peak have blackish bases and greyish-brown shafts. Hairs on the back, flanks and limbs have creamy grey bases and darker grey shafts, tipped with bands of yellowish-orange and black. The hairs on the underparts are long and pale yellowish-orange. The ends of the limbs and the hands and feet are dark grey. The bare area of skin under the tail is bluish-grey tinged with pink, and the ischial callosities are pink. The long, grey tail has a tuft of longer hairs at the tip.

== Distribution and habitat ==
This mangabey is endemic to East Africa, and only occurs in two forests in the Udzungwa Mountains of south-central Tanzania. Although it is known from areas with altitudes of from 300 to 1,800 m (1,000 to 5,900 ft), it is most common in mid-altitude evergreen forests, and mosaic woodland with mixed semi-deciduous and evergreen trees. It sometimes occurs in low altitude miombo woodland with Brachystegia species, and has been known to invade cropland. It frequents forested valley bottoms near watercourses, and also dry, more open slopes with scattered trees, bracken and Rubus species.

== Ecology ==
The Sanje mangabey is a diurnal species and spends around half its time on the ground, and the rest foraging in the upper and middle canopy, and the understory. Troops of mangabeys occupy a home range, and spend the night in one of about eight clumps of tall trees that are habitually used for sleeping. A loud "whoop-gabble" call is often emitted in the morning from these trees before the troop moves off to forage. Some of their time is spent on the ground hunting among the leaf litter for fallen fruits, seeds and nuts, ants and other invertebrates, roots and fungi, and some time in the canopy feeding on fruits and seeds. Figs, the stones of Parinari excelsa and other large or hard items are often stored in cheek pouches, being cracked open later with the help of strong premolar teeth.

== Status ==
The Sanje mangabey has a very limited total area of occurrence and has two widely separated sub-populations. Its forest habitat is under threat from deforestation and charcoal manufacture, and the animal is hunted for food and for the pet trade, with traps being set in the forest and the meat being on sale in local villages. The number of mature individuals is declining and the monkey is particularly vulnerable because of its semi-terrestrial habits. In 2005, it was estimated that there might be about 1300 individuals in total. For these reasons, the International Union for Conservation of Nature has assessed its conservation status as being "endangered".
