= Omaha's Henry Doorly Zoo and Aquarium =

Zoo and aquarium in Omaha, Nebraska, US

- Interactive map of Omaha's Henry Doorly; Zoo and Aquarium
- 41.224703°N 95.928701°W
- Date opened: 1894 as Riverview Park Zoo
- Location: Omaha, Nebraska, United States
- Land area: Over 130 acres (53 ha)
- No. of animals: 9,000
- No. of species: 962
- Annual visitors: 2+ million
- Memberships: AZA, WAZA
- Major exhibits: Lied Jungle, Desert Dome, Mahoney Kingdoms of the Night, Suzanne and Scott Aquarium, Berniece Grewcock Butterfly and Insect Pavilion, Hubbard Gorilla Valley, Hubbard Orangutan Forest, Scott African Grasslands, Asian Highlands, and Owen Sea Lion Shores.
- Public transit: Metro Transit
- Website: www.omahazoo.com

Omaha's Henry Doorly Zoo and Aquarium is a zoo in Omaha, Nebraska. It is accredited by the Association of Zoos and Aquariums and a member of the World Association of Zoos and Aquariums. In August 2014, TripAdvisor rated it the "world's best zoo", ahead of the San Diego Zoo and Loro Parque, based on an algorithmic assimilation of millions of reviews for 275 major zoos worldwide.

The zoo is known for its leadership in animal conservation and research. Evolving from the public Riverview Park Zoo established in 1894, today the zoo includes several notable exhibits. "Kingdoms of the Night" is the world's largest nocturnal exhibit and indoor swamp, the "Lied Jungle" is one of the world's largest indoor rainforests, and the "Desert Dome" is one of the world's largest indoor deserts, as well as the largest glazed geodesic dome.

The zoo's mission includes four pillars—conservation, research, recreation, and education—which are represented by the four squares in the logo.

== History ==
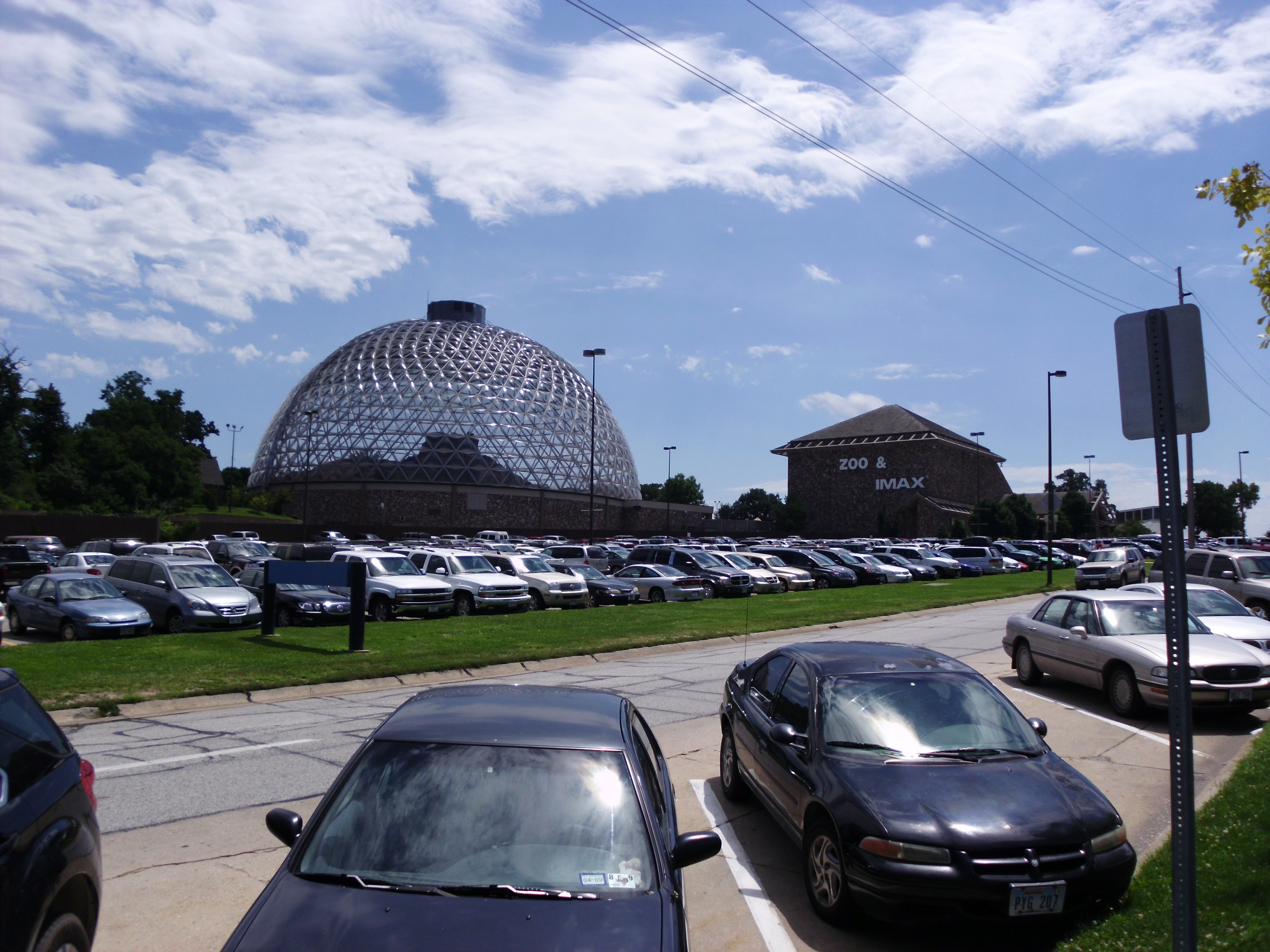
The desert dome, Imax building, and parking area at Henry Doorly Zoo and Aquarium

In 1894, the first animals were exhibited here under the name Riverview Park Zoo. By 1898, the collection had grown to over 120 animals. The Omaha Zoological Society was founded in 1952 to organize the long-term efforts of the zoo. The name was changed to Omaha's Henry Doorly Zoo & Aquarium in 1963, after a $750,000 donation from Margaret Hitchcock Doorly. This was given with the stipulation that the zoo be renamed in memory of her late husband Henry Doorly, who had an influential career as the chairman of the World Publishing Company. In addition to the World Publishing Company, the zoo soon connected with another notable Omaha business: Union Pacific. Union Pacific helped the zoo lay down 2.5 mi (4.0 km) of track in 1968 and the inaugural run of the Omaha Zoo Railroad was made on July 22, 1968.

The zoo has two rides that circumnavigate the property (tram and train): a carousel and the Skyfari, an aerial tram which opened in 2009 and takes visitors from the Butterfly and Insect Pavilion to the lion viewing exhibit.

The zoo is adjacent to the former site of Rosenblatt Stadium. In 2011, the zoo began developing the land at the stadium to become the new parking area and visitor center, leaving a small memorial at the location of home plate. Rosenblatt was replaced by the Charles Schwab Field Omaha downtown.

=== Zoo timeline ===
- 1894: Riverview Park opened.
- 1898: The park had a varied animal population of over 200 animals.
- 1920s: Gould Dietz donated cat cages.
- 1930s: The WPA built cat and bear exhibits.
- 1952: The Omaha Zoological Society was organized for the improvement and administration of the zoo.
- 1963: Margaret Hitchcock Doorly donated $750,000 to the zoo with the stipulation that the zoo be named after her late husband, Henry Doorly.
- 1965: The Omaha Zoological Society was reorganized as a nonprofit organization, and the first phase of the zoo, which included bear grottos, gorilla and orangutan buildings, and Ak-sar-ben Nature Kingdom, was dedicated.
- 1968: The inaugural run of Omaha Zoo Railroad was in July, and the Eugene C. Eppley Pachyderm Hill opened in November on the old baseball diamond site.
- 1972: The Ak-Sar-Ben waterfall was constructed; in August, the Owen Sea Lion Pavilion opened, complete with a new concession building, public restrooms, and a gazebo where an old public swimming pool was located.
- 1973: Owen Swan Valley and the Primate Research Building were completed.
- 1974: A new diet kitchen and educational classrooms were completed.
- 1977: The Cat Complex was added.
- 1979: The hospital and nursery opened.
- 1981: The giraffe and hoofstock complex opened.
- 1983: The Lee G. Simmons Free-flight Aviary was completed.
- 1984: A 70,000-US-gallon (260,000 L; 58,000 imp gal) saltwater aquarium opened in what had been the museum.
- 1985: The gorilla and orangutan buildings were completely renovated and named in honor of the Owen family; Richard Simmons cut the ribbon.
- 1986: World-Herald Square was completed, and the First Tier Wolf Woods, maintenance building, and hay barn were relocated to the northeast.
- 1987: The Mutual of Omaha Wild Kingdom Pavilion, the visitor services area US West Plaza, and a new main entrance were finished.
- 1988: Construction began on the Lied Jungle, and the zoo was selected for the endangered black-footed ferret breeding program. The zoo's greenhouse was built near the maintenance shop.
- 1989: Durham Family's Bear Canyon was added; Doorly's Pride (a heroic bronze sculpture of a pride of 12 lions) was installed in the entry plaza area, and the zoo received the AAZPA Bean Award for its long-term gaur propagation efforts. The black-footed ferret building was constructed.
- 1990: Dairy World featuring a children's petting zoo, educational exhibits, and concession area, was added, and the world's first in vitro-fertilized tiger was born.
- 1991: The Birthday House for children's birthday parties and education classes was finished; the world's first artificially inseminated tiger was born at the zoo.
- 1992: The Lied Jungle opened on April 4, with the attached Durham's TreeTops Restaurant and Education Center. Simmons Plaza near the main entrance was completed.
- 1993: The old aquarium was closed and construction of the new aquarium began. The zoo received two AAZPA awards: the Conservation Award for the black-footed ferret management program and the Significant Achievement Award for the Lied Jungle. The world's first artificially inseminated gaur calf was born.
- 1994: The Union Pacific Engine House for the Omaha Zoo Railroad was added.
- 1995: The Walter and Suzanne Scott Kingdoms of the Seas Aquarium was opened. The zoo had more than 1.6 million visitors, and land was acquired for an off-site breeding facility and drive-through park. Construction began on the IMAX 3D Theater, and the zoo participated in the propagation of the world's first in vitro gorilla birth (Timu was born at the Cincinnati Zoo).
- 1996: The Bill and Berniece Grewcock Center for Conservation and Research was completed, and Timu, the world's first in vitro gorilla moved to Omaha's zoo.
- 1997: The Lozier IMAX theater was finished.
- 1998: The Garden of the Senses, the Lee G. Simmons Conservation Park and Wildlife Safari (22 mi (35 km) west at Nebraska's I-80 Exit 426 near Ashland), and a new diet kitchen were completed, and construction began on a new pathology laboratory and keepers lounge.
- 1999: Sue's Carousel was added, construction began on the world's largest desert dome, and the zoo hosted a temporary Komodo dragon exhibit.
- 2000: The new North Entrance Plaza was completed, featuring a new gift shop, warehouse, entrance plaza, and visitor gazebo. The zoo joined the Okapi Species Survival Program, allowed it to be one of 14 zoos in North America to display rare okapi; a traveling koala exhibit visited the zoo.
- 2001: Cheetah Valley, and new bongo and tree kangaroo exhibits were constructed, and the zoo hosted a traveling white alligator exhibit.
- 2002: Desert Dome was finished, and construction began on Hubbard Gorilla Valley.
- 2003: Kingdoms of the Night, featuring various nocturnal habitats, opened beneath the Desert Dome.
- 2004: Hubbard Gorilla Valley was opened, and a tower with two high-capacity elevators were added to take visitors from the main level of the zoo near the Desert Dome down 44 ft. to Hubbard Gorilla Valley.
- 2005: The Hubbard Orangutan Forest opened in two phases in May and August; a giraffe feeding station opened in the spring; and construction began on an addition to the Grewcock Center for Conservation and Research.
- 2006: A new Guest Services building and two additional gates at the main entrance were added; the Hubbard Research wing expansion to the Grewcock Center for Conservation and Research opened in July; and the Budgie Encounter was finished.
- 2007: Mutual of Omaha's Wild Kingdom Pavilion was transformed into the Exploration Station, and construction on the Butterfly and Insect Pavilion began.
- 2008: The Berniece Grewcock Butterfly and Insect Pavilion opened; and construction on a Madagascar exhibit began.
- 2009: Skyfari, a chairlift connecting the Butterfly and Insect Pavilion to the old African rangeland exhibit area.
- 2010: Expedition Madagascar opened.
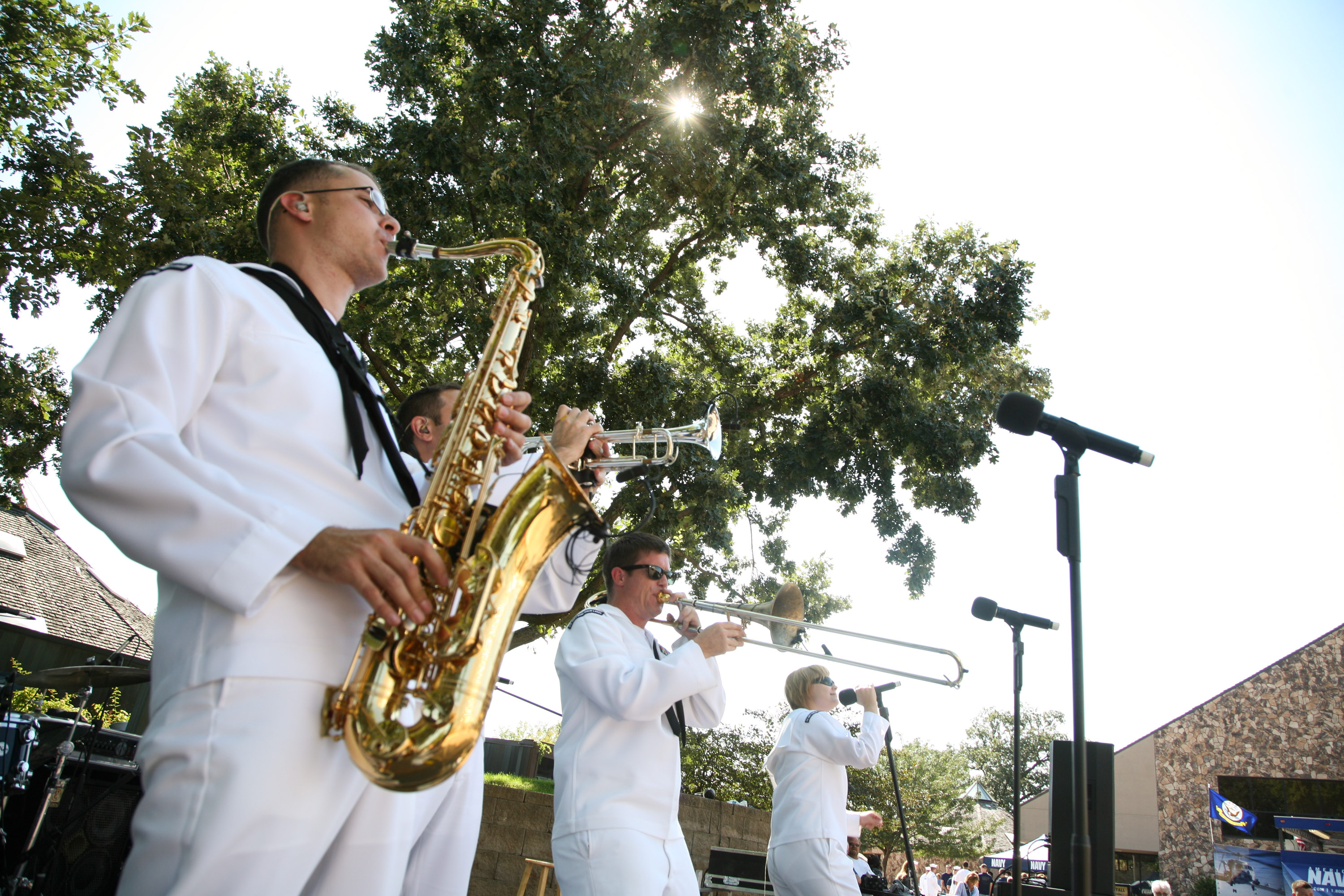
  U.S. Navy Band Great Lakes, Horizon performing at the zoo, 2011
- 2012: Scott Aquarium reopened after renovations, Rosenblatt Stadium demolished by the zoo, and the zoo renamed Omaha's Henry Doorly Zoo and Aquarium.
- 2013: A new gift shop opened, the IMAX facility was remodeled, and the Infield At The Zoo and Gateway to the Wild exhibits were completed.
- 2014: Stingray Beach opened to the public. The seasonal interactive exhibit, located by Sue's Carousel, allows visitors to touch and feed cownose, Atlantic and Southern stingrays. Camel rides, also located by Sue's Carousel, opened to the public. Construction on Omaha's Henry Doorly Zoo and Aquarium's largest project, the African Grasslands, begins."
- 2016: Six African elephants arrived at the zoo from Eswatini's Hlane Royal National Park to survive a drought on March 11. On May 27, African Grasslands opened after two years of construction. This, coupled with Memorial Day weekend, caused what local media dubbed "Zoopocalypse". Within two hours of opening the zoo saw over 8,000 visitors enter the main gates; a normal Sunday sees 4–5,000 people all day. Hours later, the entrance count was up to over 20,000 people.
- 2018: Bay Family Children's Adventure Trails opens.
- 2020: Owen Sea Lion Shores Attraction opened on September 4.
- 2021: Hubbard Gorilla Valley, Expedition: Madagascar and Hubbard Orangutan Forest underwent extensive renovations and reopened July 3.
- 2023: African bull elephant, Callee, transferred to the Sedgwick County Zoo in Wichita, Kansas, to breed with its female elephants. He joined them in late May.

== Major exhibits ==
=== African Grasslands ===
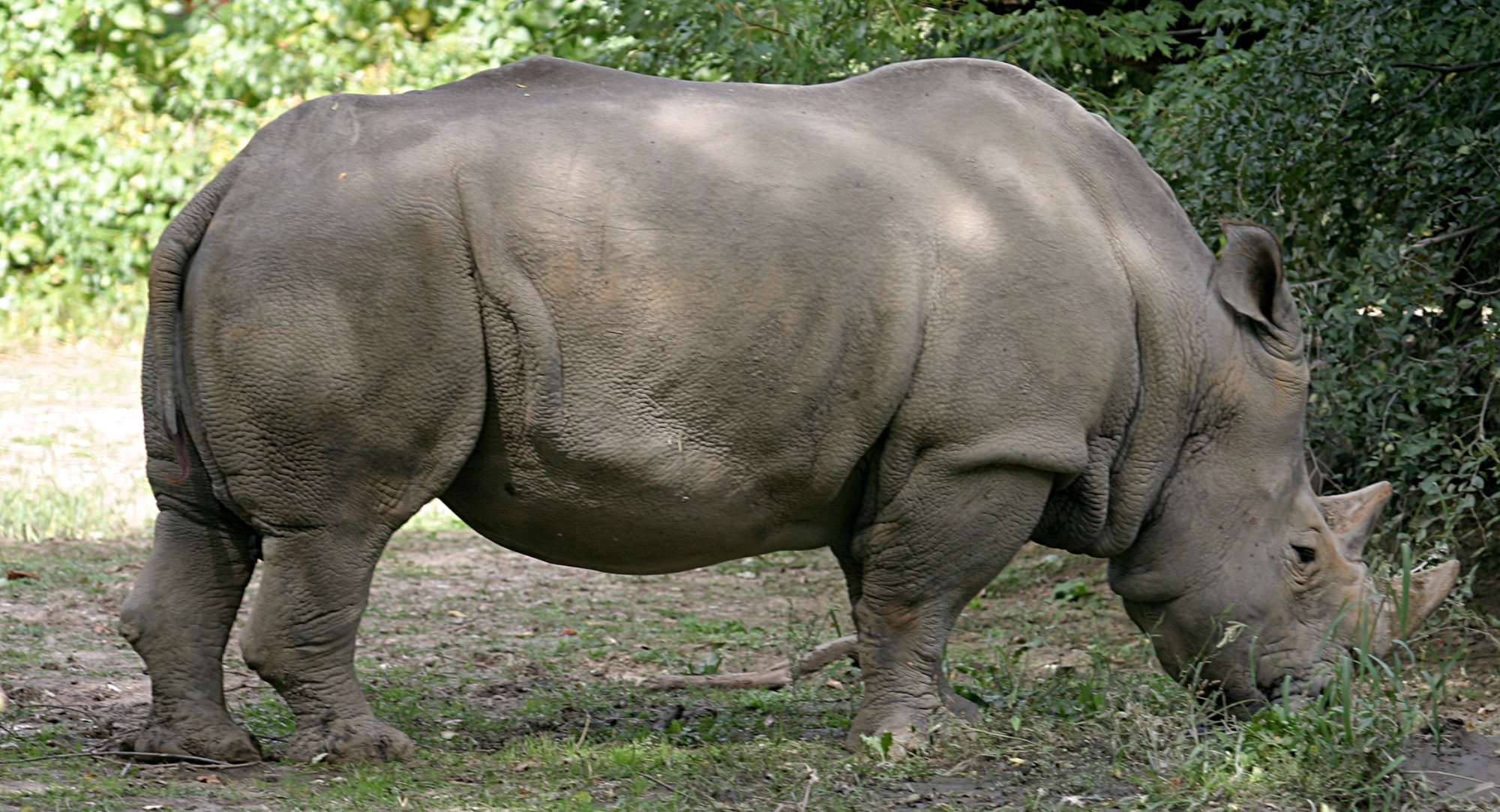
White rhinoceros at the zoo

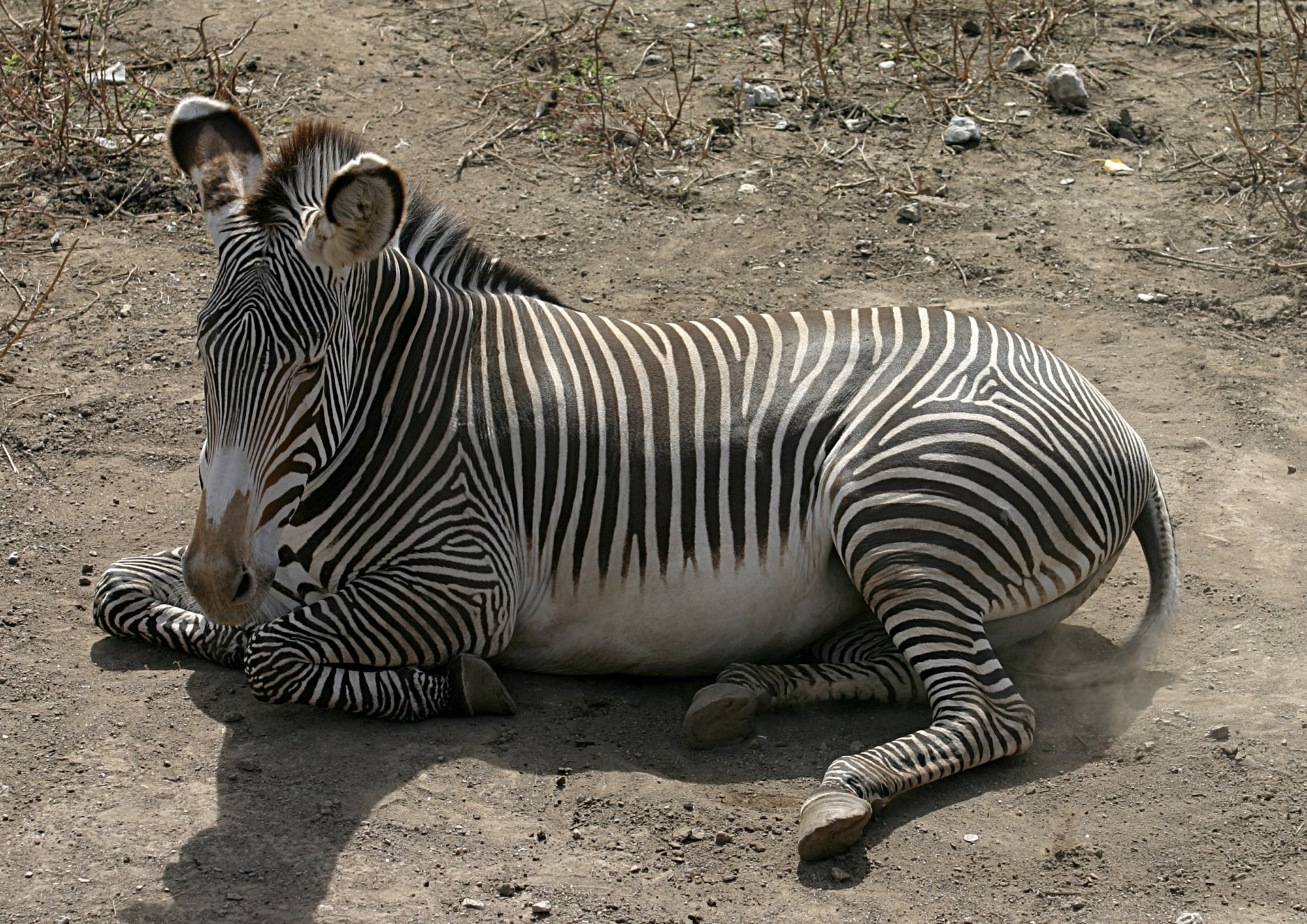
Grevy's zebra

After six years of planning and three years of construction, the 28-acre (11 ha), $73 million African Grasslands exhibit opened to the public May 27, 2016, over the zoo's former eastern boundary area and Pachyderm Hill exhibits.

In 2017, Warren the African elephant unexpectedly died. He was the only male of the six African elephants that arrived at the zoo from Eswatini. In May 2019, the Birmingham Zoo's male African bush elephant Callee joined the herd of five female elephants to breed with them. In January 2022, two baby elephants, Eugenia and Sonny, were born to two of the females, Kiki and Claire respectively. In March 2022, the zoo announced a third female was pregnant; Lolly would go on to give birth to a male calf in March 2023.

Species include:

- African bush elephant
- Reticulated giraffe
- Southern white rhinoceros
- Grant's zebra
- Ostrich
- Meerkat
- Klipspringer
- Rock hyrax
- White-throated monitor
- Crested guineafowl
- African pygmy goat
- Lion
- Cheetah
- Impala
- Lesser kudu
- Sable antelope
- Bongo
- Okapi
- Pink-backed pelican

=== Asian Highlands ===
A new exhibit built on previously undeveloped space, the Asian Highlands area is a $22 million, 8-acre (3.2 ha) recreation of the highlands of central Asia, including India and China, designed to simulate a mountain ascent, featuring species native to the region as well as a Yeti Camp, acting as a hub for visitors with themed food and gift options, and a Kid's Discovery Trail. The first phase of the exhibit opened in the spring of 2018 and the second phase opened in the spring of 2019. Species in the exhibit include:

- Indian rhinoceros
- Père David's deer
- Red panda
- White-naped crane
- Sichuan takin
- Chinese goral
- Chinese muntjac
- Tufted deer
- Sloth bear
- Snow leopard
- Siberian tiger

=== Butterfly and Insect Pavilion ===
The Berniece Grewcock Butterfly and Insect Pavilion opened in 2008. The Pavilion is a 14,000-square-foot (1,300 m^{2}) total-immersion exhibit located between the Scott Aquarium and the Giraffe Complex. Viewed from the sky, the exhibit resembles a winged insect. The building features several exhibits:

- Butterfly Conservatory: The 2,450-square-foot (228 m^{2}) area features 10-foot (3.0 m)-high glass sidewalls to allow the maximum amount of light inside the exhibit. Natural light, large trees, rocks, and water elements simulate a natural habitat and help stimulate natural butterfly behaviors.
- Conservation Promenade: Located in the Butterfly Conservatory, the promenade winds past waterfalls and over streams, through vegetation, and loops around the giant Amazon water lily pool. The pool features a stilt root tree supporting a floating walkway through the roots for a close view of the giant South American water lilies. Species of butterflies and moths include the blue Morpho, zebra longwing, and painted ladies. Microhabitats are displayed along the Conservation Promenade featuring endangered amphibians the Zoo is currently working with in response to the global amphibian crisis. Visitors must stop in a mirrored room to check for butterflies before exiting.
- Chrysalis Hatching Room: A 220-square-foot (20 m^{2}) area where butterflies and moths in their chrysalis or cocoon stage will be brought in from all over the world. Inside, they are carefully hung in hatching chambers where visitors can watch them complete their metamorphosis. The 510-square-foot (47 m^{2}) entry hallway leading into the insect wing contains several displays, such as a locust colony and a Halloween moon crab, along with interactive learning opportunities.
- Insect Zoo: This 2,413-square-foot (224.2 m^{2}) area has a 5-foot (1.5 m) high glass sidewall on top of a 7-foot (2.1 m) solid wall to allow more intensive exhibit work. Individual micro-habitats are home to ants, spiders, scorpions, walking sticks, mantids, centipedes, roaches, beetles and other animals. In the center of this room, two bird exhibits house other exotic species such as tropical hummingbirds.
- Lower Level: Features two rooms, approximately 1,085-square-foot (100.8 m^{2}), used for rearing butterflies and culturing insect colonies. Another 542-square-foot (50.4 m^{2}) room is used to maintain plants that are being rotated through the butterfly display. A 1,161-square-foot (107.9 m^{2}) frog breeding and rearing facility houses the most threatened amphibians. The rooms can be viewed through windows from the Giraffe Observation Walk that circles the building and allow Zoo visitors a look behind the scenes. This same path has numerous native butterfly gardens.

=== Desert Dome ===
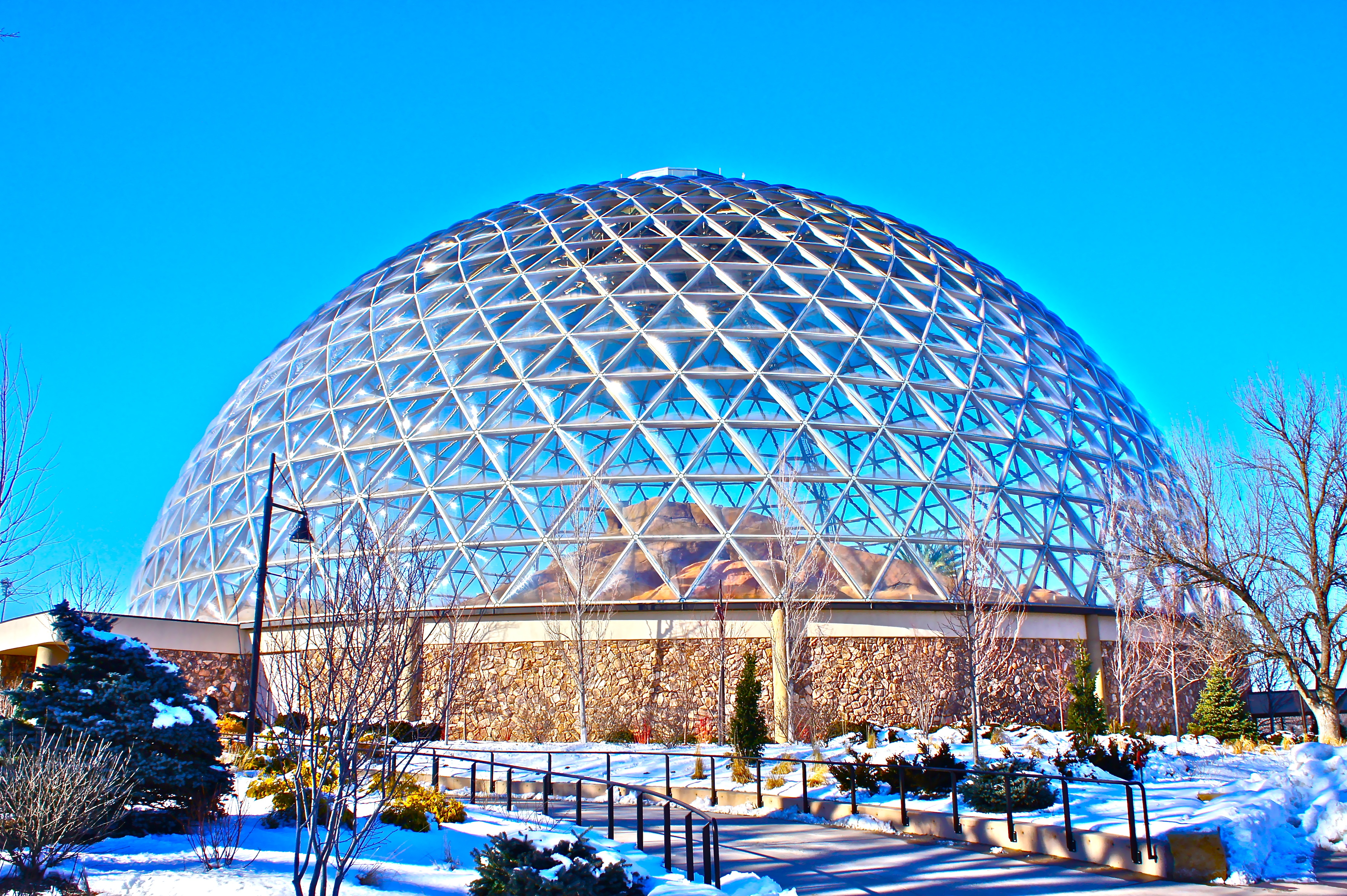
The exterior of the Desert Dome during the winter season

The Desert Dome opened in April 2002 at a cost of $31.5 million (includes Kingdoms of the Night). It is one of the world's largest indoor deserts at around 42,000 ft^{2} (0.96 acres; 3,900 m^{2}). Beneath the Desert Dome is the Kingdoms of the Night, and both levels make up a combined total of 84,000 sq ft (1.9 acres; 7,800 m^{2}). The Desert Dome has geologic features from deserts around the world: Namib Desert of southern Africa, Red Center of Australia, and the Sonoran Desert of the southwest United States. the Desert dome lobby went for a mini remodeling from May 12, 2014 to July 19, 2014.

Animals include:

- African wild cat
- Bat-eared fox
- Common dwarf mongoose
- Klipspringer
- Spotted thick-knee
- Black mamba
- Common giant ground gecko
- Cape cobra
- Inland taipan
- Rough-scaled death adder
- Lace monitor
- Rough-scaled python
- Perentie
- Bobcat
- Burrowing owl
- Collared peccary
- Gambel's quail
- Greater roadrunner
- Ocelot
- Swift fox
- Turkey vulture
- White-nosed coati
- Arizona black rattlesnake
- Santa Catalina rattlesnake
- Sidewinder
- Mexican beaded lizard
- Laughing kookaburra
- Tawny frogmouth

In addition to being one of the world's largest indoor deserts, the Desert Dome's geodesic dome is also the largest 'glazed' geodesic dome. The dome is 137 ft (42 m) above the main level and 230 ft (70 m) in diameter. The 1,760 acrylic windows with four shades (some clear) were placed to allow maximum shade in the summer and maximum light in the winter to reduce energy costs.

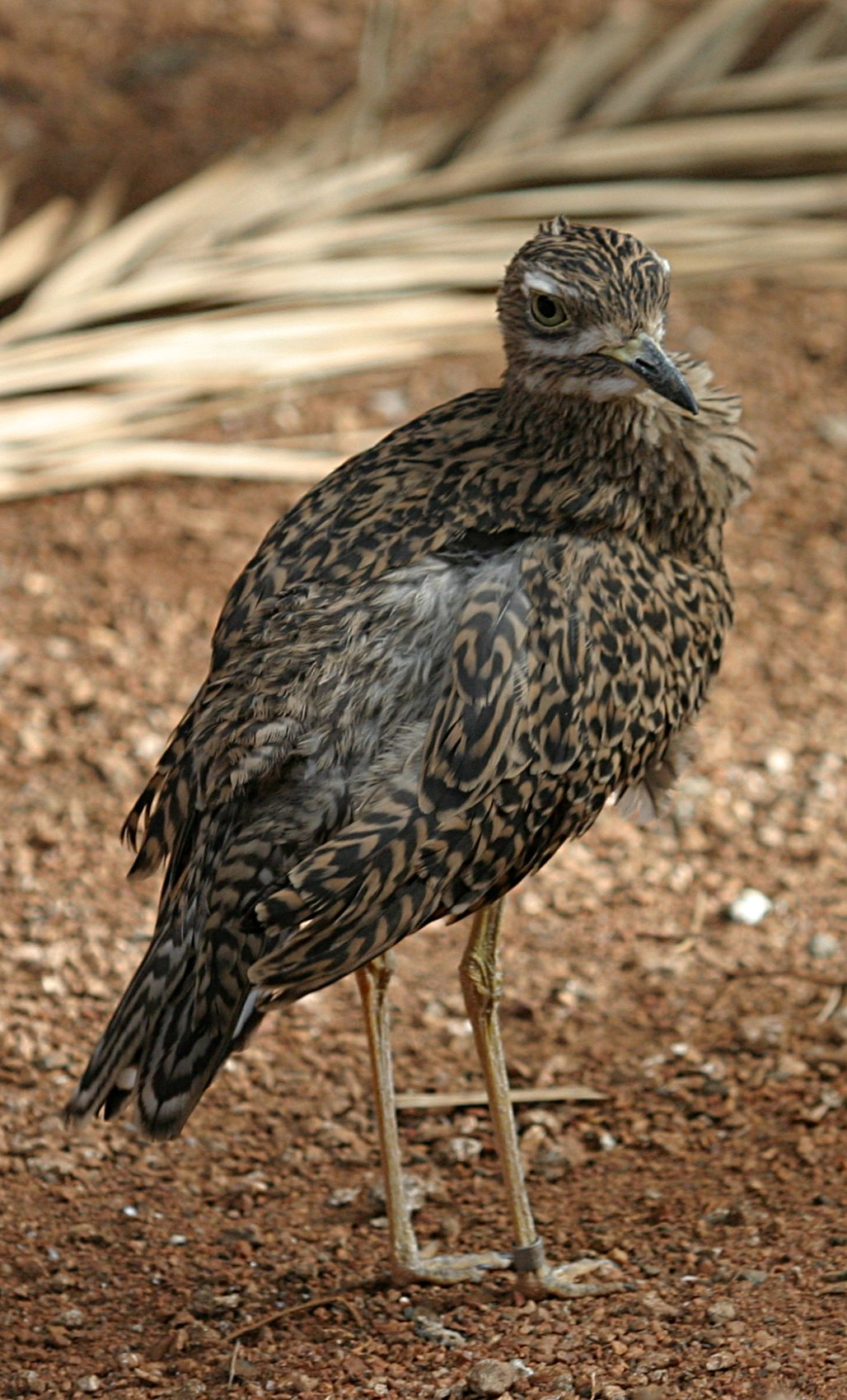
Cape thick-knee

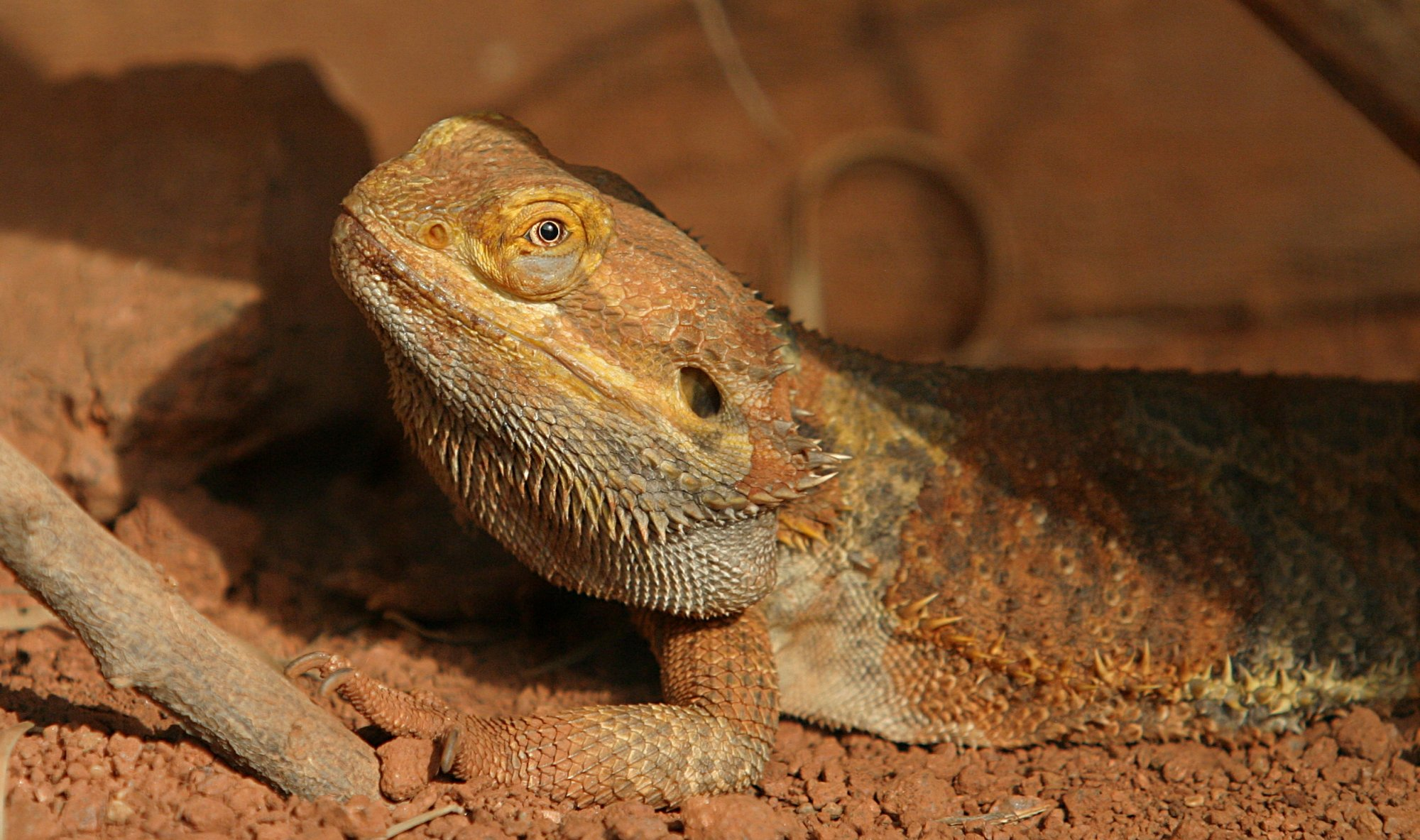
Central bearded dragon

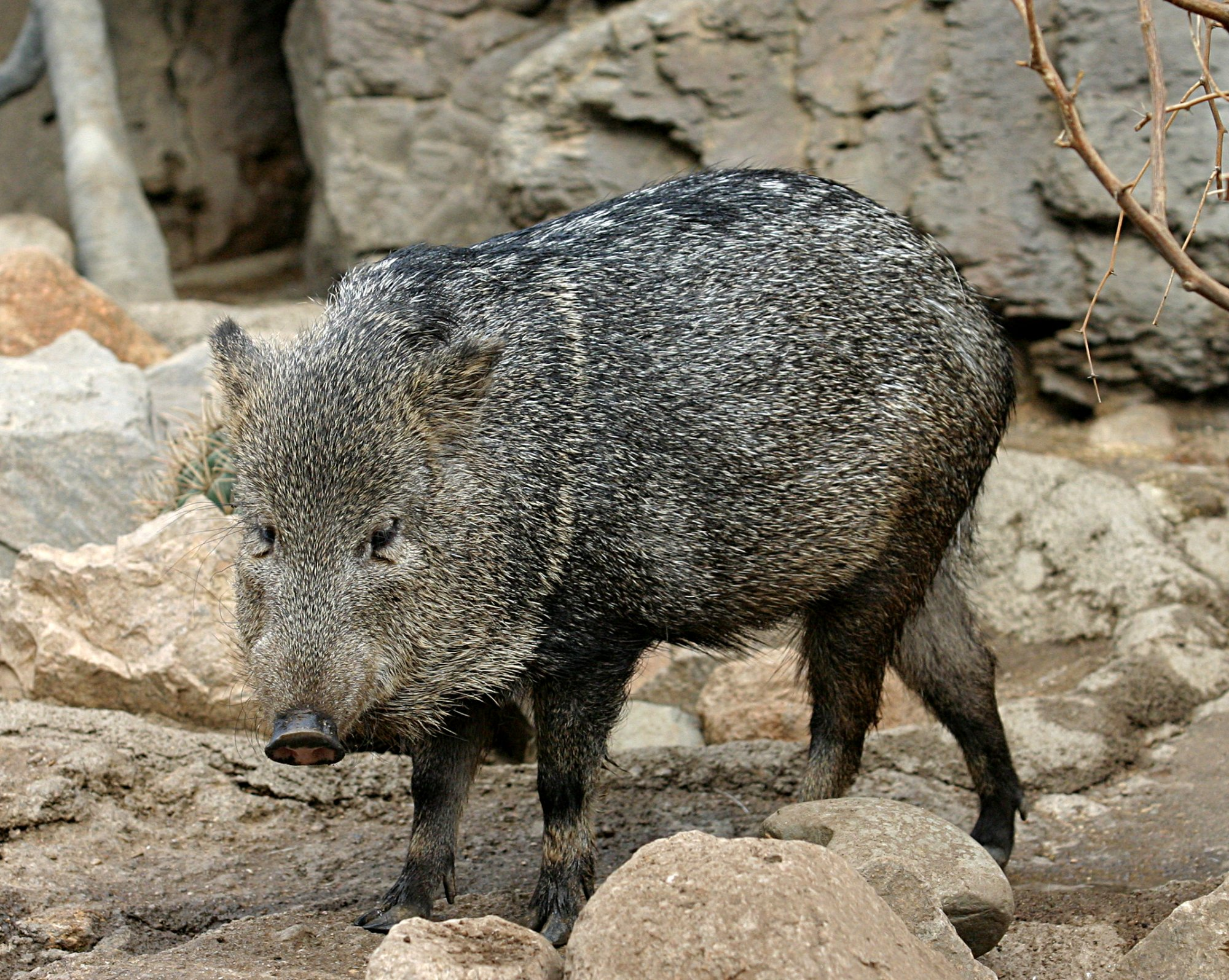
Collared peccary

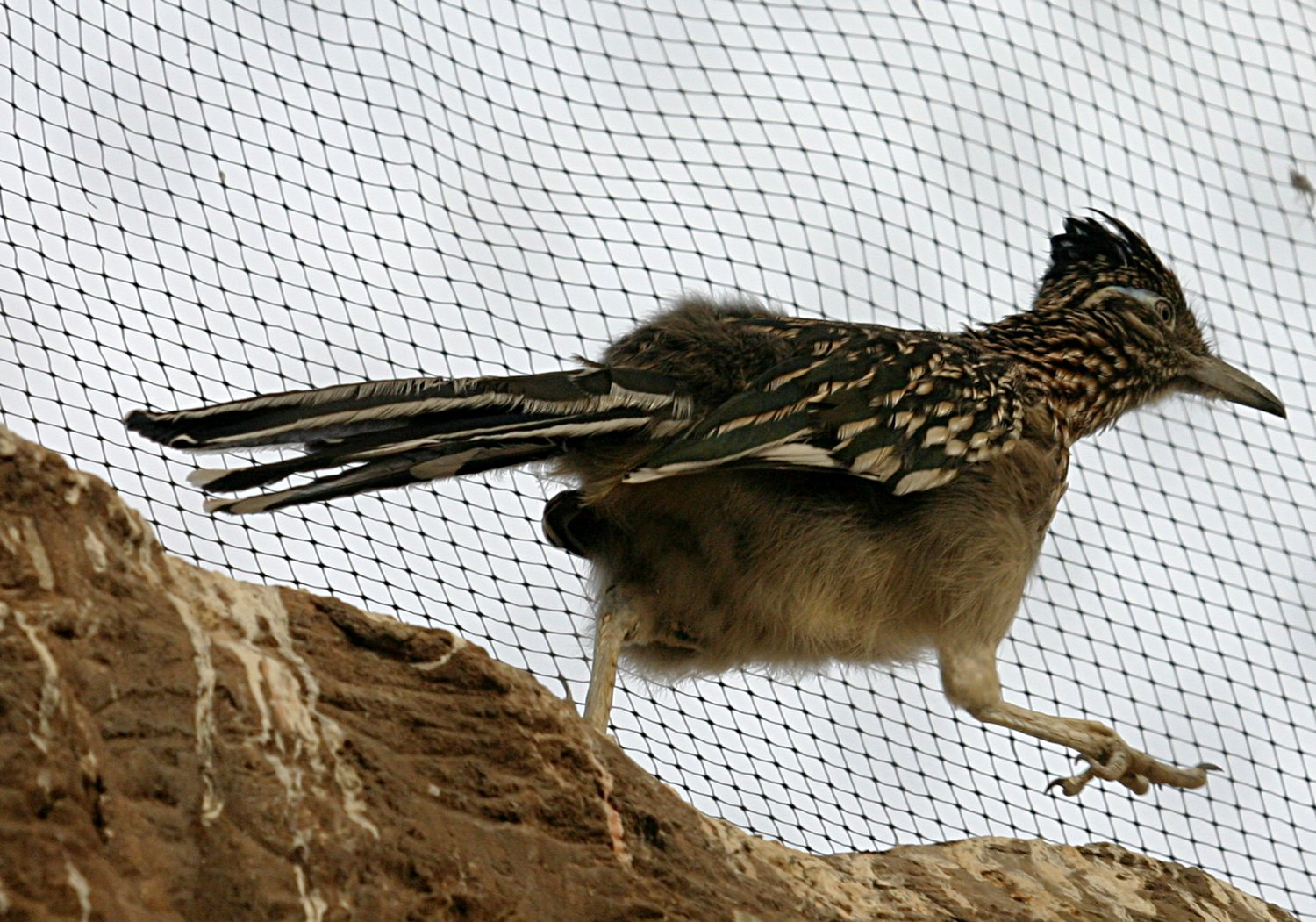
Greater roadrunner

=== Expedition Madagascar ===
Expedition Madagascar opened May 7, 2010, and has many animals including lemurs, straw-coloured fruit bats, and giant jumping rats. The building allows visitors to learn about Madagascar, an area considered one of the top hotspots for biodiversity because it is home to the largest number of endemic plant and animal species. Each exhibit is linked to ongoing projects in Madagascar and conservation efforts that the zoo's Madagascar Biodiversity Partnership has been active in since 1998. It underwent extensive renovations in 2021 during a closure due to the COVID-19 pandemic, and reopened in July 2021. Animals in the exhibit include:

- Ring-tailed lemur
- Red ruffed lemur
- Black-and-white ruffed lemur
- Grey mouse lemur
- Mongoose lemur
- Aye-aye
- Collared lemur
- Common brown lemur
- Fossa
- Malagasy giant rat
- Radiated tortoise

=== Garden of the Senses ===
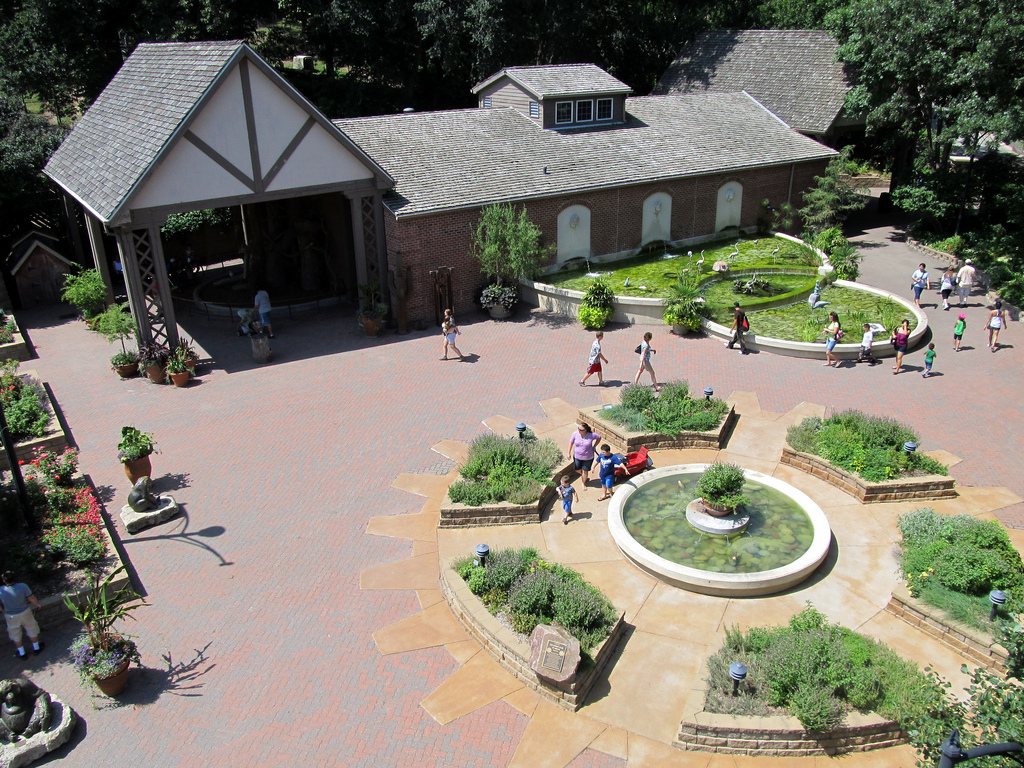
Garden of the Senses

The Garden of the Senses opened in spring 1998 at a cost of $1.8 million. The garden houses plants, fountains, birds, and a giant sundial. There are over 250 species of herbs, perennials trees, roses and other flowers, butterfly-friendly plants, and trellises. The birds include macaws, South American parrots, and Australian cockatoos.

=== Hubbard Gorilla Valley ===
The Hubbard Gorilla Valley is a gorilla exhibit named after Dr. Theodore Hubbard, a cardiologist from Omaha. It opened on April 8, 2004, at a cost of $14 million. Prior to being expanded and rebuilt, the Hubbard Gorilla Valley was the Owen Gorilla House. It underwent extensive renovations in 2021, while the exhibit was closed due to the COVID-19 pandemic, and reopened in July 2021.

Some of the animals included are:

- Western lowland gorilla
- Mantled guereza
- Wolf's mona monkey
- Diana monkey
- Abyssinian ground hornbill
- Yellow-backed duiker
- Black crowned crane
- Red River Hog
- Cattle egret
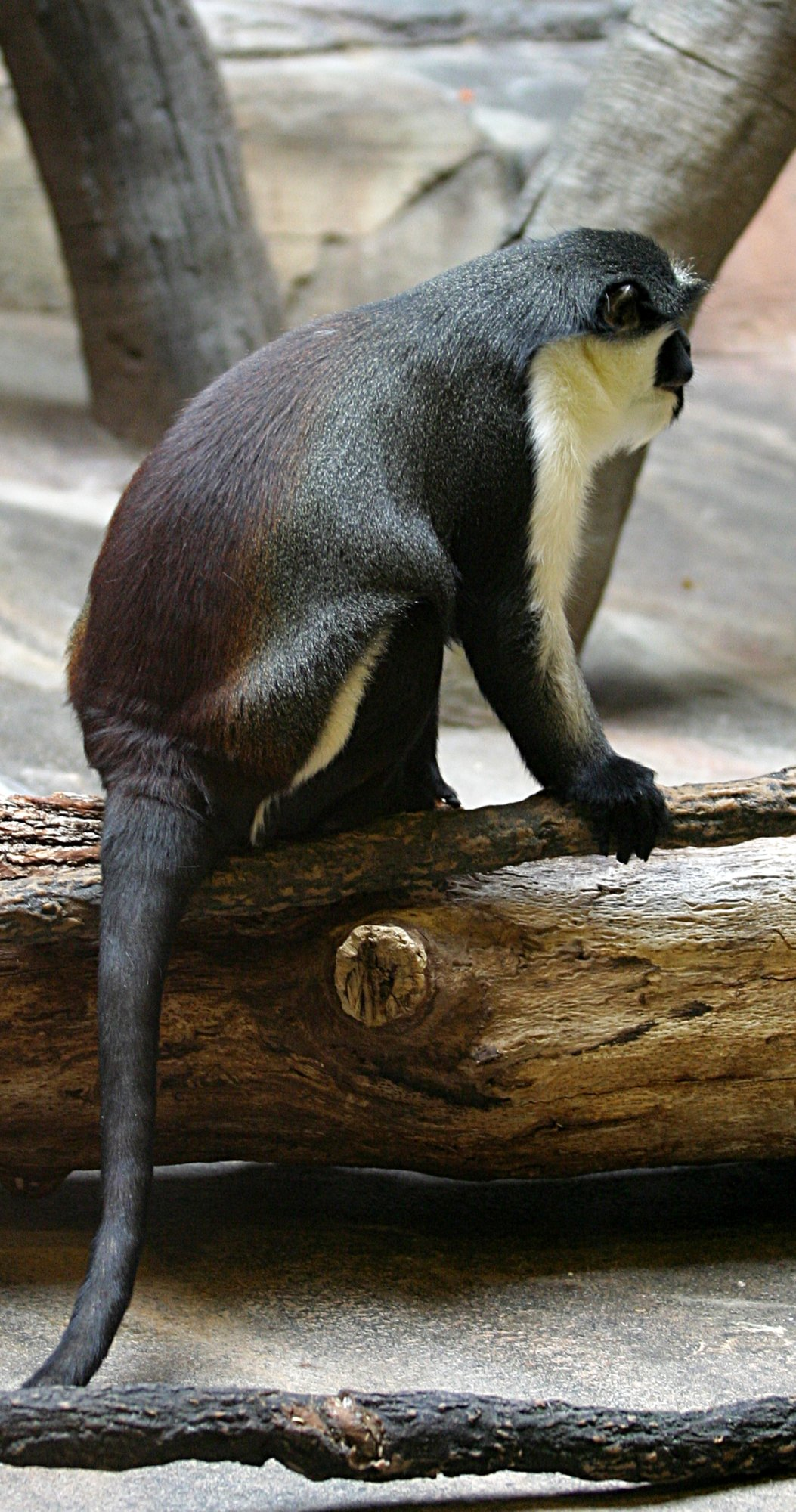
A Diana monkey

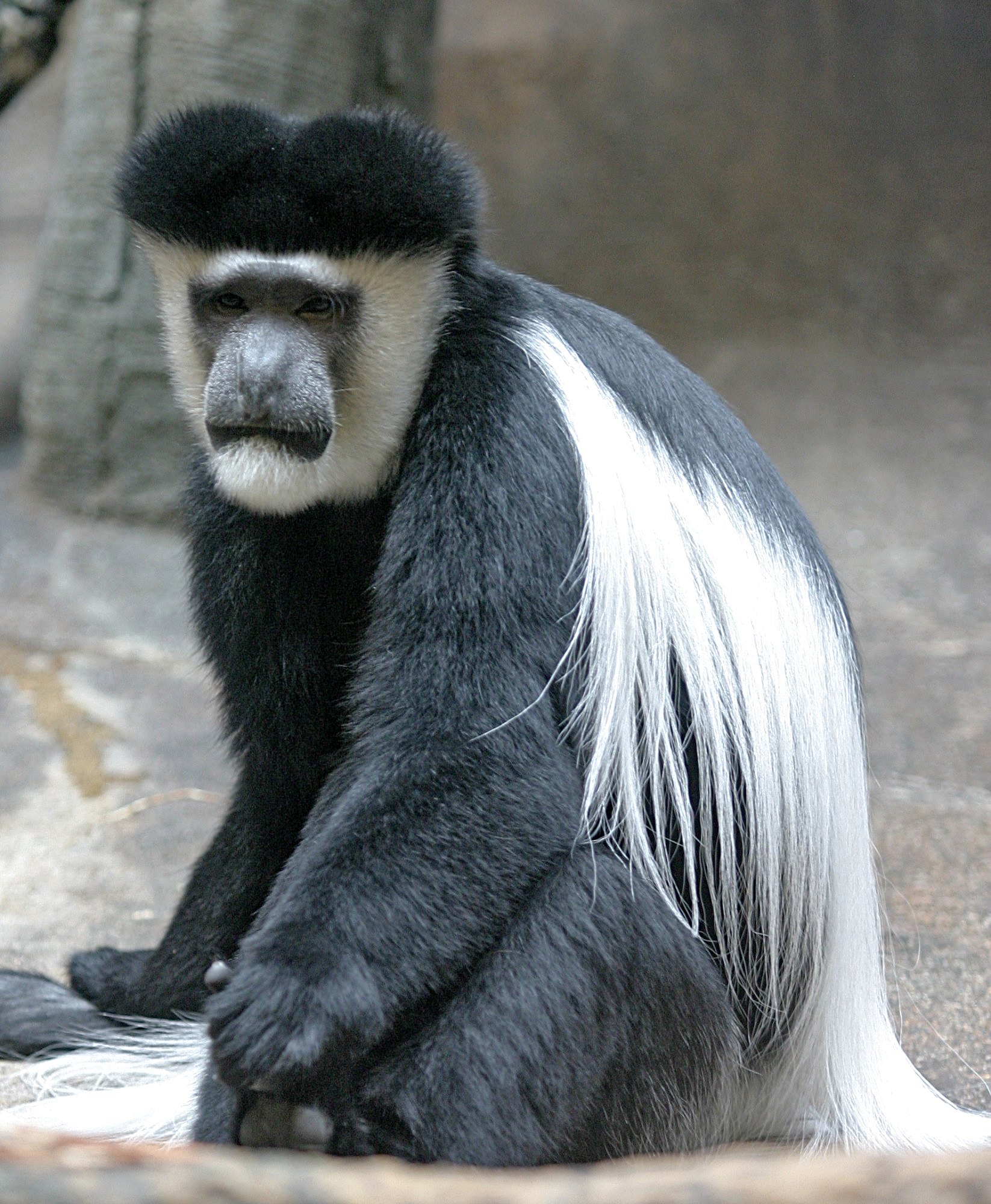
Mantled guereza

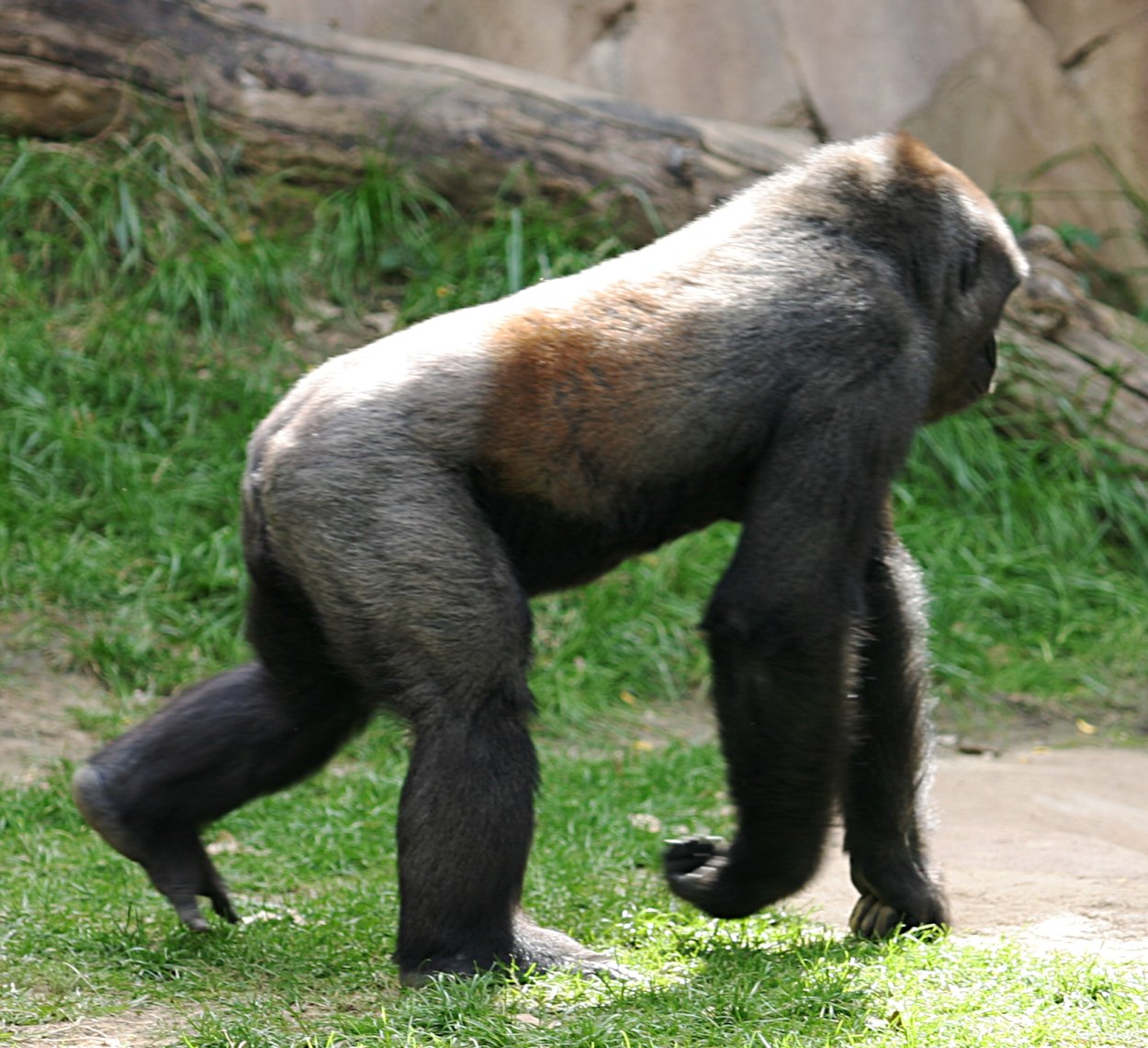
Western lowland gorilla

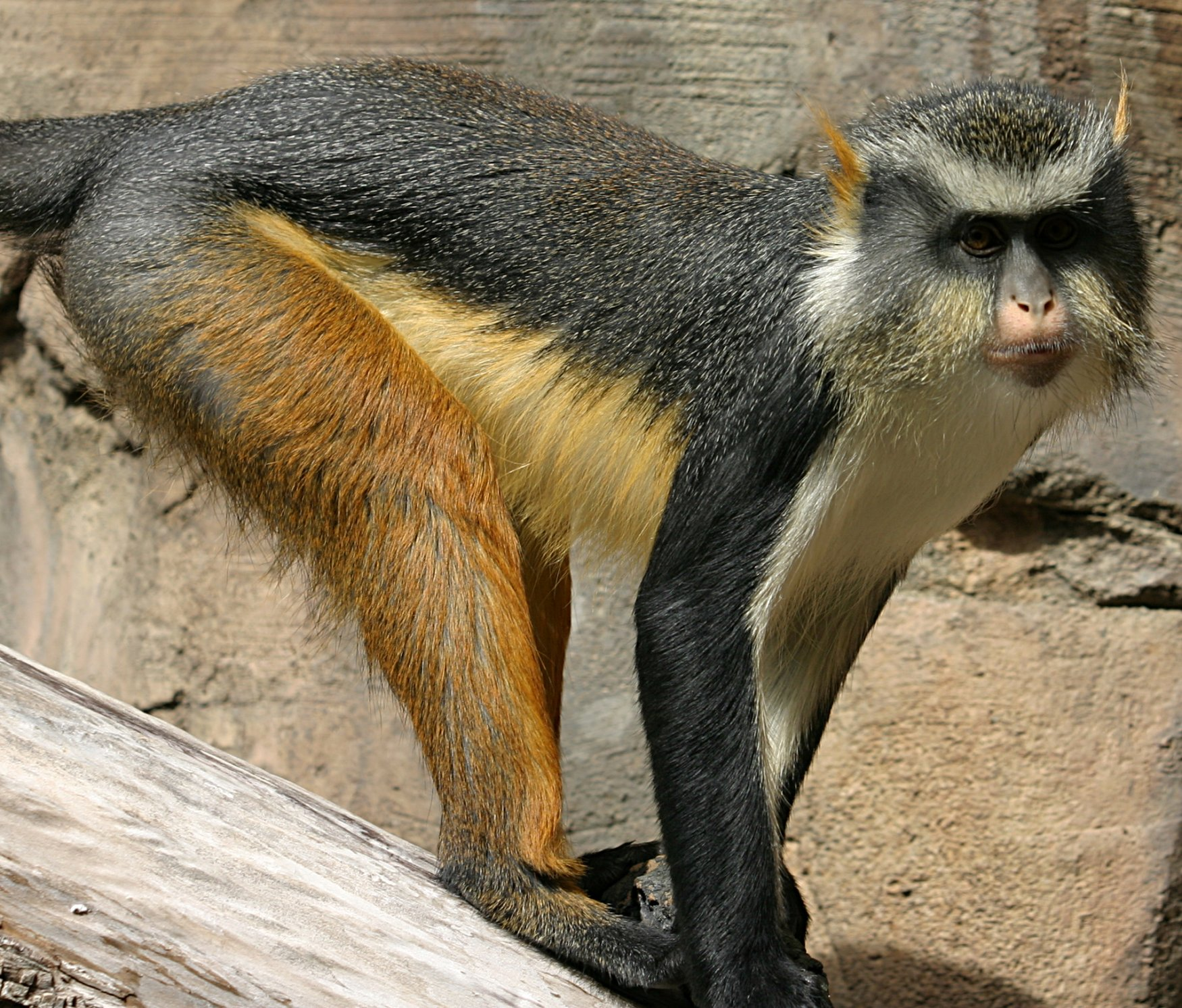
Wolf's mona monkey

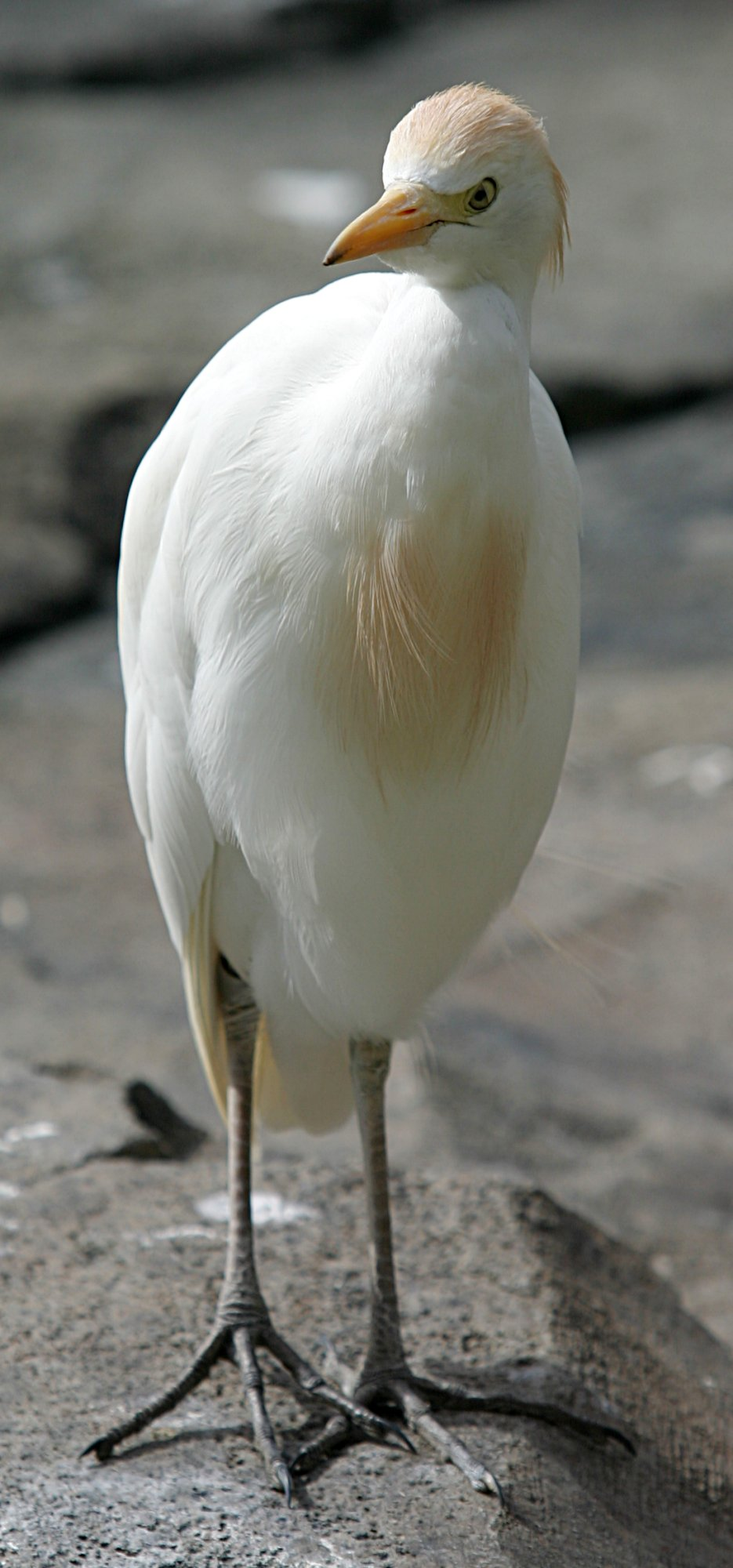
Cattle egret

=== Hubbard Orangutan Forest ===
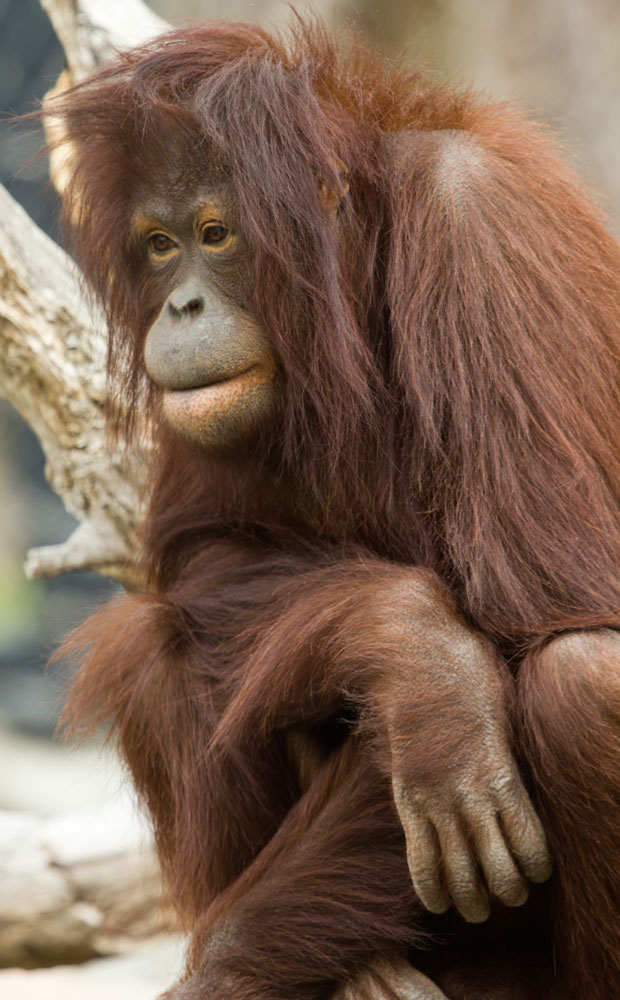
Orangutan at the zoo

The Hubbard Orangutan Forest opened in two phases during 2005; the first phase was opened in May, and the second phase opened in late summer at a cost of $8.5 million. The first phase is the outdoor habitat that includes two 65-foot (20 m)-tall, 100-short-ton (91-metric-ton) Banyan trees interconnected with vines enclosed by a stainless steel netting. Some of the artificial vines used in the enclosure are repurposed fire hoses. The exhibit underwent extensive renovations in early 2021, closing briefly due to the COVID-19 pandemic, before reopening in July 2021. A 20-foot (6.1 m) waterfall is named after Claire Hubbard, the Orangutan Forest's primary donor. The second phase, the indoor habitat has 3,126 ft^{2} (0.07 acres; 290 m^{2}) of floor space. The Hubbard Orangutan Forest recently underwent extensive renovations and fully re-opened in June 2024. The expansion includes an all-new indoor/outdoor siamang exhibit, an updated elevator building and plaza, a café, a walkway, and a seating area.

Animals in the exhibit include:

- Bornean orangutan
- François' langur
- Siamang

=== Suzanne and Walter Scott Aquarium ===
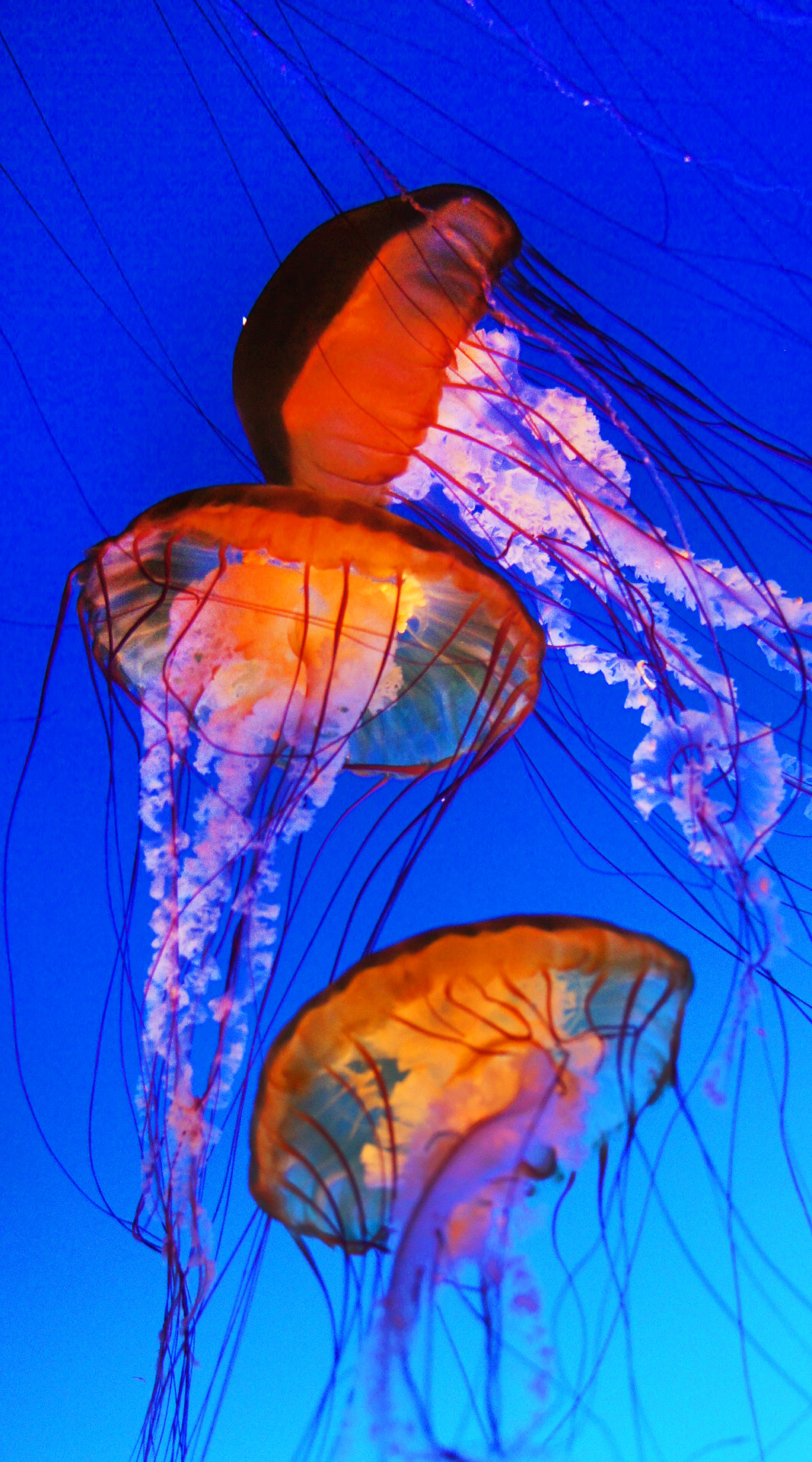
Sea Nettle Jellyfish, Scott Aquarium

The Walter and Suzanne Scott Aquarium, a public aquarium, opened on April 1, 1995, at a cost of $16 million. The building has 71,000 ft^{2} (6,600 m^{2}) and contains a total of 1,200,000 US gal (4,500,000 L; 1,000,000 imp gal) of water. The exhibit was first renovated in 2011, and opened again on April 5, 2012. It is one of the largest in-zoo aquariums in the world.

It features displays of aquatic habitats from polar regions, temperate oceans, the flooded Amazon rainforest, and coral reefs. The 450,000 US gal (1,700,000 L; 370,000 imp gal) shark tank features a 70 ft (21 m) shark tunnel at the bottom of the 17 ft (5.2 m)-deep tank. This tank features sharks, stingrays, sea turtles, and coral reef fish. An additional 450,000 US gal (1,700,000 L; 370,000 imp gal) is attached to the public portion and institutes a holding and quarantine tank. Other tanks include multiple species of jellyfish, a Giant pacific octopus, bonnet sharks, and open-ocean schooling fish. Another addition is a touch tank which allows visitors to feel the textures of various starfish, shells, and possibly a chain catshark or one of its empty eggs. The few freshwater displays featured include one of the Amazon rainforest, including fish, invertebrates, turtles, and a toucan; and one containing freshwater bee shrimp (Caridina sp.).

The aquarium features aquatic animals from around the world, including:

- Atlantic puffin
- Tufted puffin
- Southern rockhopper penguin
- King penguin
- Gentoo penguin
- Porcupinefish
- Moray eel
- Sharks
- Stingray
- Green sea turtle
- Loggerhead sea turtle
- Jellyfish
- Giant Pacific octopus
- Red-bellied piranha
- Toco toucan
- Giant gourami
- Pacu
- Redtail catfish
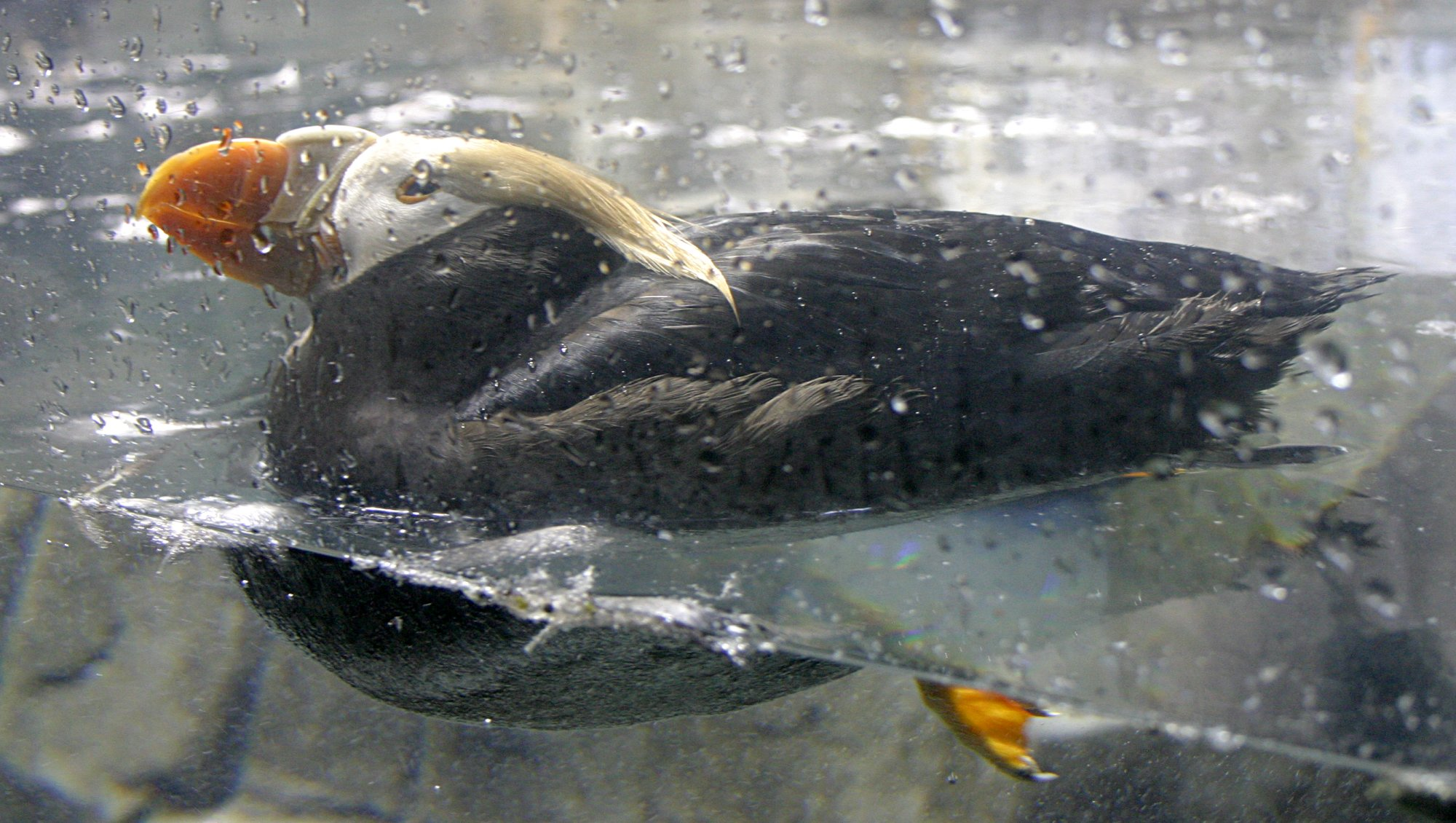
Tufted puffin

Gentoo penguins

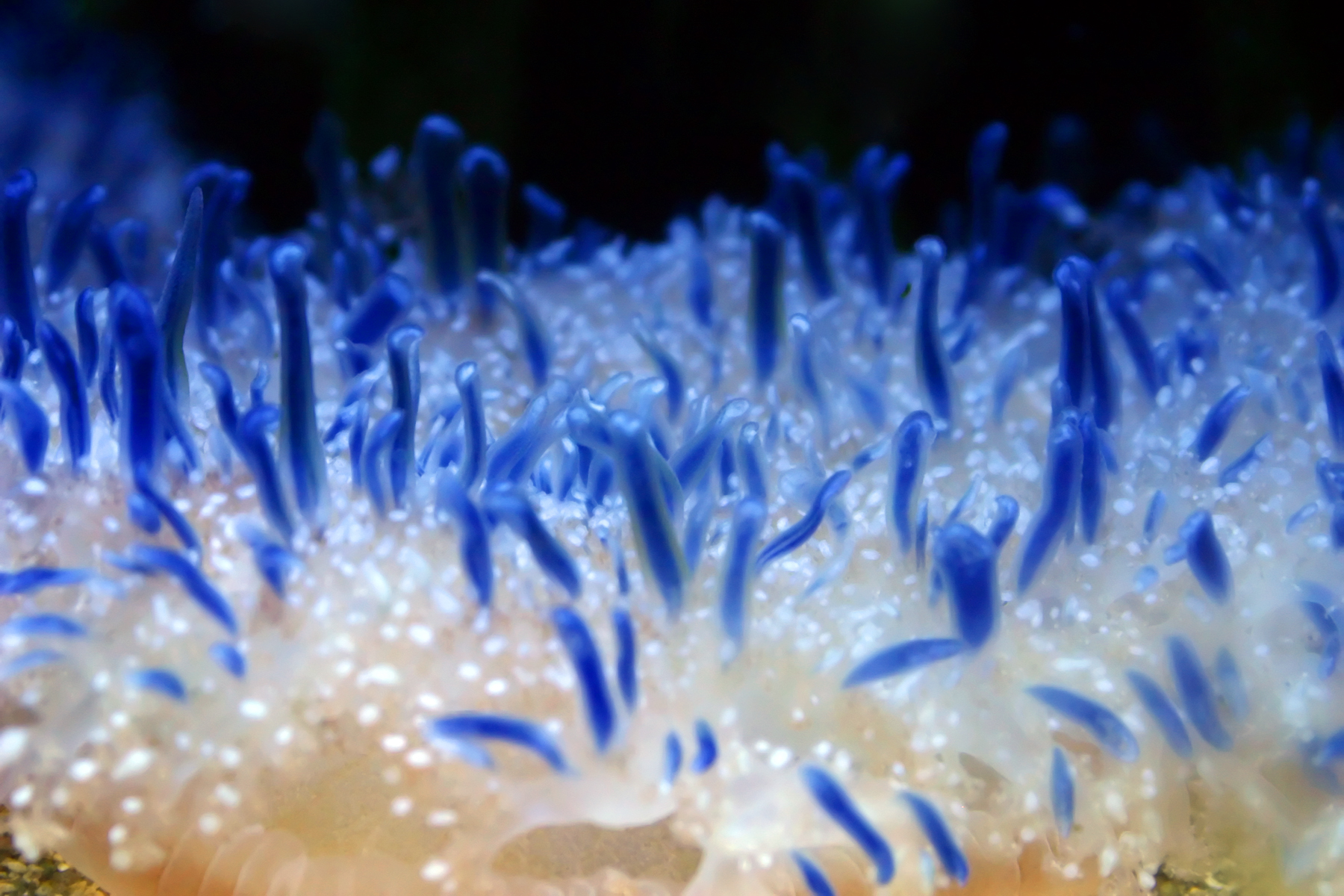
Cassiopea (upside-down jellyfish)

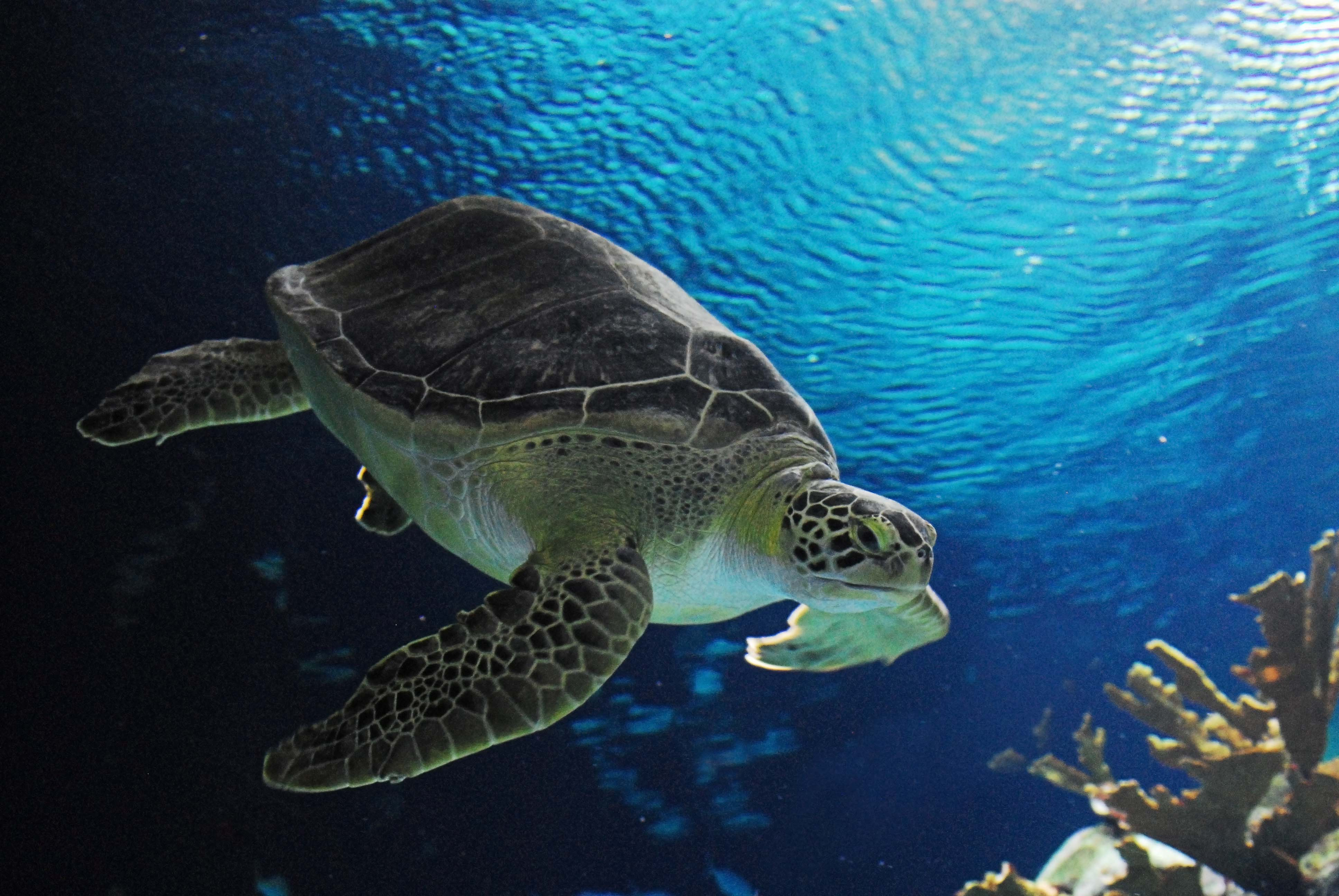
Sea turtle

=== Kingdoms of the Night ===
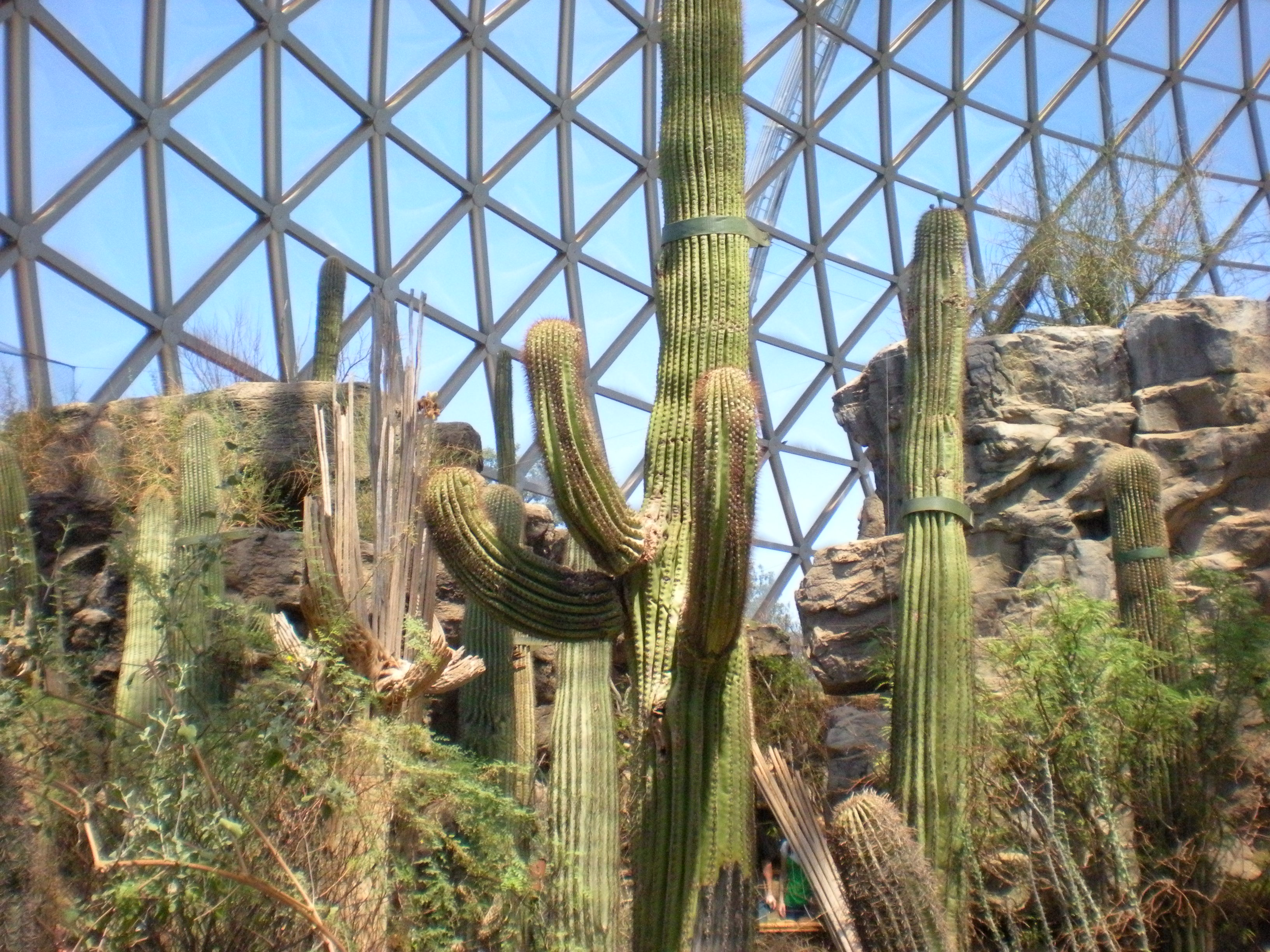
Inside the Desert Dome

The Eugene T. Mahoney Kingdoms of the Night opened beneath the Desert Dome in April 2003 at a cost of $31.5 million (includes Desert Dome). Kingdoms of the Night is the world's largest nocturnal animal exhibit at 42,000 ft^{2} (0.96 acres; 3,900 m^{2}). Both the Kingdoms of the Night and the Desert Dome combine to a total of 84,000 sq ft (1.9 acres; 7,800 m^{2}). The Kingdoms of the Night features a wet cave (with a 14 ft or 4.3 m deep aquarium), a canyon, an African diorama, a eucalyptus forest, a dry batcave, and a swamp. The swamp is also the world's largest indoor swamp. The Kingdoms of the night exploration cave at the entrance closed on May 12, 2014 for the remodeling of the new look of the exploration cave and it was completed in July 2014.

Some of the animals found at the Kingdom of the Night include:

- Fossa
- Aardvark
- African brush-tailed porcupine
- Naked mole-rat
- Common vampire bat
- Egyptian fruit bat
- Seba's short-tailed bat
- Greater bulldog bat
- Alligator snapping turtle
- American alligator, including a leucistic individual (one of less than 13 in the world)
- American crocodile
- North American beaver
- Freshwater crocodile
- Spectacled caiman
- American bullfrog
- Titicaca water frog
- Northern greater galago
- South African springhare
- Gray-handed night monkey
- Hoffmann's two-toed sloth
- Prehensile-tailed porcupine
- Nine-banded armadillo
- Southern three-banded armadillo
- Blind cave fish
- Short-beaked echidna
- Tammar wallaby

=== Lied Jungle ===
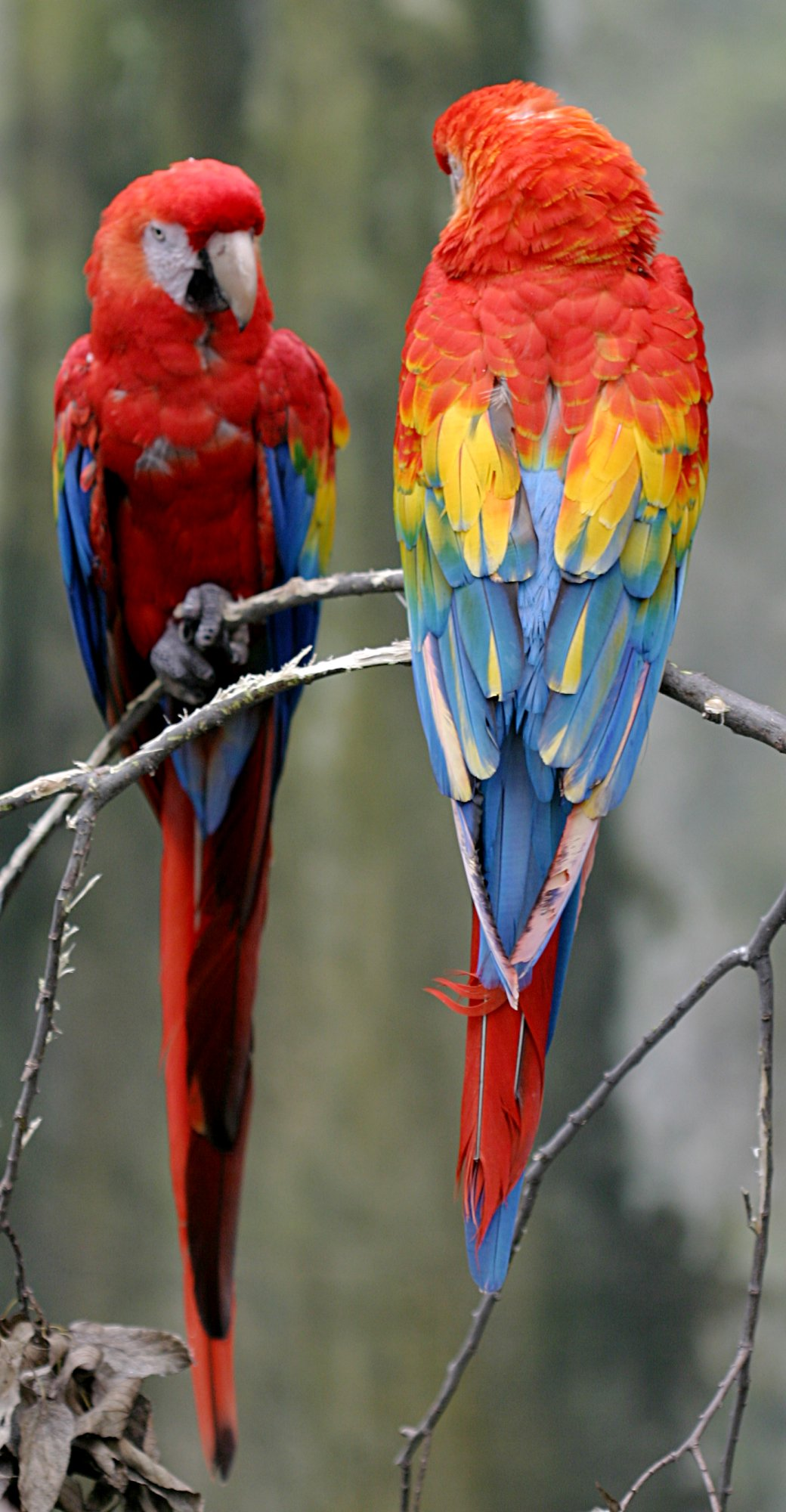
Wing clipped scarlet macaw

The Lied Jungle opened on April 4, 1992, at a cost of $15 million. It is one of the largest indoor rainforest exhibits in the world; it occupies an 80-foot (24 m) tall building that spans 1.5 acres (0.61 ha) and is located just inside the main entrance. This exhibit allows visitors to look out from behind a 50-foot (15 m)-tall waterfall.

Inside are 123,000 ft^{2} (2.82 acres; 11,400 m^{2}) of floor space, of which 61,000 ft^{2} (1.4 acres; 5,670 m^{2}) are planted exhibit space; 35,000 ft^{2} (0.8 acres; 3,250 m^{2}) are a display management area; and 11,000 ft^{2} (0.25 acres; 1,020 m^{2}) are an education area.

Visitors can walk along a trail on the floor of the jungle, as well as on a walkway around and above the animals. The exhibit was (at least partially) closed between 2020 and 2023 due to the COVID-19 pandemic. As of July 2023, the Lied Jungle exhibit had been fully re-opened to the public. Both levels are split into sections by continent, including Asia, Africa, and South America.

Along both trails, about 90 species can be found, including:

- Black howler
- Blue monkey
- Colombian spider monkey
- Common squirrel monkey
- De Brazza's monkey
- Red-backed bearded saki
- Pygmy hippopotamus
- Wolf's mona monkey
- Blue-and-yellow macaw
- Scarlet macaw
- Luzon bleeding-heart
- Nicobar pigeon
- Pied imperial pigeon
- African pygmy goose
- Hamerkop
- Javan pond heron
- Sunbittern
- Lowland paca
- Malayan tapir
- Indian crested porcupine
- Müller's gibbon
- White-fronted capuchin
- White-handed gibbon
- Asian small-clawed otter
- Spotted-necked otter
- White-faced whistling duck
- Indian flying fox
- Blood python
- Yellow anaconda
- Arapaima
- Electric eel
- Ocellate river stingray
- Mekong giant catfish
- Pacu
- Piranha
- Giant Gourami
- Philippine crocodile

Ring-tailed lemurs, red ruffed lemurs, and black-and-white ruffed lemurs used to be on display in the Lied Jungle, but were moved to the Expedition Madagascar exhibit when it opened in 2010.

==== Notable points ====
Visitors to the jungle can view the indoor jungle through 90 ft (27 m) of floor-to-ceiling windows at the Durham's TreeTops Restaurant, which is next to the jungle. A portion of the electrical power needed for the jungle is provided by natural gas fuel cells. The jungle has won several awards, including "Single best zoo exhibit in the country" in 1994 by the Family Life Magazine; "Significant Achievement Award for Exhibit Design" in 1993 by the American Association of Zoological Parks and Aquariums; "Top ten designs in the world" in 1992 by Time, and "Top eight US engineering accomplishments" in 1992 by the National Society of Professional Engineers

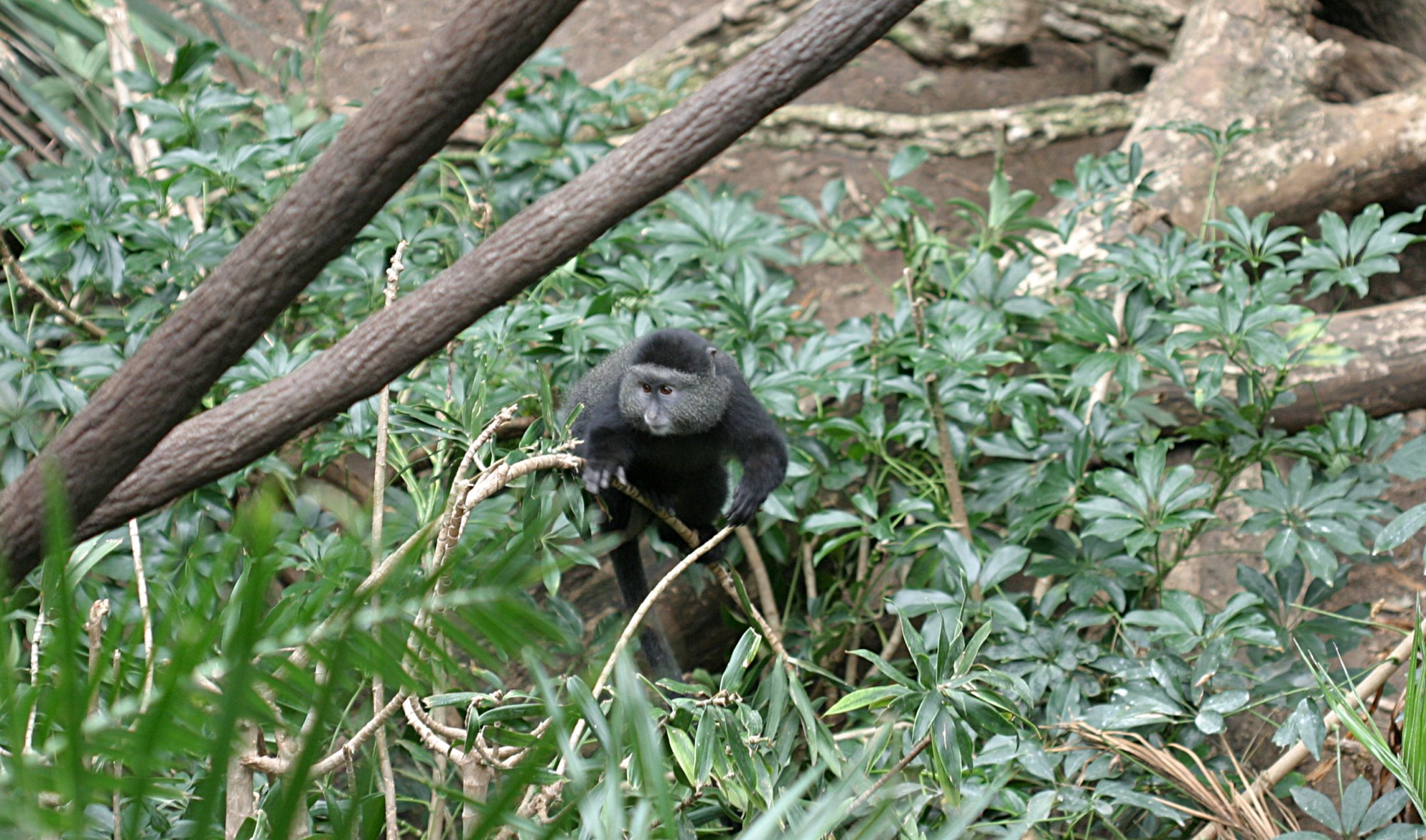
Blue monkey

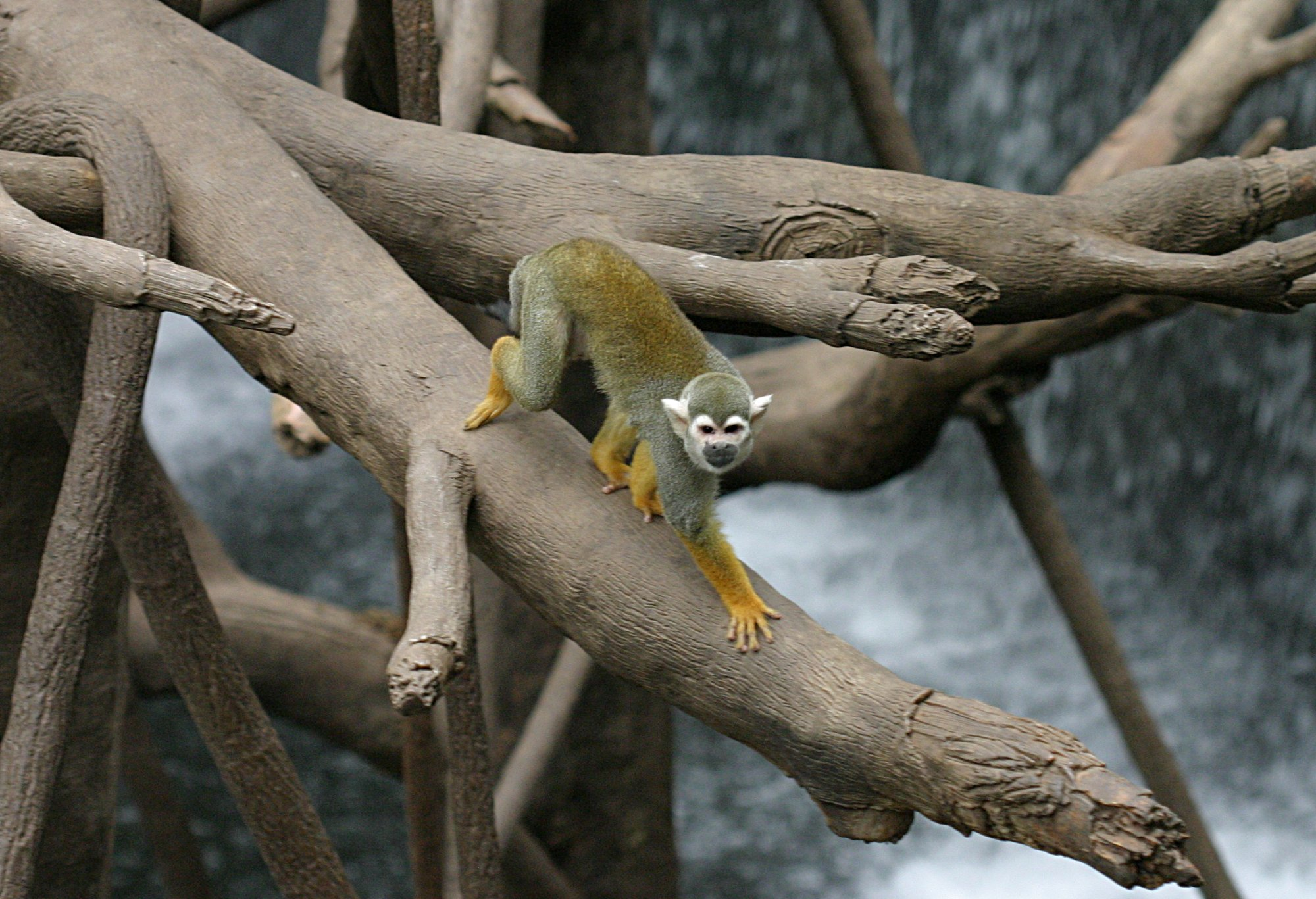
Common squirrel monkey

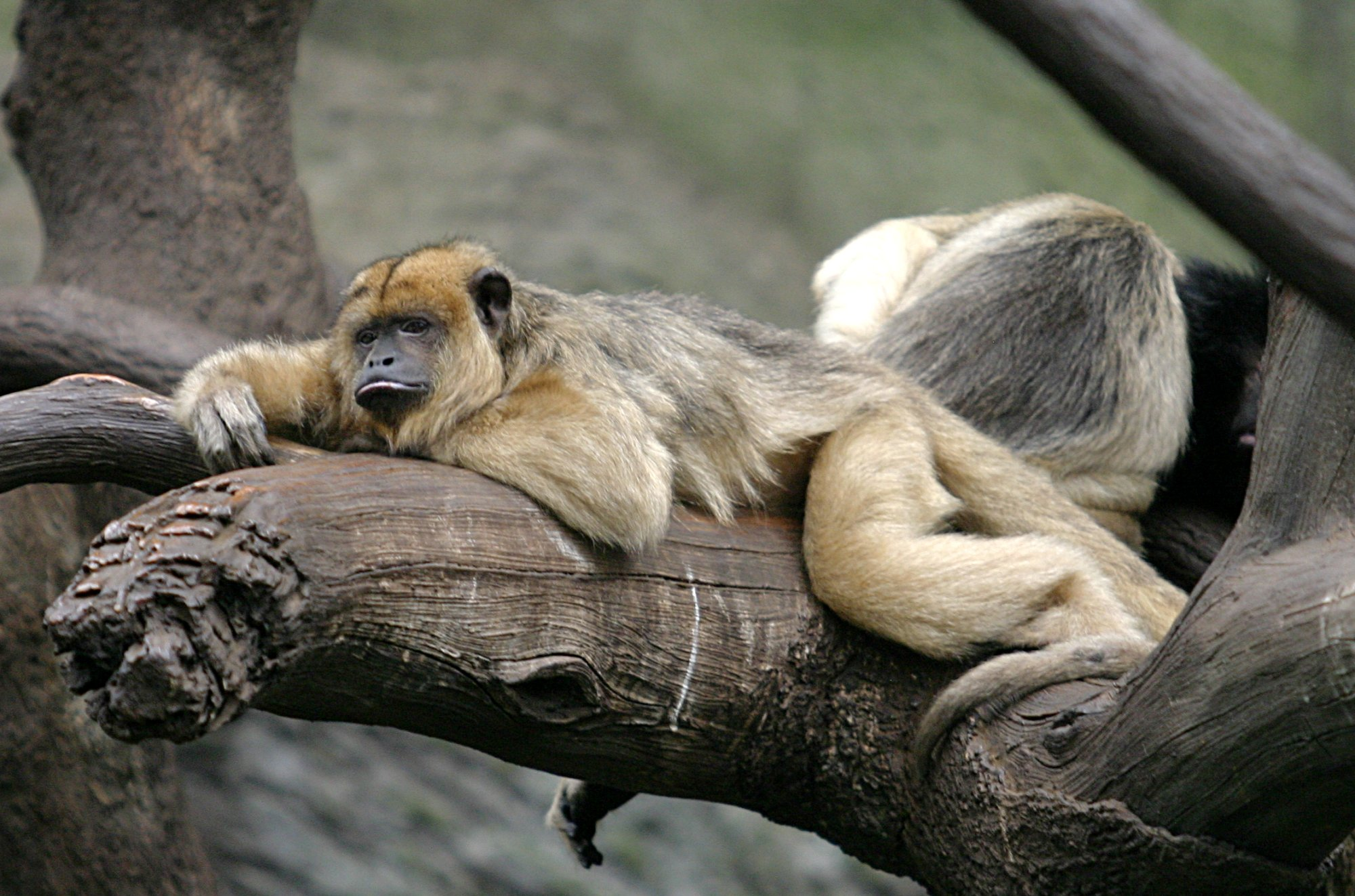
Black howler monkey

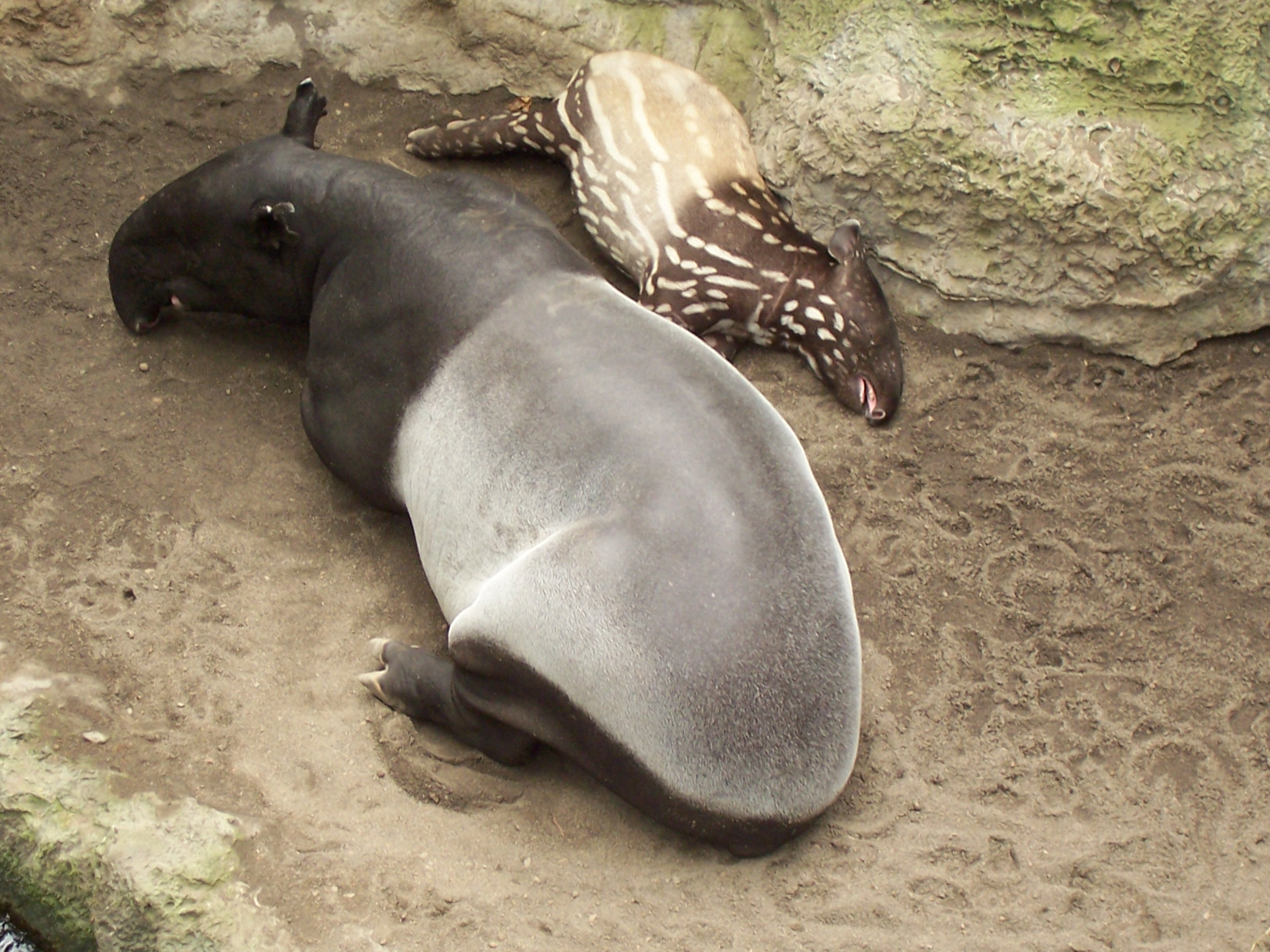
Malayan tapir (with calf)

=== Owen Sea Lion Shores ===
The Owen Sea Lion Shores opened on September 4, 2020, costing $27.5 million. The 1-acre (4,000 m^{2}) exhibit replaced the Durham Family Bear Canyon, and the smaller Owen Sea Lion Pavilion. It features a 275,000-gallon saltwater pool with natural wave chambers, shallow beaches for young pups learning to swim, fish feeders that release fish and calamari at random times and places in the exhibit encouraging hunting behavior, a shaded seating area with a capacity of up to 170, and an underwater viewing cavern.

The exhibit features two species: California sea lions and harbour seals.

=== Simmons Aviary ===
The Simmons Aviary opened in 1983, and is the world's third-largest free-flight aviary. It is home to about 500 birds from around the world. The Aviary is 800 feet (240 m) long and rises to 75 feet (23 m) at the center. The structure is covered with 142,000 ft^{2} (13,200 m^{2}) of two-inch nylon mesh that is supported by a system of cables and poles. The use of nylon instead of wire is a unique concept to modern aviaries.

In this 4-acre (16,000 m^{2}) exhibit, visitors see American flamingos, black crowned cranes, scarlet ibises, hadada ibises, northern bald ibises, straw-necked ibises, hamerkops, cattle egrets, snowy egrets, roseate spoonbills, Inca terns, ducks, black-necked swans and white storks.

=== The Wild Kingdom Pavilion ===
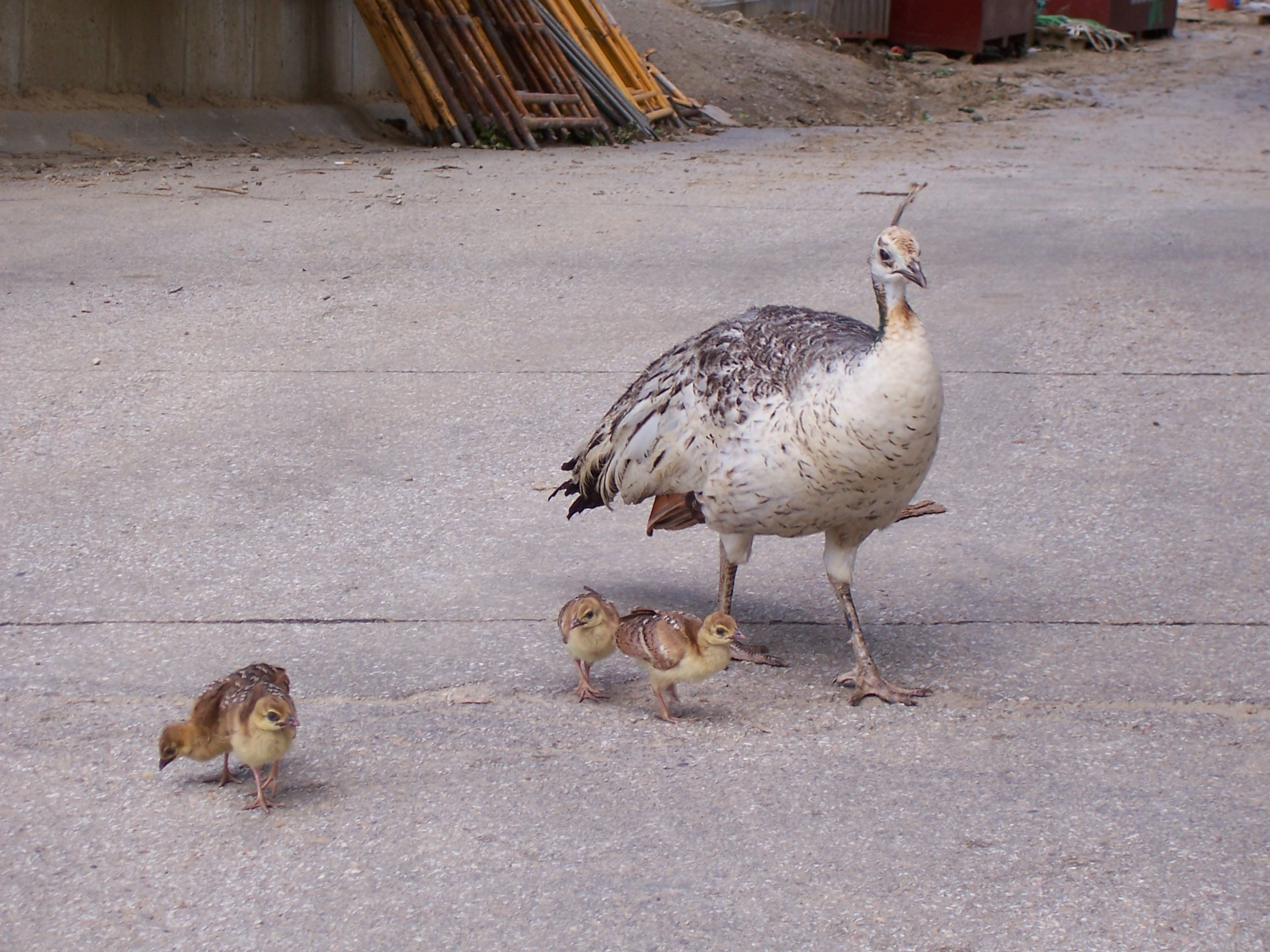
A female peahen and her chicks freely roam the zoo's grounds.

Situated inside the zoo's main entrance, the 21,000-square-foot (2,000 m^{2}) Mutual of Omaha's Wild Kingdom Pavilion was completed in the spring of 1987. The building currently houses reptiles, insects, amphibians, and small mammals, while also providing business offices, a 312-seat multimedia auditorium, and classrooms.

The Wild Kingdom Pavilion has been partially transformed into the Exploration Station exhibit, serving as a safari-themed "Trail Head" where visitors begin their "wild" adventure at Omaha's zoo. Mutual of Omaha's Exploration Station includes a detailed interactive map of the zoo and video previews of major attractions, as well as information on the History of the Zoo. The center of the Pavilion features a 20-foot (6 m)-high netted tree, with free-flying birds. Below the tree includes water displays with spotted turtles, banded archerfish, and a couple dozen large-scale four-eyed fish. The building's original public area, or living classroom, contains what is known as the Small Animal Collection. This area houses part of the zoo's reptile collection, as well as a large number of invertebrates. The animal collection represents the tremendous diversity of the animal kingdom, and includes tarantulas, turtles, snakes, toads, prehensile tailed skinks, hedgehogs, and two large species of cockroach, the death's head cockroach and Peruvian cave cockroach, amongst other small animals.

=== Stingray Beach ===
Stingray Beach features a shallow saltwater pool where visitors can touch and feed three species of stingray; Cownose, Southern, and Atlantic. The area also features turf green space, art sculptures installed prior to the demolition of Bear Canyon, and a small event center.

=== Other exhibits ===
The zoo also features Lozier IMAX Theater, Glacier Bay Landing, a Budgie Encounter in the Adventure Trails children's play area.

== Retired exhibits ==
=== Cat Complex ===
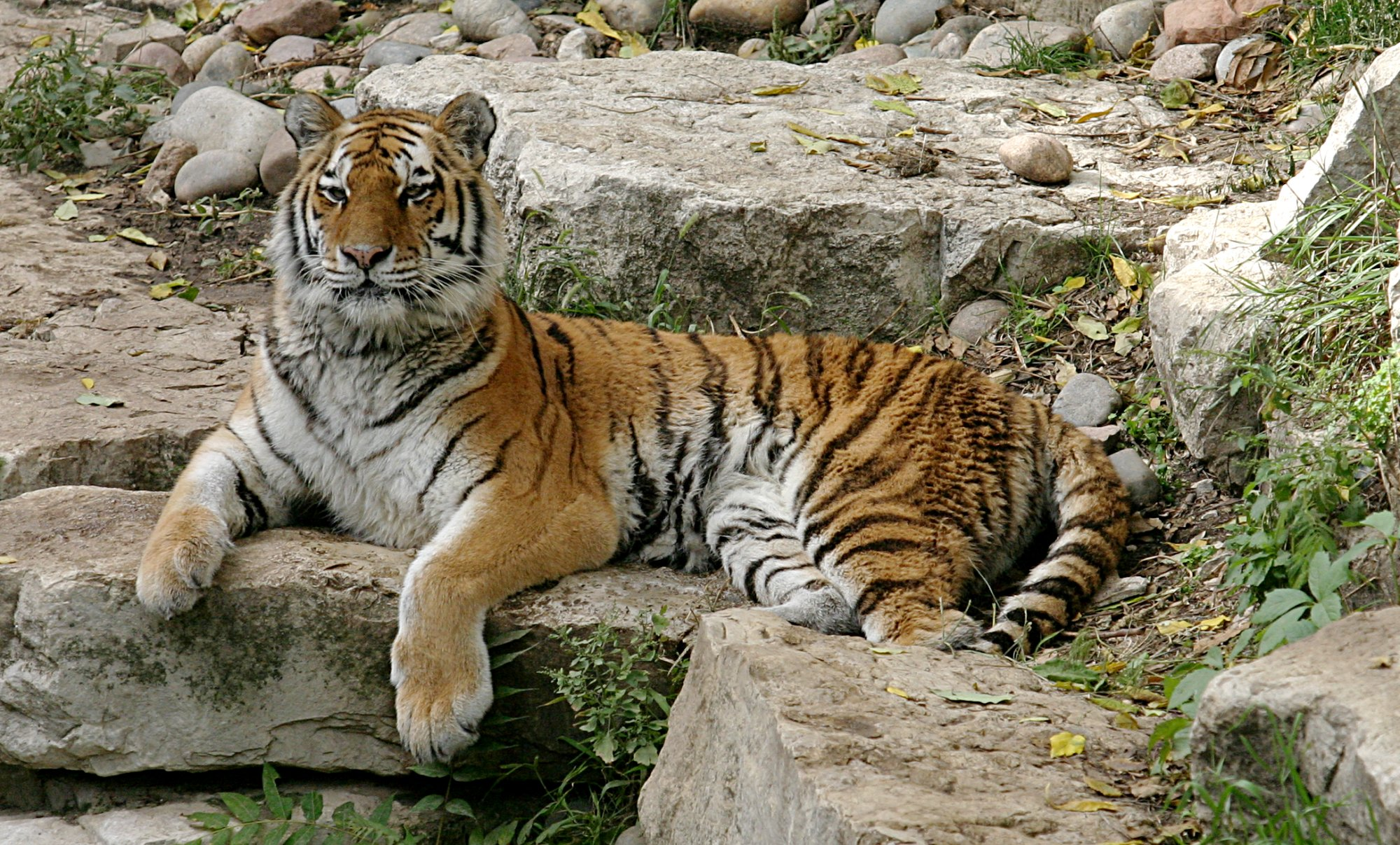
A Siberian tiger

The Cat Complex opened in 1977 at a cost of $2.5 million. The complex had 11 indoor enclosures and 10 outdoor enclosures with a claimed capacity of up to 100 cats. The building was the largest cat-breeding and management facility in North America. The Cat Complex was awarded the "Edward H. Bean Award" (1994) for tiger husbandry by the Association of Zoos and Aquariums. Omaha's Henry Doorly Zoo and Aquarium is known worldwide for its work in the field of artificial insemination of large cats. The zoo's 15-year master plan, composed in 2010, called for the elimination of the Cat Complex along with the overhauling of several other exhibits. Going forward, animals at the zoo are grouped not by their genetic relatives, but by regions of the world. The exhibit was closed permanently in 2019 and demolished in 2022 as the cats located in the Cat Complex were relocated to new exhibits in the African Grasslands and Asian Highlands, or at other zoos and sanctuaries.

The complex contained nine species from the family Felidae:

- Amur leopard (Panthera pardus orientalis)
- Cougar (Puma concolor)
- Fishing cat (Prionailurus viverrinus)
- Jaguar (Panthera onca)
- Snow leopard (Panthera uncia)
- African lion (Panthera leo)
- Bengal tiger (Panthera tigris tigris)
- Indochinese tiger (P. t. corbetti)
- Siberian tiger (P. t. altaica)

=== Durham Family Bear Canyon ===
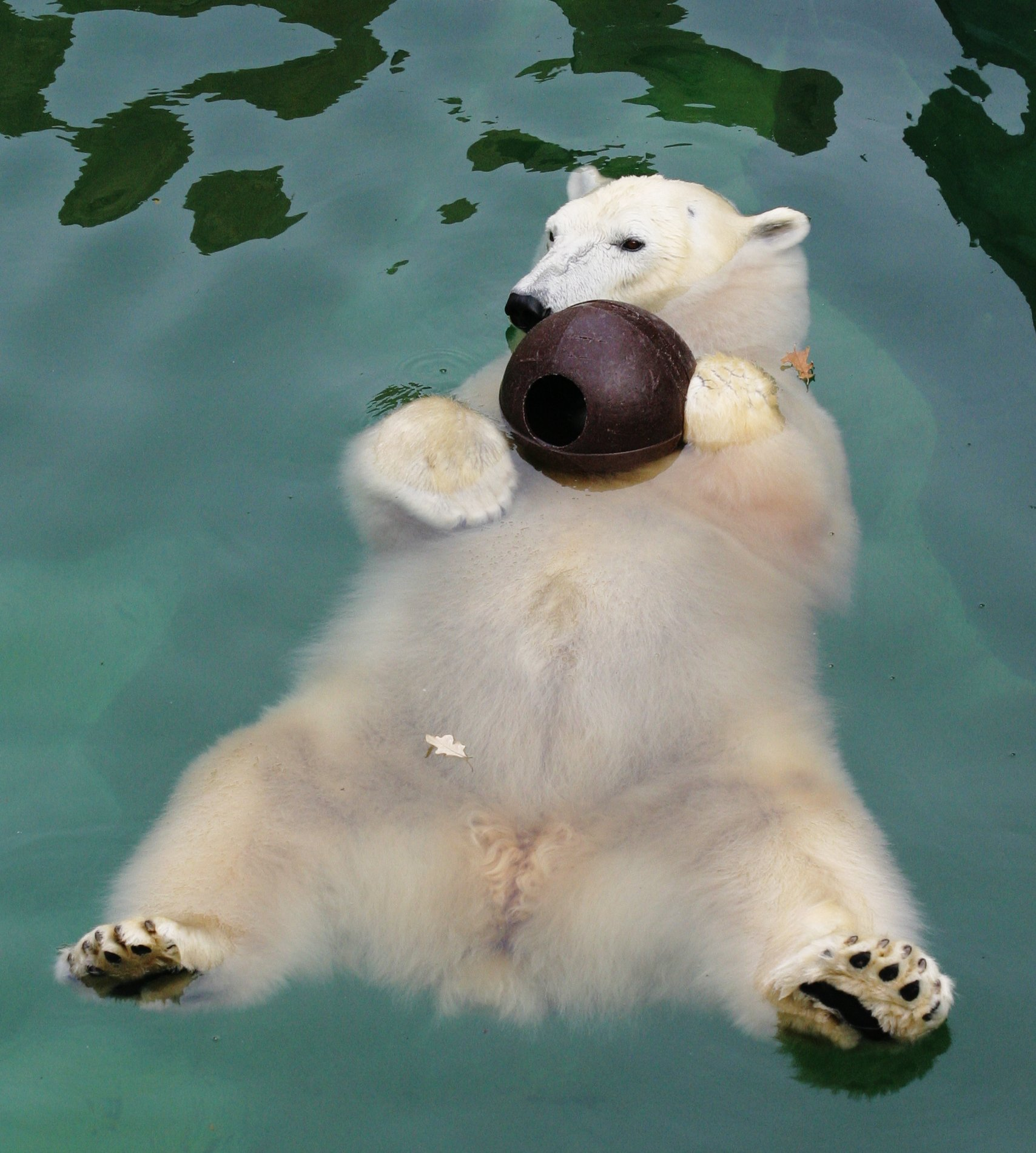
A polar bear floating

The Durham Family Bear Canyon opened in 1989 at a cost of $1.4 million. The canyon had a large 30,000-U.S.-gallon (25,000 imp gal; 110,000 L) tank for polar bears. Having previously housed four bear species – the polar bear, the American black bear, the sun bear and the spectacled bear, it was closed and demolished in 2018 to make room for Owen Sea Lion Shores.

=== Red Barn Park ===
The Red Barn Park was a petting zoo that opened in 1966. It included numerous domesticated animals including goats and cattle and was particularly noteworthy because of the large red barn that could be found in the area. It was demolished in 2018 and replaced with the Glacier Bay Landing area which opened in the spring of 2019. Many of the animals found in the exhibit were transferred to the Children's Adventure Trails.

== Conservation ==
=== Amphibian Conservation Area ===
The zoo's Amphibian Conservation Area opened following the 2005 release of the International Union for Conservation of Nature's Global Amphibian Assessment, as in-depth status report on the world's 8,000-plus known frogs, toads, salamanders, and caecilians, which declared amphibians as the most significantly threatened group of vertebrates in the world. The mission of the behind-the-scenes area, which is not accessible to visitors, is to address wild amphibian decline by continually advancing conservation efforts through evolving welfare, reproduction, collaboration, and reintroduction.

The 3,800 square-foot facility features 13 temperature-controlled rooms, a specialized wastewater treatment system, insect culturing area and thorough disinfection protocols to ensure the entire space remains pathogen-free. With only three full-time keepers, the Amphibian Conservation Area has supported the release of more than 121,000 amphibians to date.

==== Recovery Program Impact ====
Wyoming Toad

- Population status: Extinct in the wild with one population remaining in a few release sites in the Laramie Basin of Wyoming.
- Recovery program involvement: Active since 1992. The zoo maintains the studbook for the Wyoming Toad Species Survival Plan.
- Contribution to the species: 31,000-plus individuals released with releases planned annually

Western Boreal Toad

- Population status: Since 1994, the species has declined across much of the western United States, extending north to Alaska with a genetically distant and declining population at southern Utah's Paunsaugunt Plateau.
- Recovery program involvement: 1995 – Present
- Contribution to the species: 3,877 individuals released with releases planned annually

Eastern Hellbender

- Population status: North America's giant salamander is found across 15 states, including northeastern Mississippi, northern Alabama, northern Georgia, Tennessee, western North Carolina, western Virginia, West Virginia, Kentucky, eastern Illinois, southern Indiana, Ohio, Pennsylvania, western Maryland, and southern New York with a distinct declining population occurring in east-central Missouri.
- Recovery program involvement: 2012–2017
- Contribution to the species: 91 individuals released

Puerto Rican Crested Toads

- Population status: Critically endangered with only 1,000–3,000 remaining in the wild. It is the only toad native to Puerto Rico.
- Recovery program involvement: 1998 – Present
- Contribution to the species: 80,000-plus individuals released with releases planned annually

Mountain Yellow-Legged Frog

- Population status: Endangered with two distinct populations in southern California's Sierra Nevada Mountains
- Recovery program involvement: 2017 – Present
- Contribution to the species: 800-plus individuals released with releases planned annually

Dusky Gopher Frog

- Population status: The most critically endangered frog species in the United States and presently known to only survive in Mississippi's Harrison and Jackson Counties. At one point, possibly less than 75 adults remained in the wild.
- Recovery program involvement: 2008 – Present (Zoo has had animals since 2004.)
- Contribution to the species: 792 individuals released with releases planned annually

Amphibian Rescue and Translocation Program for Native Species

- Status: Ground-breaking construction projects, day-to-day exhibit maintenance, weather events and other unforeseen circumstances can put amphibians native to the area in harm's way. After discovering a population of American toads living on grounds, zoo staff routinely survey the entire property in search of these and other amphibian species, sometimes in the early stages of life, who need care or need to be relocated to a safer environment to thrive.
- Species involved: Include but not limited to: American toad, Woodhouse toad, the chorus frog, plains leopard frog, and eastern tiger salamander.
- Recovery program involvement: 2012 – Present
- Contribution to the species: 3,480 individuals released

== Research ==
The Bill and Berniece Grewcock Center for Conservation and Research is a world-class research center at the zoo. The center has discovered several new species. The world's first in vitro-fertilized (IVF, "test-tube") gorilla resides at the zoo. The world's first artificially inseminated tiger was born in Omaha in 1991, followed by the world's first artificially inseminated gaur. The original 16,448-square-foot (1,528.1 m^{2}) facility was constructed in 1996. In 2006, it underwent a $6 million expansion which brings the total space to 32,000 sq ft (3,000 m^{2}).

The research center focuses on six areas:

- Education and technology transfer
- Conservation medicine
- Molecular genetics
- Reproductive physiology
- Horticulture
- Nutrition

=== Mouse lemurs ===
A study led by Edward Louis, a conservation geneticist at the zoo, identified three new mouse lemurs (Simmons' mouse lemur, Mittermeier's mouse lemur, and Jolly's mouse lemur) with the first named after Lee Simmons, the zoo's director.

== Rides and transportation ==
=== Railroad ===
The Omaha Zoo Railroad is a 2.5-mile (4.0 km), 2 ft 6 in (762 mm) narrow gauge train that loops through the zoo. The railroad began operations on July 22, 1968, after the track was laid down by the Union Pacific railroad. The train operates with one of two oil-powered steam locomotives. Riva is about twice as powerful as the #119 (although it is almost 80 years older) and is regularly used on weekends when more visitors are present. The #119 is the original locomotive for the zoo. A new diesel locomotive arrived in September 2008. This diesel is a 2-axle Plymouth locomotive and is used for switching operations of the passenger cars and other railroad-related projects.

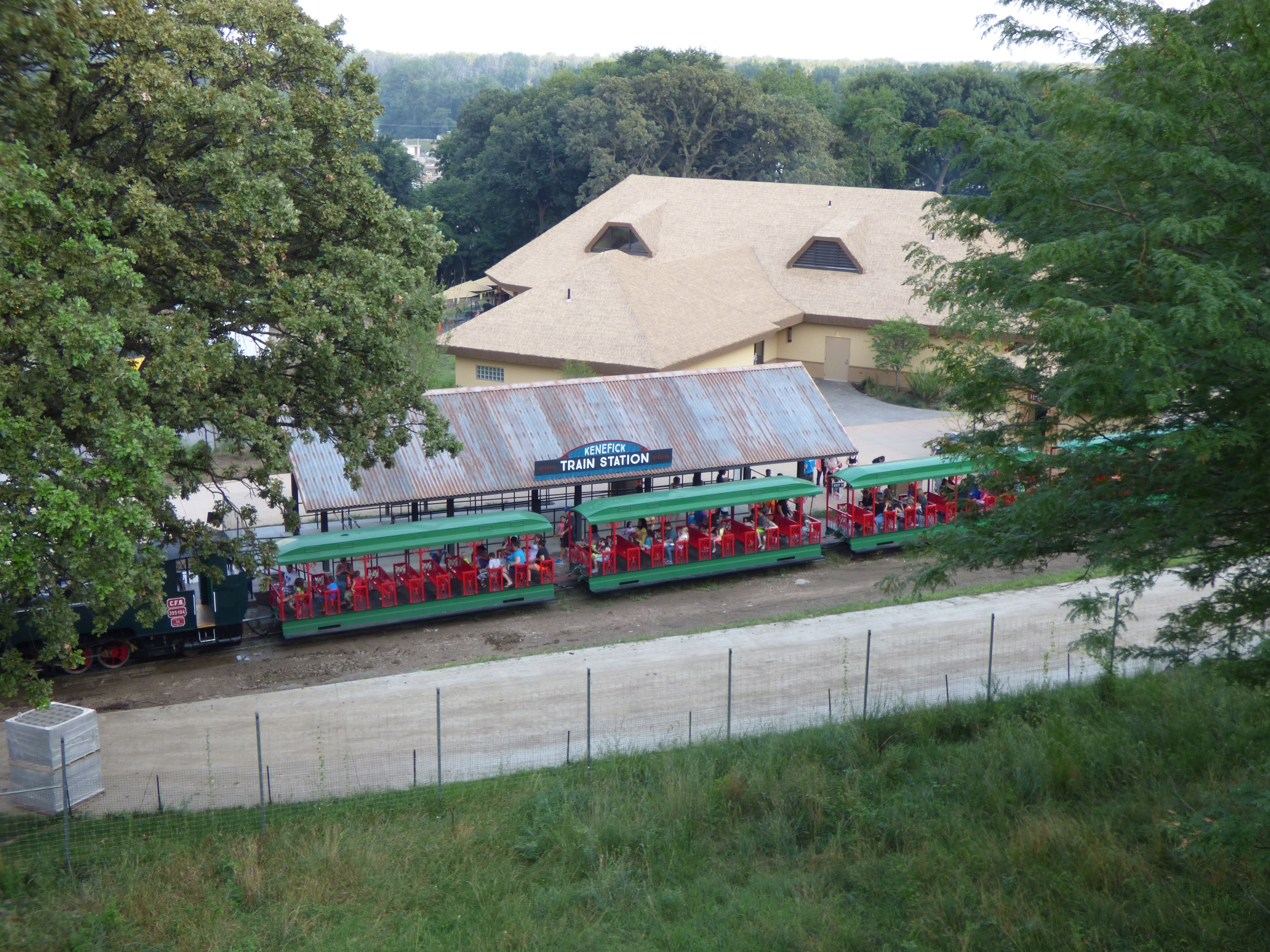
Kenefick Train Station

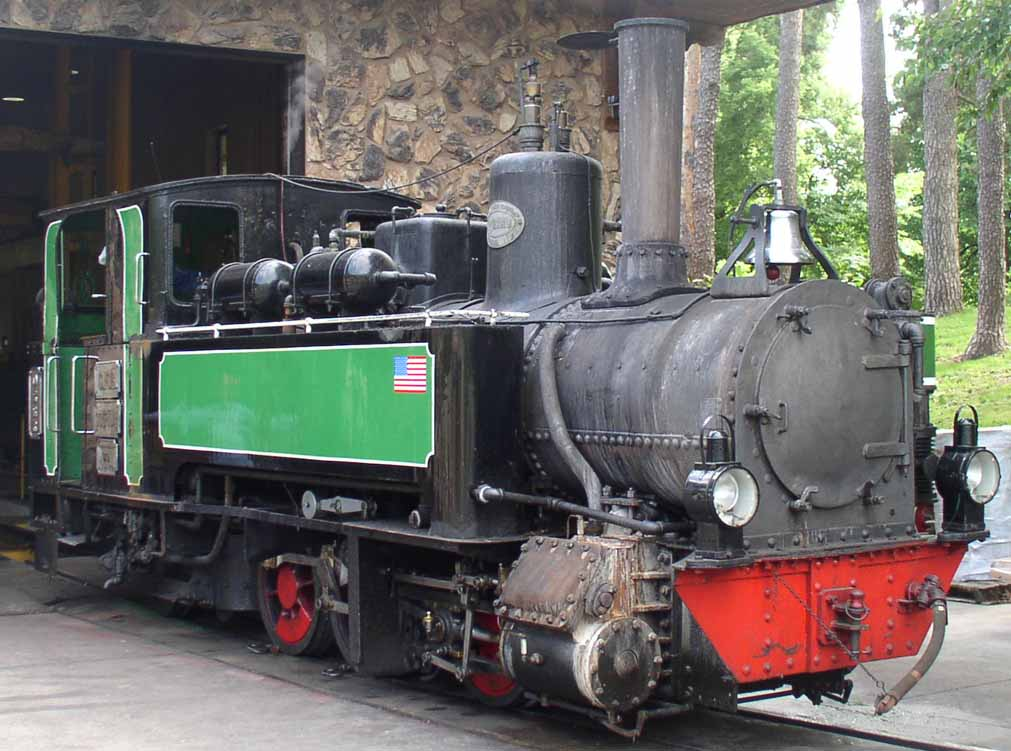
1890 "Riva", CFR #395-104

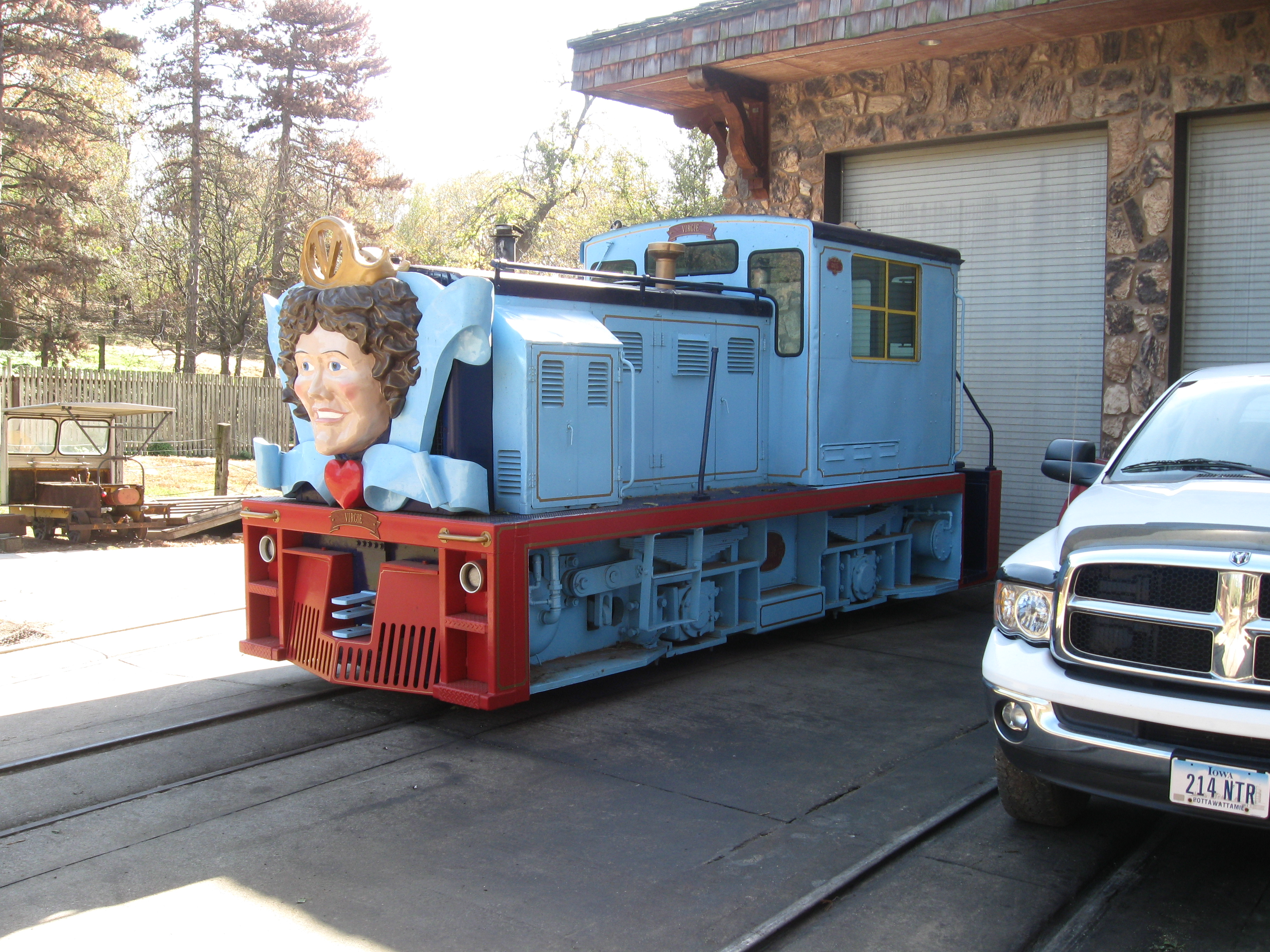
1957 "VIRGIE"

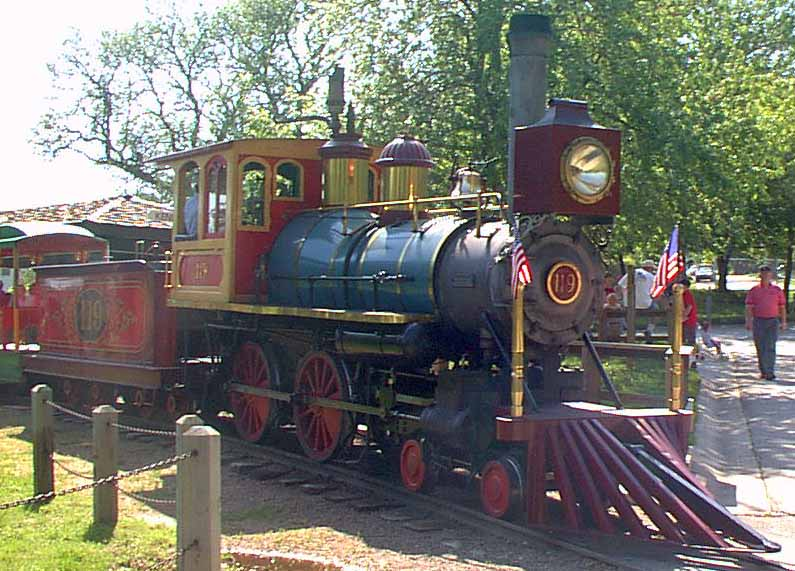
1968 #119

=== Tram ===
The tram is a trackless tram that drives on the walkway paths around the zoo. It has four stops:

- By the Desert Dome (top of the hill)
- Between the elephant/zebra yard and pygmy goat corral
- By the playground near the sea lions
- Between the carousel and Alaskan Adventure splashpad

=== Skyfari ===
Omaha's Henry Doorly Zoo and Aquarium opened the Skyfari in 2009. It is an aerial tram that runs from one stop at the Butterfly and Insect Pavilion to the lion platform. It goes over the African veldt (ostriches and giraffes), cheetahs, the railroad tracks, the Garden of the Senses, the koi lagoon, and the lions.

=== Carousel ===
A carousel is available on which visitors can ride handcrafted recreations of wild animals. In 2021, it was moved to the Glacier Bay area which has been recently renovated.

== Educational programs ==
External videos
- Virtual Tour – a 2022 pictorial tour of the major exhibits (metroTV, full video)

Major zoo educational programs include on-site preschool and high school courses, internships, and volunteer work. Other programs include field trips, guided tours, educator workshops, and ambassador animal presentations. Other educational programming includes overnight campouts, scouting events, summer camps, birthday parties, and on-site speakers.
