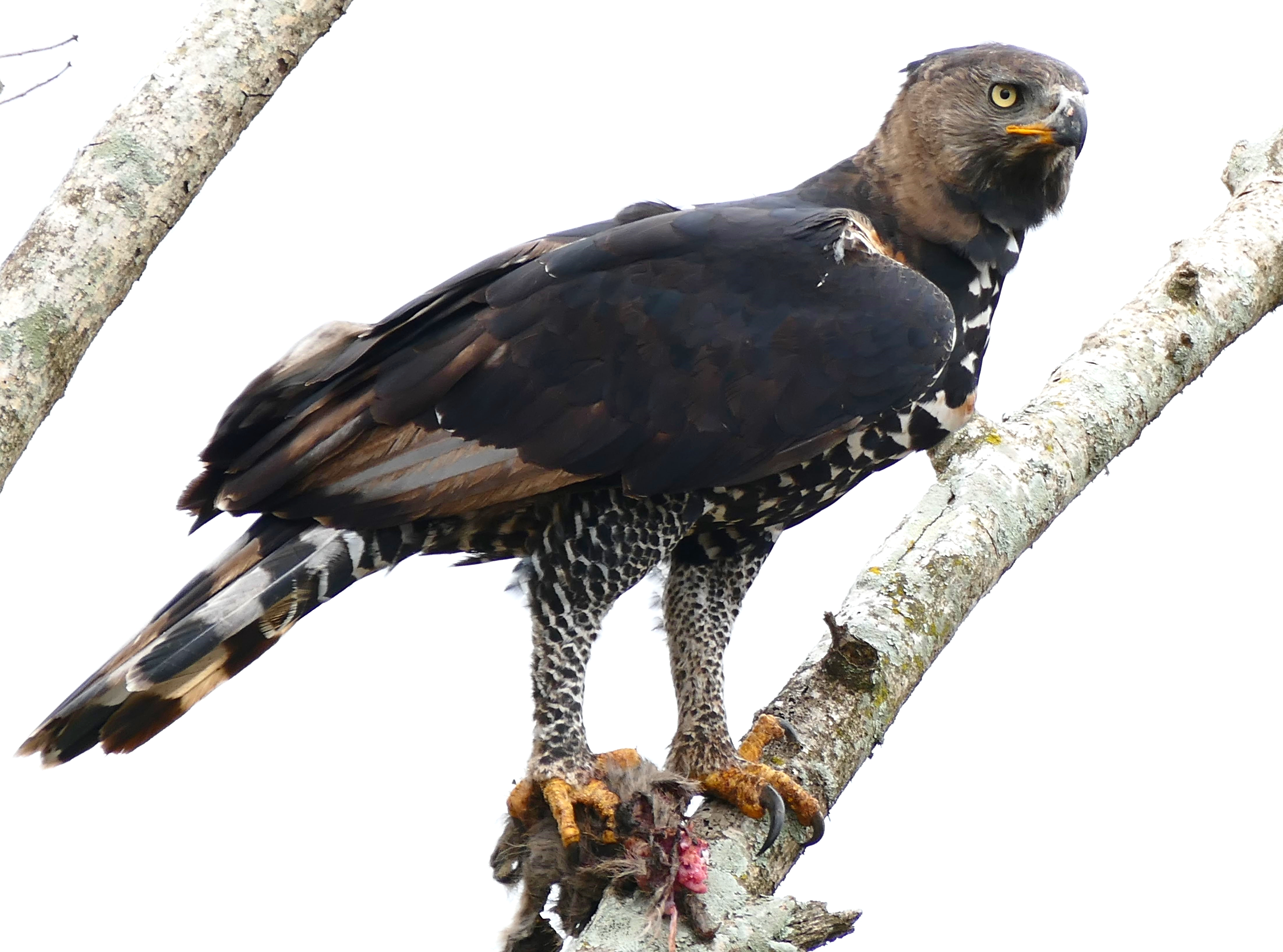
- With prey, in South Africa

Conservation status
- Near Threatened (IUCN 3.1)

Scientific classification
- Kingdom: Animalia
- Phylum: Chordata
- Class: Aves
- Order: Accipitriformes
- Family: Accipitridae
- Genus: Stephanoaetus
- Species: S. coronatus

Binomial name
- Stephanoaetus coronatus (Linnaeus, 1766)
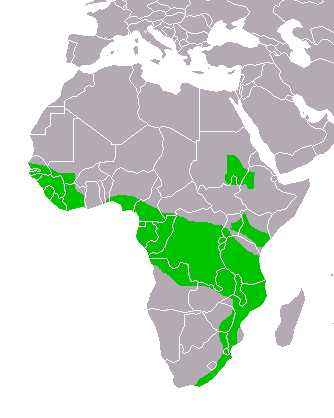
- Crowned eagle range

Synonyms
- Falco coronatus Linnaeus, 1766

= Crowned eagle =

Species of bird

The crowned eagle, also known as the African crowned eagle or the crowned hawk-eagle (Stephanoaetus coronatus), is a large bird of prey found in sub-Saharan Africa; in Southern Africa, it is restricted to more easterly areas. Its preferred habitats are principally riparian woodlands and various forests. The crowned eagle is the only extant member of the genus Stephanoaetus. A second species, the Malagasy crowned eagle (Stephanoaetus mahery), went extinct after early humans settled on Madagascar.

Mammals comprise the majority of the eagle's diet. Principal prey species vary throughout its large range, with monkeys, antelopes, rodents, hyraxes, and viverrids all being notable prey groups. Other wild mammals recorded as prey include bushpigs, pangolins, and bats. Birds are also a considerable component of the diet in some populations. In an urban population in Durban, South Africa, camera traps at nest sites revealed that 25% of prey items were birds, of which 17% were hadada ibis juveniles. In Taï, Côte d'Ivoire, trumpeter hornbills comprised 8% of prey. Reptiles and carrion are occasionally consumed. Domesticated cats, dogs, sheep, goats, and chickens are sometimes taken. However, in Durban, South Africa, domesticated animals comprised only 6% of the diet across 11 nests and 836 prey items, of which 3% were chickens. There is at least one credible report of an attack, presumably a case of attempted predation, on a 19.6 kg human child.

Although the crowned eagle's long tail imparts an overall length of up to 90 cm (35 in), it is lighter by weight, and has a considerably shorter wingspan, than Africa's largest eagle, the martial eagle (Polemaetus bellicosus). It is, nevertheless, considered Africa's most powerful eagle with respect to its prey's body size. It has been known to prey on ungulates as large as bushbuck (Tragelaphus scriptus), which can weigh up to 30 kg (66 lb), albeit usually much less. The crowned eagle possesses unusually large talons and strong legs, and may kill by simply crushing prey's skull. The eagle is also bold and ferocious; records documented from beneath a nest show the remains of a large male sooty mangabey weighing 11 kg (24 lb).

Due to their ecological and behavioral similarities, the crowned eagle is considered to be the African counterpart of the Central and South American harpy eagle (Harpia harpyja). Thanks to its bold and highly conspicuous behavior, it is exceptionally well-studied for a large, forest-dwelling eagle. Due to a relatively high level of habitat adaptability, it was until recently considered to be faring well by the standards of large, forest-dependent raptors. However, today it is generally thought that it is decreasing far more than was previously perceived due to the almost epidemic destruction of native tropical African forest. It is now listed by the IUCN as Near Threatened.

== Taxonomy and systematics ==
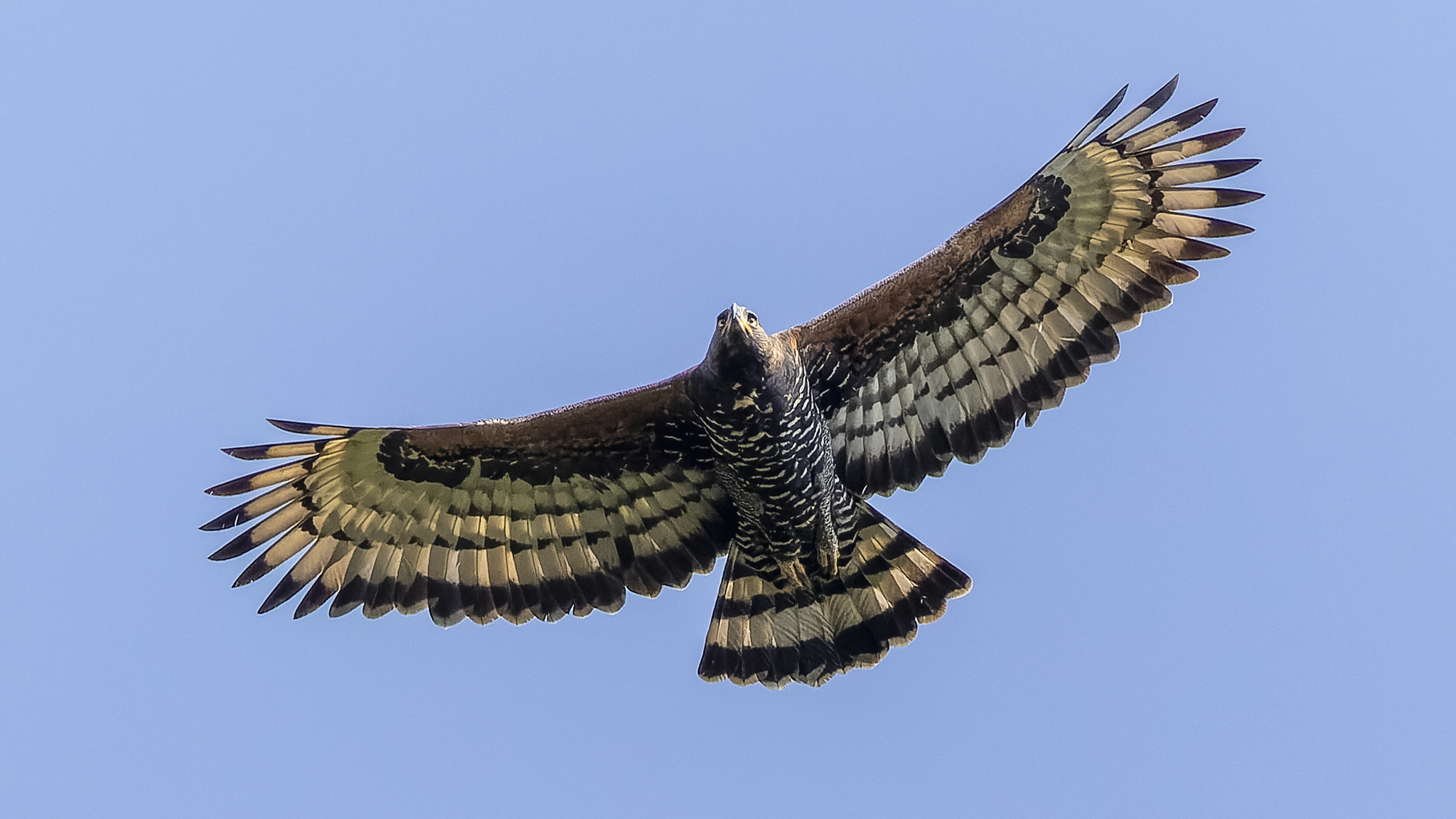
An adult crowned eagle in flight.

This species was first described by Carl Linnaeus in the 12th edition of Systema Naturae, published in 1766, as Falco coronatus. Since birds were grouped largely on superficial characteristics at that time, many unrelated species were grouped by Linnaeus in the genus Falco. The actual taxonomic alignment of the crowned eagle is apparent due to its feathering over its tarsus, which is generally rare in unrelated accipitrids. The crowned eagle is actually part of the diverse "booted eagle" group, which has sometimes been considered a distinct subfamily (Aquilinae). Included in this grouping are the genus Aquila and all species described as "hawk eagles" including the genera Spizaetus and Nisaetus. Other assorted monotypical genera included amongst "booted eagles" are Lophaetus, Polemaetus, Lophotriorchis and Ictinaetus.

At one time, the genus Stephanoaetus was considered a "specialized offshoot" of the Spizaetus hawk-eagles based on morphological attributes. DNA sequences utilizing one mitochondrial and three nuclear genes indicated the crowned eagle is a sister species to the Asian hawk-eagles, which are now considered a separate genus, Nisaetus, that are not closely related to the neotropical hawk-eagles, which are retained in Spizaetus. However, another recent study, this time of sequences of two mitochondrial and one nuclear genes, did not reveal a close relationship of this eagle to any other accipitrid, including the Nisaetus species, and the genus was found to be genetically highly divergent from other "booted" eagles". In a case of convergent evolution, the much heavier harpy eagle, which is outside of the "booted eagle" group, has a similar skeletal morphology to the crowned eagle. Two less well-known, probably distantly related species, the mountain hawk-eagle (Nisaetus nipalensis) and the black-and-chestnut eagle (Spizaetus isidori), have also been found comparable to the crowned eagle. While both are slimmer and smaller, these eagles are also large-bodied, strong-footed offshoots of the evolutionary radiation of forest-dwelling booted eagles, respectively distributed in East Asia and South America. The adult crowned eagle even has somewhat intermediate appearance between these birds, sharing the variable patterning of the mountain hawk-eagle and some of the colouring of the black-and-chestnut.

Until possibly up to 1500, another crowned eagle species, the Malagasy crowned eagle (S. mahery) existed. Similar in size and form to the extant crowned eagle, the Malagasy crowned eagle probably filled a similar niche in Madagascar, but was likely to have preyed on lemurs in place of monkeys. Apparently, the Malagasy crowned eagle became extinct due mainly to the loss of prey and habitat change, attributable to early humans on the island. To date, the living crowned eagle has no recognized subspecies. However, Simon Thomsett noted from field experience possible racial differences between crowned eagles in limited woodland habitats in East and South Africa (called by him the "bush eagles"), which have historically been the main populations studied, and those that live in denser West African rainforest, in the central part of the species distribution. The latter population, he noted, appeared smaller but relatively larger footed, seemed chestier in build and appeared to have deeper eyebrows than the bush eagle; behaviorally the rainforest eagles seemed bolder and louder, which is reinforced in other accounts of the species.

== Distribution ==
The crowned eagle is found only on the continent of Africa. In East Africa, the crowned eagle's range extends from central Ethiopia, to Uganda, forested parts of Kenya and Tanzania to as far south as eastern South Africa, with a southern distribution limit around Knysna. In western and central Africa, the crowned eagle's range extends through much of the (once) vast African rainforest. They may be found from Senegal, The Gambia, Sierra Leone and Cameroon, where they inhabit the Guinean forests, to the Democratic Republic of the Congo, where they live in the Congolian forests, and down south to as far Angola. Despite its large distribution there, the crowned eagle is now rare in many parts of West Africa.

== Description ==
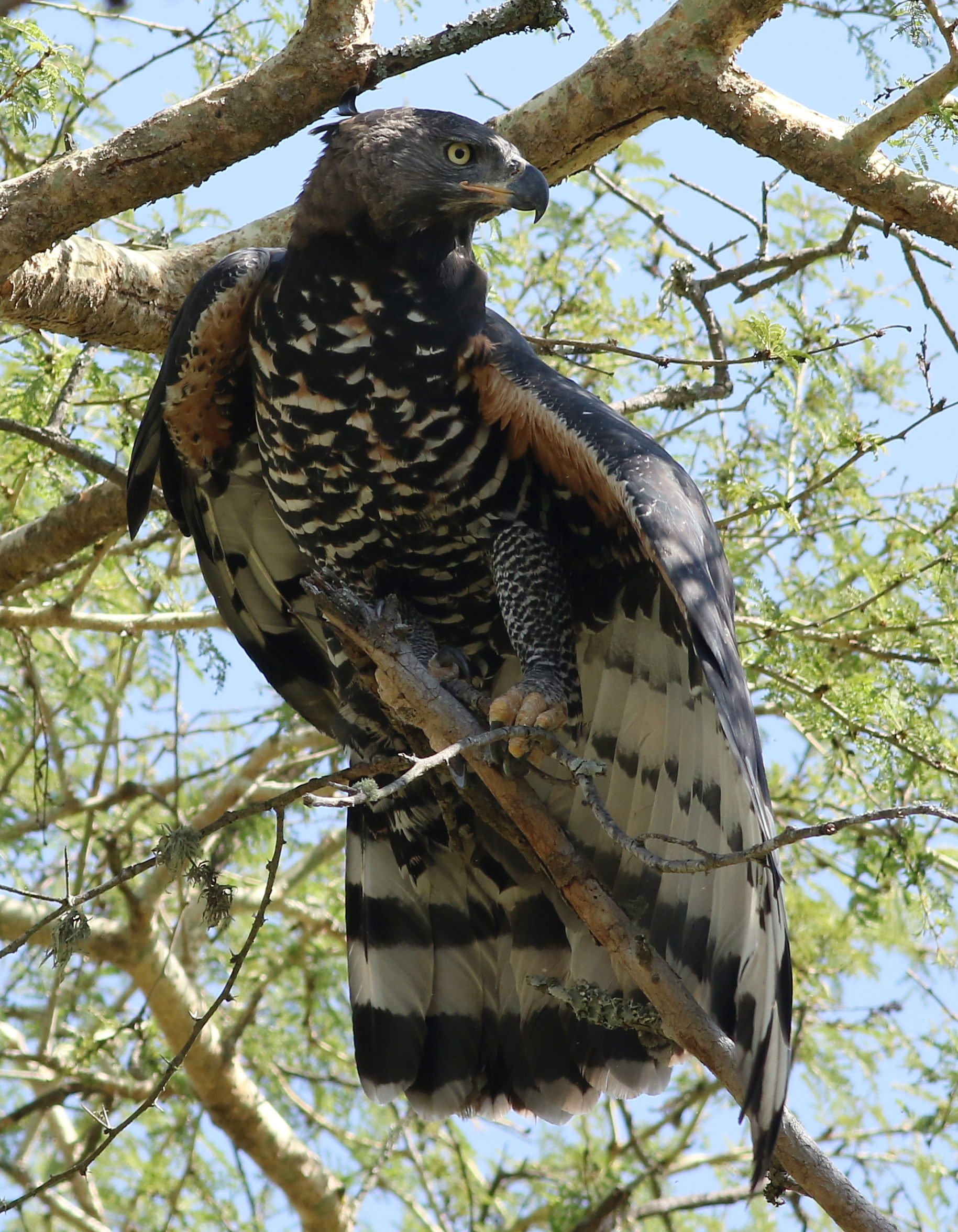
Adult, in South Africa

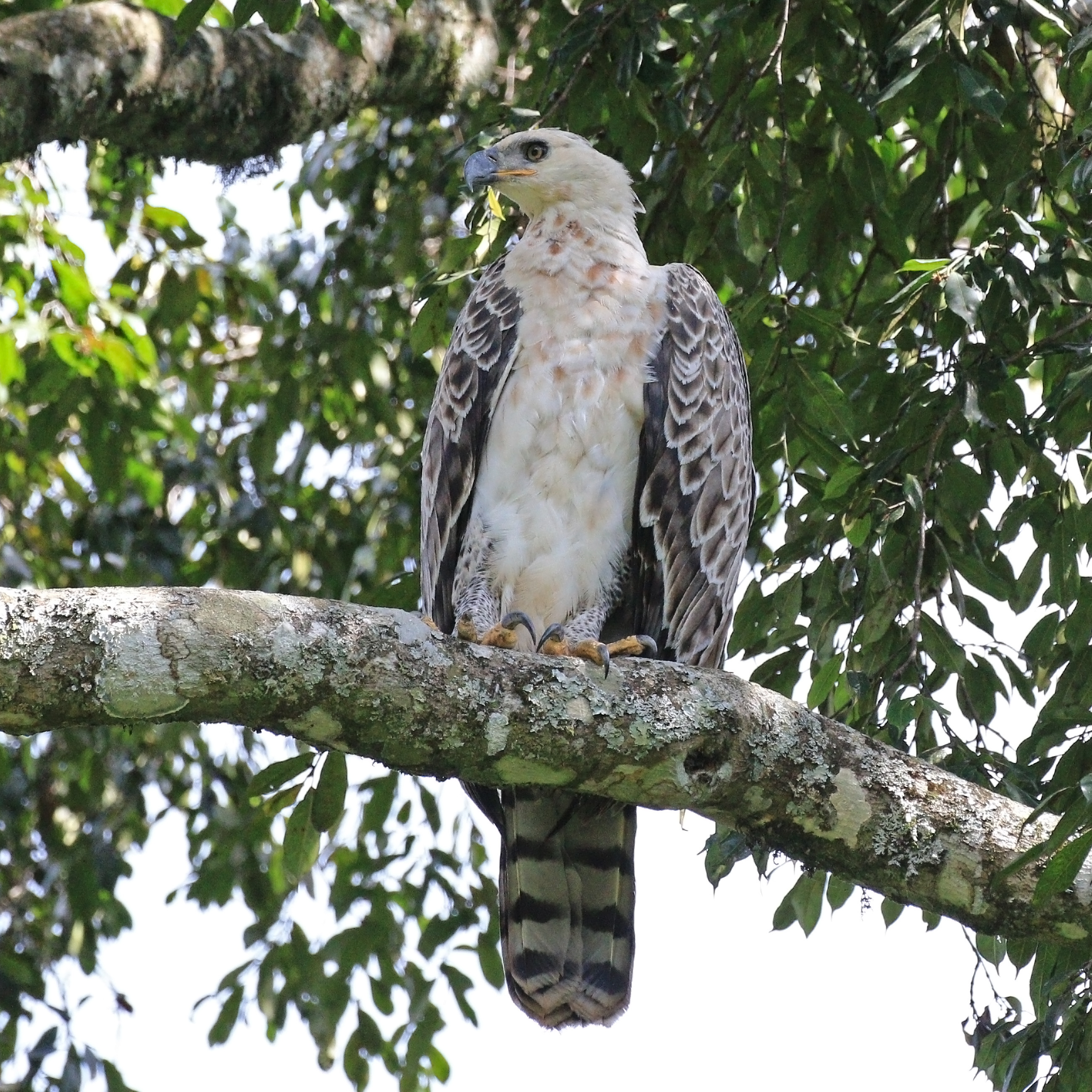
Immature, at Kakamega Forest, Kenya

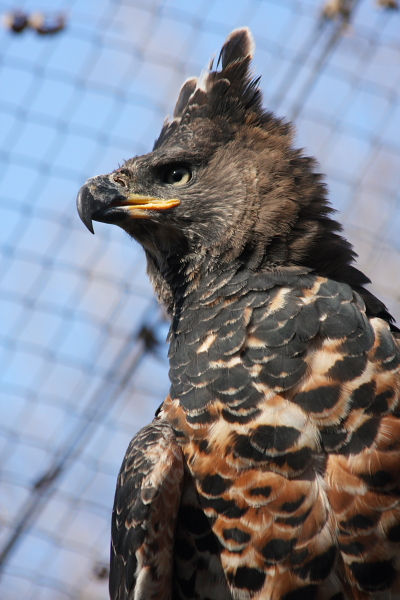
With the crest extended, in captivity

The crowned eagle is a very large eagle. Measuring from 80 to 99 cm (31 to 39 in) in length, it is the fifth longest extant eagle in the world. The female, at a weight of 3.2–4.7 kg (7.1–10.4 lb), is around 10–15% larger than the male, at a weight of 2.55–4.12 kg (5.6–9.1 lb). An average body mass of 3.64 kg (8.0 lb) was given in one account. Elsewhere, an average of 3.8 kg (8.4 lb) has been claimed. Slightly smaller weights were found in a South African survey where 5 males averaged 2.65 kg (5.8 lb) and 8 females averaged 3.71 kg (8.2 lb). Overall, they are the 9th heaviest living eagle species. The wingspan typically ranges from 1.51 to 1.81 m (4 ft 11 in to 5 ft 11 in). The largest authenticated wingspan for a female was 1.9 m (6 ft 3 in), with a claim of wingspans of up to 2 m (6 ft 7 in) needing confirmation. This eagle's wingspan is quite short for the bird's size, being around the same mean width as that of a tawny eagle (Aquila rapax) or a short-toed snake eagle (Circaetus gallicus), species that weigh about half as much as a crowned eagle. However, the somewhat boxy and rounded wings are quite broad, being broader than, for example, the much longer-winged golden eagle (Aquila chrysaetos). The wing morphology of the species gives it maneuverability in its densely wooded environment. The wing chord measures 445–532 mm (17.5–20.9 in), with a median of 467 mm (18.4 in) in males and 512 mm (20.2 in) in females. In South Africa, 5 males averaged 475.2 mm (18.71 in) in wing chord length and 7 females averaged 506.9 mm (19.96 in). While it, on average, is less heavy and has a smaller wingspan than the often sympatric martial eagle, its average total length exceeds that of the martial eagle thanks to its much longer tail. The crowned eagle's tail is from 300 to 410 mm (12 to 16 in) long, with a median of 315 mm (12.4 in) in males and 348 mm (13.7 in) in females. South African males averaged 320.4 mm (12.61 in) in tail length in a sample of 4 and females averaged 352.4 mm (13.87 in). The bill is of a medium size relative to its body size, with one large museum specimen's bill measuring 55 mm (2.2 in) in length from the gape, 45 mm (1.8 in) in culmen length and 33 mm (1.3 in) in bill depth. In South Africa, culmen length averaged 50 mm (2.0 in) in 4 males and 54.9 mm (2.16 in) in 7 females, with a range in both 46.5 to 61.4 mm (1.83 to 2.42 in).

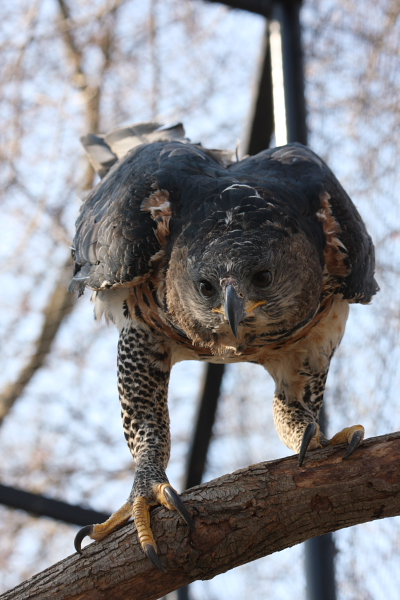
A zoo-kept adult crowned eagle in Hungary illustrates its large talons.

The tarsus is of a modest length for a raptor of its size, at 8.5–10.3 cm (3.3–4.1 in), and is clearly shorter than that of martial eagle. However, the feet and legs are visibly thicker and heavier than those of the martial eagle and the talons are apparently quite massive in both length and width. While few comprehensive measurements of the talon size of wild crowned eagles are known, one female museum specimen reportedly had a hallux-claw (or hind claw, which is the largest talon on accipitrids) of 6.2 cm (2.4 in), while another female was measured at 5 years of age, the age of sexual maturity, 5.74 cm (2.26 in) in the hallux-claw and an adult male measured 4.9 cm (1.9 in). In South Africa, hallux-claw length averaged 52.4 mm (2.06 in) in 5 males and 60 mm (2.4 in) in 7 females with a range in both of 48.6 to 61.4 mm (1.91 to 2.42 in). These figures put their talon size as around the same size as the largest golden eagles and half the size of a harpy eagle. Some captive crowned eagles have been credited with a hallux-claw length of up to 10 cm (3.9 in), although, much like a single report of captive harpy eagles with a 13 cm (5.1 in) hallux-claw, no such outsized talons are known to have been confirmed. In a small sampling of large, forest-dwelling raptors, the front-left talon of the crowned eagle, at 4.74 cm (1.87 in), was around one cm less than that of a harpy eagle or the huge, recently extinct Haast's eagle (Hieraaetus moorei) and slightly smaller than those of the Philippine eagle (Pithecophaga jefferyi). Considering a big female of these species can weigh up to twice as much as an average crowned eagle may illustrate the relative largeness of the crowned eagle's talons.

The adult crowned eagle is quite strikingly plumaged. Its crown is dark to rufous-tinged brown with a prominent, oft-raised black-tipped double crest, which can give the head a somewhat triangular appearance. The upperparts of an adult are a blackish brown-grey color, with a variable tinge of blue. The throat is brown while the belly and breast are white overlaid densely with blackish bars and blotches, variably marked with cream or rich buff-rufous coloration. The wing primaries are white at the base, broadly tipped with black and crossed by two black bars. The tail is black with brownish-grey bands. The thighs and legs are barred and closely spotted with black and white. The underwing coverts of adults have a bold chestnut coloration, spotted lightly with black. The adult crowned eagle has eyes that can range from yellow to almost white, a cere and feet of an ochre-yellow color and black talons. In the wild, misidentification of an adult is improbable thanks to the species' bearing and voice. The strongly barred outer wings and tail are all diagnostic in flight. Further simplifying identification, details such as the crest, the bird's upright perching posture and large size are unique to this animal. While they do differ somewhat in size, the sexes' dimorphism by size is relatively modest and eagles are unlikely to be sexed by this alone. However, the male may be distinguished by his more rapid wing beats (4 or 5 per second) from the more sluggish female (3 or 4 per second).

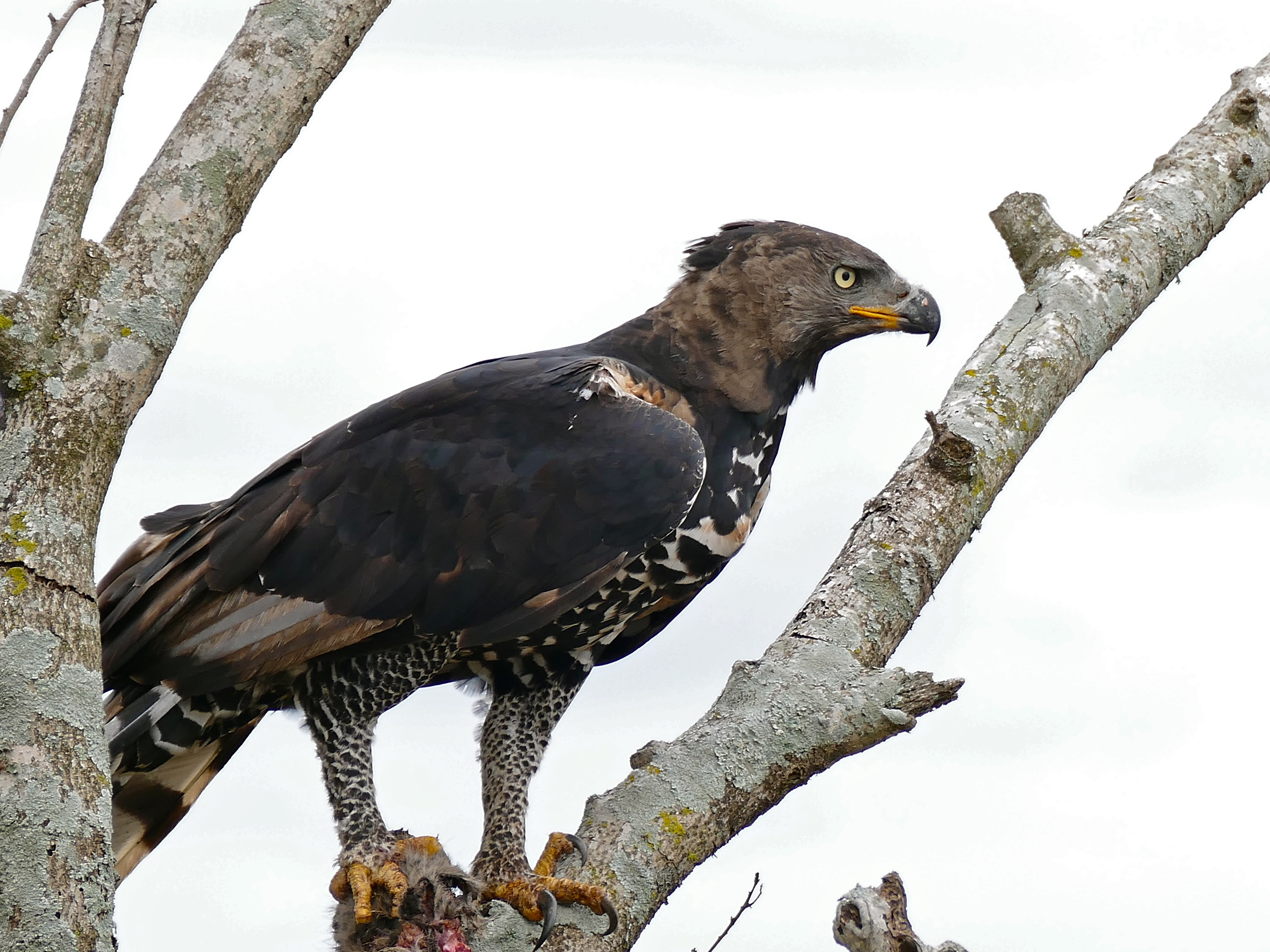
Head close-up, in South Africa

As seen in about half of the "booted eagle" group, the juvenile crowned eagle has strikingly different looking plumage compared to the adults. Much variation occurs as the maturation process occurs. A great majority of juveniles have a white head and underside, which contrast with the thighs and legs, which are heavily spotted with black. The juvenile eagle's back is light brown or grayish-brown, with pale feather edgings that often give the back a scaled appearance, especially on the upper-wing coverts. There is often a pinkish red wash on the upper chest. Just-fledged chicks tend have dark patched faces, freckled bibs and slightly barred chests and spotted legs. Less common juvenile crowned eagle plumages, possible even when they are under a year of age and still under parental care, may include eagles so stripy that they which one could easily have aged as two- to three-year-olds. The tail of the juvenile is black with three pale bars and a narrow black tip. The juvenile eagle's cere is grey and the feet are dull yellow. By 4 months post-fledgling, the inner thighs, previously poorly covered with downy type feathers, are covered with small feathers. While the pale 'morph' young just prior to leaving the nest usually have unmarked tarsus, they soon get spots on the front part of the tibio tarsal joint. The tibio tarsal pad is still bare and obvious up until it is a year old, whereupon it vanishes only to return to incubating females. Eye color is variable too with some having khaki light brown just prior to fledging and others with adult-like yellow ochre eyes. Up to 15 months after leaving the nest, the immature eagles more closely resemble the plumage they have at first independence than the adult's plumage. The juvenile may be confused with the similarly colored juvenile martial eagle, especially in flight. It is distinguished from the martial species in having a much longer, more heavily barred tail, much shorter wings and spotted thighs.

== Habitat ==
The crowned eagle inhabits mainly dense woodlands, including those deep within rainforest, but will sometimes also be found in relict patches, wooded escarpments, riparian strips of Acacia, heavily wooded hillsides, and rocky outcrops throughout its range. The crowned eagle may be found from an altitude of sea-level to at least 3,000 m (9,840 ft). Owing to lack of current suitable habitat, the eagle's range is often somewhat discontinuous.

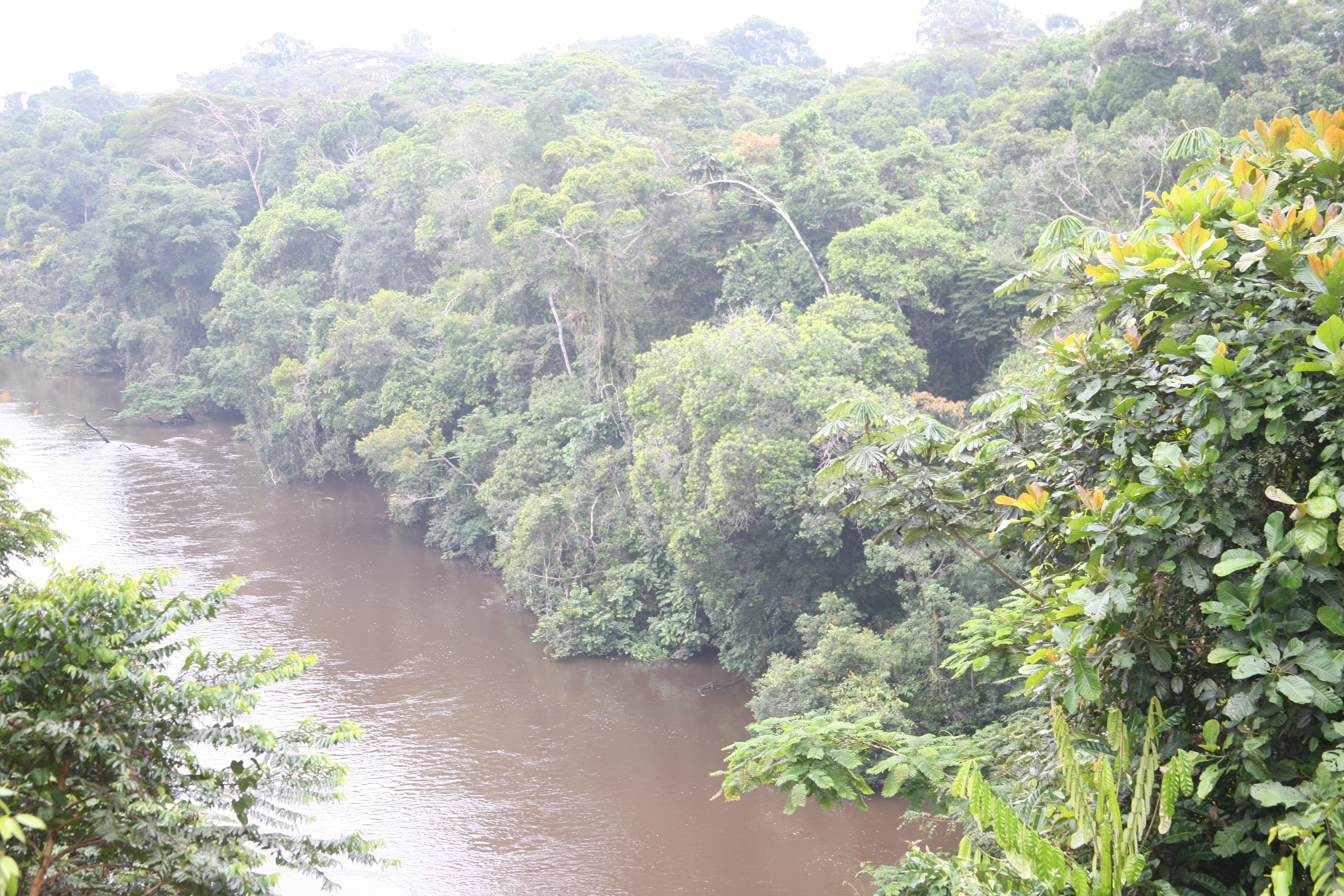
Humid Congolian forests along the Dja River, typical habitat near the center of the crowned eagle's range

In the Democratic Republic of the Congo, the crowned eagle has been confirmed to survive at relatively high densities in protected areas that maintain dense, old-growth rainforests. In Kenya, 84% of the crowned eagles range is within rainforest with an annual rainfall amount of more than 150 cm (59 in). Around stretches of East Africa where protected areas mostly consist of fairly open habitat, crowned eagles usually live in wooded areas of rocky hills and narrow riverine strips, only rarely ranging into savanna surrounding the hills. Southern Africa has been subject to the most comprehensive study of crowned eagle habitat, largely since many areas there would seem inhospitable to a large raptor often associated with old-growth forest. In southern Africa, its distribution south of the Limpopo River coincides largely with montane forest, although it is not restricted to that habitat and may range secondarily into plantations, usually of eucalyptus. In South Africa, it occurs in both lowland and montane evergreen forest, dense woodland, and forested ravines and gorges in open savannas and thornveld. In Zimbabwe, the crowned eagle can be found in quite open woods with Adansonia trees and may occasionally forage in savanna and secondary growth. In Malawi, highland birds forage in lower miombo woodland, and lower altitudes, breeding occurs in deciduous forest, more locally in dense miombo, tall riparian woodlands, and in remnants close to cultivation. Crowned eagles in Zambezi, occurs in evergreen forest in the eastern highlands, in rugged, hilly terrain over the central plateau, in hills and escarpments in the southeastern portions of the central watershed, and in riparian habitat along the larger rivers.

== Behavior ==
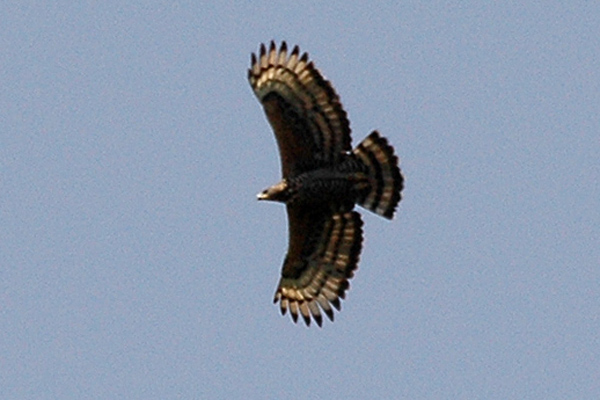
A crowned eagle flying over its territory in Budongo, western Uganda

Typical of most raptors that breed in Africa, the crowned eagle is non-migratory and is largely sedentary. This species usually inhabits a fixed territory throughout the year during its adult life. There is evidence that the birds move about to some degree when circumstances require it, for example when they need to change mates in isolated breeding areas. The greatest movement of any notable distance is usually associated with juvenile birds, which wander relatively widely before maturation. Forty-four birds of various ages that were ringed in southern Africa and recovered were all found near the ringing localities. Small movements by crowned eagles has resulted in them being sighted in improbable habitats, such as on an open savanna hill in Kenya, an open river bed in Lewa Wildlife Conservancy and even a golf course in Nairobi.

The crowned eagle is highly vocal and has a noisy, undulating display flight. In Equatorial Africa, they often call year-around, while elsewhere they may vocalize mainly in the context of breeding and nesting activities. The call is a series of loud whistles that rise and fall in pitch. The male performs an elaborate rise-and-fall display over the forest canopy both during the breeding season and outside it as a territorial proposition. Usually, territorial displays, which outnumber breeding displays, occur around the periphery of the bird's home range while breeding displays are likely to be over or at least near the nest. Displays consists of a series of steep dives and ascents, with a few wing-flaps at the top of each climb and descending circles and figures of eight. During descents, eagles can drop as much as 60 m (200 ft) at a time before circling back up. During this display, the male is noisy, uttering a shrill kewee-kewee-kewee while throwing his head back, often calling for a spell of approximately 30 seconds. The displaying male may reach heights exceeding 900 m (2,950 ft), sometimes even near cloud level at over 2,000 m (6,560 ft) above the ground. The adult female may also perform independent display flights, uttering a lower kooee-kooee-kooee. The female seems to display less often and tends to have a mellower voice. Pairs also perform visually striking mutual displays, sometimes arising from the first type or when the pairs come together after a brief absence. Spectacular tandems, interlocking talons and falling some distance from the sky are typical of mutual displays. Despite the spectacular and conspicuous nature of their display flights, the crowned eagle is sometimes considered a "clumsy" flier out in the open, lacking the grace and speed attributed to other eagles in a high-flying context, such as large Aquila species. While awaiting food at the nest, both the female and the young call out a penetrating, high kwee-kwee-kwee, that can border on incessant.

In disposition, the crowned eagle is considered nervous, constantly alert and on edge. They are quite different from the oft-stately open country eagles such as the Aquila species. In their training and management, crowned eagles are perhaps more reminiscent of a Goshawk (Accipiter gentilis) than Aquila eagles. Some linkage has been made between forest-dwelling habits and having a curious and edgy disposition amongst various raptorial birds. Ironically considering their otherwise hyperactive behavior, the main hunting techniques of crowned eagle require long periods of inactivity, spent sitting on a perch. Mature crowned eagles are reportedly nearly fearless towards humans and, unless shy from prior interactions, unusually prone to treat humans aggressively. Crowned eagles can nest around developed areas, including in the vicinity of quite suburban, developed areas (such as in view of apartment or office buildings), so long as prey is abundant and accessible and the habitat provides enough mature vegetation to facilitate nest building and hunting activities. Some biologists consider this species highly intelligent, cautious, independent and inquisitive when compared to other accipitrids. In falconry, crowned eagles cannot be induced to direct their hunting instinct towards large prey by increasing their hunger, as is done with Aquila eagles, for example. In the context of human interaction, wild, adult crowned eagles are quite the opposite of the martial eagle, which are typically very wary and tends to shun any variety of human activity. However, young crowned eagles in their post-fledging stage differ greatly in behavior from independent or adult eagles. Amongst post-fledging eagles in a semi-captive state, it has been noted that they border on helpless in terms of feeding and defending themselves compared to other accipitrids and are even described as "cowardly", unwilling to even simulate attacking prey until many months after fledging. This implies a learning element occurs in wild crowned eagles during their exceptionally long post-fledging period. Crowned eagles are reportedly variable in temperament as individuals to a degree greater than that found in most other raptors.

=== Breeding ===
Crowned eagles have one of the most prolonged breeding cycles of any bird. It is common for raptors that live around the tropics to have a relatively elongated breeding period. Crowned eagle pairs breed once every two years; a single breeding cycle is approximately 500 days in duration. Most other eagle species complete a breeding cycle in under six months, or in about 35% of the time it takes the crowned eagle. While the incubation and nestling stages are about average for a tropical eagle (for example the black-breasted snake-eagle (Circaetus pectoralis), about half the weight of this species, has an incubation/nestling cycle of a similar length), it is the extraordinary post-fledging period of 9–11 months that makes the crowned eagles' breeding cycle so long. In harpy and Philippine eagle, although these are less extensively studied, it may take a similar or even longer amount of time for the young to attain full independence. A case of crowned eagle pairs that reportedly bred every year in South Africa are unsubstantiated but may be due to an apparently high population loss rate among juvenile eagles near areas that are heavily populated by humans. Breeding can occur almost year-around throughout the range, though egg laying seems to peak roughly around the end of the African wet season or the early dry season, from July to November. Territories or home ranges are maintained vigorously. In Zimbabwe, individual home ranges can vary from 140 to 200 km^{2} (54 to 77 sq mi) in size. Near the city of Nelspruit in South Africa, home ranges averaged 30 km^{2} (10 sq mi) in size. In southern Africa, the mean distance between active nest sites can range from 2 to 19.5 km (1.2 to 12.1 mi).

After engaging in the breeding display described above, the pair collaborate in building a massive nest in a fork of a large forest tree, typically from 12 to 45 m (40 to 150 ft) above the ground. While the female fetches more nesting material, the male tends to be more active in nest construction. In East Africa, many nests appear to be close to a forest river. Generally, crowned eagles seem to be attracted to the taller trees in the forest. On the Nyika Plateau in Malawi, the favorite nesting trees are the large emergent Aningeria adolfi-friederici and Gambeya gorungosana, and a pair in the Lower Shire used a Sterculia appendiculata tree. In Zimbabwe, Newtonia buchananii are reportedly one of the most used tree species for nesting. Exceptional crowned eagle nests have been observed on sheer cliff faces. In southern Africa, the species nest in drier and denuded terrain than expected such as Adansonia stands on semi-arid hillsides. Despite the relative sparseness of this habitat, these sites have a varied and convoluted terrain, with nooks and crannies, valleys, overhangs and hideaways that allow a crowned eagle to exercise its particular hunting skills. In Kenya, similar fractured landscapes can also be utilized by crowned eagles, such as the black gigantic volcanic rubble fields of Tsavo West National Park, the lower Chyulu Hills, Kibwezi and Soysambu Conservancy. These are jungles of boulders covered with low growth interspersed (in the past) with high trees. A nest built from scratch may take up to 5 months to construct, however existing nests are often repaired and re-used during successive breeding seasons, a process that can take as much as 3 months. It is typical for an eagle pair to use a nest for more than five years and, unlike several other booted eagles, crowned eagle pairs rarely build more than one nest for alternative use. Most large eagles build a very large nest and the crowned eagle is no exception, as it builds one of the largest nests of any eagle. In the first year they build a nest, it may measure 1.5 m (4.9 ft) across and 50 cm (20 in) deep. However, a larger nest, usually after several years of usage, may measure up to 2.5 m (8.2 ft) across and up to 3 m (9.8 ft) deep. The nest consists of both dead and greener branches and has a light coverage of leaves and animal matter. Copulation takes place in the nest, several times a day. Reportedly copulation can occur up to a year before laying, although these may be exceptional cases of mating for non-fertilization purposes (which, in other eagles, has been thought to be related mainly to strengthening pair bonds). A pre-copulation display typically occurs, wherein the male runs repeatedly around the crouching female with wings upraised, which displays the chestnut of the under-wing coverts and beautiful barring.

In South Africa the crowned eagle lays its eggs from September to October; in Zimbabwe, it lays from May to October; mainly nearer to October around the Congo River; anywhere from June to November in Kenya, with a peak in August through October; in Uganda from December to July; and in West Africa, laying peaks in October. The clutch of the crowned eagle either contains 1 or 2 eggs. Often in East Africa, just one egg is laid. Eggs are usually just white, though may sometimes be overlaid with sparse red-brown markings. The eggs are moderate in size, averaging 68.2 mm × 53.6 mm (2.69 in × 2.11 in), with ranges of 60.9–75.5 mm (2.40–2.97 in) in length and 50.8–57.9 mm (2.00–2.28 in) in width. When a natural disaster befalls a nest, a replacement may be made in 2 months time. Incubation lasts for approximately 49 days. 80–90% of egg incubation is done by the female during the day. Food is mainly brought to the nest by the male in the early stages of breeding, though sometimes both sexes may deliver food. The male brings food to the incubating female every 3 to 5 days. When they initially hatch, the young tend to be quite quiet. If two eggs are laid, the younger one dies by starvation after being outcompeted for food by the older one or even directly killed by its older sibling. No nest of wild crowned eagles has been known to successfully produce more than one fledgling, though in captivity two have been known to survive with human assistance (supplementally feeding the younger chick or taking it out of the nest). In cases where the older nestling dies, the younger one may be fed more regularly and survive.

After hatching, the male kill rate rises to one kill every 1.5 days. Pair behavior while raising chicks is very variable, some males are very attentive to their young, while others leave virtually all brooding to the female. After 40 days of age, the young is capable of feeding itself, though is often still fed. The first feathers through the white down emerge when the crowned eagle chick is 40 days old, with the feathers ultimately covering the down in 76 days. After 76 days, the main feather development is in the tail or the wings. Wing flapping begins at 45 to 50 days, increasing after around 75 days. The young fledge at 90 to 115 days, with an average 110.6 days and any period of time less than 100 days is considered unusually soon. On average, male chicks tend to be more active wing-flappers and usually will first fly around 10 days earlier than female chicks. After fledging, females are attentive 95% of the day and brood 50–75% of the day, the amount decreasing slightly with each day. The female does much of the prey capture and a majority of the nest defense after the young fledge. After fledging, the young remain in the neighborhood of the parent's nest and are fed every 3 to 5 days by either parent for their first 270–350 days of life. The rate of food-delivery varies from several times a day to every 3 days on average during the post-fledging period. The fledged juvenile will solicit adults (apparently even unrelated adults) for food but does not actually take the prey unless this occurs around the nest site. The first recorded kill for a young crowned occurred 61 days after fledging, although this is considered exceptionally early by the standards of this species. Flights increase incrementally through the post-fledging period, although the young do not engage in rising flights until they are fully independent. Independence appears to be triggered by the increased indifference of parents to bringing food. Due to the loud vocal interplay between the parents and the fledging eagle, the adults seem to take it as a sign that their offspring has sought independence if they return to the nesting area and hear no begging auditory response. The young eagle usually remains in the care of its parents for a total of up to 11 months after it fledges, longer than is known in almost any other raptor. The advantage of this prolonged stretch to independence is that it may make for a stronger young eagle when compared to other accipitrids which have almost no post-fledging dependency period. In 34 possible cases, 18 resulted in eggs being laid. Fledging success is approximately 83% and almost all young that leave the nest also reach independence. It is estimated that most crowned eagles will reach breeding maturity at around five years old, as is typical for other large eagle species.

== Dietary biology ==
The crowned eagle is often described as the most powerful raptor in Africa, even more so than the two slightly heavier species endemic to Africa, the martial eagle and the Verreaux's eagle (Aquila verreauxii). One listing included the crowned eagle as the only bird in a ranking of the 10 strongest living land creatures (pound for pound). Elsewhere, the harpy eagle is listed as the overall most powerful living eagle and bird of prey. Since there are no known actual tests in any African raptor of the pressure exerted via their grip, as has been done with some other large eagles, their power has been estimated from the size of the feet and talons and from the prey they typically select.

The crowned eagle's staple diet is mostly mammalian. One estimate of the typical prey range posited that the weight range is from 1 to 5 kg (2.2 to 11.0 lb), which is, based on the species ecology in Kenyan hillside woodland. This prey weight range is roughly the same weight range that's typically attributed to martial or Verreaux's eagles. Perhaps unsurprisingly, that is the weight range of the rock hyrax, which all three large eagles are known to hunt regularly in East Africa. In a large collection of bones in the South African Museum, it was found that 51.2% of the bones collected from Nature's Valley in South Africa were from smallish species which weigh under 2 kg (4.4 lb) in adulthood, 26.3% from "medium-sized" species with an adult weight of 2 to 20 kg (4.4 to 44.1 lb) and 22.5% were from larger species with an adult weight of over 20 kg (44 lb). However, about 91% of 87 bones that were from the relatively large antelope species, amongst those that could be accurately sized, were from juvenile specimens. On the other hand, in the rainforest community of Taï National Park in the Ivory Coast, the estimated average weight of prey for crowned eagles was clearly higher at 5.67 kg (12.5 lb). Of all other living eagles, only the female harpy eagle has been credited with an average prey weight range that is comparably high and, at the species level, the crowned eagle's prey size from the latter study is the largest of any known for all extant accipitrids. The crowned eagle is perhaps the only living accipitrid to routinely attack prey weighing in excess of 9 kg (20 lb). According to some authorities typical prey sizes for crowned eagle may be considered to range to at least 20 kg (44 lb) in body mass. Reportedly, the crowned eagle can lift more than its own body weight in flight, though verified accounts of this are sparse.

In a deep forest, an adult eagle may cover a hunting range of up to 6.5 to 16 km^{2} (2.5 to 6.2 sq mi), with the home ranges being smaller for those that inhabit rocky hills and cliffs abounding in hyraxes. Eagles start hunting soon after dawn and mainly kill early in the morning and in the evening prior to sundown. Being a forest-dwelling species, the crowned eagle has no need to travel great distances to hunt, nor employ a great deal of active hunting flight (such as soaring seen in savannah-dwelling species). Rather, it tends to hunt passively. Crowned eagles may locate a suitable hunting spot by listening (such as via the call of the noisy vervet monkey) or watching for prey activity, though may also use habitual hunting perches where they've previously had hunting successes. Although this behavior is unconfirmed, some crowned eagles have been reported to let out a soft whistle, unlike their other vocalizations which, for some reason, is attractive to monkeys and will then attack the first monkey to enter their line of sight. These eagles often still-hunt, wherein they drop or stoop onto prey from a branch perch. Following the sighting of suitable prey, the eagle quickly and stealthily maneuvers itself through the forest towards its prey, a certain element of surprise inherent in its final approach. A majority of the crowned eagle's kills are made on the forest floor. Arboreal prey may be forced to the ground during an attack. The sharp, powerful talons may produce sufficient force to kill the prey on impact; if not, death from trauma or asphyxiation soon follows. Several prey items have been killed by ramming the talons into the skull and penetrating the brain. Having killed on the ground, it has the ability to fly almost vertically upwards to a branch while carrying its prey before feeding, though it will tear up prey into manageable pieces on the ground when it is exceedingly heavy. While they both attack somewhat similar prey in often similar habitat, the considerable difference in body weight and wing-loading between crowned and harpy eagles have been attributed to load-carrying while hunting, as harpies tend to capture and carry off most prey in active flight rather than an attack on the ground and dismember if necessary.

On rare occasions, crowned eagles may also hunt on the wing, flying slightly over the canopy and causing a cacophony amongst monkey groups until they detect and capture their prey, often a monkey or tree hyrax. Crowned eagles are believed to take uneaten portions of prey up into the trees to cache around the nest or habitual perches so that the pieces can be consumed over the course of the next several days. If the prey is too heavy for taking flight with, even after dismemberment, for example, a bushbuck, crowned eagles have been known to cache food at the thickly vegetated base of a tree and only carry limbs to the nest. Pairs may collaborate in capturing prey, with one bird flushing the prey so the other can glide in unseen and ambush it. Female eagles may target male monkeys more often than males, which are more likely to hunt female or young monkeys. In one case, a female crowned eagle stalked a bushbuck calf over the course of two days but was repeatedly foiled when it went in for the attack, either by the mother bushbuck or an associating troop of yellow baboons (Papio cyanocephalus). However, the crowned eagle one day assaulted the bushbuck calf quickly, leaving it with a gaping wound on its flank, and flew off to observe from a distance. Within a few more days, the bleeding, wounded calf was unable to keep pace with its mother and was tracked and killed by the assaulting eagle. Another assault, this one on an adult vervet monkey (Chlorocebus pygerythrus) apparently had a similar outcome as the bushbuck attack. This type of strike-and-wait hunting technique may be used by diverse predators, from Komodo dragons (Varanus komodoensis) to great white sharks (Carcharodon carcharias), which tend to track their victims by scent after biting them rather than sight and sound, but is virtually unprecedented in birds. Crowned eagles have been recorded to consume carrion but this behavior has only rarely been observed.

=== Primate ===
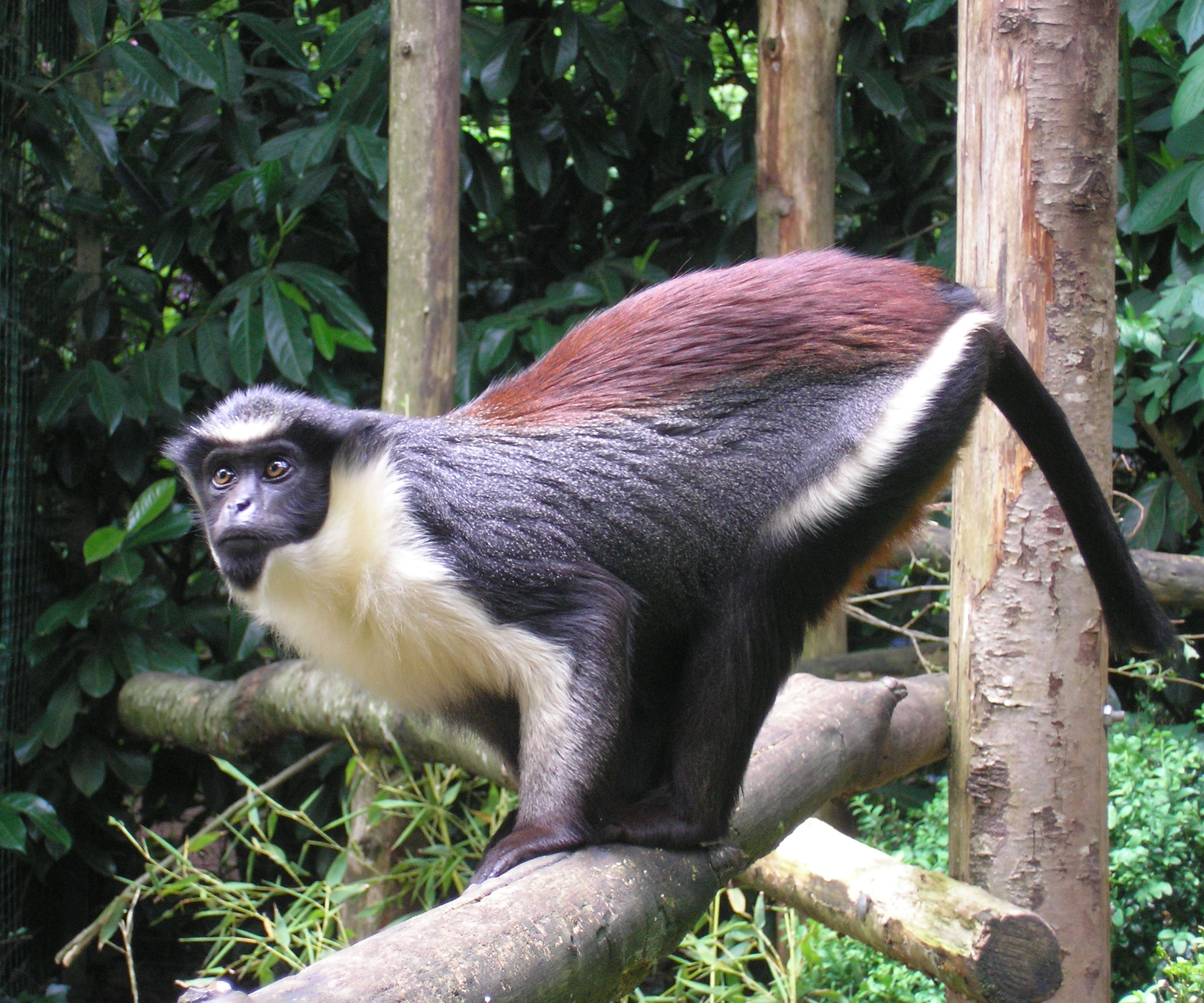
A Diana monkey (Cercopithecus diana), a favored monkey in the crowned eagle's diet

The crowned eagle occupies a unique niche, as it is the only bird in which primates are the most commonly taken prey at the species level. While at least a dozen other accipitrids opportunistically hunt small or young monkeys, only the harpy eagle and, possibly, crested eagle of the neotropics have diets where primates may locally outnumber other prey. However, New World monkeys are generally smaller and less formidable than Old World monkeys. Also, both other eagles may prefer different prey where available: harpy eagles primarily take sloths, which can be as heavy as a colobus or mangabey but are much slower and less able to defend themselves, while crested eagles take a variety of tropical birds and arboreal mammals. Other large eagles have been confirmed to hunt adult Old World monkeys, including martial eagles, Verreaux's eagles, mountain hawk-eagles and Philippine eagles, whose generic scientific name and old common was even the monkey-eating eagle, but all are believed to rely on non-primate prey for the majority of their diet.

The favored group in the crowned eagle's diet is certainly the genus Cercopithecus. In Kibale National Park, Uganda, the red-tailed monkey (Cercopithecus ascanius) was the most represented prey species, making up 40% of the remains. Larger monkeys, such as western red colobus (Piliocolobus badius), mantled guereza (Colobus guereza) and grey-cheeked mangabey (Lophocebus albigena) were secondary in the prior study and, altogether, primates made up 82.2% of the remains from two nests there. A total of 88% of the remains found around crowned eagle nests in the Ituri Rainforest in the Democratic Republic of the Congo were from primates: blue monkey (Cercopithecus mitis), red-tailed monkey, Wolf's mona monkey (C. wolfi), western red colobus and a mixture of mangabeys and black-and-white colobus. In 16 nests in the Ivory Coast's Taï Forest, more than 60% of remains around the eyries were monkeys and more than 45% of remains were from Cercopithecus monkeys. About half of the Cercopithecus remains were from Diana monkey (C. diana; 44 items from 28 adults and 16 immatures), with the other half from Campbell's mona monkey (C. campbelli) and lesser spot-nosed monkey (C. petaurista), which were indistinguishable as remains. Other represented monkeys in the Taï Forest included the Western red colobus, the olive colobus (Procolobus verus) and the king colobus (Colobus polykomos). The diet is, by necessity, more diverse in Kiwengwa/Pongwe Forest Reserve in the Matumbi Hills of Tanzania but the blue monkey was still the most represented prey species, making up 20% of the remains. In one nest in the prior study, the Blue monkey made up more than 90% of the remains. Where they overlap in range, the vervet monkey can be quite prominent as prey for crowned eagles, as their relatively small size, diurnal and terrestrial habits may make them more vulnerable.

Struhsaker and Leakey found that among both small and large species, adult male monkeys were often better represented in the diet than adult females. This may be a result of the behavior of male primates. In some species, only adult males often travel separately from social groups, only adult males take aggressive action against eagles, and only adult males have loud calls that may attract the attention of eagles. The variation in behavior of primates is illustrated so that in red colobus species, in which adult males patrol in mixed groups, the males are rarely attacked; meanwhile in the black-and-white colobus, in which adult males often patrol alone, males are regularly attacked and killed by crowned eagles. However, adult monkeys (52%) were found in almost equal measure as juvenile monkeys (at 48%) in Uganda.

As various species and ages of primates are taken, primate prey varies in size. All diurnal African monkeys weigh in excess of 2 kg (4.4 lb) in adulthood. African primates weighing under 2 kg (4.4 lb), are almost entirely arboreal and nocturnal. However, such primates, are actually allies of lemurs rather than monkeys, may occasionally also be hunted by crowned eagles. Potto (Perodicticus potto) are notable secondary prey in the Tai Forest and various galagos have been found across the range, such as in the Kiwengwa/Pongwe Forest Reserve where they made up 7.5% of the remains. Although no one has seen the eagles catch these primates, it is thought pottos and galagos are likely to be taken if discovered by an eagle while sleeping in dense foliage during the day. Among monkeys, Cercopithecine monkeys are on the small side. Full-grown female Cercopithecus can range in average weight from 2.7 to 4.26 kg (6.0 to 9.4 lb) and males from 4.1 to 6.9 kg (9.0 to 15.2 lb) depending on species. Other major prey, such as vervet monkeys typically weighing 5.5 kg (12 lb) in males and 4.1 kg (9.0 lb) in females, but up to 8 kg (18 lb). Mangabeys and most colobus monkeys are larger, weighing considerably in excess of 5 kg (11 lb) at maturity. The adults of these species taken by crowned eagles usually weigh 10.5 kg (23 lb)in males and 7 kg (15 lb) in females, but olive colobus are smaller, weighing less than 5 kg (11 lb), and large adults of western red colobus and Sooty mangabeys can weigh up to 11–12 kg (24–26 lb). Larger king colobus, mantled guereza and black-and-white colobus can weigh up to 13.5 kg (30 lb) in adult males. Based on observation and literature, any monkey of a weight of up to 10 to 15 kg (22 to 33 lb) may reportedly be hunted.

The crowned eagle's diet may extend to the young and juveniles of baboons and similar species. yellow baboons, olive baboons (Papio anubis), chacma baboons (P. ursinus), drills (Mandrillus leucophaeus) and mandrills (M. sphinx), all falling into the above maximum primate weight bracket and all have been successfully hunted. In South Africa, remains of three adults or subadult chacma baboons were found in the nest remain, suggesting adult female or subadult baboons can be possibly preyed upon. In many cases, baboons and drills may be actively avoided, as the adult males of these species, at up to twice as heavy as the female, are probably invulnerable to hunting and tend to be notoriously violent-tempered. In one case, olive baboons destroyed the nest of a crowned eagle pair after one of the eagles killed a baby in the baboon group. When experimentally exposed to an image of a crowned eagle, a dominant male mandrill reacted aggressively towards it, implying that they will keep eagles at bay to protect the more vulnerable members of their troop. The crowned eagle is considered a potential predator of infant chimpanzees (Pan troglodytes) and bonobos (P. paniscus), although this is unconfirmed. Although rarely observed, some monkeys will "bait" crowned eagles, which harass and provoke them. Leslie Brown described Sykes' monkeys (Cercopithecus albogularis) as rarely baiting eagles "with the insolent impunity of an expert torero with a bull".

=== Ungulate ===
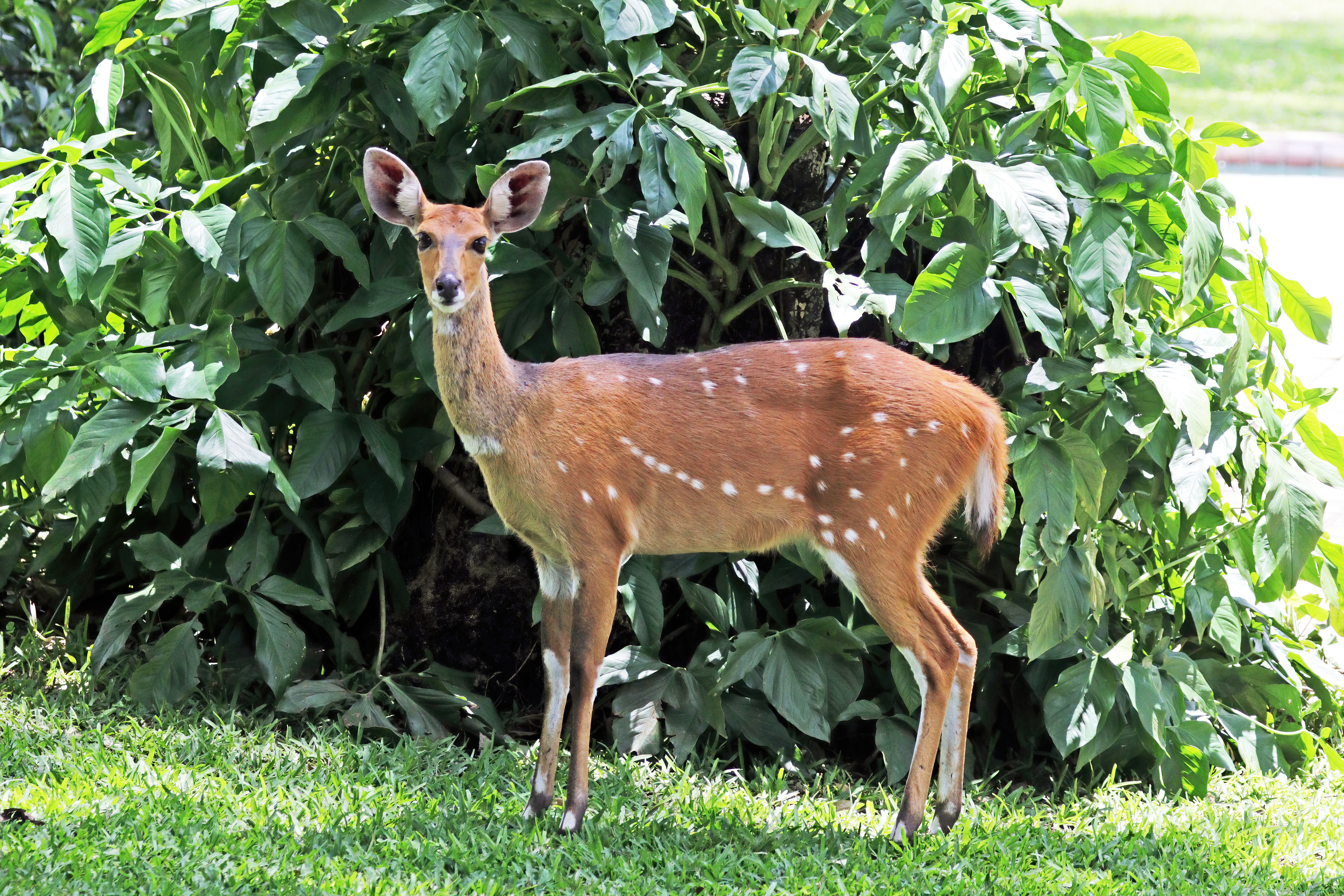
A full-grown female bushbuck (Tragelaphus scriptus) is the largest animal known to be hunted by crowned eagles.

Outside of the rainforest, the crowned eagle's diet tends to be somewhat more diverse. While they may take monkeys on a relatively small scale, other families, largely the small antelopes and suids (specifically, the red river hog (Potamochoerus porcus)), are the leading prey. In some wooded hillside nests in Kenya, about half of the remains were from small antelope. The predominant prey species there is the Suni (Neotragus moschatus). In the Matumbi Hills of Tanzania, antelope make up about 30% of the dietary intake at nests, much of this being the Suni again. Adults antelope of a similarly small size to the Suni, around 5 kg (11 lb) or slightly less, are readily hunted, such as Kirk's dik-dik (Madoqua kirkii) and the blue duiker (Philantomba monticola). Larger antelopes are also taken, mainly calves but occasionally adults weighing around or more than 10 kg (22 lb) can be taken, including klipspringer (Oreotragus oreotragus), steenbok (Raphicerus campestris), Cape grysbok (R. melanotis), Sharpe's grysbok (R. sharpei) and about a half dozen small to medium sized duikers, especially the red forest duiker (Cephalophus natalensis) and larger common duiker (Sylvicapra grimmia). National Geographic recorded a video depicting a crowned eagle stalking a water chevrotain (Hyemoschus aquaticus) (the only African representative of a small-bodied, deer-like family) along a rainforest river but show the chevrotain evading the eagle by submerging and swimming away from it. Even bigger bushbuck and greater kudu, mainly calves, are sometimes preyed upon regularly. Among accurately weighed bushbuck to be killed by a crowned eagle, some scaled 15.9 kg (35 lb), 20 kg (44 lb), or even 28.8 kg (63 lb) and 30 kg (66 lb) respectively in case of young ram, which about up to eight times the eagle's weight. Crowned eagles are known to hunt fawns of other largish antelopes including Thomson's gazelle (Eudorcas thomsonii), grey rhebok (Pelea capreolus) and impala (Aepyceros melampus), and trained eagles from re-introduction programme managed to kill adult female impalas and bushbucks.

The taking of ungulates on a large scale, unlike primates, is not unique to the crowned eagle. The martial eagle was reported in Tsavo East National Park to hunt mainly dik-diks and elsewhere has exceptionally killed large duiker weighing up to 37 kg (82 lb). Equally or even more impressive feats of ungulate-hunting have been credited to the wedge-tailed eagle (Aquila audax) and especially the golden eagle, despite these being considered less powerful than the crowned eagle. Both Aquila take mainly neonatal lambs and deer fawns but can attack adult sheep and other large prey (i.e. full-grown kangaroos, emus, pronghorns, reindeer, etc.). Even a bald eagle (Haliaeetus leucocephalus), usually target aquatic preys, was reportedly witnessed killing a pregnant adult sheep ewe. The largest prey attacked by any living raptor is probably the up to 114 kg (251 lb) domestic calves attacked and killed by golden eagles.

=== Other prey ===
Hyraxes are known to be a major source of prey outsides of the rainforest. All six currently recognized species of hyrax have been hunted by crowned eagles. The greatest level of predation for this family has been directed at Southern tree hyrax (Dendrohyrax arboreus), but when they become locally abundant, rock hyrax (Procavia capensis) can become the species' preferred prey. Other mammals have been recorded as opportunistic prey, including bats, hares (Lepus sp.), springhares (Pedetes sp.), cane rats (Thryonomys sp.), giant pouched rats (Cricetomys sp.), sun squirrels (Heliosciurus sp.), African giant squirrels (Protoxerus sp.), brush-tailed porcupines (Atherurus sp.), four-toed elephant shrews (Petrodromus tetradactylus) and tree pangolins (Manis tricuspis). Despite their obvious defenses and nocturnal habits, small Cape porcupines (Hystrix africaeaustralis) have reportedly been taken in South Africa. These assorted mammals, generally smaller than primates and ungulates, are typically taken when preferred prey species are locally scarce. Mammalian carnivores are sometimes also hunted ranging from smaller types such as yellow mongoose (Cynictis penicillata), banded mongoose (Mungos mungo), cusimanses, African palm civet (Nandinia binotata) or genets to larger varieties such as adult African wildcats (Felis lybica) and black-backed jackals (Canis mesomelas).

Adult eagles will only resort to hunting large birds when mammals are scarce, but in southern Africa, they can be a fairly common component of the diet. Bird prey can include guineafowl, francolins, ibis, pigeons, ostrich chicks (Struthio camelus) and the fledglings of herons and storks. One nest even had the remains of a marabou stork (Leptoptilos crumeniferus), which is a formidable species not usually susceptible to avian predators. Hornbills may be the most widely represented bird in the diet and the black-casqued wattled hornbill (Ceratogymna atrata) reacts strongly to both the call of crowned eagles and the alarm calls of monkeys specified to the eagles (which are separately identifiable from the monkey's leopard-related alarm calls to both humans and, apparently, hornbills). In Kenya, snakes, including venomous varieties, may regularly supplement the diet. Monitor lizards may also be hunted and, as in the martial eagle, the crowned eagle may attack even the largest African monitors, the adult Nile monitor (Varanus niloticus) and the rock monitor (V. albigularis).

Domestic animals, including chicken (Gallus gallus domesticus), turkeys (Meleagris gallopavo), cats (Felis catus), small to medium-sized dogs (Canis familiaris), small pigs (Sus domesticus), lambs (Ovis aries), and goats (Capra hircus), are taken only when wild prey is greatly depleted. Juveniles and subadults, may take unconventional prey more frequently than adults.

=== Interspecies conflicts and mortality ===
In the rainforest interior, the crowned eagle occupies a unique niche and it is, by far, the largest and most dominant raptorial bird in such areas. Other large predators that may exploit similar prey in the same forested habitats include leopard (Panthera pardus), African golden cat (Profelis aurata), Nile crocodile (Crocodylus niloticus), dwarf crocodile (Osteolaemus tetraspis), African rock python (Python sebae), chimpanzee and larger monkeys, like mandrill and baboons. All of these competitors are much heavier bodied than a crowned eagle, ranging in size from the 10 kg (22 lb) golden cat to the 225 kg (496 lb) Nile crocodile. While the reptiles usually hunt on the ground or near water, felids, large monitor lizards and baboons can be assured thieves who will climb trees and take crowned eagle kills. In a comparison of the monkey-based diets of rainforest crowned eagles with leopards and chimpanzees, the big cat was estimated to take prey averaging 11.27 kg (24.8 lb), about twice the average estimated prey weight for crowned eagles in the same ecosystem, and the great ape 6.9 kg (15 lb), about a kilogram more than that of the crowned eagle. In South Africa, it is reported that Cape porcupines and bushpigs (Potamochoerus larvatus) are attracted to trees used for prey consumption by crowned eagles, in order to scavenge the sinew and bone that's discarded to the ground. In more mixed eastern and southern habitats, the diversity of large predators is higher and the crowned eagle, despite its great power, is not assured at the top of the avian food chain. Amongst the more formidable raptors, the martial, the Verreaux's, and the crowned eagles, may live on the same hillside and all hunt hyraxes. While the Verreaux's eagle is something of a rock hyrax specialist, the martial eagle, even more so than the crowned eagle, has an extremely broad prey base. All these eagles will readily steal the prey caught by the other raptors. However, the great eagles are segregated by both their habitat preferences and main hunting techniques, which make it possible for the species to successfully nest within a few kilometers of one another. While the crowned eagle lives in denser woods and hunts from a perch, the martial eagle tends to live in more open wooded savanna habitats and tends to hunt on the wing at a high flying height (thanks to its superb vision) and the Verreaux's eagle lives in precipitous mountain habitats and tends to contour-hunt, hugging the uneven contours of the rocks while flying, only a few meters high. Like the martial eagle, the crowned eagle has been known to prey on smaller raptorial birds.

Young and inexperienced crowned eagles may be killed as prey by large carnivores. Two eagles reintroduced into the wild were killed by predators, one by a leopard that surprised a male on a monkey kill in the rain, and the other by a crocodile that took a female as she ate a young bushbuck kill near the water's edge. In Kenya, cases of predation on nestlings and fledglings have reportedly involved honey badgers (Mellivora capensis) and cobras. In one extraordinary case, an adult male Sanje mangabey (Cercocebus sanjei), estimated to weigh 10 to 12 kg (22 to 26 lb), attacked an adult female crowned eagle that was trying to hunt his troop, jumping onto her back when she was in mid-flight and killing her with a strong bite. This is the first confirmed instance of a monkey killing an adult crowned eagle. In one case, a female who tried to hunt an adult female baboon was found seriously wounded after a male baboon interceded, though the eagle was captured, medically treated, and lived in captivity. In another case involving potential prey turning the tables, an eagle that was trying to hunt an incubating female Egyptian goose (Alopochen aegyptiacus) was quickly attacked by her mate, who flew at the eagle and bit repeatedly at it, causing the eagle to quickly withdraw. The average life expectancy for crowned eagles is 14 to 16 years, although some specimens live more than 30 years.

== Relationship with humans ==
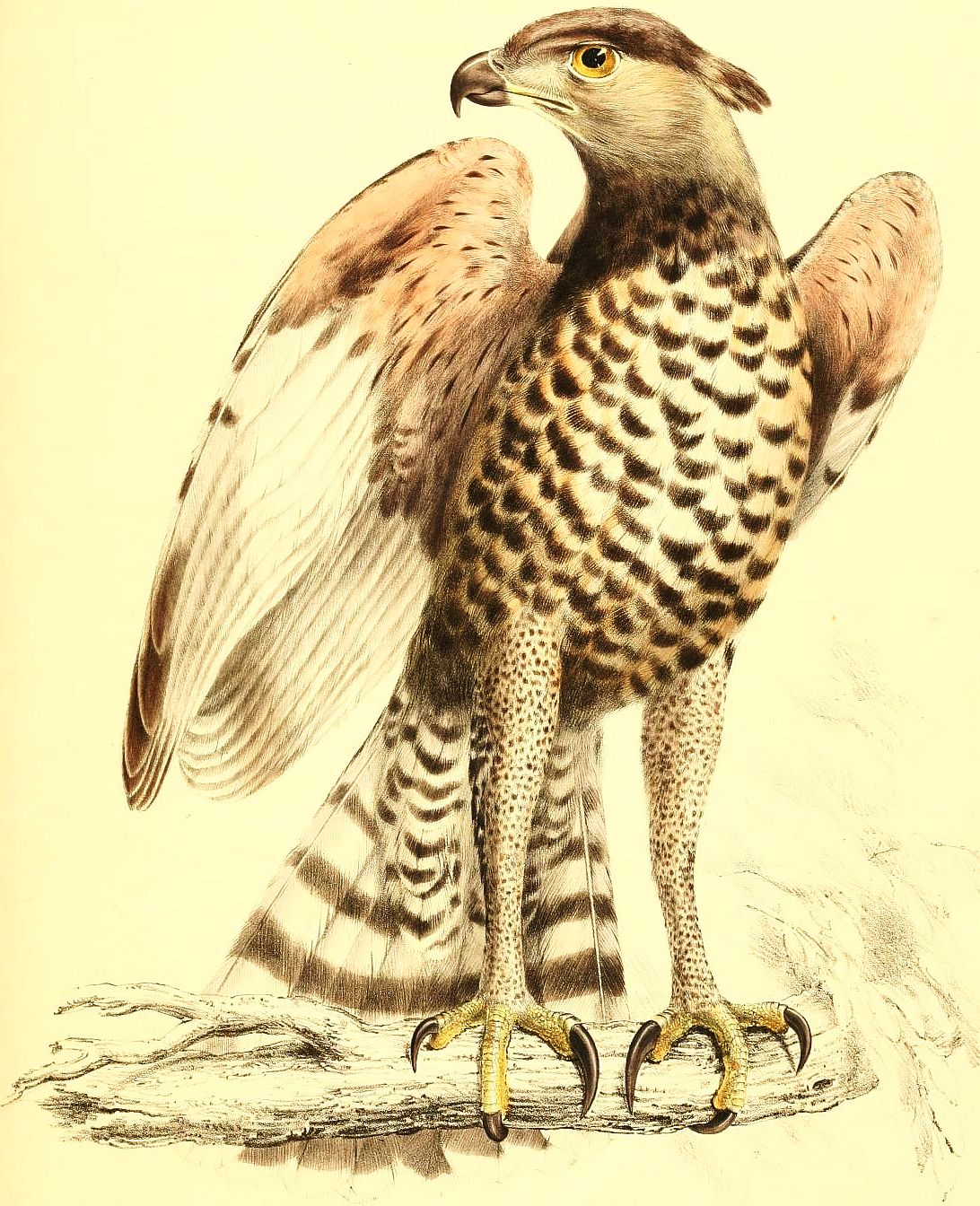
Early illustration of a young female crowned eagle

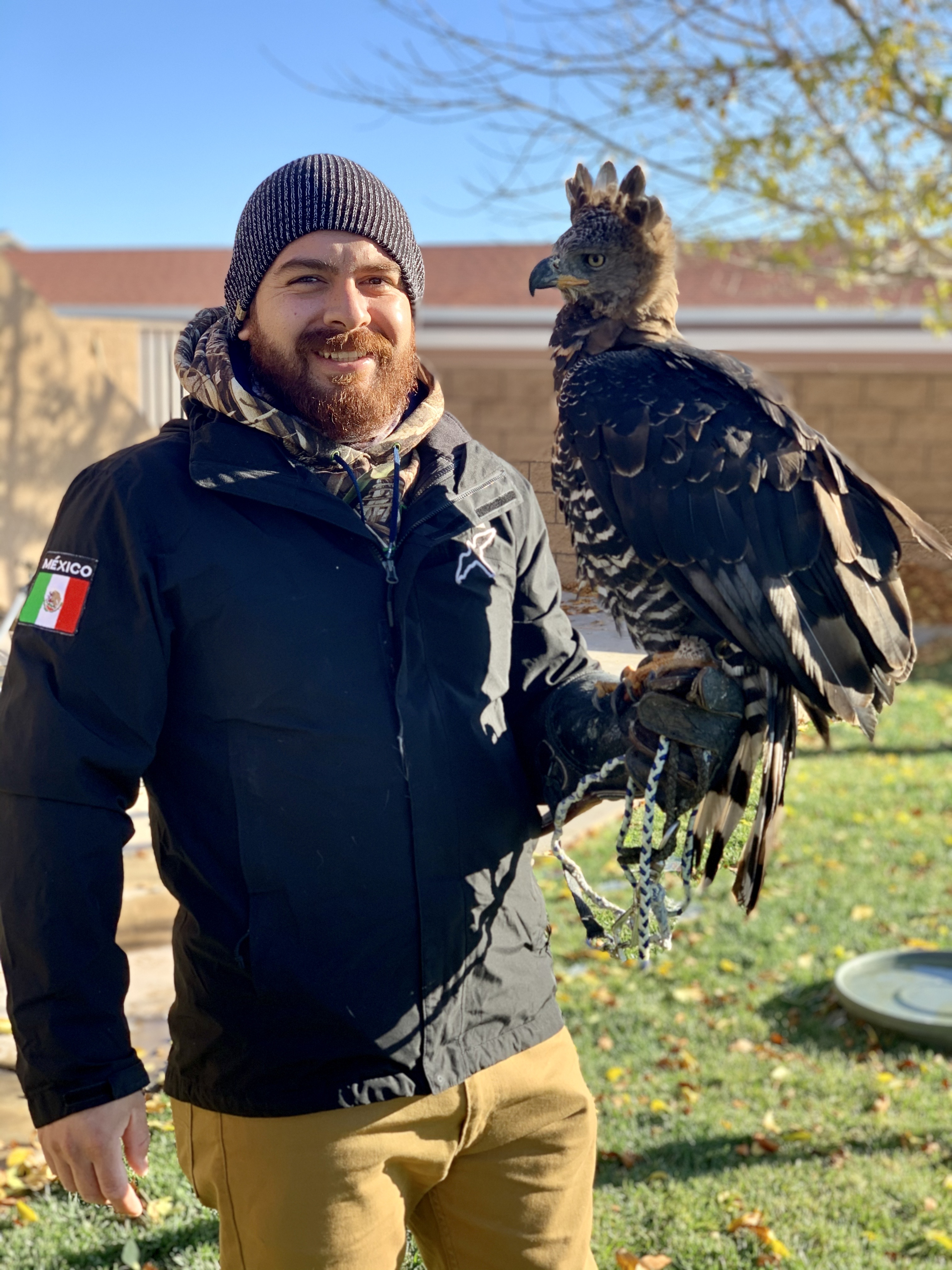
In captivity, showing size

=== Attacks on humans ===
While several smaller raptorial birds will attack humans if they come too close to the nesting site, usually these have minor consequences for the human victim. Mother crowned eagles, in the post-fledging stage, readily attack any human who comes close to the nest. Adult males may also attack humans before fledging but only do so rarely. Despite the size and power of the eagle, attacks by the eagles may have minor consequences as well since the attacks are meant only to displace and not kill or seriously maim the intruding animal. However, nest-defense attacks may nonetheless possibly result in deep, painful, open wounds, which can lead to risk of infection or the need for stitches.

The crowned eagle is perhaps the only extant raptorial bird which has been believed to attack human children as prey, outside of few exceptional circumstances in the case of the Wedge-tailed eagle and the Martial eagle. In one case, a 7-year-old boy, of a weight of approximately 20 kg (44 lb), was ambushed by a crowned eagle, who gouged its talons through the boy's throat and chest. The attack was ended by a woman who came upon them and rescued the child by bludgeoning the eagle to death with a hoe. In another case, the skull of a human child was found in the nest of a crowned eagle pair. In yet another instance, when assisting in the investigation of the disappearance of a four-year-old girl, Simon Thomsett came to believe she was the victim of a crowned eagle after the severed arm of a child was found in a tall tree that was inaccessible to leopards and known to be used as a crowned eagle cache.

One other living eagle, the martial eagle (Polemaetus bellicosus), has been confirmed to take a human child in a possible predation attempt, a four-year-old boy in Ethiopia. Unlike the crowned eagle, the martial eagle is not a specialized primate hunter, and preys mainly on large ground-dwelling birds. The eagle in question attacked three children, killing one of them, before being shot by a villager. In the famed Taung deposit in South Africa, a skull from a child Australopithecus africanus, a possible ancestor of human beings, led to considerable speculation. Ultimately referred to as the Taung Child and estimated to weigh 9 to 11 kg (20 to 24 lb), the child became the type specimen for its species. The child appeared to have died from a clean row of piercing to its skull. Scholarly examination of the piercings has led scientists to believe that the specimen was seemingly killed by an eagle, of which the crowned eagle is the most likely candidate. This predatory relationship has led to much hypothesizing as to whether Stephanoaetus eagles may have partially shaped human evolution, with small early primate ancestors having evolved towards larger body sizes and larger brains due to the reduced probability of eagle predation with these features.

=== Conservation status ===
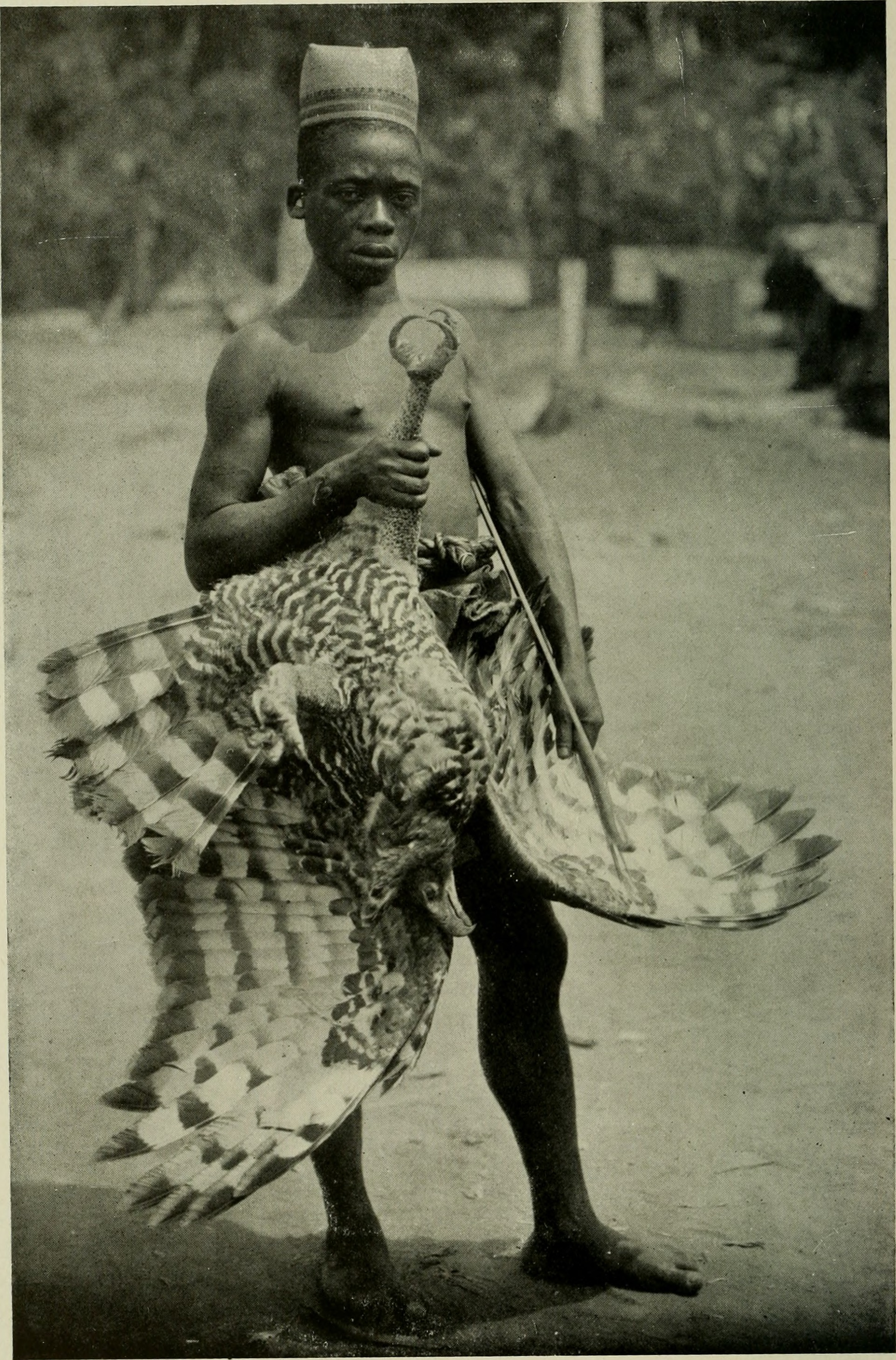
A native Makere in the DRC holds a dead adult crowned eagle.

The crowned eagle is fairly common in suitable habitat, though at the population level, its numbers have shown a decline in sync with deforestation. Declines appear to be widespread and may be increasing due to the often fevered pace of clear-cutting. This species main habitat is rich, high-canopy forest, which is a major target of timber companies, agriculturists, palm oil and biofuel plantations and miners as well as slash and burn farmers. A charcoal-based economy outdoes mineral-based economics in Democratic Republic of the Congo and Zaire, both fuel wars and makes inroads deep into previously virgin forests. As two of central Africa's largest businesses, this has a devastating effect on forests and wildlife. Charcoal taken from Kenya and Ethiopia is often thought to finance Somali warlords. Tanzania, which is more heavily developed for agriculture (largely today for biofuel) than adjacent Kenya, has even more reduced forest habitat. The crowned eagle is far more common in protected areas and reserves than elsewhere in its range, though is still recorded consistently outside of these areas. Biologists in Africa now suspect that the crowned eagles adaptability to small, fragmented tracts of woodland has been exaggerated in the past. Some habitat losses have been offset by the establishment of exotic tree plantations, where this species can nest, but which generally lack a sufficient prey base. The crowned eagle in Ethiopia is certainly at very low density and restricted to protected areas. It may be obliged to utilize exotics stands, but it is unlikely to ever be capable of surviving in the complete absence of indigenous (and thus prey productive) forests. Certain southern African countries, such as Zambia, Zimbabwe and Malawi, have almost no extensive stands of native forest today, while other countries such as Namibia were never heavily forested. In 2012 the species status was changed to Near Threatened by the IUCN. Like the martial eagle, the crowned has throughout modern history been persecuted by farmers, who maintain that the bird is a threat to their livestock. In fact, both the crowned and martial eagles only rarely attack livestock. In some cases, however, crowned eagles have actually been killed while attempting to hunt domestic animals. Another cause for persecution of the species is that crowned eagles are considered competitors in the illegal bushmeat and poaching trades. Within the forest land-locked countries of Africa, the bushmeat trade is the largest source of animal protein for humans. It is a multibillion-dollar business with some 5 million tons (mostly small antelopes and monkeys, the crowned eagle's staple diet) being killed each year. In just 500 million acres of the Congo Basin owned by 8 countries the weight equivalent to 40.7 million humans is removed each year (or 740,000 bull elephants). The effect of this unsustainable culling is to severely depress or remove the large, medium and small wildlife species of the forests. Crowned eagles require some 430 kg (950 lb) of "bush meat" a year and thus directly compete with the industry. The red colobus, a monkey that typifies the optimal forest quality and is a main food species for crowned eagles, has been singled out as one of the fastest declining and most endangered monkeys in the world due primarily to the bushmeat trade. In some cases, crowned eagles have reportedly even been shot by primate conservationists in a misguided attempt to mitigate their predation of declining primate species. It is estimated that 90% of the global distribution of the crowned eagle may be subject to habitual persecution or is even killed and eaten itself as bushmeat. On the other hand, some educated foresters and fruit-growers actually encourage protection of populations, due to the controlling effect crowned eagles have on populations of potentially harmful mammals. In April 1996 the world's first captive-born crowned eagle hatched at the San Diego Zoo. Among ISIS registered zoos, only San Diego Zoo, San Francisco Zoo, Los Angeles Zoo, Fort Worth Zoo and Lowry Park Zoo house this species. Several wildlife rehabilitation centers in Africa house crowned eagles. Due to their high-strung dispositions, tendency for aggression towards humans and resistance to hunting prey via coercion and hunger, the crowned eagle is often considered to be poorly suited for falconry. However, there are several eagles of this species used as such in England and sometimes in Africa, where they have been reportedly used to cull locally overpopulated feral dogs.
