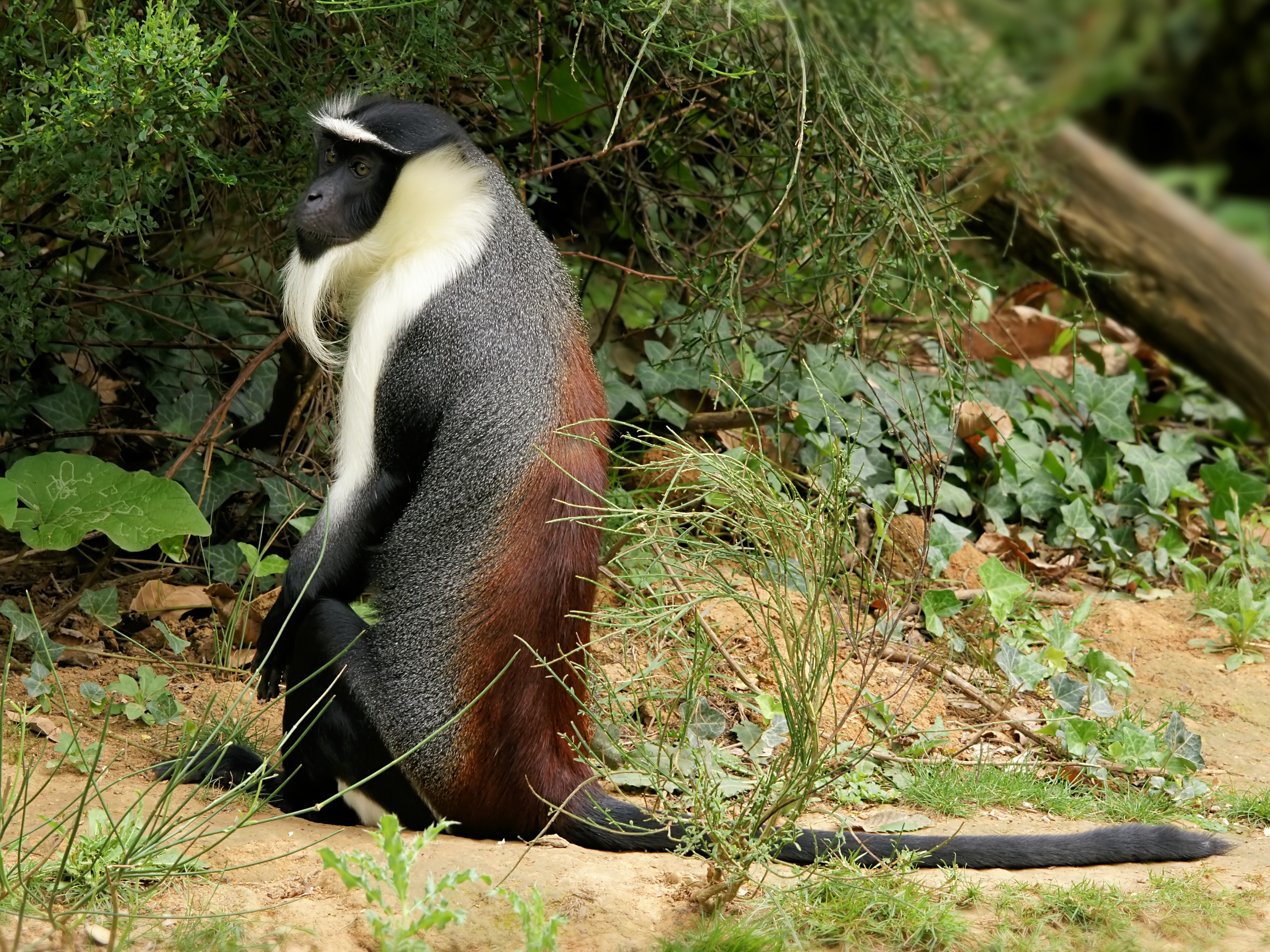
- Roloway monkey at La Vallée des Singes

Conservation status
- Critically Endangered (IUCN 3.1)
- CITES Appendix I

Scientific classification
- Kingdom: Animalia
- Phylum: Chordata
- Class: Mammalia
- Order: Primates
- Family: Cercopithecidae
- Genus: Cercopithecus
- Species: C. roloway

Binomial name
- Cercopithecus roloway (Schreber, 1774)
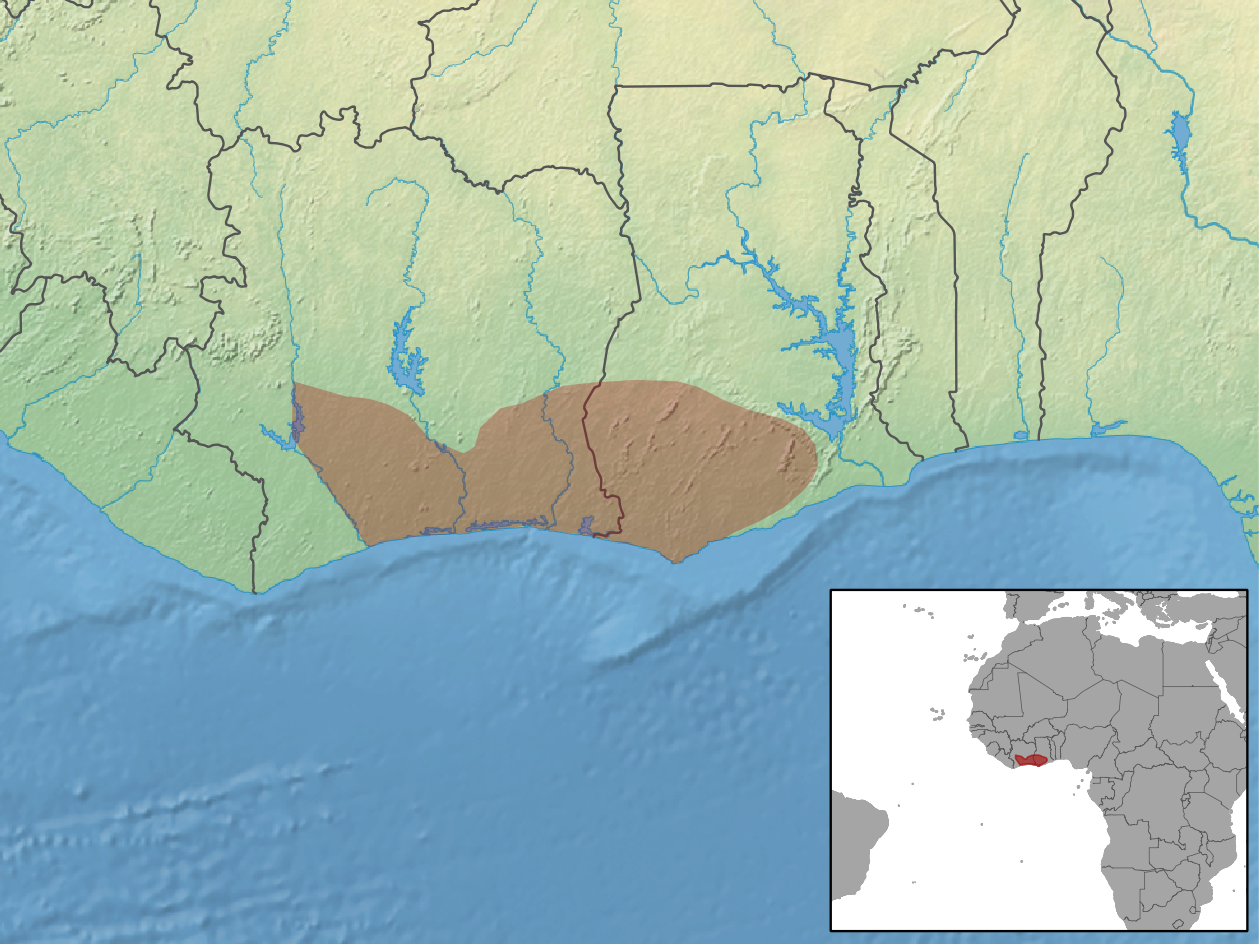

Synonyms
- Cercopithecus diana ssp. roloway (Schreber, 1774); Simia roloway Schreber, 1774

= Roloway monkey =

Species of monkey

The Roloway monkey (Cercopithecus roloway) is an endangered species of Old World monkey endemic to tropical West Africa. It was previously considered a subspecies of the Diana monkey (C. diana). The species is classified as critically endangered due to habitat loss and their continued hunting because of the bushmeat trade. The Roloway monkey is mainly an arboreal species, for the most part inhabiting forests in Ghana and some reserves in south-eastern Côte-D'Ivoire. More specifically, C. roloway is primarily concentrated in the Tanoé Forest of the Côte-D'Ivoire because of their heavy threats to extinction and lack of habitat. Gathering data on wild subjects is still difficult, as they have low and vanishing populations in a vast forest, but they are a unique species.

== Taxonomy ==
Both C. diana and C. roloway were originally categorized under the well-known species group: diana, which meant that the two monkeys were related subspecies. This classification changed in 2005, when each monkey was considered its own species and treated as such. This is beneficial to each species in relation to conservation efforts and justifications for necessity of conservation. Finding funding for extreme conservation efforts can be challenging, and when C. diana and C. roloway were considered related subspecies, the urgency for conservation may not have been as great. Individuals can find themselves more willing to support conservation of a unique species rather than a subspecies.

== Description ==
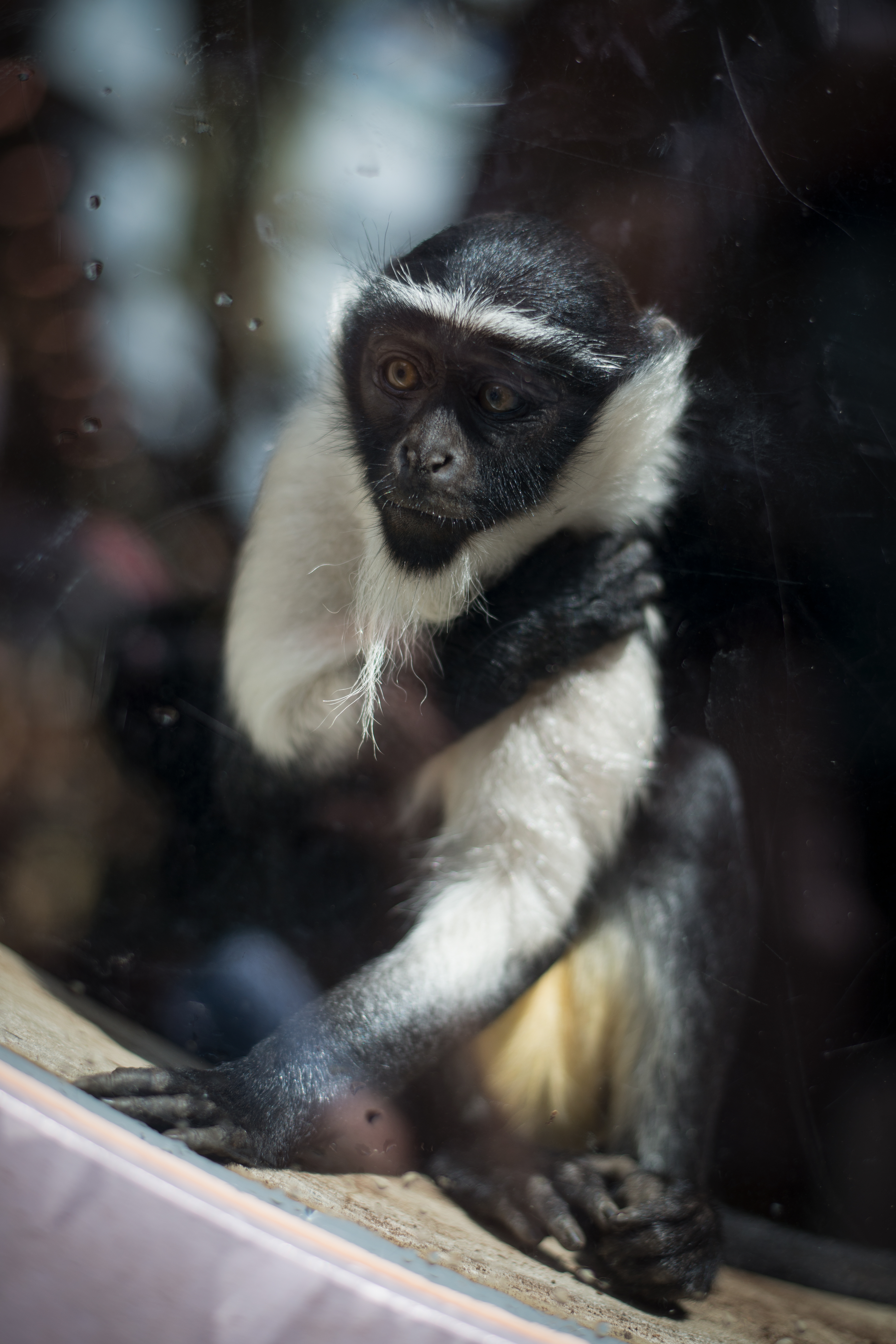
At Ouwehands Dierenpark

The Roloway monkey is a species of guenon monkeys, the largest of all of the 26 African Cercopithecus species. Of this genus, it is most similar to C. diana; they both have dark fur surrounding a majority of their bodies, with a dark brown-reddish patch on their lower back. The Roloway monkey has a prominent white beard under its black chin, and above its dark eyes is a horizontal white stripe of fur, directly on its brow bone.

Its face is a dark black, accentuated by the bright white fur covering its shoulders and chest. This monkey has a relatively flat skull, and unlike many other primates, does not have an elongated chin cavity, also referred to as a rostrum. In addition, the nostrils of the monkey are closely set and they angle downwards. Its chest and throat are bright white, and the monkey has a white line of fur that runs along each outer thigh. On the inside of the thighs, the fur can range from white or yellowish to red or brown. It has an exceptionally long tail, longer than its entire body. Not many body measurements of adult Roloway monkeys are available, but through analysis, but compared to the Diana monkey, the Roloway monkey's body length ranges from 40 to 55 cm (16 to 22 in), and the tail ranges from 50 to 75 cm (20 to 30 in) long.

Male monkeys weigh about5.0 kg (11.0 lb). The females weigh only about 2.5 kg (5.5 lb). The Roloway monkey has a distinct cheek pouch, which it shares with all Cercopithecus monkeys, that allows it to store food such as fruits, nuts, and seeds, which are the majority of its diet; they are omnivorous, though. The Cercopithecinae monkeys all have opposable thumbs, which are quite well-developed; the Roloway monkey also has fingernails on all of its fingers. Finally, the Roloway monkey has a lifespan similar to those of other primates, ranging from 20 to 30 years.

== Distribution and habitat ==
The species occurs in a small area of eastern Ivory Coast and the forests of Ghana, between the Sassandra and Pra Rivers and may occur in Burkina Faso and Togo. The Roloway monkey inhabits the canopy of secluded, old-growth forests, including gallery forests, in moist, low-lying regions, and avoids but can make use of forests that have been lightly logged. It cannot live in areas where humans have had a large impact. Primary forests have unique attributes that can allow populations of animals and plants to be more stable in the long term. They are very lush, containing thick vegetation that allows for easy hiding. The habitats of the Roloway are very complex and have many hiding places, making studying them or gathering any new information on the changes in their population size or behavior difficult.

== Ecology ==
=== Diet ===
The Roloway monkey is an omnivorous species, feeding on both plants and animals. These primates consume various fruits, flowers, leaves, and even insects. Because insects are included in its diet, the Roloway also can be described as insectivorous. It searches for large invertebrates, and consumes both larvae and eggs. It can feed on roughly 130 species of trees, climbers, and epiphytes. Like many omnivores, the Roloway monkey also consumes mature fruit pulp, arthropods, oil-rich seeds, and young leaves.

The diet of the Roloway monkey has been observed for quite some time; presumably, the monkey varies its diet in accordance with the season. It consumes more fruit and pulp during the dry season of the year. During the wet season, when more insects are out and available for hunting, the Roloway consumes less fruit and seed and more insects. When hunting for food, the Roloway monkey looks for the most direct path and may not choose to swing, climb, or jump from branch to branch if it is not the most efficient means of food collection.

=== Predation ===
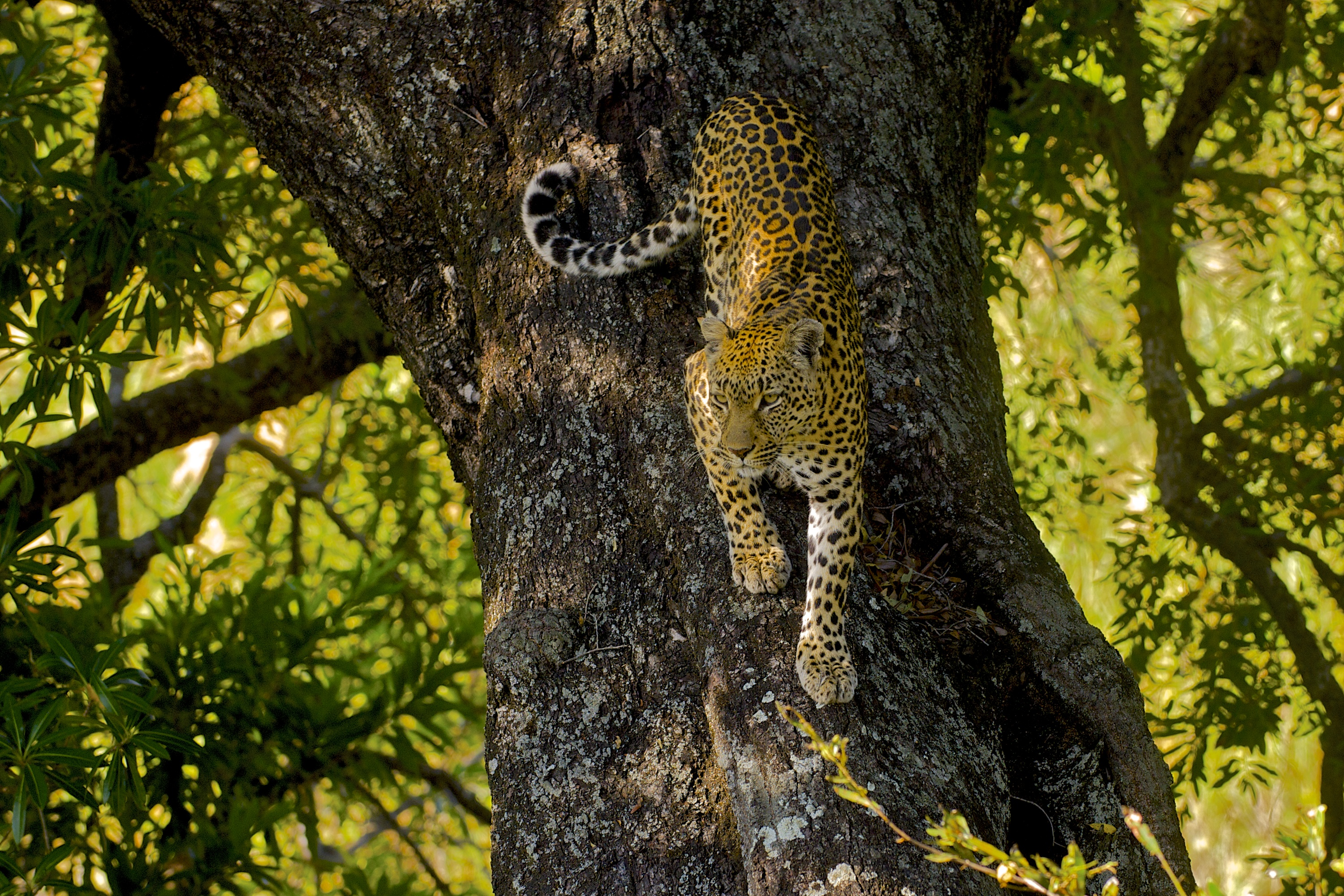
A common predator of the Roloway monkey: the African leopard

The Roloway monkey does not often employ its "fight" instinct, rather it chooses "flight". Typical predators of the Roloway monkey include the leopard, large predatory birds, chimpanzees, and other larger species. To survive against these predators, the Roloway monkey uses communication techniques such as warning sounds, or even signals, to tell the other members of its group that a threat is near, and they must flee to safety. Predators, though, are not the primary cause for the decline in overall population or the critically endangered assessment it has been given.

== Behaviour ==
Roloway monkeys typically are diurnally active only, so spend the night sleeping high in the canopy, similar to other primates. The species forms social groups of around six to 30 individuals, typically with a single male, up to 10 females, and their offspring. Males may change between groups, while females generally stay with the same group into which they were born. When populations of the Roloway are reduced, the habits of staying in the same group can impose restrictions on the ability for populations to recover. Most of the monkeys' day is spent searching for food, and during rest time, they take time to groom one another, play, and care for their young, thus forming and strengthening bonds. The rest period allows the young to learn and grow mentally. In addition, the Roloway monkey is social and interacts with other monkeys in the same areas.

=== Communication ===
Many primates are known to have very advanced methods of communication. The Roloway monkey is no exception, as it has many different types of calls and sounds it makes based on the situation. The monkey is known to croak, chuckle, and shriek, and even makes distinct yelling sounds when it senses a threat and wants to warn the others in the group. Another frequent call the males of the haram make is known as a gathering call; it lets the females and juveniles of the group know that they should return to their home range, near the male. Many individuals also perform physical communications, including facial expressions, posture, hand signals, and even actions. The eyebrows of the monkey can indicate the emotion it is trying to portray. Raised eyebrowsare used to show threatening signals. Also, staring is used to show dominance and threats. Finally, the mouth and teeth are used to show either dominance or submission, and different mouth movements or shapes can mean different things. When showing teeth in a smile, the monkey is usually submissive, but when growling and wide open, with a pushed-out jaw, the monkey is showing aggression. Within groups, levels of hierarchy exist, and distinct communication, both physical and verbal, is needed to maintain peace and reduce tension and fighting. Grooming, then, becomes essential, as it allows for stronger bonds and sharing of information to occur.

=== Reproduction ===
Much of the information about reproduction for the Roloway monkey is based on knowledge of the closely related Diana monkey. While they are different species, their reproductive behavior is very similar. The Roloway monkey is polygynous; one male acts as a leader in the group and sires the young. Females have an estrous cycle of 30 days, at any point in the year. Males mate with females during a 3-day estrus. Females normally give birth to a single infant or rarely twins, after a gestation period around six months. The female monkey is the primary caretaker, though siblings or unrelated female monkeys may help to care for the newborn. The mother suckles the infant for about six months, as it then adapts feed it a more adult-like diet. A Roloway monkey reaches maturity around 3–4 years of age. A young male typically seeks out a new group that he can join or forms a new group to reproduce with unrelated females. The lifespan of a Roloway monkey is about 20 years in the wild, while individuals in captivity may live for more than 30 years. Captives typically go through hormonal changes that restrict their ability to effectively mate and reproduce, but if the conditions match those of their home habitats, they can reproduce as they would in the wild.

== Conservation ==
=== Threats ===
The Roloway monkey was assessed as an endangered species by the IUCN in 2008. As their population continued to rapidly decline, and the hunting and habitat loss continued, the species was moved up to critically endangered, so conservation is more needed than ever. In addition to this title by the IUCN, the Roloway monkey is one of the top three most threatened monkeys on the west coast of Africa. Other sources have suspected that the Roloway is in fact the top most threatened primate in the entire continent of Africa.

=== Conservation efforts ===
The Roloway monkey is now considered one of the top 25 most critically threatened primates in the entire world. Conservation efforts must be taken immediately to save this species. Recognition for how threatened the species is great, but not much action is being taken. CITES labeled the species as Class A of the African Convention of Nature and Natural Resources, but many issues with policy making are happening in the countries where Roloway monkeys live. Due to these issues, laws rarely are properly enforced against the poaching of this species. Some small foundations have started in areas surrounding the Tanoe Forest and other locations where the monkeys have been found, but without government help, the organizations probably will not go far. Large conservation programs are trying to aid in the revival of this species, through captive breeding and other methods. Unfortunately, the species has hit a point where this breeding is not extremely successful, as the monkeys do not have anywhere to be released. Currently, without new locations where the primates could thrive, breeding programs have allowed only for a larger captive populations. In 2020, the United Kingdom had a large celebration for the first-ever birth of a Roloway monkey in that country. Though current breeding programs exist all over the world, and while many have not been largely successful, this is a small win. Breeding programs have had struggles because the monkeys can have a difficult time adapting to one another and are not entirely willing to breed, and relatively few are in captivity, so breeding is quite selective. Such inbreeding depression is unfavorable and could worsen the conservation status of the species.
