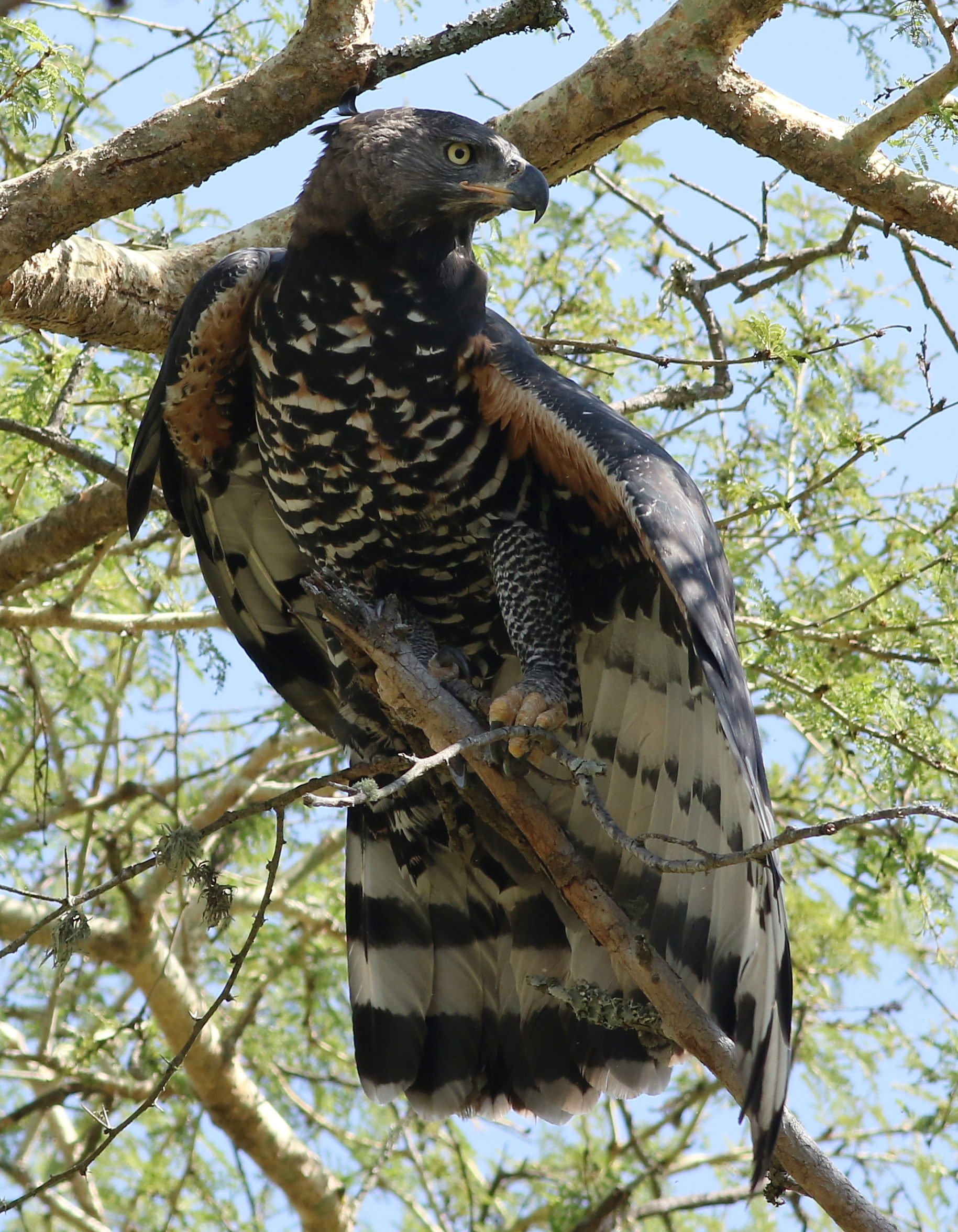
- Crowned eagle (Stephanoaetus coronatus)

Scientific classification
- Kingdom: Animalia
- Phylum: Chordata
- Class: Aves
- Order: Accipitriformes
- Family: Accipitridae
- Subfamily: Aquilinae
- Genus: Stephanoaetus; W.L. Sclater, 1922

Type species
- Falco coronatus Linnaeus, 1766

Species
- Stephanoaetus coronatus; †Stephanoaetus mahery

= Stephanoaetus =

Stephanoaetus Temporal range: Holocene

Genus of birds

Stephanoaetus is a genus of very large birds of prey from Sub-Saharan Africa and Madagascar. Only one of the two known species is extant.

== Species ==
- Crowned eagle or crowned hawk-eagle (Stephanoaetus coronatus).
- † Malagasy crowned eagle or Madagascar crowned hawk-eagle (Stephanoaetus mahery).
