= Malagasy crowned eagle =

Malagasy crowned eagle Temporal range: Holocene

Conservation status
- Extinct (1500)

Scientific classification
- Kingdom: Animalia
- Phylum: Chordata
- Class: Aves
- Order: Accipitriformes
- Family: Accipitridae
- Genus: Stephanoaetus
- Species: †S. mahery

Binomial name
- †Stephanoaetus mahery Goodman, 1994

Extinct species of bird

The Malagasy crowned eagle (Stephanoaetus mahery), also known as the Madagascar crowned hawk-eagle, is an extinct large bird of prey endemic to Madagascar.

It has been proposed that this bird, combined with elephant bird eggs, were the source of sightings of the mythical Roc.

== Description ==
It may have been comparable in average size to the related African crowned eagle, but possibly slightly larger, with the largest female weights estimated at up to 7 kg (15 lb), or about the size of a large female golden eagle.

== Ecology ==
It probably fed on lemurs. The raptor avoidance behaviour exhibited by contemporary adult lemurs may have originated in response to this (and another now-extinct Malagasy Aquila) eagle; extant Malagasy raptors appear to be a threat primarily to juvenile members of the large diurnal lemur species.

It was perhaps an apex predator of the Malagasy forests, along with the giant fossa and the Voay crocodile. It likely became extinct in the 16th century due to human overhunting of its prey.

== See also ==
- Haast's eagle, another large island eagle species that became extinct after the arrival of humans
