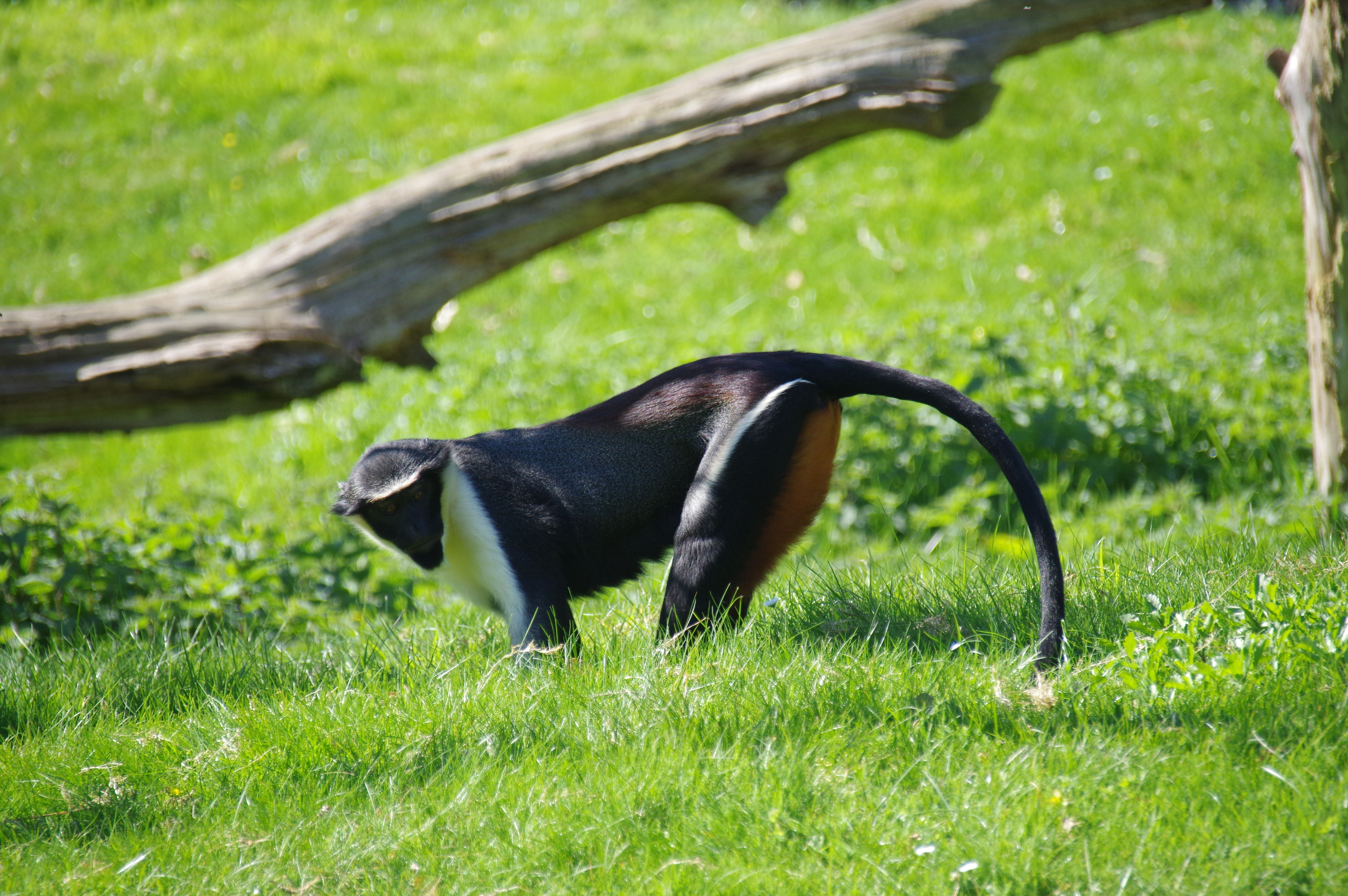
- Diana monkey at the Zoo de la Bourbansais

Conservation status
- Endangered (IUCN 3.1)
- CITES Appendix I

Scientific classification
- Kingdom: Animalia
- Phylum: Chordata
- Class: Mammalia
- Order: Primates
- Family: Cercopithecidae
- Genus: Cercopithecus
- Species: C. diana

Binomial name
- Cercopithecus diana (Linnaeus, 1758)
- Combined geographic range of Diana monkey (western half) and roloway monkey (eastern half)

Synonyms
- Simia diana Linnaeus, 1758; Simia faunus Linnaeus, 1758

= Diana monkey =

Species of Old World monkey

The Diana monkey (Cercopithecus diana) is an Old World monkey found in the high canopy forests in Sierra Leone, Liberia, and western Côte d'Ivoire Named for its white brow, which is said to resemble the bow of the Roman goddess Diana, this black-grey guenon has a white throat, crescent-shaped browband, ruff, and beard.

== Taxonomy ==
Two taxa formerly considered subspecies of the Diana monkey have recently been elevated to full species status; the Roloway monkey (C. roloway) is found in Côte d'Ivoire and Ghana, and the Dryas monkey (C. dryas) is found in the DR Congo.

== Distribution ==
This species can be found in West Africa, from Sierra Leone to Côte d'Ivoire.

== Habitat ==
The Diana monkey is found in primary forests and does not thrive in secondary forests. The species is regarded as endangered by the IUCN, as well as by the United States Fish and Wildlife Service, the chief dangers to them being habitat destruction (they are now virtually confined to coastal areas) and hunting for bushmeat.

== Description ==
The Diana monkey ranges from 40 to 55 cm (16 to 22 in) in length, excluding its tail, which is of a uniform 3–4 cm diameter, and 50–75 cm (20–30 in) long. Adults weigh from 4–7 kg (8.8–15.4 lb).

They are generally black or dark grey, but have a white throat, crescent-shaped browband, ruff, and beard; the browband gave the species its common name, since it was held to resemble the crescent on the brow of the goddess Diana. The monkeys' underarms are also white, and they have a white stripe down their thighs, while the backs of their thighs and their lower backs are a chestnut colour. Apart from the browband, ruff, and beard, and some fringes on their limbs, their fur is rough and tough.

== Biology and behavior ==
Healthy Diana monkeys may live for up to 20 years. This species is active during the day and feeds at all levels of the canopy, rarely venturing down to the ground for fear of predation. Diana monkeys retreat to the upper levels of the trees at night, though they do not make nests, preferring to sleep on branches. They feed mainly on fruit, blossoms, and leaves, as well as occasional insects and other invertebrates. The monkeys, in turn, are preyed upon by various animals, including the crowned hawk-eagle, African leopard, common chimpanzee, and humans.

The Diana monkey is a noisy presence in the forest. Its marked coloration allows a wide range of visual social signals. Females produce specific alarm calls, alert calls, and greeting/contact calls, depending on the occasion; in moments of predatory threat, they use distinct calls based on the specific predator around, with some research suggesting that the vocabulary of the females' vocalisations is larger and more variable than that of the males.

Other forest residents, such as the yellow-casqued hornbill (in addition to other birds) and other primates, are able to discriminate between these and use them to take appropriate action, should a mutual threat be present in the immediate area. A similar system is observed in India with the axis deer (or chital) on the ground and the Hanuman langur in the trees above them; the two species are seemingly inseparable, living in near-symbiosis as the forest's carnivore "warning system". The deer make shrill barks and calls if they spot a tiger, leopard, dhole, or wolf; the monkeys (likewise) scream and alert the deer of any potential threat, and in turn, their commotion alerts every animal within the area.

Diana monkeys communicate both to local group members and distant competitors with different kinds of alarm sounds. They produce loud noises to make other monkeys aware of leopards or other competitors in their area.

Groups consist of a single male with a number of reproducing females and their infants. In good conditions, adult females reproduce annually. Gestation lasts about 5 months, and the young nurse for a further 6 months. Normally, only a single infant is born. Although the young are born in a fairly well-developed condition, with open eyes and able to grasp their mothers, at least in zoo conditions, Diana monkey mothers appear anxious and possessive, rarely letting young infants leave them. As infants grow, however, they become very playful. Juveniles reach sexual maturity around 3 years old. Daughters remain in their mothers' social groups, while males leave their natal groups shortly before attaining sexual maturity.

== Human relevance ==
Like most primates, Diana monkeys can carry diseases that can be communicated to humans, such as yellow fever and tuberculosis. Native tribes in the tropical forests of West Africa poach Diana monkeys, which are sold as luxury meat or seen as a commodity.

== Gallery ==
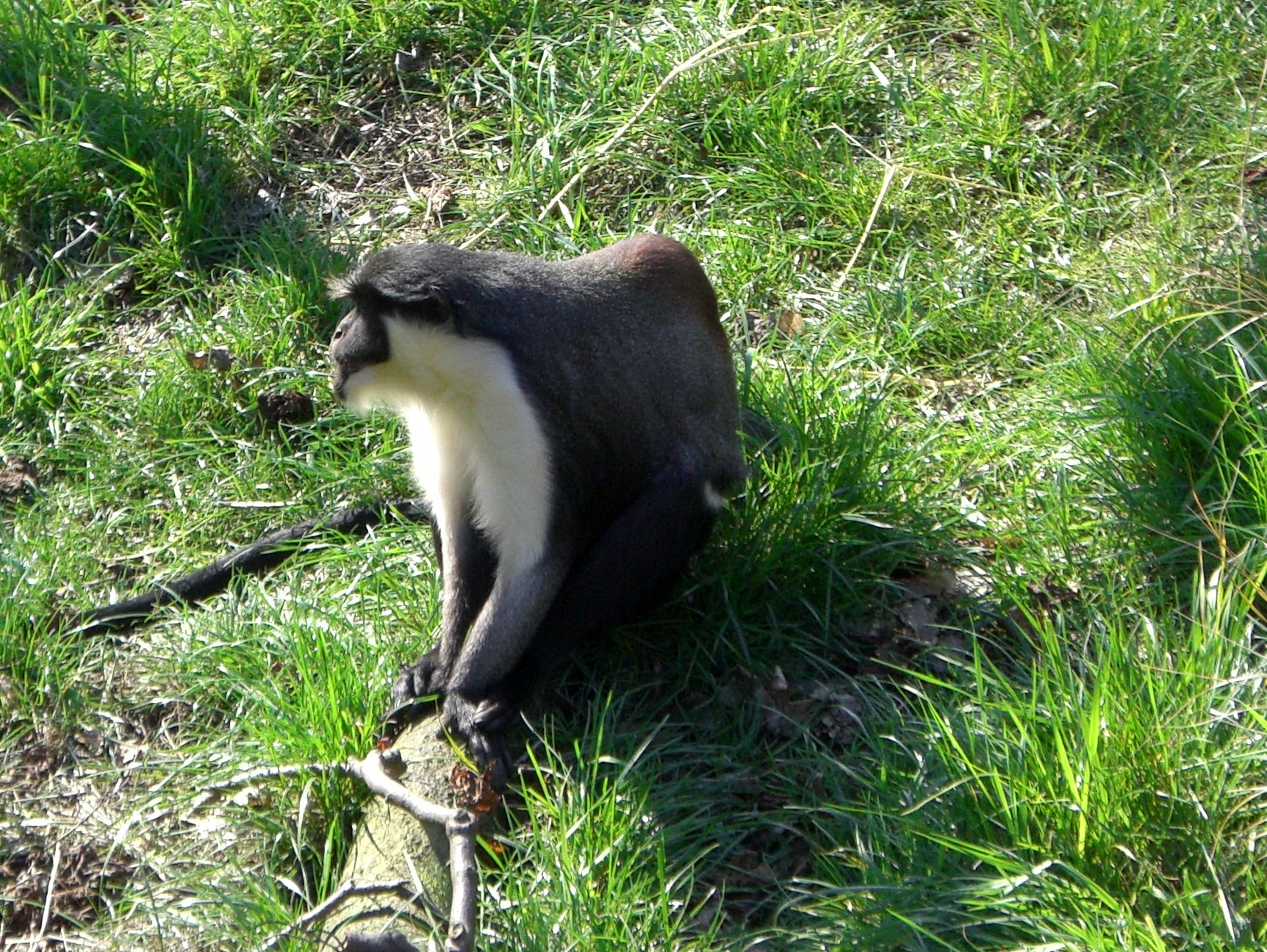
A Diana monkey seen in profile

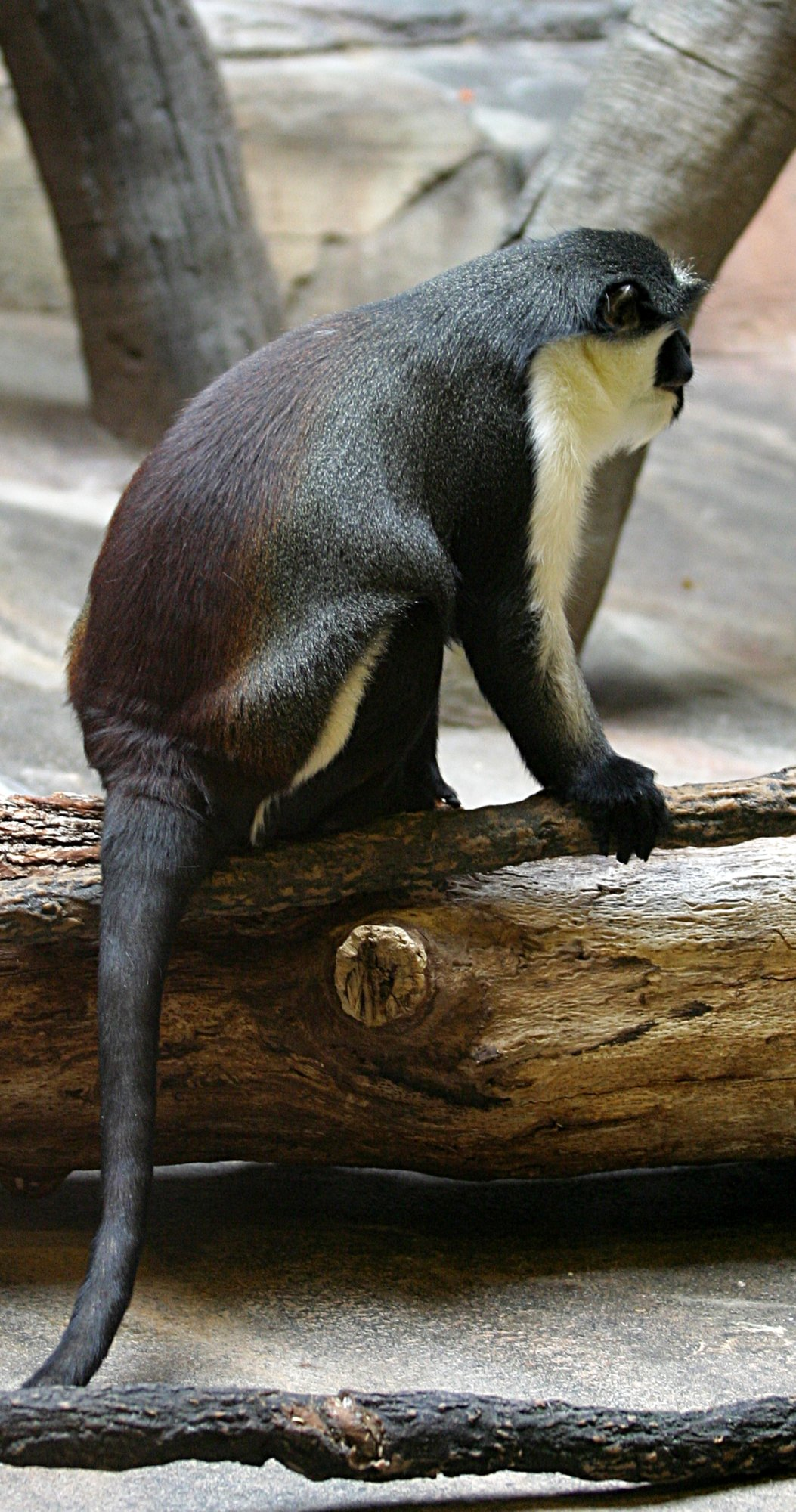
Diana monkey at the Henry Doorly Zoo

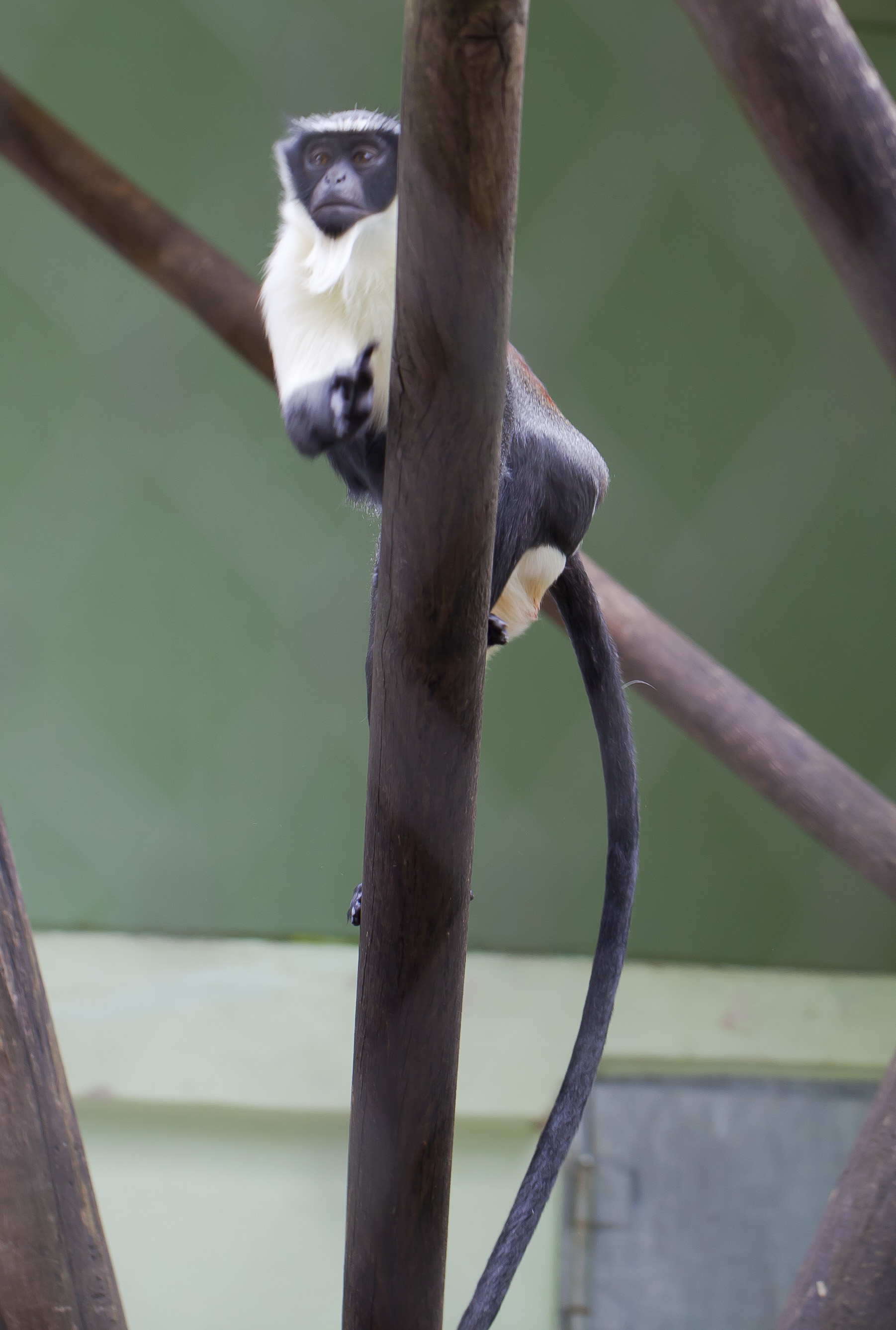
Exemplar in Munich Zoo

Cercopithecus diana in Singapore Zoo, video clip
