= Kiwengwa/Pongwe Forest Reserve =

- Location within Tanzania
- Location: Unguja, Tanzania
- Coordinates: 6°00′11″S 39°22′08″E

The Kiwengwa/Pongwe Forest Reserve is located on the northeast coast of Unguja, 20 km from Zanzibar Town. The reserve is an important biodiversity spot in the coral rag zone. The forest reserve is rich in both infaunal and floral species. The faunal species reported from the reserve are: Endemic species of red colobus monkey, Aders's duiker, sykes, blue monkeys, Sunni antelope and several species of snakes. The avifauna species consist of 47 bird species, which includes Fischer's turaco, Zanzibar sombre greenbul, crowned hornbill and white-browed coucal. There are 100 plant species which includes many medicinal species. There are also coral caves within the reserve where stalactites and stalagmites can be seen. There is also a spice plantation near the reserve. Coral rag forest, a sensitive ecosystem, is under threat due to timber extraction since the 1970s. Conservation measures have been undertaken to preserve the rich biodiversity of the reserve. Inside the Kiwengwa/Pongwe Forest Reserve, there is also the Mchekeni Coral Caves which are a bird and bat sanctruary. They are open to tourists who are interested in seeing the natural wonders of these caves which are bustling with wildlife from pythons, to bats and whip spiders.
