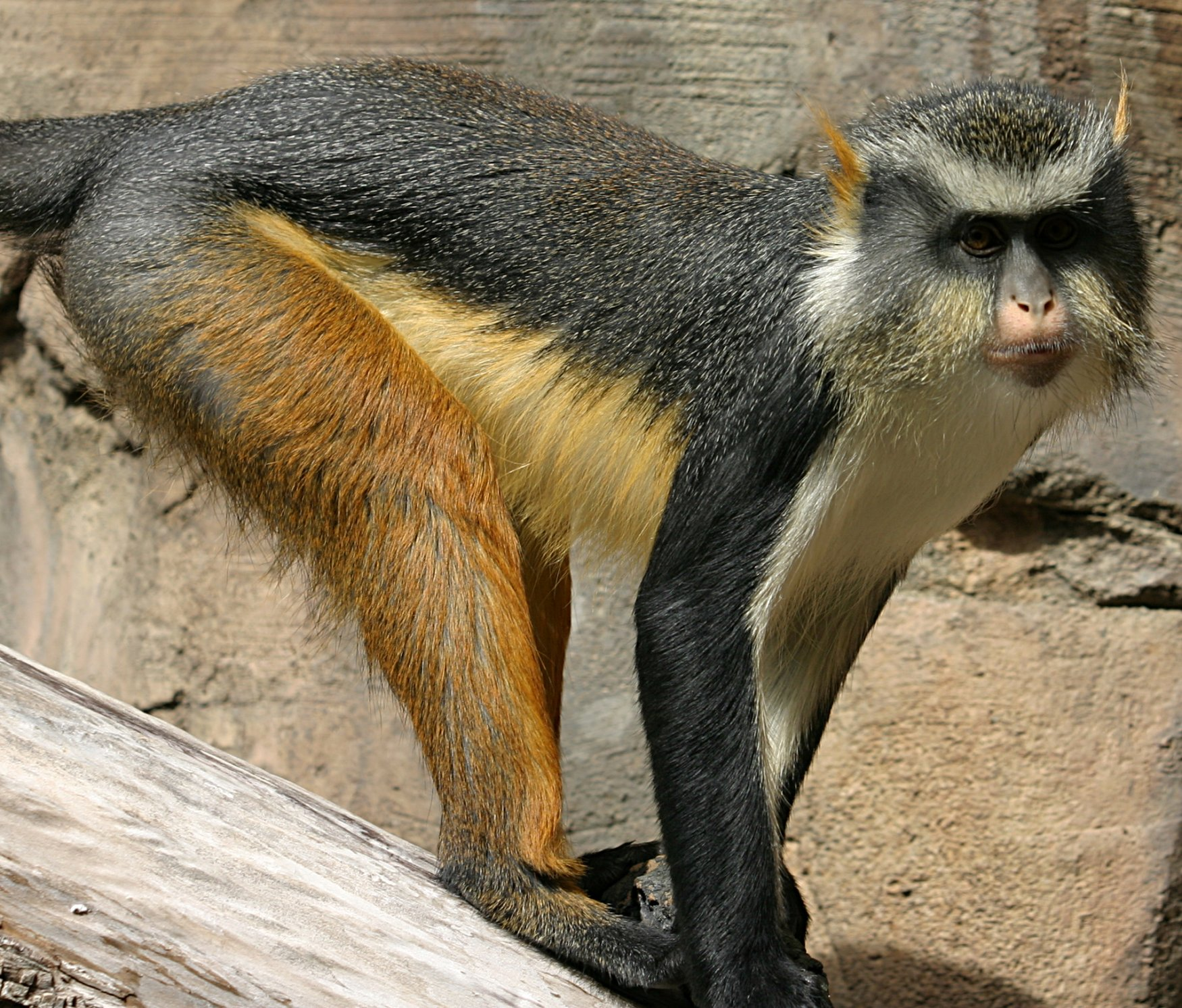
- Wolf's mona monkey at the Henry Doorly Zoo

Conservation status
- Near Threatened (IUCN 3.1)

Scientific classification
- Kingdom: Animalia
- Phylum: Chordata
- Class: Mammalia
- Infraclass: Placentalia
- Order: Primates
- Family: Cercopithecidae
- Genus: Cercopithecus
- Species: C. wolfi

Binomial name
- Cercopithecus wolfi (Meyer, 1891)

= Wolf's mona monkey =

Species of Old World monkey

Wolf's mona monkey (Cercopithecus wolfi), also called Wolf's guenon, is a colourful Old World monkey in the family Cercopithecidae. It is found in central Africa, primarily between the Democratic Republic of the Congo and Uganda. It lives in primary and secondary lowland rainforest and swamp forest.

== Taxonomy ==
The species was first described from a living specimen in the Zoological Garden at Dresden. It was brought in 1887 by Dr Ludwig Wolf from somewhere in central west Africa. The species was described in 1891 and named after the collector. This specimen died in October 1891 and the skeletal characteristics were described in 1894.

Wolf's mona monkey is in the C. mona grouping within the genus Cercopithecus along with Campbell's mona monkey, Dent's mona monkey, Lowe's mona monkey, the mona monkey, and the crested mona monkey. Wolf's mona monkey was previously considered a subspecies of the crested mona monkey. The genus Cercopithecus is part of the subfamily Cercopithecinae along with baboons, mangabeys, and macaques. This subfamily shares several common traits such as cheek pouches, low and rounded molar cusps, and simple stomachs; all adaptations to a frugivorous diet.

Wolf's mona monkey has two subspecies which are separated by a large area of swamp forest:

- C. wolfi wolfi, found between the Congo and Sankuru Rivers.
- C. wolfi elegans, found between the Lomami and Lualaba Rivers

== Physical characteristics ==
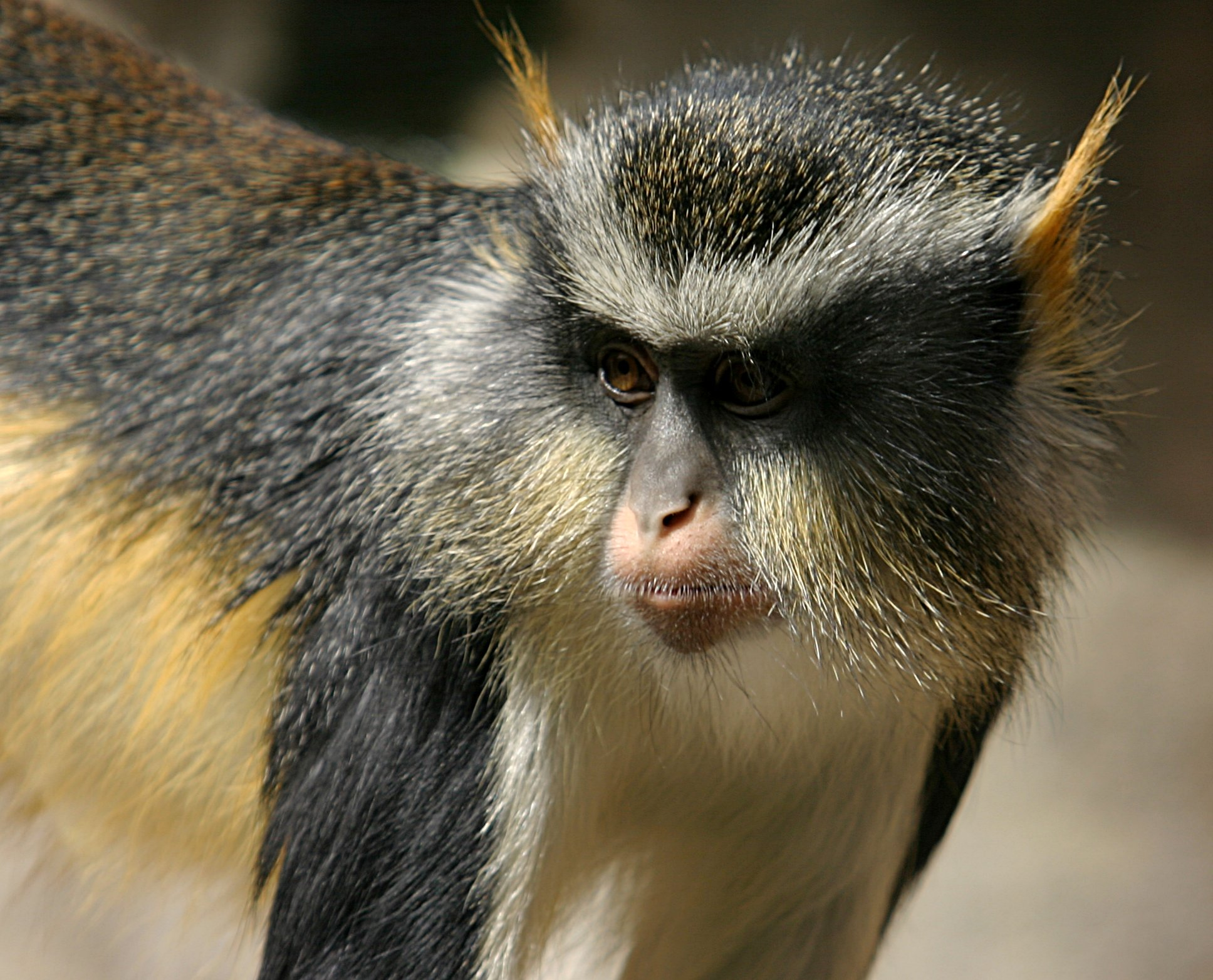
Facial close-up

Guenons, the largest group of African primates, are very colorful. Their color is used in intraspecific communication for recognizing individuals, species, and potential mates. Wolf's mona monkey is dark grey with a red "saddle" on its back. The pelage depends on the subspecies. C. wolfi wolfi has a chestnut-colored patch on the middle of its back. Its arms are black and legs are red. It has a yellow underside, occasionally with an orange stripe down its flanks. Its cheek whiskers are yellow, speckled with black, and its ear tufts are red. C. wolfi elegans has a back which is gradually browner towards the rump. Its forearms are black, and its upper arms have a pale speckling. Its legs are light gray, while its underside is white. Its cheek whiskers are white, with dark speckling that increases near the base. Its ear tufts are white. The male's scrotum is blue. Wolf's mona monkey is also sexually dimorphic in size. Males weigh, on average, almost twice as much as females, 4.5 kilograms (10 lb) and 2.5 kilograms (5.5 lb) respectively. Its small size makes it susceptible to predators, especially the crowned eagle and the leopard.

== Behaviour ==
=== Diet and feeding ===
The diet of Wolf's mona monkey differs depending on location. Although predominantly a frugivore, it may also forage for seeds and insects for protein. Since it has no adaptations for leaf eating, its leaf diet mainly consists of young and easily digestible leaves.

In captivity, individuals have been observed soaking monkey biscuits in water before eating them.

=== Social systems ===
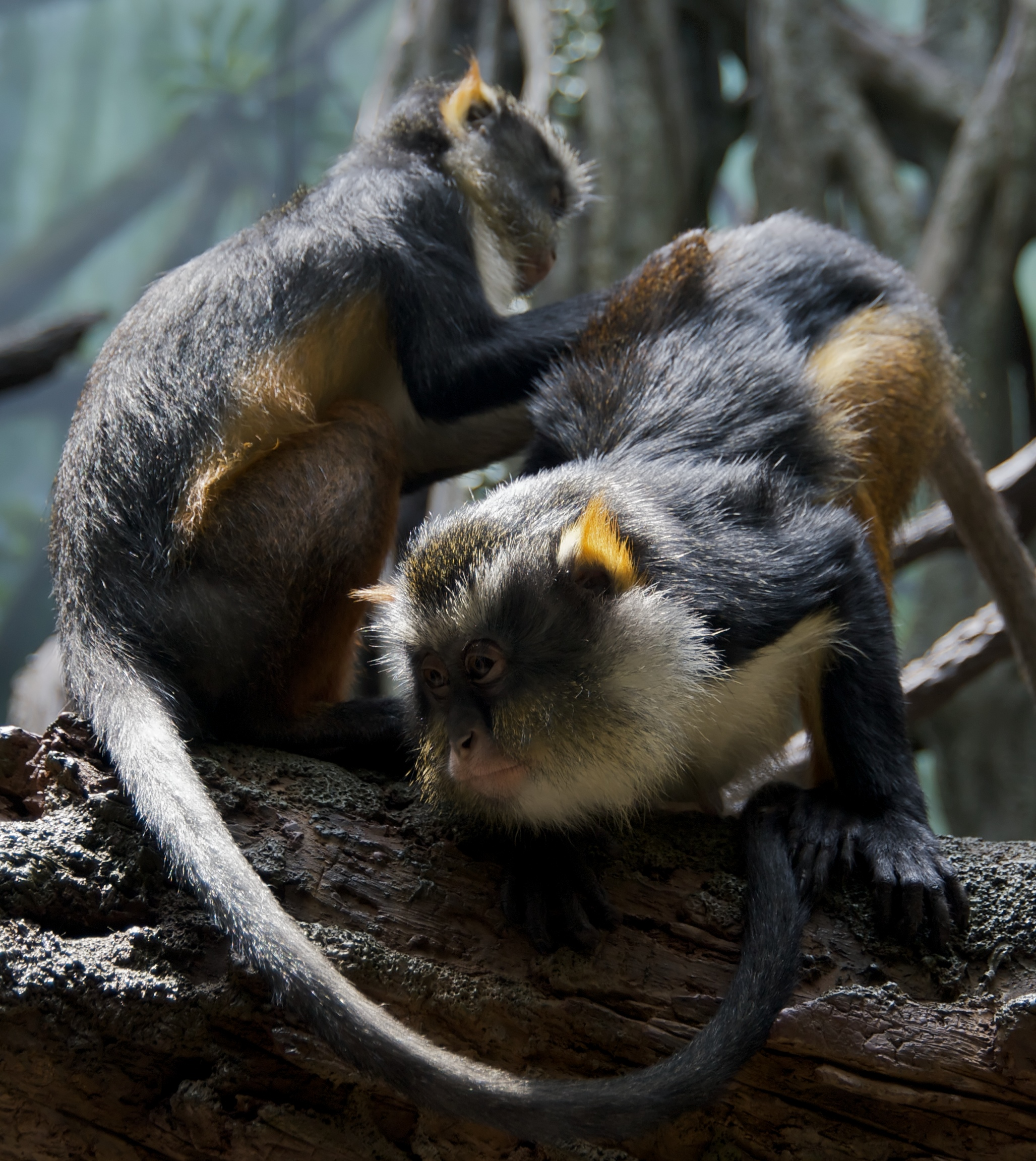
Grooming

The birth season for Wolf's mona monkey is from June through December due to rainfall and resource availability. It lives in a single male/multi-female group. It is female philopatric, with males dispersing from the group at sexual maturity. Because one male controls several females there is extreme competition for the alpha male position. Females, on the other hand, are generally amicable and participate in grooming and allomothering. Unlike macaques there are no strong linear dominance hierarchies.

Conspecific groups are generally intolerant of each other. Both males and females behave aggressively in intergroup encounters. They are very territorial, using calling and aggression (if needed). Females play an important role in territory defense; when they call it prompts the male to call as well.

Among cercopithecines, forest guenons such as Wolf's mona monkey have very developed cheek pouches. These cheek pouches are second only to macaques. The evolution of these cheek pouches in both genera may be a response to the increased potential for interspecific competition in the mixed-species associations which these monkeys frequently form.

=== Associations ===
Wolf's mona monkey is known to associate with several guenon and non-guenon species such as the black crested mangabey, the red-tailed monkey, the Angola colobus, Allen's swamp monkey, and the bonobo. No viable offspring or interspecific mating occurs during its associations with other primates.

In one study, Wolf's mona monkeys were found associating with bonobos within 20 metres for an average time of 20 minutes (although sometimes for over an hour). These interactions were mainly initiated by, and departed by, the guenons; this indicates that the guenons most benefited from these associations. Although the common chimpanzee is known to hunt sympatric primates, this is not the case with the bonobo. No aggressive interactions occurred during the study period. The red-tailed monkey (C. ascanius) was also found to associate with bonobos, and on five occasions the association was initiated by a mixed group of guenons (C. ascanius and C. wolfi). When a mixed group was involved in the association, it always lasted for over an hour. Interactions occurred once every seven hours. Associations mainly occurred while the bonobos were feeding or resting. Wolf's mona monkey was found to feed in the trees while the bonobo fed or rested. Another study has shown that bonobos will prey on monkey species, including Wolf's mona monkey. A five-year study in Salonga National Park witnessed five incidents where bonobos preyed on groups of monkeys. The research indicates it was deliberate hunting, where a group of bonobos would coordinate their actions—contrary to their normal hunting behaviour, which is quite solitary and less purposeful. In three occasions the hunt was successful and infant monkeys were captured, once a red-tailed monkey and twice a Wolf's mona monkey.

When forming associations with other primates it is necessary that there is a difference in diet or feeding height between the species to reduce competition. When in a mixed group, Wolf's mona monkey will move and forage at a mean height of 17 metres. Wolf's mona monkey is mainly found in association with the red-tailed monkey (which forages at 12 m) and the black crested mangabey (which forages at 21.5 m), two species with similar diets to Wolf's mona monkey. These mixed groups most likely form for predator detection.
