= Spot-nosed guenon =

Spot-nosed guenon may refer to either of two species in the genus Cercopithecus:

- Greater spot-nosed monkey, Cercopithecus nictitans
- Lesser spot-nosed monkey, Cercopithecus petaurista
