= Spot-nosed monkey =

Spot-nosed monkey refers to two species in the genus Cercopithecus (guenons):

- Greater spot-nosed monkey (Cercopithecus nictitans)
- Lesser spot-nosed monkey (Cercopithecus petaurista)
