= Johann Büttikofer =

Swiss zoologist (1850–1927)

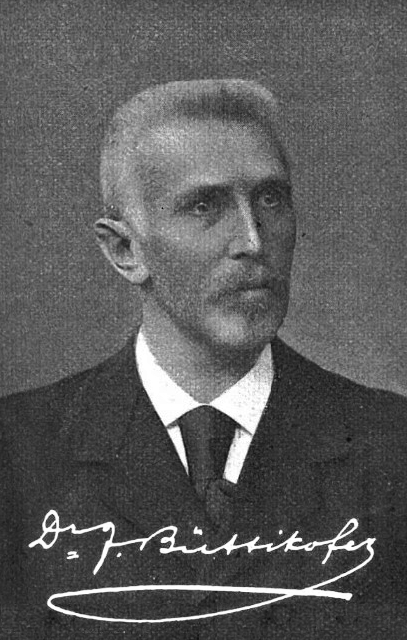
Johann Büttikofer in 1908

Johann Büttikofer (9 August 1850 – 24 June 1927) was a Swiss zoologist, who worked at the Blijdorp Zoological Garden in Rotterdam. After his retirement, he settled in Bern, Switzerland. For his extensive contributions to the knowledge of Liberian fauna based on two zoological expeditions to the Republic of Liberia (1879 to 1882 and 1886 to 1887), he is regarded as the Father of Liberian Natural History.

== Early life ==
Büttikofer was born in Ranflüh (part of Rüderswil, Canton of Bern) in the Emmental, where his father Jakob was a schoolteacher. He attended village school until the age of 16 and then studied French for one year, after which he attended a teacher-training college in Hofwil until the age of 20. He taught school in Graswil, Switzerland, for six years, hunted, began to learn taxidermy, read travel accounts, and longed to visit the tropics. He left teaching to become a preparator at the Natural History Museum of Bern, where he attended lectures by Prof. Theophil Studer, who had just returned from travelling around the world.

== Scientific career ==
In 1878, professor Ludwig Rütimeyer of Basel recommended him to become an assistant to Hermann Schlegel, the director of the Royal Museum of Natural History (Rijksmuseum van Natuurlijke Historie, now Naturalis Biodiversity Center) in Leiden, the Netherlands. He became an understudy of Schlegel's, who sought to expand the museum's role in understanding animal life in Western Africa. Büttikofer joined Schlegel on a study trip to the major museums of Germany and Austria.

Recognizing Büttikofer's capabilities and potential, Schlegel proposed sending him on a six-year expedition to Africa to collect zoological specimens from several largely unexplored forest regions, specifically Liberia, the Ivory Coast, the Gold Coast, Cameroon, and Gabon. Liberia was selected as the first destination, principally because the expedition had been offered free transportation on the ships of the Rotterdam trading firm Hendrik Muller & Co., which had several trading factories along the Liberian coast. Two zoological expeditions to Liberia were carried out from November 1879 - April 1882 and November 1886 - June 1887; the great success of the Liberia expeditions, the death of Dr. Schlegel, and Buttikofer's own health considerations caused the other initially planned destinations to be dropped.

In 1890, he published a two-volume work, Reisebilder aus Liberia in German. This constituted the first monograph on the Republic of Liberia and contains some of the earliest photographs of nature in Liberia. An annotated English translation of this publication was produced in November, 2012, by Brill (Leiden), titled Travel Sketches from Liberia: Johann Büttikofer's 19th Century Rainforest Explorations in West Africa, co-edited by Henk Dop and Phillip T. Robinson.

=== First expedition ===
On the first expedition, Büttikofer was accompanied by a Dutchman, Carolus Franciscus Sala of Leiden, who had previously served in the Royal Netherlands East Indies Army and had also collected zoological specimens in present-day Angola. Venturing into areas in the lands of the Gola people along the Saint Paul River that had never before been visited by Europeans, Büttikofer and Sala were highly successful in their collecting activities. Among their finds was the first complete specimen of the zebra duiker (Cephalophus zebra). Suffering from a range of adversities, rapacious local chieftains, malaria, and other tropical medical afflictions, Büttikofer and Sala next set up a collecting station at Robertsport. Here, Sala's condition worsened, and he died on 10 June 1881 and was buried in a mission cemetery. Büttikofer continued collecting, now in the company of the Liberian hunter Jackson Demery; he also visited the various coastal trading posts in eastern Liberia, until severe ill health forced him to return to Europe.

During a lengthy period of convalescence, Büttikofer wrote an extensive account of his findings, in Dutch, which was published in 1883 in the journal of the Netherlands Royal Geographical Society, whose translated title is: "A Report on Liberia: Results of a Journey of Exploration Undertaken by J. Büttikofer and C. F. Sala in the Years 1879-1882". When Prof. Schlegel died in 1884, Büttikofer was appointed curator of birds.

=== Second expedition ===
Whereas Büttikofer's first expedition was funded by Schlegel, his second was largely financed by himself, on an unpaid leave of absence, with costs to be recuperated by selling specimens to the Leiden museum and others. As a co-worker, he recruited a Swiss boyhood acquaintance and fellow avid hunter, Franz Xaver Stampfli (1847–1903) of Solothurn, Switzerland, who had come to visit him while intending to emigrate to the United States. Stampfli travelled to Liberia in 1884 while Büttikofer continued his recovery. During his stay in the general area of the Junk River, Stampfli discovered an antelope species entirely new to science, Jentink's duiker (Cephalophus jentinki), but had to return for convalescence in the spring of 1886.

In November 1886, Büttikofer and Stampfli jointly set out for Liberia. While Büttikofer conducted a journey to Robertsport to collect Jackson Demery to join the expedition, Stampfli set up a collecting station at Schieffelin. After extensive forays in the surrounding area, a second station was set up in Hill Town, which proved to be most successful. Here, the first complete specimens of the pygmy hippopotamus (Choeropsis liberiensis) were collected. In May 1887, at the expiry of his leave of absence and again suffering from ill health, Büttikofer returned to Europe, while Stampfli continued collecting for another year.

Encouraged by the earlier success of the "Results of a Journey of Exploration", Büttikofer combined the results of the two expeditions into the two-volume German Reisebilder aus Liberia published by E. J. Brill (Leiden) in 1890. To this day, this work stands out as the first comprehensive monograph ever written about the Republic of Liberia, including natural history, geology, agricultural production, ethnography, customs and dress, history, finance, commerce and trade, etc., while also providing highly vivid travel accounts.

Apart from the already mentioned finds, the collected material resulted in the identification of more entirely new species and subspecies of a variety of taxa, for example, Stampfli's spot-nosed monkey (Cercopithecus nictitans stampflii), the lesser spot-nosed monkey (Cercopithecus nictitans buettikoferi), Büttikofer's shrew (Crocidura buettikoferi), Büttikofer's epauletted fruit bat (Epomops buettikoferi), and Büttikofer's bichir (Polypterus palmas buettikoferi). Büttikofer's animal specimens are in a number of European museum collections, but principally at the natural history museum in Leiden (Naturalis). Ethnographic artifacts from his work in Liberia, as well as collection of photographs taken during the second expedition, are at the Rijksmuseum Volkenkunde in Leiden (Museum Volkenkunde), the World Museum (Wereldmuseum) in Rotterdam, and at the Historical Museum of Bern in Switzerland.

Reisebilder aus Liberia, as well as the ongoing series of publications based upon his collected specimens, soon established Büttikofer as the unrivalled authority on Liberian fauna. Having maintained close contact with scientific circles in Switzerland, the University of Bern bestowed an honorary doctorate degree (dr. phil. h. c.) upon him in 1895. Around that same year, the Liberian government awarded him the Liberian Humane Order of African Redemption, which recognizes individuals for assisting the Liberian nation and for playing prominent roles in the "uplifting of its people". Thereafter, when the subject of Liberia came before many scientific groups, the general reaction was reported to be, in essence, "No need to go to Liberia, for Dr. Büttikofer has thoroughly covered that subject." Büttikofer's very success may have impeded further zoological work in Liberia for several decades.

=== Third expedition ===
In 1893–1894, Büttikofer was the official zoologist of the Nieuwenhuis Expedition to central Borneo, organized by Anton Willem Nieuwenhuis, a well-known Dutch explorer. This work resulted in valuable contributions to the knowledge of the wildlife of that region, during which he travelled up the Mandai and Sibau Rivers and also ascended Mt. Kenepai and Mt. Liang Koebeng. Several birds, reptiles, and invertebrates from there still bear his name today, including, for example, Büttikofer's babbler (Pellorneum buettikoferi), Büttikofer's glass lizard (Dopasia buettikoferi), and a skink (Sphenomorphus buettikoferi). At a later date, Büttikofer remarked that working in the East Indies was more like a "holiday journey" in contrast to the difficulties that he had faced in Liberia.

Between 1897 and 1924, Büttikofer was the director of the Zoological Garden in Rotterdam. During his long directorship, he was associated with some of the main forerunners of nature conservation in the Netherlands. He is best known for his two zoological expeditions to the Republic of Liberia (1879 to 1882 and 1886 to 1887) and resulting publications; from 1897 to 1924, he was the director of the Blijdorp Zoological Garden in Rotterdam. After his retirement, he settled in Bern, Switzerland. For his extensive contributions to the knowledge of Liberian fauna, he is regarded as the Father of Liberian Natural History.

== Nature conservation ==
Büttikofer was chairman of the Dutch Society for the Protection of Birds (1909–1924). A six-hectare ornithological reserve established in his honour in 1926 on the island of Texel in the North Holland province of the Netherlands still bears the name Büttikofer's Mieland. This reserve is now part of a complex of larger and smaller terrains referred to as the "Low Lands of Texel" and are managed by the Netherlands Society for the Preservation of Natural Monuments Vereniging Natuurmonumenten.

In 1924, Büttikofer retired and relocated to Bern, Switzerland, residing only a short distance from the natural history museum where he began his highly productive career. He remained active in scientific meetings until he died of pneumonia on June 24, 1927, following a trip to the Dutch East Indies. He was survived by his wife Petronella. Dr. Büttikofer was held in high regard by his European and African colleagues. Some 25 years after his death, G. A. Brouwer noted, in his book on Dutch ornithologists, "he was not merely a friend of animals, but he also had a great sympathy for his fellow man, a characteristic that had already been very useful in Liberia, and was pleasant, convivial and a man of authority, who played a leading role in several societies."
