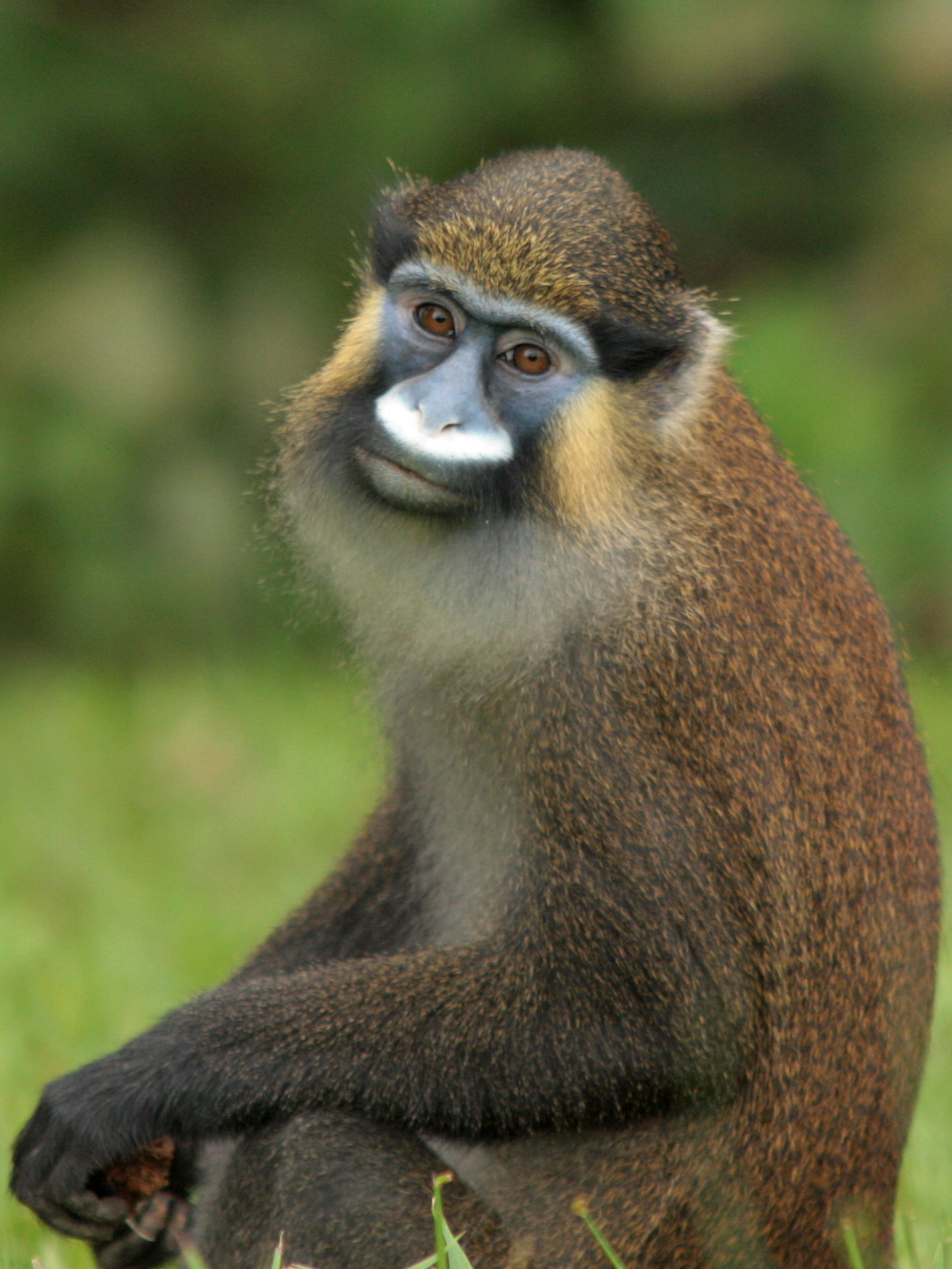

Conservation status
- Least Concern (IUCN 3.1)

Scientific classification
- Kingdom: Animalia
- Phylum: Chordata
- Class: Mammalia
- Infraclass: Placentalia
- Order: Primates
- Family: Cercopithecidae
- Genus: Cercopithecus
- Species: C. cephus

Binomial name
- Cercopithecus cephus (Linnaeus, 1758)
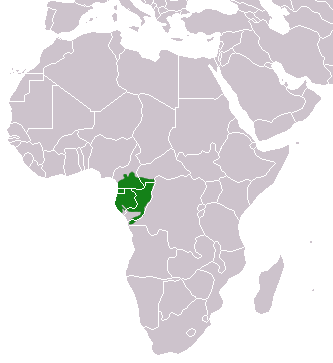
- Moustached guenon range

Synonyms
- Simia cephus Linnaeus, 1758

= Moustached guenon =

Species of Old World monkey

3d model of the skeleton

The moustached guenon or moustached monkey (Cercopithecus cephus) is a species of primate in the family Cercopithecidae. It is found in Angola, Cameroon, Central African Republic, Republic of the Congo, Democratic Republic of the Congo, Equatorial Guinea, and Gabon.

This monkey is an arboreal, omnivorous, and medium-sized mammal. According to the IUCN, the population of the moustached monkeys is considered to be large. They are widely used in biological labs.

== Taxonomy ==
The moustached guenon belongs to the genus Cercopithecus, a genus of Old World monkeys, and in the C. cephus group. It is named by its unique moustached face in the monkeys, which has three recognized subspecies: (1) Red-tailed moustached monkey (C. cephus cephus); (2) Gray-tailed Moustached Monkey (C. cephus cephodes); (3) White-nosed Moustached Monkey (C. cephus ngottoensis). However, the C. cephus group also includes many other long-tailed monkey that has other unique morphological patterns except the moustache, for example, the regular red-tailed monkeys (Cercopithecus scanius), the red-bellied monkey (C. e. erythrogaster) and the white-throated monkey (Cercopithecus erythrogaster). The diversity of the moustached guenon is one of the highest among Cercopithecus species. In addition, it is not the only primate genus with the "moustached" patterns (see also moustached tamarins).

== Habitat and distribution ==
Cercopithecus cephus usually live in undistributed forests, and they are not easy to be recorded by ground-level cameras because they are arboreal. The C. cephus are diurnal and share vertical spaces with other species. They are born to jump between the tropical trees (up to 20m from a tree to another), and they are widespread in Gabon and Northern Congo. The main region starts from the Sanaga River's South and East side and goes all the way to the Ubangi watersheds, which are mostly covered by the lowland tropical rainforests; however, the gallery forests, flooded forests and mangrove forests are also available for them.

== Biographical patterns ==
=== Size and weight ===
For adults, the average weight of this species is around 4.1 kg for males and 3.6 kg for females. The average length (head-to-body) is 58 cm for males and 49 cm for females; and the average tail length is 78 cm for males and 69.5 cm for females.

=== Lifespan ===
The average life span is around 22 years for the wild guenon and up to 36 in captivity.

=== Face patterns ===
The Cercopithecus genus evolved with special visual patterns for higher efficiency in association; therefore, they can have a higher chance of survival. The C. cephus has powerful and enlarged cheekbones, the most common moustache is the crescent white strip of fur under the nose, and the surrounding fur is black, which shows a strong color contrast; hence, the face patterns can be considered as visual signals. On the top of the white stripe, the main area of the face is greyish blue, and the eyes are copper. The face pattern does not necessarily help to distinguish the male and female guenon. Like other Old World monkeys, the guenon also developed the hairless rump pad for comfortable sitting.

== Behaviour ==
=== Polyspecific associations ===
The C. cephus cooperates with the C. nictitans and the C. pogonias ships; for example, the cephus monkeys alert the other two groups when they observe the eagles because they live lower than the other two groups, which will give loud vocal alerts to the cephus monkeys when they feel an aerial danger. Studies have shown that these types of associations did not randomly occur in the evolution process. Moreover, the eagle predation mainly shaped these surviving tactics and foraging strategies. The diet of C.cephus includes fruit, insects and leaves, respectively; fruit is the dominant food resource for this species. The polyspecific associations are the main reason that these three species can share the same living area. Up to six guenon species can share the same living area, but four guenon species generally share a common area.

Colour patterns in the Cercopithecus provide unique visual identities for each genus which allowed the development of the polyspecific association of the guenon communities. For the red-tailed and the nose-spotted moustached monkeys, the most observable differences are on their faces; however, genital colour contrasts and head movements are some of the less observable differences.

=== Foraging and antipredator strategies ===
Guenon's foraging efficiency has been shaped significantly by the polyspecific pattern; meanwhile, the quantification of their availability to food remains unsolved due to the complexity of tropical rainforests and the high diversity of food.

The antipredator tactics among the three species are also called troop activity, which starts at daybreak and finishes at sunset. The higher interspecific competition was discovered during the troop activity than during the foraging period (fruit feeding time). Nocturnal predators usually come from the ground, making the three species prefer to leave the dense forest at night and sleep in a large tree's crown.

Each troop/group of guenon consists of one alpha male and 10 to 40 females (like a harem); the average size of a troop is 22 members. An outsider male may occasionally come to mate with one of the females; however, there will be a chance to fail and the female will escort him out of the territory.

The C. cephus has surprisingly large cheek pouches which can carry the same amount of food as its stomach, which allows it to store lots of fruits for later eating in a less dangerous area. The regular foraging time fulfills the day time, and the guenon have the habit to sleep with full stomach.

Vocal communications, visual identifications, and tactile activities are involved in the troop's daily social activities, and the guenons usually can give loud and continuous sounds and fast movements combined with the readily visual signals.

=== Guenon hybridizations and adaptive radiation ===
The moustached monkey's vocal performance is similar to that of C. ascanius and C. erythrotis, and hybridization exists among the three species. Therefore, Thomas Struhsaker suggests categorizing these three species as one species. However, hybridization also increases the risk of guenon's adaptive advantages, that they might lose their visual patterns during the hybridization. The hybridization rate remains low between the moustached monkeys and other guenon subspecies due to the guenon's unique face pattern.

=== Reproductivity ===
The guenons usually mate between 4 and 5 years old, with a female showing her rump to the male. The regular time for new births comes at the end of the rainy period of the year due to the subsequent rich food season. If the rainy season is year-round in the equatorial area, the mating and birth seasons can also appear at any time in the year.

== Laboratory experiments ==
=== Susceptibility to poliomyelitis virus ===
C. cephus can be fatally overwhelmed by the poliomyelitis virus (e.g., Hartford and SK strains) and can easily generate cross-contamination with other species, such as the Rhesus macaque (Macaca mulatta). The susceptibility of C. cephus to getting infected by poliomyelitis is similar to that of the green monkey (Cercopithecus sabaeus) and the Rhesus macaque.

=== Phylogenetic tests ===
The study of the X-DNA, Y-DNA, and mtDNA genetic systems of the Cercopithecus monkey hybrid has shown the polyphyletic C. cephus lineages; and the split of the West African species from the Central African ecosystem. Within the genus, C. diana, C. neglectus, C. mona, C. hamlyni, C. nictitans, and C. cephus consist of six special chromosome fissions, which may lead them to a monophyletic clade. The biogeographic break in the watershed in Nigeria and Cameroon may involve a three-clade substructure, which is a break that occurred after the Pleistocene glaciation. However, what triggers the polyphyly remains unknown; it could be inherited from ancestral hybridization or due to incomplete lineage sorting.

=== Malaria vectoring ===
On the east side of Gabon, researchers have captured mammals like bats, C. cephus, and Mandrillus sphinx to study the infection rate of the malaria parasites in the genus Hepatocystis. The research involves introducing infected bats to a population of uninfected C. cephus monkeys. The infected bats would eat the monkey's left-over banana skins, which also allowed the two species to be vectored by the mosquitos in the same area. The blood from four C. cephus monkeys were then examined, showing that three of them were infected by the Hepatocystis parasites, indicating possible cross-contamination between C. cephus and the bats.

=== Serological survey and ebola virus ===
Serological screening or surveys are widely used in determining the prevalence of a disease among a certain populations. The survey can collect samples from animal's blood or feces. The ebola virus outbreaks were identified as the consequences of independent zoonotic transmission, which makes the outbreaks less predictable. The serological survey deployed a specific Luminex-based assay to detect the Immunoglobulin G antibody in different non-human primates (NHPs); and the result has shown only one C. cephus has produced antibodies to the Sudan ebolavirus (SUDV), which means the C. cephus group and all the tested Cercopithecus groups can be considered as intermediate hosts for Ebola virus. Consequently, the cross-species transmission can be rocketed in the bushmeat and pet trading markets.

=== SIVmus ===
SIVmus is the simian immunodeficiency virus (the monkey version HIV), and it can affect C. cephus easily. The full-length sequence phylogenetic analysis and the partial pol sequence study have allowed researchers to categorize five new SIVmus strains that can infect C. cephus. Avelin Aghokeng and his colleagues identified the two distinct SIVmus lineages (SIVmus-1 & SIVmus-2) infecting C. cephus isolated in the animals living in the same area. The researchers have studied Peeters et al.'s (2002) data, which collected blood samples from 788 monkeys in Cameroon; 302 monkeys were from the guenons. The 788 monkeys were caught for pet and bushmeat trading; 55 adults and 160 infants were sold as pets and 480 adults and 93 infants were sold as bushmeat. Further study of the lineages have shown the existence of CST and recombination including both the categorized and undiscovered SIVmus. As a result, the lentivirus in sympatric NHP species evolved and survived through CST and recombination. The study of SIVmus has shown the virus's strength of survivorship and the risk of infecting human through the bushmeat trading market.

== Conservation ==
=== Impacts from human activities ===
==== Poaching, bushmeat market, and pet trading in Western Africa ====
The moustached monkeys are the main target in the primate poaching activities and the main victim in the western Africa bushmeat market.

Many C. cephus infants have been captured and sold to people as pets.

==== Road constructions ====
Road construction has fragmented the undisturbed areas in Western Africa, which threatens the Cercopithecus living conditions in general because many of them are sympatric.

On the other hand, the Road-effect zones (REZs) were rarely calculated for the areas where the primates are usually present in Western Africa. Moreover, studies have shown that the distribution of roads can significantly affect primate living areas and population size; for example, the newly built road may facilitate poaching activities in terms of transportation and access to more undisturbed areas.

Environmental Impact Assessment (EIA) evaluates the potential impacts from the proposed projects, within which the impact assessors will read and evaluate the quality of the project proposals and send the assessment report to the decision-makers; however, the science was poorly used in EIA. Road construction is one type of projects that needs to go through the EIA procedures. Unfortunately the rocketed infrastructure implementation in Western Africa come with a large scale of deregulations, which indicate low EIA credibility in the related road constructions, which means the REZs may not be considered at all in most areas. The lack of concern of the road effects to primates have not only push the endangered primates into a more challenging situation, but also make the less concerned primate like the C. cephus more vulnerable as well. The C. cephus population resilience to habitat fragmentation due to road construction remains unstudied, and the poaching of the C. cephus has not shown a turning point yet. As a result, large population decrease may appear among the geunon's groups. On the other hand, the bushmeat market is highly risky in spreading the discussed zoonoses; and may be even riskier due to the rapid road construction in West Africa.
