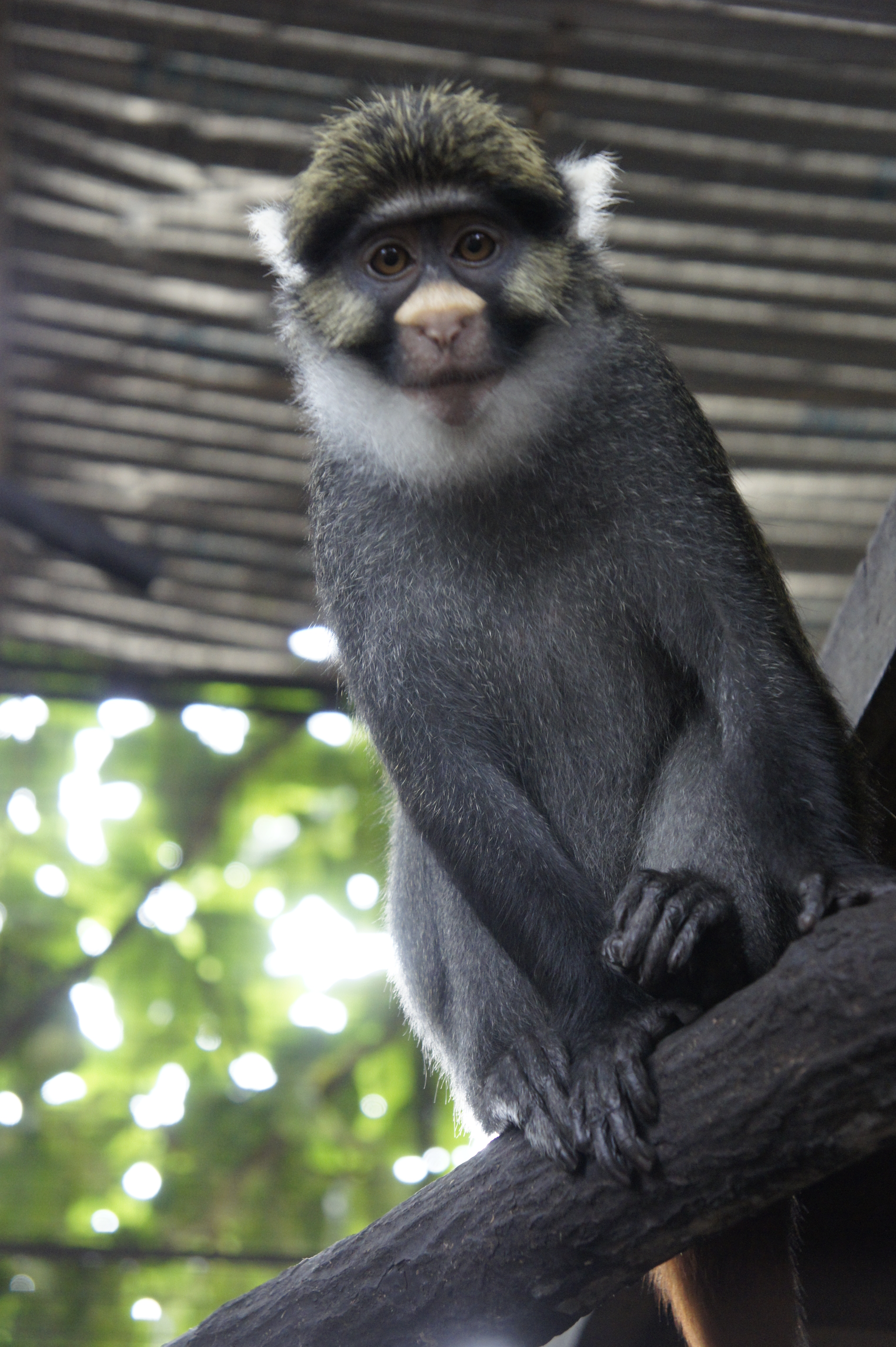

Conservation status
- Endangered (IUCN 3.1)

Scientific classification
- Kingdom: Animalia
- Phylum: Chordata
- Class: Mammalia
- Order: Primates
- Family: Cercopithecidae
- Genus: Cercopithecus
- Species: C. sclateri

Binomial name
- Cercopithecus sclateri Pocock, 1904
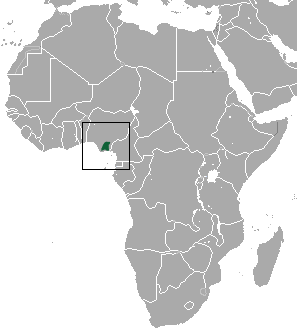
- Sclater's Guenon range

= Sclater's guenon =

Species of Old World monkey

Sclater's guenon (Cercopithecus sclateri), also known as Sclater's monkey and the Nigerian monkey, is an Old World monkey that was first described by Reginald Innes Pocock in 1904 and named after Philip Sclater. It is an arboreal and diurnal primate that lives in the forests of southern Nigeria. It should not be confused with the closely related species, the white-throated guenon (Cercopithecus erythrogaster), which occurs in Nigeria and Benin. Sclater's guenon was formerly classified as a subspecies of the red-eared guenon (C. erythrotis).

The diet of Sclater's guenon is unknown. The species is likely primarily a frugivore that supplements its diet with other plant parts and insects, based on data from closely related species.

Sclater's guenon was thought to be nearly extinct until the late 1980s. The species is now known to occur in several isolated populations between the Niger and Cross Rivers in southern Nigeria. This region falls in the Guinean Forests of the West Africa biodiversity hotspot.

The species does not occur in any officially protected areas, but three populations of Sclater's guenon are known to be protected by local people who consider the monkeys to have sacred status. Mostly because of hunting and habitat fragmentation and loss, thus increasing population isolation and decline, Sclater's guenon is listed as a vulnerable species.

Sclater's guenon is known to occur in captivity only at the Centre for Education, Rehabilitation, and Conservation of Primates and Nature in Cross River State, Nigeria.
