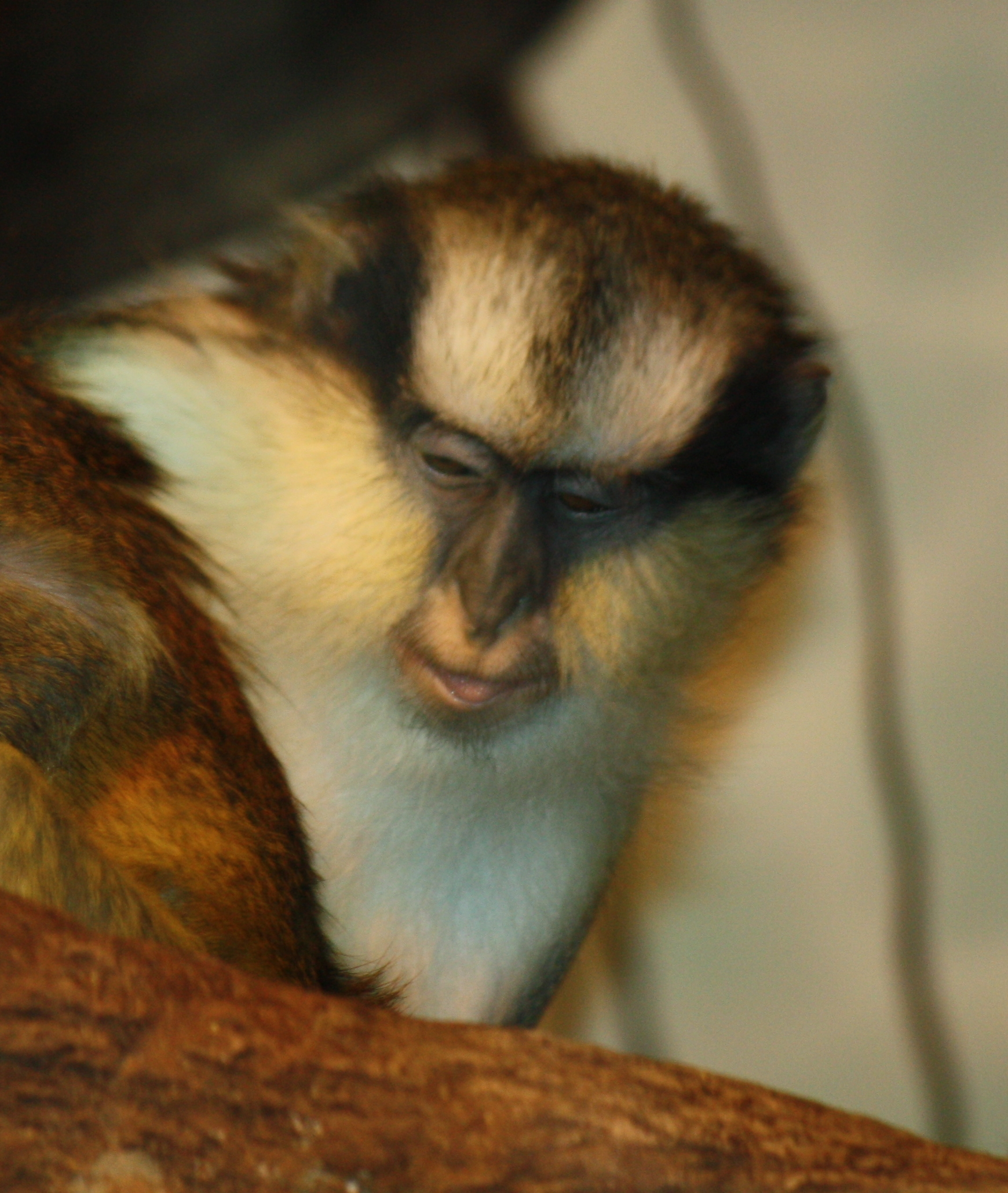

Conservation status
- Near Threatened (IUCN 3.1)

Scientific classification
- Kingdom: Animalia
- Phylum: Chordata
- Class: Mammalia
- Infraclass: Placentalia
- Order: Primates
- Family: Cercopithecidae
- Genus: Cercopithecus
- Species: C. pogonias

Binomial name
- Cercopithecus pogonias Bennett, 1833
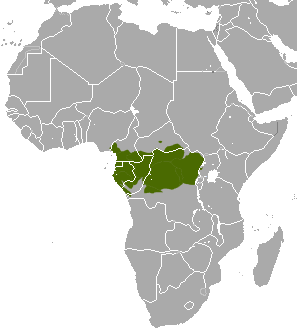
- Crested mona monkey range

= Crested mona monkey =

Species of Old World monkey

The crested mona monkey, also known as the crowned guenon, crowned monkey, golden-bellied guenon, or golden-bellied monkey, (Cercopithecus pogonias), is a species of African primate in the family Cercopithecidae found in west central Africa.

== Description ==
The crested mona monkey is a medium-sized, long tailed arboreal monkey. The females are smaller than the males but show similar colouration and pattern of coat. They have a brown coat speckled with grey which becomes black on its lower arms and legs and on the base of its long tail. The rump, belly and the insides of the legs are golden-yellow contrasting with the rest of the fur. The males have a distinctive blue scrotum. Their faces are mainly dark blue with a pink muzzle. Around the face the fur is yellow marked with a wide black stripes which runs from the beside the eyes over to the temples and across the centre of the forehead where it forms the characteristic small crest which gives this species its common name.

== Distribution ==
Western central Africa from the Cross River in Nigeria and southern Cameroon south to Cabinda, Angola, including Bioko Island, and east into the Central African Republic, eastern Congo and the northern Democratic Republic of Congo.

== Habitat ==
The Crested mona monkey occurs in mature lowland rainforest, in both primary and secondary forest, where there is a well developed canopy and with a clear understorey. Will also occur in flooded forest but avoids small forest patches, gallery forests and open secondary forest with a dense understorey.

== Habits ==
The crested mona monkey is a highly vocal species with a wide repertoire of calls. Both males and females have vocal sacs which are inflated to be used as resonators. A typical call is the booming call made by the adult male which can be heard more than 200m away. Social interactions include tail twining between resting monkeys and a ritualised head display.

The crested mona monkey is an agile species, which crosses large gaps between trees by jumping. They are normally found in groups of between 8 and 20 individuals which are typically made up of a single male, several females and their dependent offspring. Groups are highly vocal, with the males producing the loud, "boom" mentioned above announcing their presence and status, there is also a sharp hacking call which is used as an alarm. The dominant males are able to establish groups, and therefore the lives of most males are rather solitary and are marked by an absence of social contact. Surprisingly, this appears to lead to some males joining groups of other monkeys such as the black colobus Colobus satanas, where these solitary males can form strong group bonds with the non conspecific monkeys, possibly resulting in a permanent loss of mating opportunities. The social groups of crested mona monkeys will also associate with other guenon species, especially with moustached guenon Cercopithecus cephus and greater spot-nosed monkey Cercopithecus nictitans. In the Atlantic coastal forests, this includes red-capped mangabey as well. These large mixed-species groups grant the monkeys' increased protection from predation, as the greater number of eyes on the sky means that the spotting of predators such as birds of prey is more likely, and it also facilitates the sharing of information between groups about the best foraging sites.

The crested mona monkey is mainly frugivorous but invertebrates are also frequently taken, along with small quantities of leaves. Unlike most guenons, populations of the crested mona monkey in the northern parts of its range are known to migrate over long distances to forage for seasonally abundant food supplies. The crested mona monkey has a polygynous mating system where the dominant male in each group has exclusive breeding access to all the females in that group. Breeding seem to take place at any time of year, and the females give birth to a single baby after a gestation period of roughly five months.

== Taxonomy ==
This species sits within the mona superspecies grouping within Cercopithecus. There does not seem to be a consensus around how many subspecies of the crested mona monkey are recognised and some which were formerly considered subspecies of this species are now regarded as species in their own right, e.g. Wolf's mona monkey Cercopithecus wolfi and Dent's mona monkey Cercopithecus denti. Three subspecies appear to be the most widely accepted treatment.

The subspecies and their ranges are:

- Cercopithecus pogonias grayi Fraser, 1850 (Gray's crested mona): Sangha River basin of southern Cameroon, southern Central African Republic through to the northern Democratic republic and Cabinda.
- Cercopithecus pogonias nigripes du Chaillu, 1860 (Black-footed crested mona): Endemic to Gabon and southwestern Republic of Congo.
- Cercopithecus pogonias pogonias Bennett, 1833 (Golden-bellied crested mona): Bioko and the adjacent parts of southern Nigeria, southern Cameroon.

The subspecies schwarzianus is not now generally recognised.
