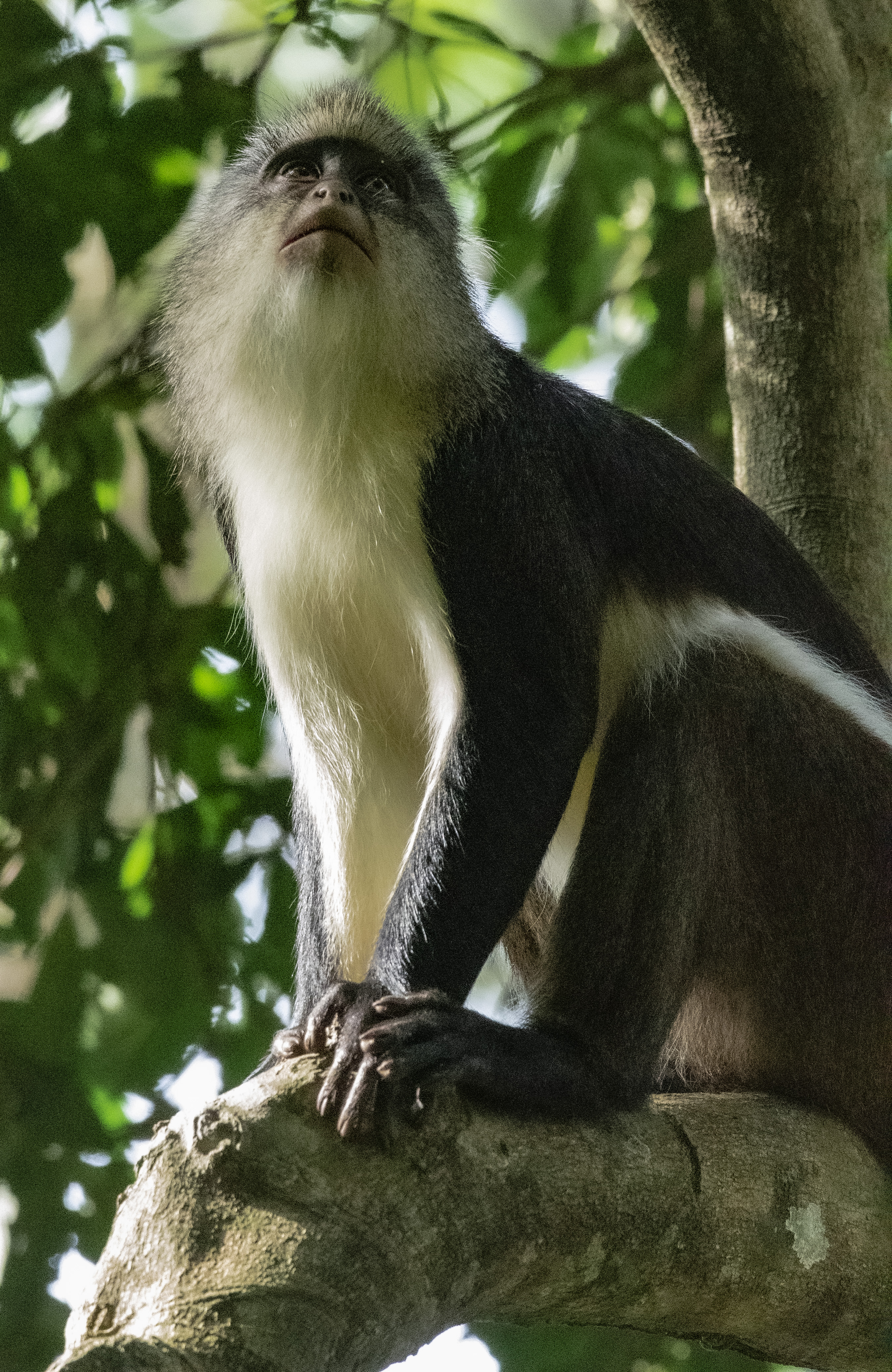
- In Nyungwe National Park, Rwanda

Conservation status
- Least Concern (IUCN 3.1)

Scientific classification
- Kingdom: Animalia
- Phylum: Chordata
- Class: Mammalia
- Infraclass: Placentalia
- Order: Primates
- Family: Cercopithecidae
- Genus: Cercopithecus
- Species: C. denti

Binomial name
- Cercopithecus denti Thomas, 1907

Synonyms
- liebrechtsi Dubois and Matschie, 1912

= Dent's mona monkey =

Species of Old World monkey

Dent's mona monkey (Cercopithecus denti) is an Old World monkey in the family Cercopithecidae found in Central Africa. Debate on whether it constituted a separate species or subspecies continued between zoologists, and it was previously classified as a subspecies of other monkeys by some of them. It was re-classified as a separate species in 2001. It is classified as Least Concern in the IUCN Red List.

== Taxonomy ==
Dent's mona monkey is an Old World monkey in the family Cercopithecidae. The species was described by English zoologist Oldfield Thomas in 1907. Debate on whether it constituted a separate species or subspecies continued between zoologists. While many zoologists classified it as a separate species, it was classified as a subspecies of other monkeys by mona monkey, Wolf's mona monkey, and crested mona monkey by some of them across the years. Further research was required to examine the various species of mona monkeys in the forests between the Lualaba and Lomani rivers. It was re-classified as a separate species in 2001.

== Morphology ==
It is a small monkey with long, flexible limbs, and a long tail. The males are larger with the females about two-third the size of the males. Males weigh about 3.8 to 4.2 kg (8.4 to 9.3 lb) and have a head to tail length of 44.5 to 51.1 cm (17.5 to 20.1 in) with a 49 cm (19 in) tail. The tail is mainly used for maintaining balance. Both the sexes exhibit similar colorization. The body fur varies in colour from brown to red. The underside and inner part of the limbs are white in color. It has blue eyes with a tuft of hair extending from the brows towards the protruding ears. It has white facial hair above its lips. Like other species of mona monkeys, it has cheek pouches that are used to store food. It also possess thick skin on their hind quarters that supports prolonged sitting. The males have blue colored scrotums and larger canine teeth, as a part of sexual dimorphism.

== Distribution and habitat ==
Dent's mona monkey is found in the Central African countries of Democratic Republic of the Congo, the Congo, Rwanda, western Uganda, and the Central African Republic. There have been reports of sightings in Burundi's Ruzizi plains. It prefers tropical forests of up to 2,400 m (7,900 ft) elevation in the eastern part of its range. It occurs in lowland river plains, and montane forests across the range. It is classified as Least Concern in the IUCN Red List.

== Behaviour ==
Dent's mona monkey is believed to have a life expectancy of about 20 years. It is diurnal and is most active in the early morning and in the evening. It is arboreal, spending most of the time on trees. It is omnivorous, and the diet ranges from fruits, flowers, and leaves to small insects. It generally moves on all four limbs. It makes loud and varied vocalizations. It is a social animal and is usually found in groups consisting of a single male and multiple females.
