= Sphenomorphus buettikoferi =

Conservation status
- Data Deficient (IUCN 3.1)

Scientific classification
- Kingdom: Animalia
- Phylum: Chordata
- Class: Reptilia
- Order: Squamata
- Family: Scincidae
- Genus: Sphenomorphus
- Species: S. buettikoferi

Binomial name
- Sphenomorphus buettikoferi (Lidth de Jeude, 1905)

Synonyms
- Lygosoma Büttikoferi Lidth de Jeude, 1905; Sphenomorphus buttikoferi — Mittleman, 1952; Sphenomorphus buettikoferi — Das, 2004

Species of lizard

Sphenomorphus buettikoferi is a species of skink, a lizard in the family Scincidae. The species is endemic to the island of Borneo.

== Etymology ==
The specific name, buettikoferi, is in honor of Swiss zoologist Johann Büttikofer.

== Geographic range ==
On the island of Borneo, S. buettikoferi is found in Kalimantan and Sarawak.

== Habitat ==
The preferred natural habitat of S. buettikoferi is forest.

== Reproduction ==
The mode of reproduction of S. buettikoferi is unknown.
