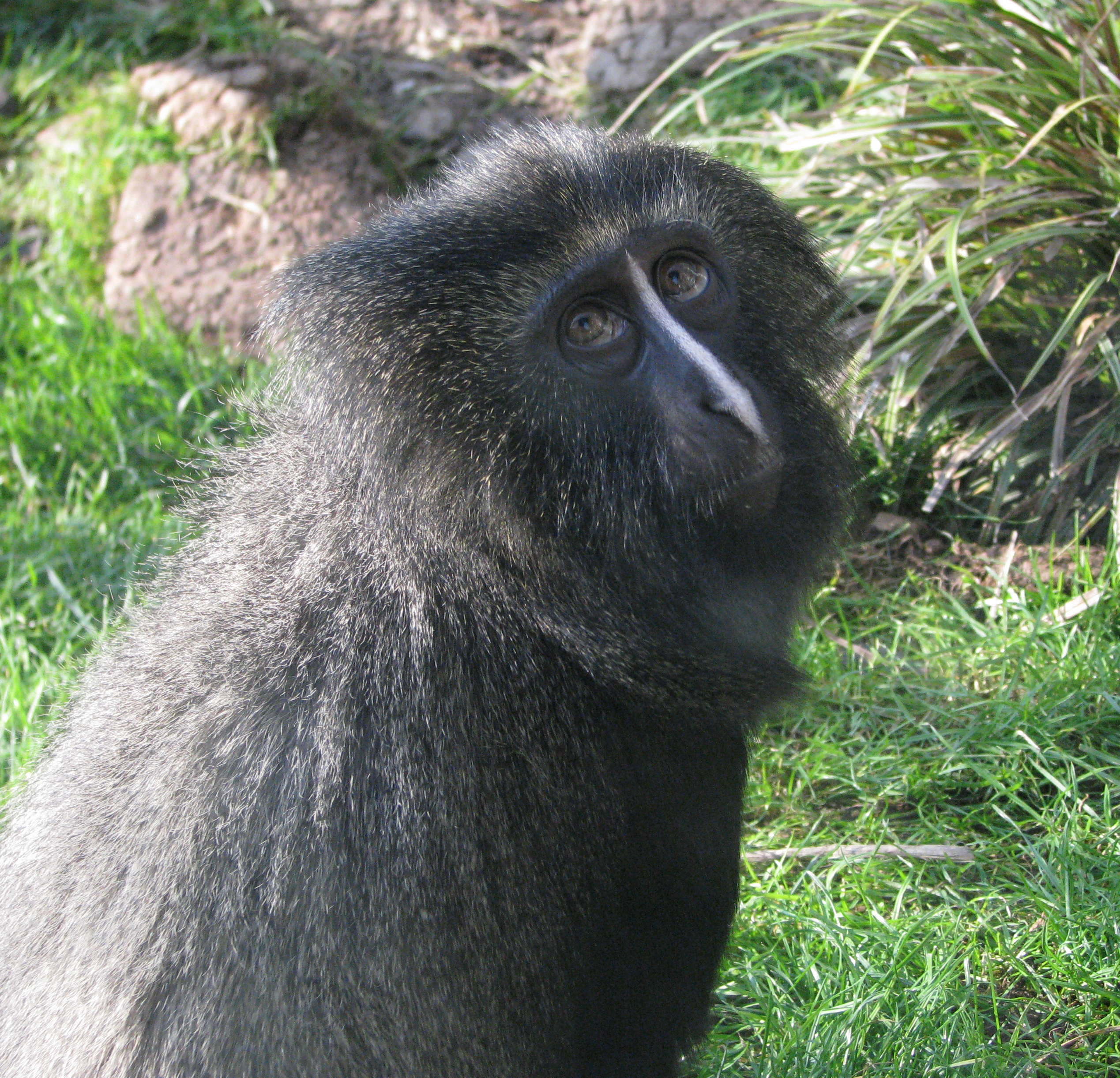

Conservation status
- Vulnerable (IUCN 3.1)

Scientific classification
- Kingdom: Animalia
- Phylum: Chordata
- Class: Mammalia
- Order: Primates
- Family: Cercopithecidae
- Genus: Cercopithecus
- Species: C. hamlyni

Binomial name
- Cercopithecus hamlyni Pocock, 1907
- Geographic range

Audio

= Hamlyn's monkey =

Species of Old World monkey

The Hamlyn's monkey (Cercopithecus hamlyni), also known as the owl-faced monkey, is a species of Old World monkey that inhabits the bamboo and primary rainforests of the Congo. This species is exceedingly rare and known only from a few specimens; little is known about it. However these specimens tend to be widely dispersed throughout the eastern part of Congo, from the Epulu River to the Lukuga River and from the Congo River to the Kabale Forest, with one example in northwestern Rwanda. Geographically it corresponds quite closely to another species of monkey, L'Hoest's monkey C. lhoesti. It travels on the ground, and researchers think that it may be awake primarily by night.

Schwarz (1928) grouped this species with C. l'hoesti, while Elliot (1913) noted its distinctive cusp pattern on the third molar, and reassigned it to a separate genus, Rhinostigma. This he believed to be an intermediate between Cercopithecus and Cercocebus. Hamlyn's monkey has one subspecies other than the nominate. In weight, the male is much larger than the female, with the average adult weighing 7 to 10 kg, while females weigh on average 4.5 to 6 kg. It is thought to be a frugivore-folivore in diet. Some published reports indicated that Hamlyn's monkey lives in small groups, of ten members or less, with one male and multiple females, with no data to show them occurring in monogamous groups. The species has been found only in higher elevations, above 900m and up to 4600m. In color it is generally dark gray, with a characteristic white stripe which extends from the root of the nose to the upper lip, giving it an owl-like appearance, hence the name "owl-faced monkey". The name "Hamlyn's monkey" and the scientific epithet "hamlyni" come from the animal dealer who first brought this species to the London Zoo. It has scent glands on its chest with which it marks its territory. Both sexes have bare, blue buttocks, and the mature male has bright red and blue genitals. The juvenile coloration is a yellow-brown coat and a pink face. In captivity it has been known to live for about 33 years. Like others of this genus, it covers a wide area in its daily travels, mostly in a search for food.

== Subspecies ==
- Cercopithecus hamlyni hamlyni
- Cercopithecus hamlyni kahuziensis
