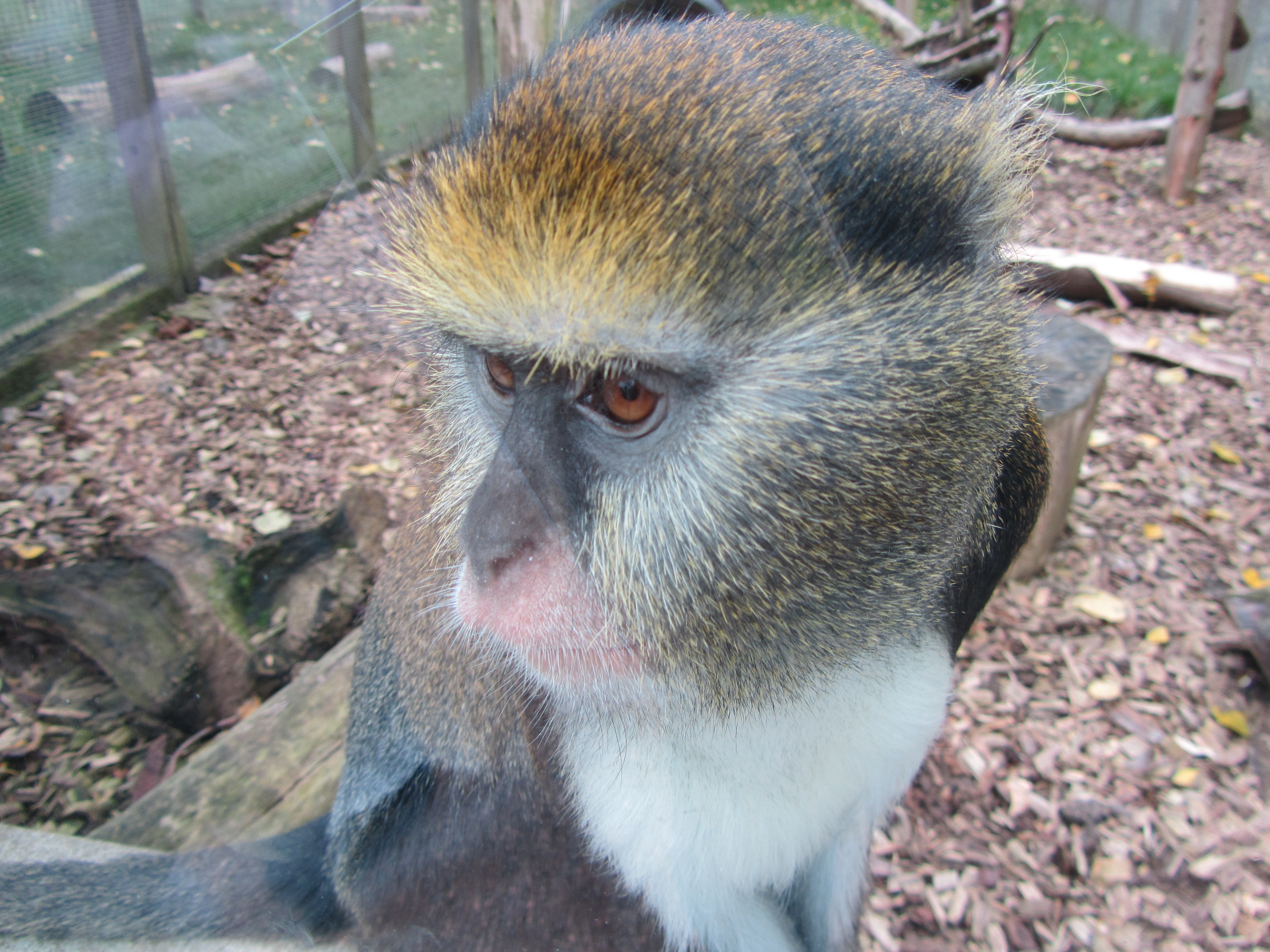

Conservation status
- Near Threatened (IUCN 3.1)

Scientific classification
- Kingdom: Animalia
- Phylum: Chordata
- Class: Mammalia
- Order: Primates
- Family: Cercopithecidae
- Genus: Cercopithecus
- Species: C. campbelli

Binomial name
- Cercopithecus campbelli Waterhouse, 1838
- Combined geographic distribution of Campbell's mona monkey and Lowe's mona monkey

= Campbell's mona monkey =

Species of Old World monkey

Campbell's mona monkey (Cercopithecus campbelli), also known as Campbell's guenon and Campbell's monkey, is a species of primate in the family Cercopithecidae found in the Ivory Coast, Gambia, Ghana, Guinea, Guinea-Bissau, Liberia, Senegal, and Sierra Leone. It was named for Henry Dundas Campbell, in 1838. Lowe's mona monkey was previously considered a subspecies of Campbell's mona monkey. The International Union for Conservation of Nature has rated this species as being a near-threatened species because it has a wide range and is able to adapt to degraded habitats.

== Distribution and habitat ==
Campbell's mona monkey is native to Senegal, Gambia, Guinea-Bissau, Guinea, Sierra Leone and Liberia as far east as the Cavally River on the border with Ivory Coast, and also the island of Caravela, off Guinea Bissau. Its habitat is lowland forest, both primary and secondary, gallery forest, mangrove swamps, agricultural land and scrubland.

== Ecology ==
Campbell's mona monkey is a sociable and territorial species, living in small groups of about eight individuals. Around dawn and dusk, the dominant male climbs to a perch on an emergent tree and issues a series of booms. The sound carries for at least a kilometre, and other males join in. This monkey often associates with monkeys of other species and engages in inter-species territorial calling which obey certain ritual rules. This species has one of the more advanced forms of animal communication, with a rudimentary syntax.

Campbell's mona monkey is a slow, deliberate forager. The greater part of its diet is wild and cultivated fruit, but it also eats seeds, invertebrates, grubs, small amphibians and lizards.
