= Road-effect zone =

The Road-effect zone is the area in which effects on the natural environment extend outward from a road. Such effects are substance emissions like carbon monoxide, carbon dioxide, particulate matter, nitrogen oxide, volatile organic compounds, biological matter, rubber, or salt, intangible emissions like noise or light, and changes of the microclimate like alterations of wind, water flows, temperature or moisture.

== Range ==
There is ongoing debate on the width of the road-effect zone, sometimes also called buffer area. Most studies conform to an extension that can range from as little as 20 meters to a width up to two or more kilometers. Jordaan et al. find an area of 100 meters significantly impacted, Biglin & Dupigny-Giroux estimate 71.25% of the total impact to lie within the first 300 meters, Deblinger & Forman suggest an average area of 600 meters to be concerned, and Eigenbrod et al. found a considerably negative effect on differing anuran species for areas of 250 to 1.000 meters.

== Species affected ==
Determining the size of the road-effect zone is additionally complicated by varying local spatial patterns and the result significantly depends on the particular species under investigation; for instance there are large differences between moose, mice, plants, bats or anurans, and even among anuran species themselves.

== Challenges ==
The road-effect zone is a topic that, due to drastically increased mobility-intensive lifestyles, and due to the cognition of their adverse effects on the non-human environment or biological diversity in total, has gained augmented interest in the recent past. Its impact on, and integration in to, spatial planning are challenges to be dealt with today and tomorrow to a greater degree.

== See also ==
- Edge effects
- Line source
- Low-emission zone
- Road barrier effect
- Road ecology
