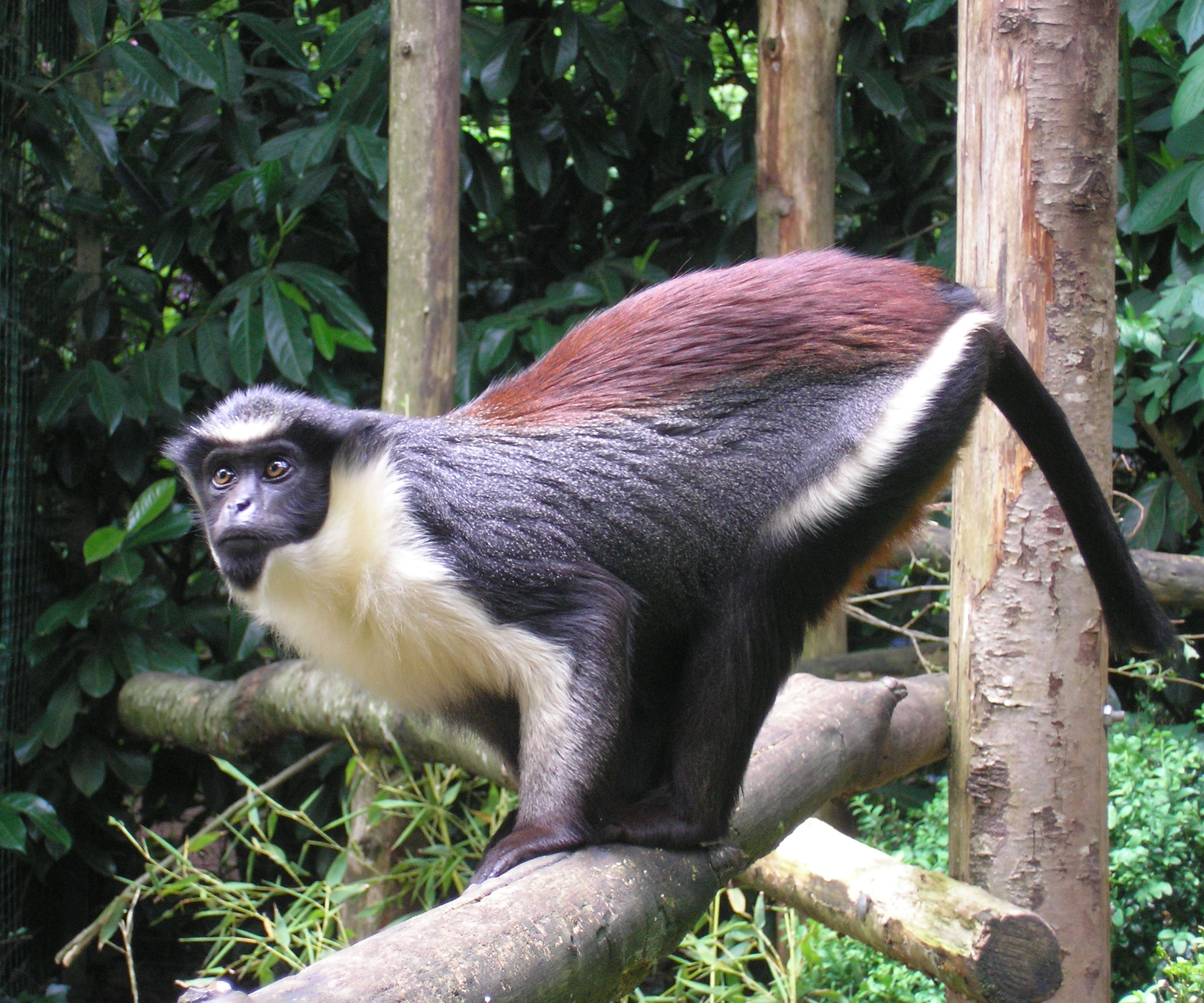
- Diana monkey (C. diana)

Scientific classification
- Kingdom: Animalia
- Phylum: Chordata
- Class: Mammalia
- Order: Primates
- Family: Cercopithecidae
- Subfamily: Cercopithecinae
- Tribe: Cercopithecini
- Genus: Cercopithecus; Linnaeus, 1758

Type species
- Simia diana Linnaeus, 1758

Species
- See text

= Guenon =

Guenons

Genus of Old World monkeys

The guenons (UK: /ɡəˈnɒnz/, US: /ˈɡwɛn.ənz/) are Old World monkeys of the genus Cercopithecus (/ˌsɜːrkəˈpɪθəkəs/). Not all members of this genus have the word "guenon" in their common names — mona monkeys, blue monkeys, De Brazza's monkeys, and Diana monkeys are all guenons.

Members of the genus are endemic to sub-Saharan Africa, and most are forest monkeys. Many of the species are quite local in their ranges, and some have even more local subspecies. Many are threatened or endangered because of habitat loss.

Guenons are sexually dimorphic, with males nearly twice the size of females. Most animals live in one-male groups, though males may live alone or spread out in bachelor groups.

== Classification ==
The genus name Cercopithecus comes from Ancient Greek κέρκος (kérkos), meaning "tail", and πίθηκος (píthēkos), meaning "ape". It was named by Carl Linnaeus in 1758.

Because of changes in scientific classification, some monkeys previously included in this genus are no longer. Vervet monkeys and green monkeys, for example, were formerly considered as a single species in this genus (Cercopithecus aethiops) but are currently in the genus Chlorocebus.

In the English language, the word "guenon" is apparently of French origin. In French, guenon was the common name for all species and individuals, both males and females, from the genus Cercopithecus. In all other monkey and apes species, the French word guenon designates only the females. The three species such as the L'hoest's monkey, Preuss's monkey and the sun-tailed monkey were formerly included in the genus and now listed in a different genus Allochrocebus.

== Species list ==
Genus Cercopithecus – Linnaeus, 1758 – nineteen species
Common name	Scientific name and subspecies	Range	Size and ecology	IUCN status and estimated population
Blue monkey	C. mitis Wolf, 1822 Sixteen subspecies: C. m. albogularis (Sykes' monkey); C. m. albotorquatus; C. m. boutourlinii (Boutourlini's blue monkey); C. m. doggetti (silver monkey); C. m. erythrarchus; C. m. heymansi (Lomami River blue monkey); C. m. kandti (golden monkey); C. m. kolbi; C. m. labiatus; C. m. manyaraensis; C. m. mitis (Pluto monkey); C. m. moloneyi; C. m. monoides; C. m. opisthostictus; C. m. stuhlmanni (Stuhlmann's blue monkey); C. m. zammaranoi	Sub-Saharan Africa	Size: 31–70 cm (12–28 in) long, plus 55–109 cm (22–43 in) tail Habitat: Forest Diet: Fruit and leaves, as well as invertebrates	LC Unknown
Campbell's mona monkey	C. campbelli Waterhouse, 1838	Western Africa	Size: 36–55 cm (14–22 in) long, plus 49–85 cm (19–33 in) tail Habitat: Forest, savanna, and shrubland Diet: Fruit, leaves, seeds and grains, as well as birds, bird eggs, small reptiles, and insects	NT Unknown
Crested mona monkey	C. pogonias Bennett, 1833 Three subspecies: C. p. grayi (Gray's crested mona); C. p. nigripes (Black-footed crested mona); C. p. pogonias (Golden-bellied crested mona)	Central Africa	Size: 34–55 cm (13–22 in) long, plus 48–87 cm (19–34 in) tail Habitat: Forest Diet: Fruit and seeds, as well as leaves, flowers and insects	NT Unknown
De Brazza's monkey	C. neglectus Schlegel, 1876	Central Africa	Size: 39–60 cm (15–24 in) long, plus 47–79 cm (19–31 in) tail Habitat: Inland wetlands and forest Diet: Fruit, as well as leaves, flowers, mushrooms, beetles, termites, and worms	LC Unknown
Dent's mona monkey	C. denti Thomas, 1907	Central Africa	Size: 40–70 cm (16–28 in) long, plus 70–90 cm (28–35 in) tail Habitat: Forest Diet: Fruit and arthropods, as well as flowers, caterpillars, shoots, and leaves	LC Unknown
Diana monkey	C. diana (Linnaeus, 1758)	Western Africa	Size: 40–55 cm (16–22 in) long, plus 50–75 cm (20–30 in) tail Habitat: Forest Diet: Fruit, flowers, leaves, insects, and other invertebrates	EN Unknown
Greater spot-nosed monkey	C. nictitans (Linnaeus, 1766) Five subspecies: C. n. insolitus; C. n. ludio; C. n. martini; C. n. nictitans; C. n. stampflii	Western Africa	Size: 40–57 cm (16–22 in) long, plus 56–100 cm (22–39 in) tail Habitat: Forest Diet: Fruits and seeds, as well as leaves and insects	NT Unknown
Hamlyn's monkey	C. hamlyni Pocock, 1907 Two subspecies: C. h. hamlyni; C. h. kahuziensis	Central Africa	Size: 43–63 cm (17–25 in) long, plus 49–63 cm (19–25 in) tail Habitat: Forest Diet: Shoots, leaves, plants, and herbs, as well as fruit and seeds	VU Unknown
Lesser spot-nosed monkey	C. petaurista (Schreber, 1774) Two subspecies: C. p. buettikoferi; C. p. petaurista	Western Africa	Size: 29–53 cm (11–21 in) long, plus 57–78 cm (22–31 in) tail Habitat: Forest Diet: Fruit as well as insects	NT Unknown
Lesula	C. lomamiensis Hart et al., 2012	Central Africa	Size: 40–65 cm (16–26 in) long, plus 40–65 cm (16–26 in) tail Habitat: Forest Diet: Leaves, fruits and flowers	VU Unknown
Lowe's mona monkey	C. lowei Thomas, 1923	Western Africa (in green)	Size: 36–55 cm (14–22 in) long, plus 54–85 cm (21–33 in) tail Habitat: Forest and savanna Diet: Fruit and insects	VU 10,000
Mona monkey	C. mona (Schreber, 1774)	Western Africa	Size: 32–53 cm (13–21 in) long, plus 67–90 cm (26–35 in) tail Habitat: Forest Diet: Fruit, sprouts, leaves, and invertebrates	NT Unknown
Moustached guenon	C. cephus (Linnaeus, 1758) Three subspecies: C. c. cephodes; C. c. cephus; C. c. ngottoensis	Western Africa	Size: 44–60 cm (17–24 in) long, plus 66–99 cm (26–39 in) tail Habitat: Forest Diet: Fruit, as well as seeds, leaves, insects, and eggs	LC Unknown
Red-eared guenon	C. erythrotis Waterhouse, 1838 Two subspecies: C. e. camerunensis (Cameroon Red-eared Monkey); C. e. erythrotis (Bioko Red-eared Monkey)	Western Africa	Size: 36–55 cm (14–22 in) long, plus 46–77 cm (18–30 in) tail Habitat: Forest Diet: Fruit, as well as leaves, shoots and arthropods	VU Unknown
Red-tailed monkey	C. ascanius (Audebert, 1799) Five subspecies: C. a. ascanius; C. a. atrinasus; C. a. katangae; C. a. schmidti; C. a. whitesidei	Central Africa	Size: 34–55 cm (13–22 in) long, plus 67–92 cm (26–36 in) tail Habitat: Forest Diet: Fruit, as well as leaves, insects, flowers, buds, and tree gum	LC Unknown
Roloway monkey	C. roloway (Schreber, 1774)	Western Africa	Size: 44–62 cm (17–24 in) long, plus 70–91 cm (28–36 in) tail Habitat: Forest Diet: Insects, as well as seeds, fruit, and leaves	CR Unknown
Sclater's guenon	C. sclateri Pocock, 1904	Western Africa	Size: 32–38 cm (13–15 in) long, plus 61–85 cm (24–33 in) tail Habitat: Forest Diet: Fruit, as well as insects, flowers and leaves	EN Unknown
White-throated guenon	C. erythrogaster Gray, 1866 Two subspecies: C. e. erythrogaster (Red-bellied guenon); C. e. pococki (Nigerian white-throated guenon)	Western Africa	Size: 38–46 cm (15–18 in) long, plus 58–70 cm (23–28 in) tail Habitat: Forest and inland wetlands Diet: Fruit	EN Unknown
Wolf's mona monkey	C. wolfi Meyer, 1891 Three subspecies: C. w. elegans; C. w. pyrogaster; C. w. wolfi	Central Africa	Size: 44–52 cm (17–20 in) long, plus 69–83 cm (27–33 in) tail Habitat: Forest Diet: Fruit, leaves, seeds, and flowers	NT Unknown

=== Hybrids ===
The red-tailed monkey (Cercopithecus ascanius) is known to hybridize with the blue monkey (C. mitis) in several locations in the wild in Africa.

== Sources ==
- Kingdon, Jonathan (2015). The Kingdon Field Guide to African Mammals (Second ed.). Bloomsbury Publishing. ISBN 978-1-4729-2531-2.
