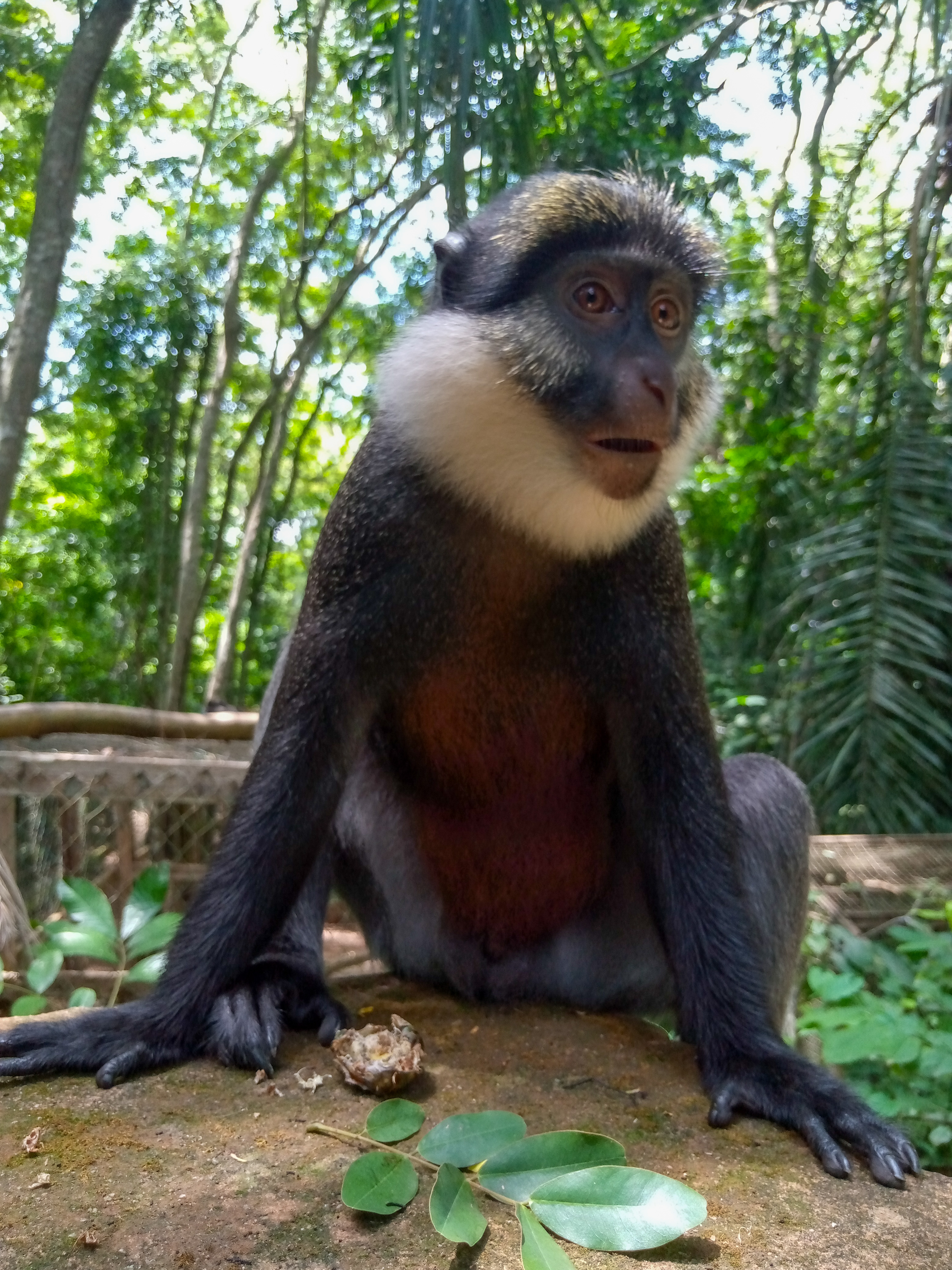

Conservation status
- Endangered (IUCN 3.1)

Scientific classification
- Kingdom: Animalia
- Phylum: Chordata
- Class: Mammalia
- Infraclass: Placentalia
- Order: Primates
- Family: Cercopithecidae
- Genus: Cercopithecus
- Species: C. erythrogaster

Binomial name
- Cercopithecus erythrogaster J. E. Gray, 1866
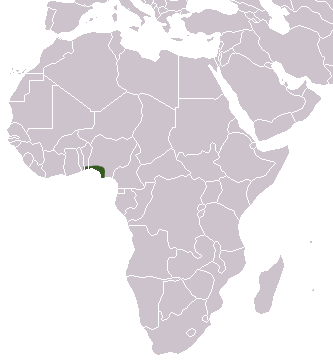
- White-throated guenon range

= White-throated guenon =

Species of Old World monkey

The white-throated guenon (Cercopithecus erythrogaster), also known as the red-bellied monkey and the red-bellied guenon, is a diurnal primate that lives on trees of rainforests or tropical areas of Nigeria and Benin.

The white-throated guenon is usually a frugivore but insects, leaves, and crops are also in its diet. It usually lives in small groups of four to five individual monkeys however, there have been groups of 30 discovered, and in cases, some males wander alone. It is arboreal, living in moist tropical forest and the wettest parts of dry tropical forest, however it can also be found in secondary bush and old farmland.

Males weigh from 3.5–4.5 kg and females weigh 2–4 kg. Females give birth to one offspring, which is a factor of decreasing population.

The white-throated guenon was once considered extinct due to constant hunting for the fur of its unique red belly and white front legs. Yet, a small group was found near the Niger River in 1988.

The white-throated guenon is still considered an endangered species due to its decreasing population. It is present within Nigerian forest reserves and sacred groves in Benin but hunting and logging restrictions are difficult to enforce or nonexistent. It is one of the species that live in the Guinean Forests of the West Africa Biodiversity Hotspot.

There are two subspecies of white-throated guenon:

- Red-bellied guenon, Cercopithecus erythrogaster erythrogaster
- Nigerian white-throated guenon, Cercopithecus erythrogaster pococki
