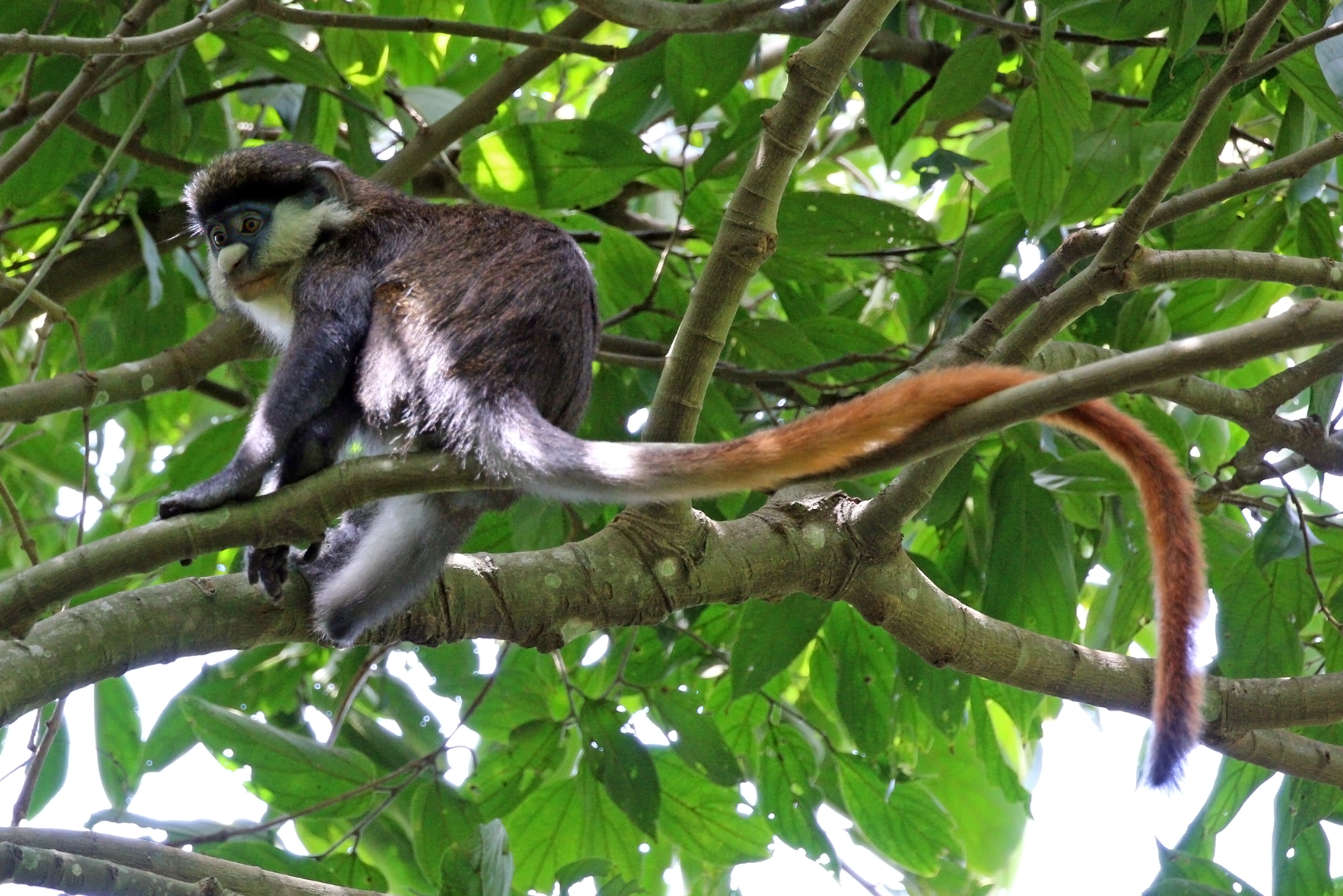
- Semliki Wildlife Reserve, Uganda

Conservation status
- Least Concern (IUCN 3.1)

Scientific classification
- Kingdom: Animalia
- Phylum: Chordata
- Class: Mammalia
- Order: Primates
- Family: Cercopithecidae
- Genus: Cercopithecus
- Species: C. ascanius

Binomial name
- Cercopithecus ascanius (Audebert, 1799)
- Geographic range

= Red-tailed monkey =

Species of Old World monkey

The red-tailed monkey (Cercopithecus ascanius), also known as the black-cheeked white-nosed monkey, red-tailed guenon, redtail monkey, or Schmidt's guenon, is a species of primate in the family Cercopithecidae.

It is found in Angola, Central African Republic, Democratic Republic of the Congo, Kenya, Rwanda, South Sudan, Tanzania, Uganda, Zambia, and possibly Burundi. The red-tailed monkey is usually black, red, or orange. Although native to this region, it has spread north and south as well as it can survive in different habitats and under different conditions. It is a distinct creature in its habitats and is gradually becoming endangered due to deforestation and over-exploitation through hunting and predation.

== Taxonomy and classification ==
There are five subspecies recognized for this species:

- Cercopithecus ascanius ascanius
- Cercopithecus ascanius atrinasus
- Cercopithecus ascanius katangae
- Cercopithecus ascanius whitesidei
- Cercopithecus ascanius schmidti

== Anatomy ==
=== Distinguishing features ===
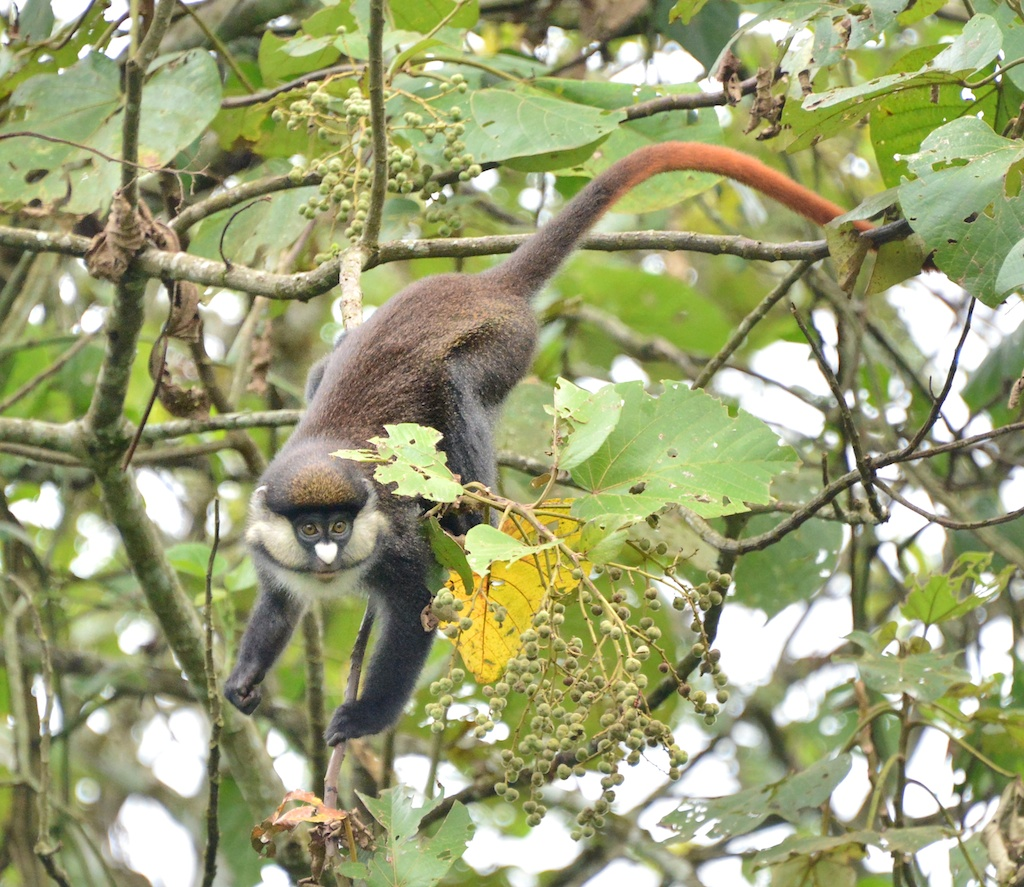
The species Cercopthecus ascanius in an arboreal habitat in Uganda, Africa.

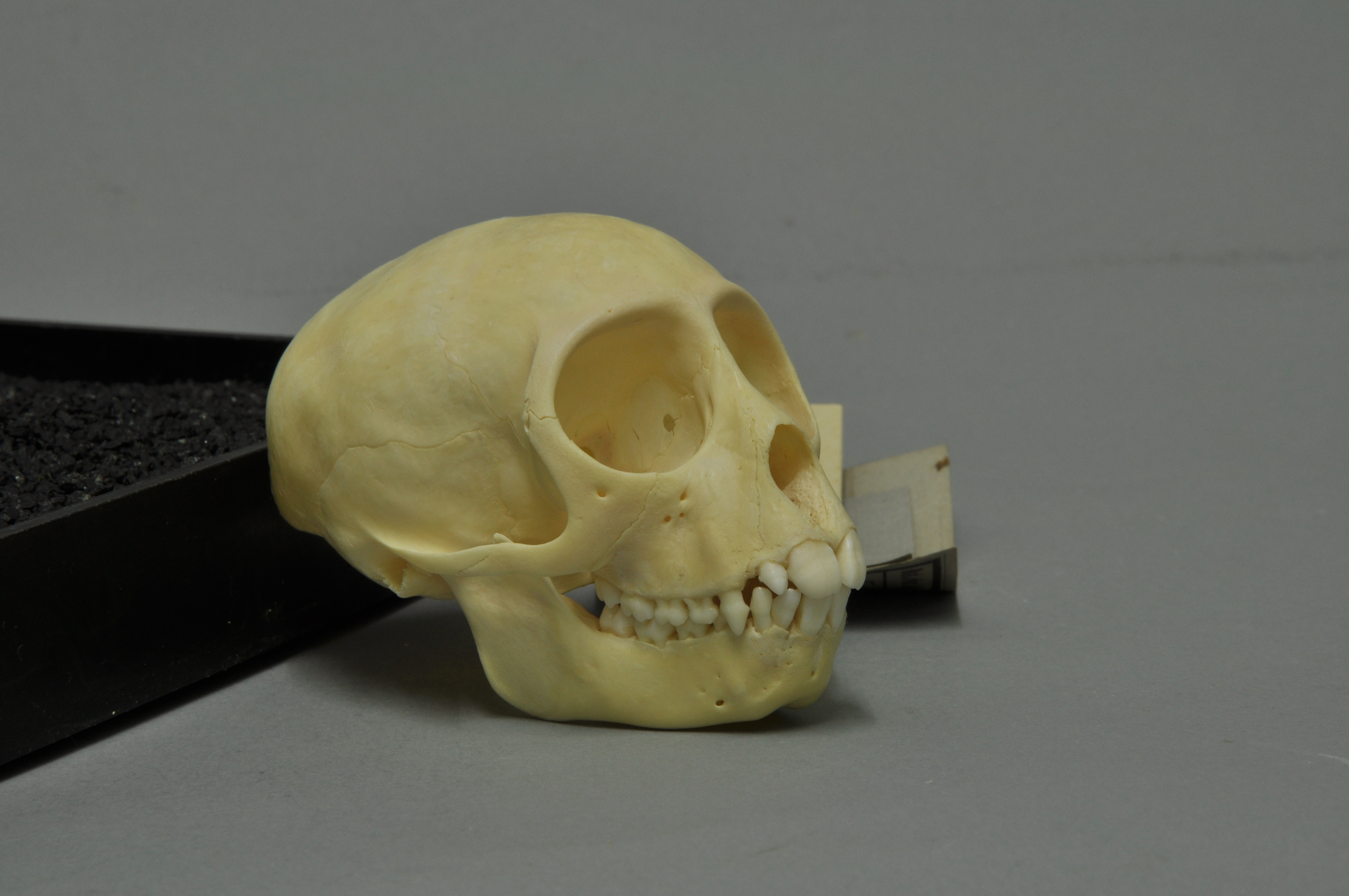
A skull at the Museum Wiesbaden in Wiesbaden, Germany

The red-tailed monkey is named as it sounds: for the red coloration of the tail's underside. The reddish color increases from the base of the tail to the tip. These mammals have a white nose and very large, elastic cheeks used for storing food in their mouths. They have black or dark grey body fur.

=== Size ===
Males are larger than the females. Body length ranges from 1 to 2 foot (12-24 inches), without the tail included, males being on the upper end of the scale and females being on the lower. Adult males also weigh between 7 and 10 pounds and females weigh slightly less between 6 and 8 pounds. The tail length can reach up to 35 inches long, which can be twice the body length for some red-tailed monkeys. The tail helps the monkeys achieve balance.

== Behavior ==
=== Communication and vocalization ===
Red-tailed monkeys communicate using different methods. Physical movements and vocal communication are used between members of social groups to demonstrate social dominance, submissiveness, or greeting. A soft, oscillating vocalization is used to indicate submission. Two red-tailed guenons will greet each other by touching their noses together, indicating affection or a willingness to play.

Visual communication is used as a sign of warning to others to stay away and as a defense against predators. Red-tailed monkeys practice staring or staring with their mouth open. When these monkeys implement staring, they lift their eyebrows to retract the skin on their forehead which makes the skin on the face expand backwards revealing the underneath of their eyelids. On the dark fur background, their eyelids can be seen very easily by others and understand it as a display that the red-tailed monkey is being threatened and the other species needs to stay away. Head-bobbing is another threat display in which the monkey moves its head up and down. These types of communication can be used separately or together depending on how threatened the monkey feels to its surroundings. Other types of communication are used such as chemical and olfactory communication; however, not much information is available on this type of communication.

=== Feeding habits ===
Red-tailed monkeys are primarily fructivorous, but are considered omnivorous because they will eat leaves, flowers, or insects in times where fruit is scarce. As they forage, these monkeys gather their findings in the expandable cheeks of their mouths. The pouches will hold a large amount of food where they can forage in one area and then carry their food away to another location where it is safe to consume without the threat of another stealing from them.

=== Social structure ===
Red-tailed monkeys are social primates that form groups that can range in size from 7 to 30 individuals. The groups consist of one dominant male and females and their offspring, male or female juveniles. Groups generally stay together through all periods of the day and through life, except for males who reach maturity. These males will leave the group they were born into and go on to form all male groups with other red-tailed monkey males or survive alone until they can replace the dominant male of a different social group. The females practice allomaternal care in which the various females in a group will help take care of their own young as well as the young of other females in the group. Often, the different social groups will congregate for support from each other when food is unlimited and in abundance.

Red-tailed monkeys have been observed interacting with blue monkeys, including interspecies grooming.

=== Activity and habitat ===
Red-tailed monkeys are active in the early morning and evening which is characterized as diurnal activity. They act as important seed dispersers as they collect fruit and other food items. Their dispersal is throughout the tropical forest of in East and Central Africa ranging to Kenya and many areas of the Congo. The red-tailed monkey species is categorized in recognized subspecies and these subspecies have different ranges, the subspecies C. a. schmidti having the widest distribution from Congo into countries of Kenya, Tanzania, and Uganda and the subspecies C. a. atrinasus having the smallest distribution restricted to a local habitat of Zovo, Angola. They are primarily arboreal but will come to the ground. In the trees, they are very active and travel at greater speeds than being on the ground. On the ground, they travel quadrupedally, on all four legs. While they show a dominating preference for being arboreal in activity and where they choose to rest, they forage on the ground and as a result, they spend an adequate amount of their time on the forest floor as well.

== Reproduction ==
Like all placental mammals, red-tailed monkeys produce viviparous young. They tend to only give birth to a single young per mating season. Their mating system is characterized as polygynous meaning that one male mates with multiple females and is a common sight in mammals due to advantages of the grouped social system. The most prominent and successful mating season is from the month of November extending into the month of February; however, breeding can occur throughout the course of an entire year. In some studies, it has been seen that the red-tailed monkey will interbreed and hybridize with another species in its genus: the blue monkey (C. mitis). The hybrids have been seen on the terrestrial island of Gombe, Tanzania, and this hybridization could serve a vital purpose in the reproduction of both the red-tailed and blue monkey species, and quite possibly, produce a new species in the future.

== Conservation status ==
Conservation efforts for the red-tailed monkey are of "least concern" as listed by the IUCN Red List of Threatened Species. This has been justified because this species of monkey is located at many different habitats throughout the Congo and throughout East-Central Africa. Also, the species is quite abundant in these areas and they have an average lifespan of about 28 years. The red-tailed monkey is subject to predation by crowned eagles, wild cats, and occasionally, humans and chimpanzees. Despite the influence of predation on their population, no major threat to this species in terms of endangerment is posed, although some locations of their habitat suffer from deforestation and hunting pressure as well.
