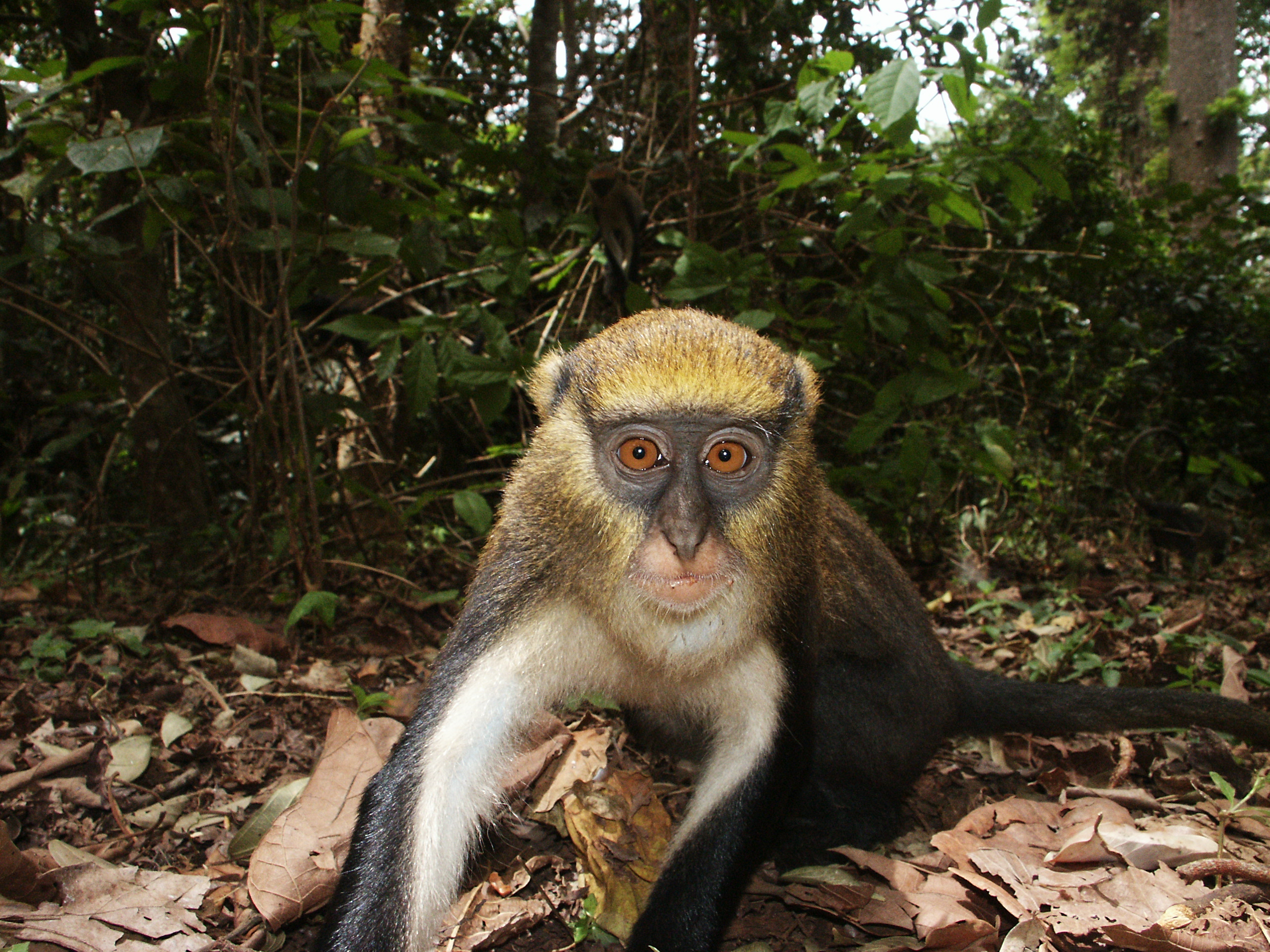
- Lowe's mona monkey in Mole Game Reserve, Ghana

Conservation status
- Vulnerable (IUCN 3.1)

Scientific classification
- Kingdom: Animalia
- Phylum: Chordata
- Class: Mammalia
- Infraclass: Placentalia
- Order: Primates
- Family: Cercopithecidae
- Genus: Cercopithecus
- Species: C. lowei

Binomial name
- Cercopithecus lowei Thomas, 1923

= Lowe's mona monkey =

Species of Old World monkey

Lowe's mona monkey (Cercopithecus lowei) is an Old World monkey in the family Cercopithecidae found from the Ivory Coast to Ghana. It was previously classified as a subspecies of Campbell's mona monkey C. campbelli. The species is named after the naturalist collector Willoughby Prescott Lowe.

== Predation ==
Predators of Lowe’s mona monkeys in Ivory Coast include Egyptian cobras.
