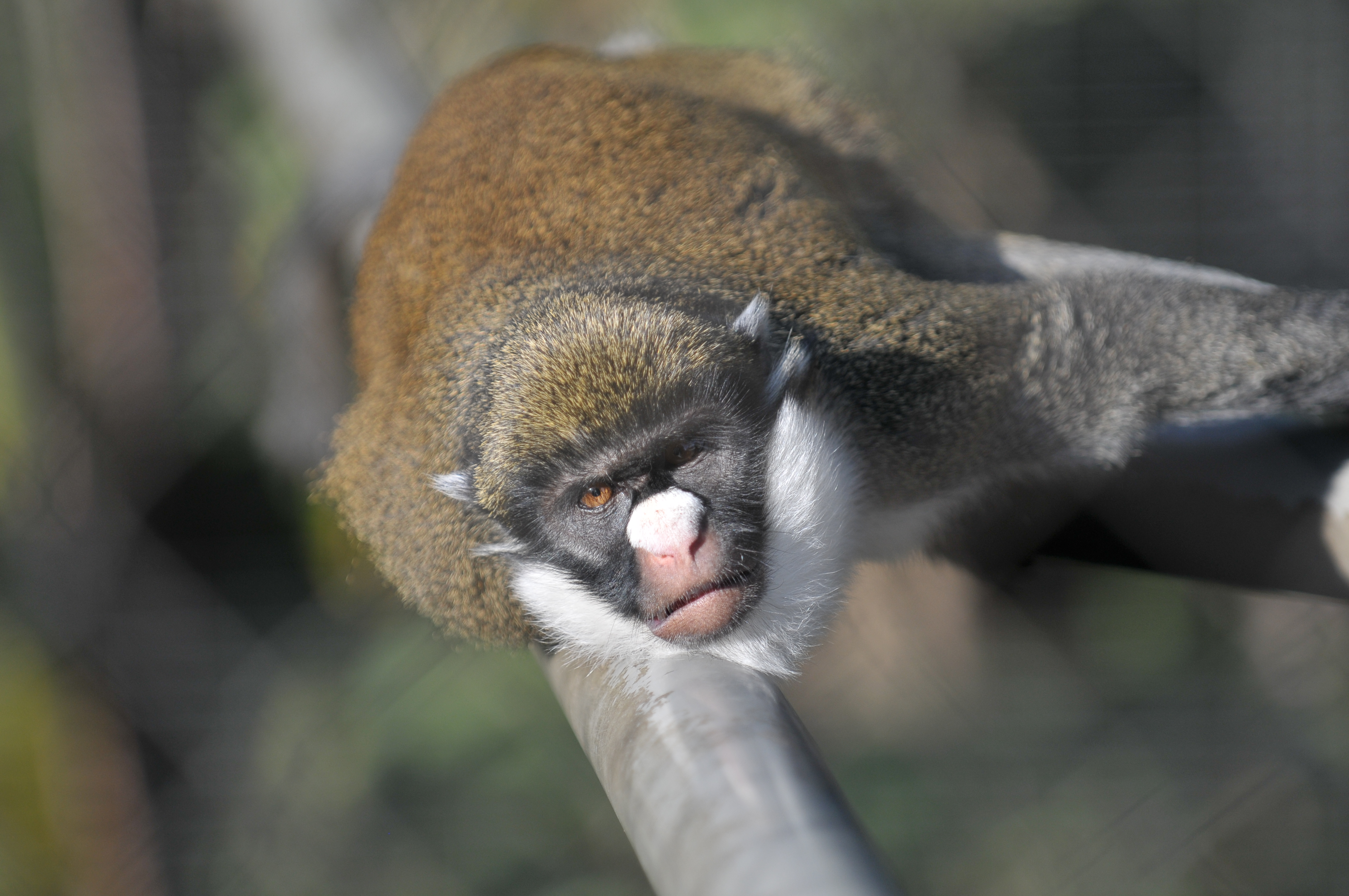
- At the San Diego Zoo

Conservation status
- Near Threatened (IUCN 3.1)

Scientific classification
- Kingdom: Animalia
- Phylum: Chordata
- Class: Mammalia
- Infraclass: Placentalia
- Order: Primates
- Family: Cercopithecidae
- Genus: Cercopithecus
- Species: C. petaurista

Binomial name
- Cercopithecus petaurista (Schreber, 1774)
- Geographic range

= Lesser spot-nosed monkey =

Species of Old World monkey

The lesser spot-nosed monkey (Cercopithecus petaurista), also known as the lesser spot-nosed guenon, lesser white-nosed guenon, or lesser white-nosed monkey, is a species of primate in the family Cercopithecidae. It is found in Ivory Coast, Ghana, Guinea, Liberia, Sierra Leone, Togo, Guinea-Bissau, and possibly Senegal.

== Description ==
The lesser spot-nosed monkey is a small arboreal species with a long tail. Its face is black with a white spot above its nose. A white stripe extends from the temple to below the ear. The fur of the crown, back, outer side of the limbs and upper surface of the tail are olive-green or khaki. In some forms, the middle and lower back have a reddish tinge. The individual hairs, especially on the crown, are flecked with black and yellow. The underparts, inner side of the limbs and underside of the tail are white or cream.

== Distribution and habitat ==
The species is found in West Africa. Its range includes Guinea-Bissau, Guinea, Sierra Leone, Liberia, Ivory Coast, Ghana and Togo, and it has also been recorded in southeastern Senegal. It is adaptable and is found in a range of habitats including primary and secondary forests, gallery forests, regenerating felled areas, coastal scrubland, bushy areas along farmland, and cultivated fields.

== Ecology ==
The lesser spot-nosed monkey is diurnal, arboreal and cryptic; it moves through the forest cautiously, seldom climbing to the high canopy but mostly frequenting the understorey layers and lianas. It forms social groups of about ten members: usually one adult male, several adult females and their young. It feeds on leaves, fruit, flowers and insects, gathering its food and storing it in cheek pouches; when these are full, they are prominent, its white throat resembling a snowball. The reproduction of this species has been seldom studied. Females give birth to a single young after a gestation period of about seven months. Breeding does not appear to be seasonal.

== Status ==
C. petaurista is a common and adaptable species. Some areas of forest in which it lives are being degraded but it is tolerant of the disturbance. It may be hunted for bushmeat in some areas, but the International Union for Conservation of Nature has not identified any major threats and has assessed its conservation status as being near-threatened.
