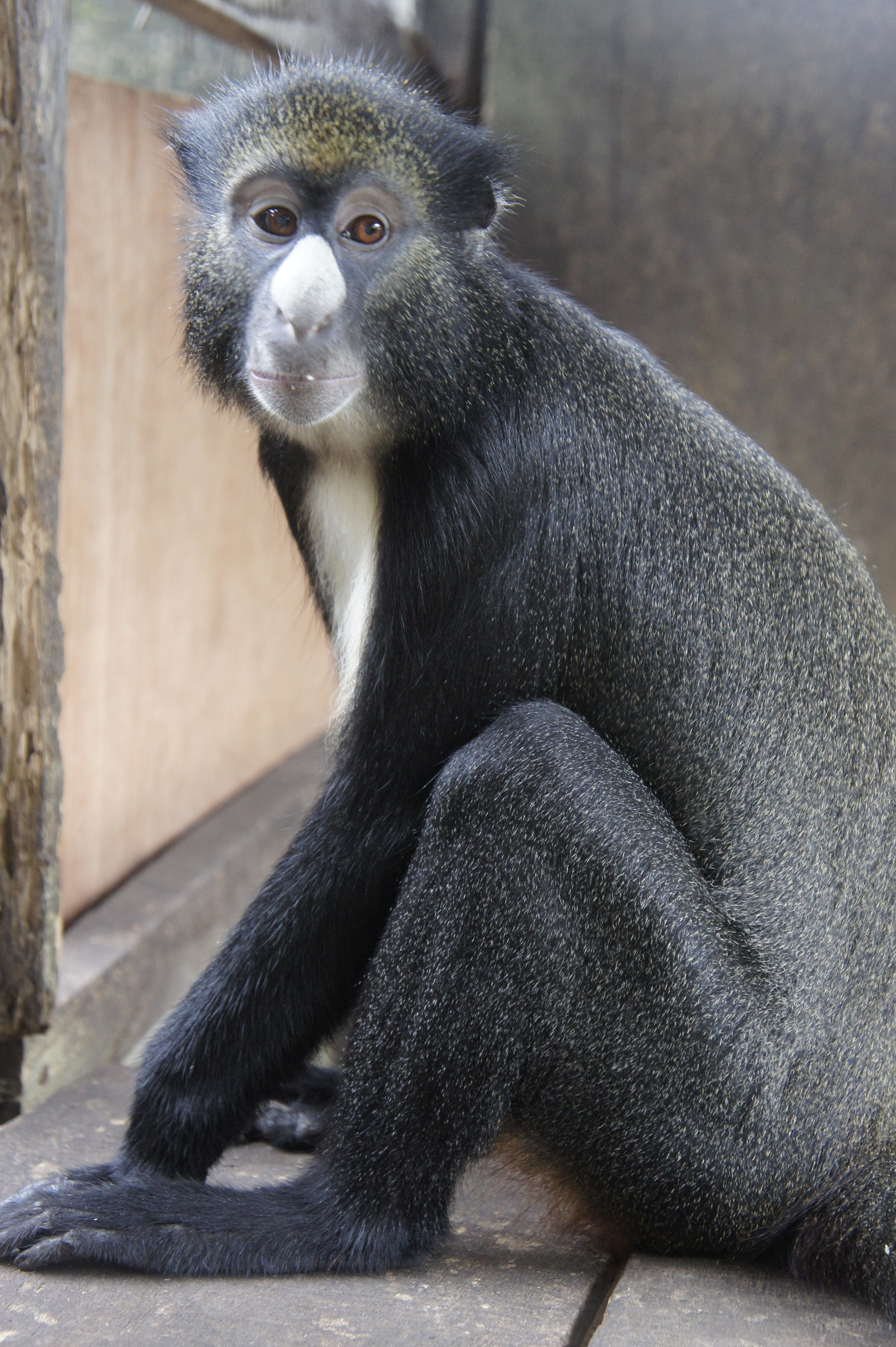

Conservation status
- Near Threatened (IUCN 3.1)

Scientific classification
- Kingdom: Animalia
- Phylum: Chordata
- Class: Mammalia
- Infraclass: Placentalia
- Order: Primates
- Family: Cercopithecidae
- Genus: Cercopithecus
- Species: C. nictitans

Binomial name
- Cercopithecus nictitans (Linnaeus, 1766)
- Geographic range

Synonyms
- Simia nictitans Linnaeus, 1766

= Greater spot-nosed monkey =

Species of Old World monkey

The greater spot-nosed monkey or putty-nosed monkey (Cercopithecus nictitans) is one of the smallest Old World monkeys. It is a guenon of the C. mitis group, native to West Africa and living to some extent in rain forests, but more often in the transition zone between rain forest and savannah. It is primarily arboreal and often associates with monkeys of other species. Both their common names come from the monkeys' prominent white nose.

The greater spot-nosed monkey lives in groups consisting of one adult male, a number of adult females, and their dependent offspring. Little recent research has been conducted into its behaviour, and most has concentrated on its auditory communication. Males use three call types which have been described as 'booms', 'pyows', and 'hacks'. These are used in a number of contexts including as alarm calls.

As in some other species of monkeys, the acoustical structure of greater spot-nosed monkey alarm calls it has been argued to vary according to the kind of predator spotted. The monkey reportedly combines different sounds into a sequence, which has an entirely different meaning from the sounds out of which it is made.

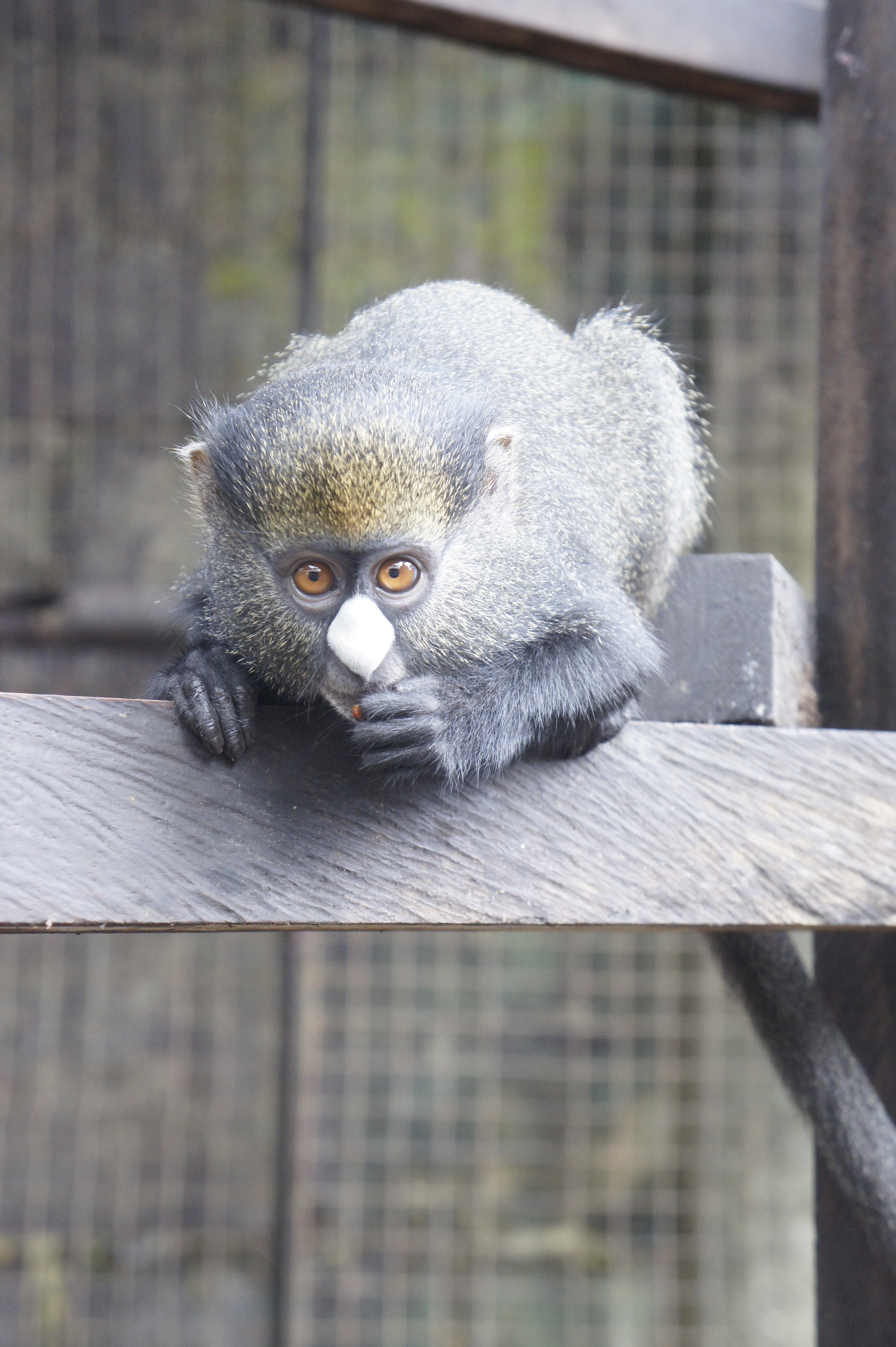

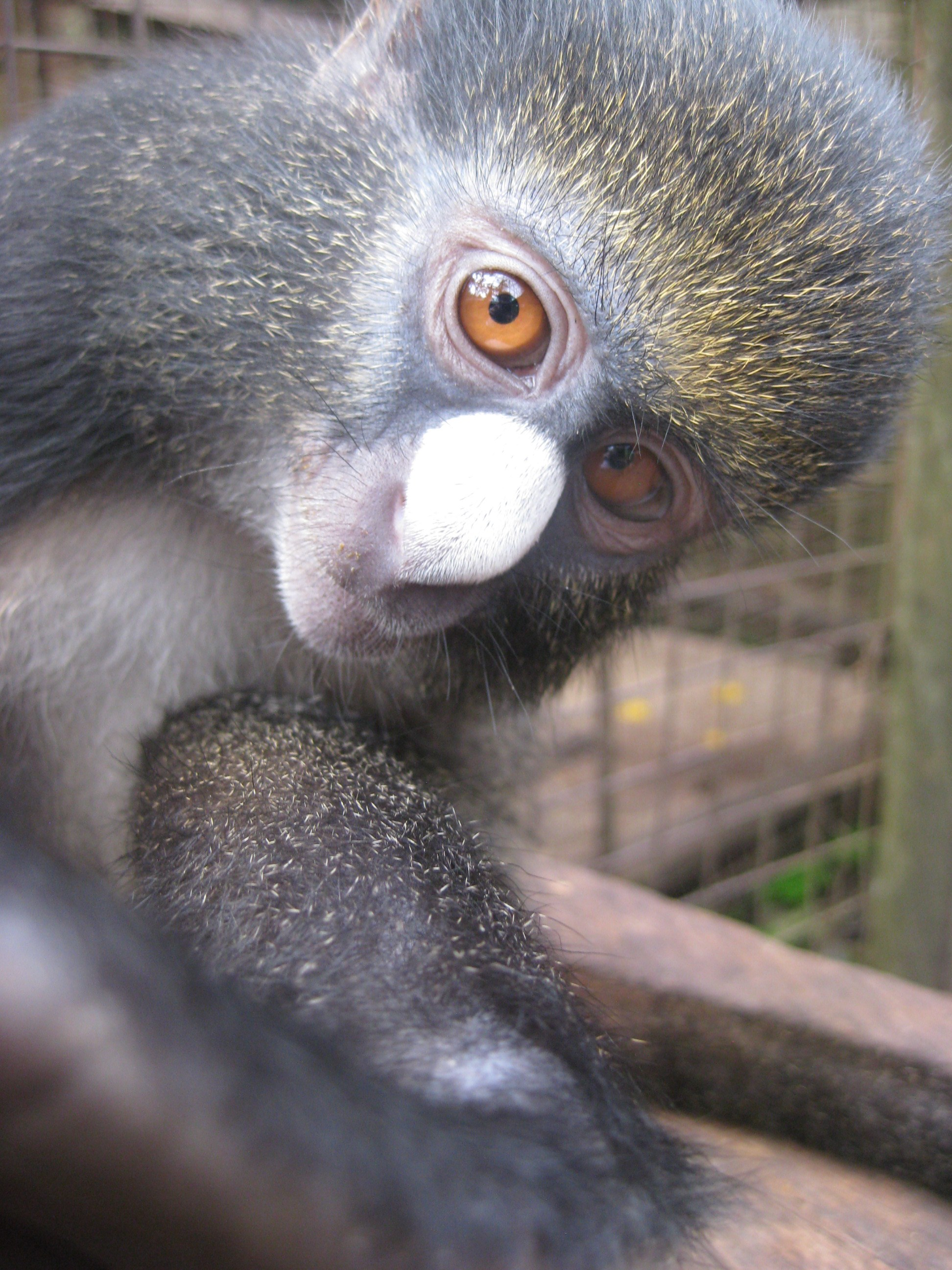
