= Doggett =

Doggett may refer to:

== Places ==
- 6363 Doggett (1981 CB1), a main-belt asteroid discovered in 1981
- Doggetts Fork, Virginia, an unincorporated community in the US state of Virginia

== People ==
- Bill Doggett (1916–1996), US jazz and rhythm and blues pianist and organist
- David Seth Doggett (1810–1880), US Bishop of the Methodist Episcopal Church
- Derrick Doggett (born 1984), Canadian professional football player
- Jerry Doggett (1916–1997), US sports broadcaster
- John Doget (died 1501), English diplomat, scholar, and Renaissance humanist.
- John Doggett (columnist) (born 1947), US political commentator
- John Doggett (politician) (1723–1772), Nova Scotia political figure
- Laurence L. Doggett (1864–1957), American educator, president of International YMCA College (modern Springfield College)
- Lloyd Doggett (born 1946), US politician from Texas
- Marjorie Doggett (1921–2010), animal rights activist in Singapore
- Mark Doggett (aka K90), British disc jockey
- Ruth Doggett (1881–1974), English artist
- Samuel Doggett (1871–1935), American jockey
- Thomas Doggett (c. 1640–1721), Irish actor
- Walter Grimwood Doggett (1876-1904), British naturalist who worked in Africa

== Other uses ==
- Doggett v. United States, a 1992 US Supreme Court case on the right to a speedy trial
- Doggett's Coat and Badge, the oldest rowing race in the world
- Doggett's Repository of Arts, a Boston (Massachusetts, USA) art gallery c.1821-1825, run by John Doggett
- John Doggett, fictional character in the Canadian-American FOX television series The X-Files
- Tiffany Doggett, a fictional character in the Netflix TV series Orange is the New Black
