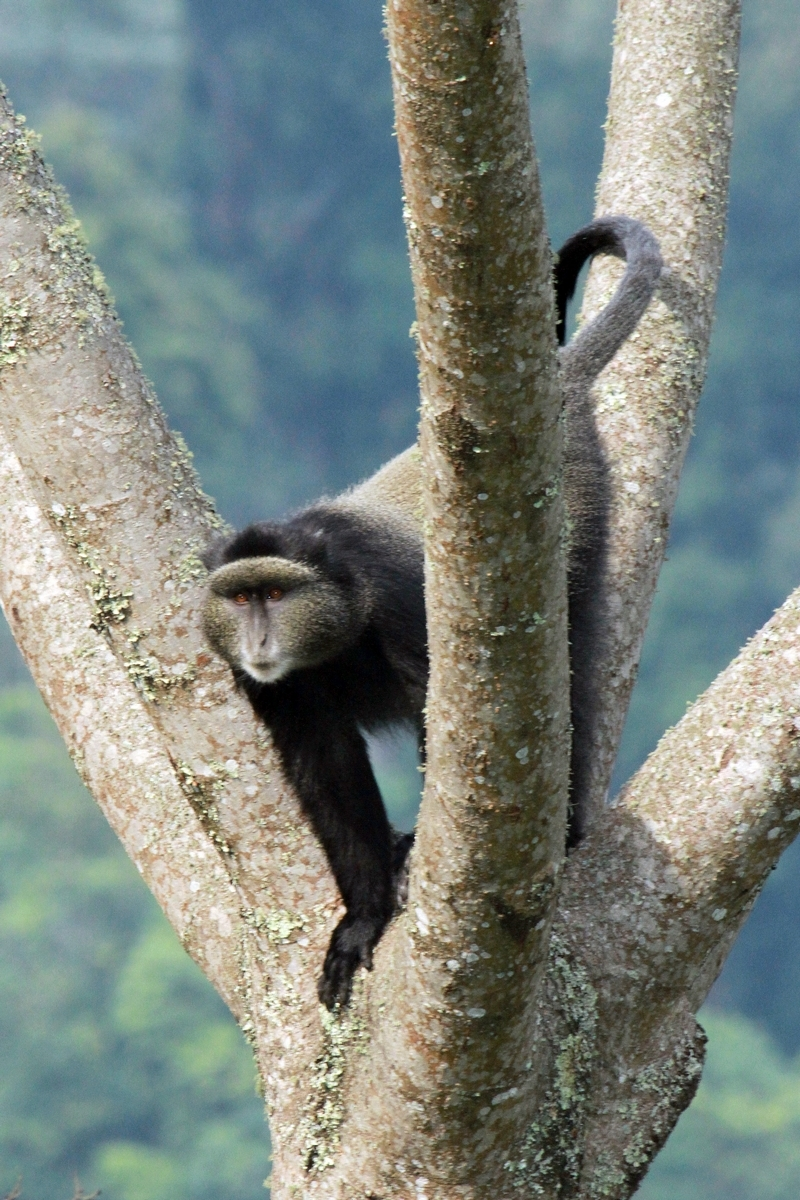
- Silver monkey perched in a tree

Conservation status
- Least Concern (IUCN 3.1)

Scientific classification
- Kingdom: Animalia
- Phylum: Chordata
- Class: Mammalia
- Order: Primates
- Family: Cercopithecidae
- Genus: Cercopithecus
- Species: C. mitis
- Subspecies: C. m. doggetti

Trinomial name
- Cercopithecus mitis doggetti Pocock, 1907

Synonyms
- sibatoi (Lorenz, 1913)

= Silver monkey =

Subspecies of Old World monkey

The silver monkey (Cercopithecus mitis doggetti) is a subspecies of the blue monkey (Cercopithecus mitis). It is an Old World monkey found primarily in East Africa. Its range includes Burundi, Tanzania, Rwanda, Uganda, and the Democratic Republic of the Congo. It was previously listed as a full species. The subspecies name commemorates the naturalist and collector Walter Grimwood Doggett.
