= Jeffrey Satinover =

American psychiatrist and physicist (born 1947)

- Born: September 4, 1947 (age 78); Chicago, Illinois
- Education: Massachusetts Institute of Technology; Harvard University; University of Texas; Yale University; C. G. Jung Institute in Zürich; University of Nice
- Occupations: Psychiatrist, psychoanalyst, physicist

Jeffrey Burke Satinover (born September 4, 1947) is an American psychiatrist, psychoanalyst, and physicist. He is known for books on a number of controversial topics in physics and neuroscience, and on religion, but especially for his writing and public-policy efforts relating to homosexuality, same-sex marriage and the ex-gay movement.

== Biography ==
Satinover was born in Chicago, Illinois, on September 4, 1947, to Joseph and Sena Satinover. He lived in and around Chicago until moving to California at the beginning of his high school years. Satinover won a National Merit Scholarship. He earned his Bachelor of Science degree at the Massachusetts Institute of Technology in 1971. He obtained a Master of Education degree in Clinical Psychology and Public Practice from Harvard University, a medical degree at the University of Texas, and a Master of Science in physics at Yale University. He received a diploma in analytical psychology from the C. G. Jung Institute of Zürich, becoming their youngest graduate. He trained there and became an accredited Jungian analyst. He received a PhD in physics in the laboratory of Didier Sornette at the University of Nice in France, in 2009.

He married for the second time in 1982, having previously divorced and is the father of three daughters. According to two journalists, in September 1991, during the confirmation hearings for U.S. Supreme Court Justice Clarence Thomas, Satinover suggested during dinner conversation with President Bush's nephew that Anita Hill, if suffering from erotomania (a "delusional disorder"), might be entirely convinced that Thomas had sexually harassed her, even if he had not, just as a witness for Thomas, John Doggett (now a conservative commentator), claimed had happened with him. She would even pass a lie detector test, as Hill had, convinced of the truth of what she was saying. Soon Satinover and another psychiatrist, Park Dietz were explaining this possibility to Thomas' Senate sponsor, John Danforth, and White House press secretary, Larry Thomas, though as psychiatrists neither would testify about a patient they had not examined. (Psychiatrists brought in by the Democrats similarly refused to testify.) Satinover was quoted as stating that once he saw the testimony of one of Hill's main critics, John Doggett, he concluded the idea was invalid.

He has provided commentary for two documentary films, What the #$*! Do We (K)now!? (2004) and What the Bleep!?: Down the Rabbit Hole (2006).

In 2008, he completed a Ph.D. summa cum laude in physics at the University of Nice, France.

Satinover was distinguished visiting professor of Math and Science at King's College, New York City, a private Christian college affiliated with Campus Crusade for Christ. He also teaches at the C. G. Jung Institute in Zürich. He is a visiting scientist at the Department of Management, Technology and Economics of the Swiss Federal Institute of Technology. He is managing director of Quintium Analytics, LLC, a proprietary investment advisory company he founded in 2007. Satinover was a member of the scientific advisory committee of the National Association for Research & Therapy of Homosexuality.

Satinover is Jewish, but says he has an eclectic worldview.

== Writing and research ==
Satinover's book, Homosexuality and the Politics of Truth (1996), published by the evangelical Christian publisher Baker Books, debates the nature of homosexuality from psychological, religious and scientific perspectives, discussing homosexuality primarily in the context of being a condition that can or should be treated, contrary to the views of the mainstream psychiatric and psychological community. Satinover draws comparisons between homosexuality and various pathologies (e.g., alcoholism, pedophilia) and argues that homosexuality involves compulsive impulses. He states that homosexuality "is not a true illness, though it may be thought an illness in the spiritual sense of 'soul sickness', innate to fallen human nature." He also argues that "gay activism distorts the truth and harms not only society, but homosexuals themselves". Most of the book discusses whether homosexuality is biological and genetic and if it can be changed. About one fifth of the book discusses human sexuality from Jewish and Christian perspectives. In the book's introduction, Satinover states that "[i]n the end the debate over homosexual behavior and its implications for public policy can only be decided conclusively on moral grounds, and moral grounds will ultimately mean religious grounds."

In 1997, Satinover was called by the State of Florida as an expert witness in Amer v. Johnson, which challenged Florida's law prohibiting adoption by gays and lesbians. "Surprisingly, Satinover said in his testimony that 'if two homosexuals wanted to adopt a child, I would have no objection to it if one of them was a man and one of them was a woman' [but] 'the 'needs' of a child includes having [both] a mother and a father'". He said that "The state of Florida wanted me to argue that the reason the ban should be upheld was because homosexuals made bad parents and I refused to do that." After several years of additional court cases relating to the Florida's anti-gay adoption ban, In re: Gill resulted in the ban being declared unconstitutional in 2010.

Satinover has frequently testified regarding his views on same sex marriage. In a hearing before the Massachusetts Judicial Committee in April 2003, he testified that homosexuality is not immutable and that the social environment plays an important role in sexual orientation. Organizations that oppose the expansion of LGBT rights and protections have frequently cited his research in their position papers.

== Selected works ==
- Feathers of the Skylark: Compulsion, Sin and Our Need for a Messiah (Hamewith Books, 1996)
- The Empty Self: Gnostic & Jungian Foundations of Modern Identity (Grove Books, 1995), 28 pp.
  - also as The Empty Self: C.G. Jung and the Gnostic Transformation of Modern Identity (Grove Books, 1996)
- Homosexuality and the Politics of Truth (Baker Books, 1996)
- The Truth Behind the Bible Code (Sidgwich Jackson, 1997)
- Cracking the Bible Code (1997, New York: W. Morrow, ISBN 0-688-15463-8)
- The Quantum Brain: The Search for Freedom and the Next Generation of Man (Wiley, 2002)
