= Genne Limiti =

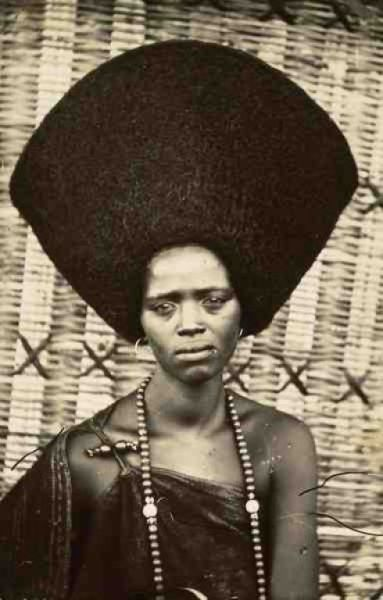
Genne Limiti of Jimma

Genne Limiti was a prominent royal Oromo figure from the late 19th and early 20th centuries of southwestern Ethiopia. She was the daughter of the King of Limmu, one of the five historic Gibe Kingdoms established by Oromo people in southwestern Ethiopia. She became the primary and favorite wife of King Abba Jifar II, who ruled the Oromo kingdom of Jimma. She is also remembered for her traditional Oromo hairstyle and fine leather clothing.

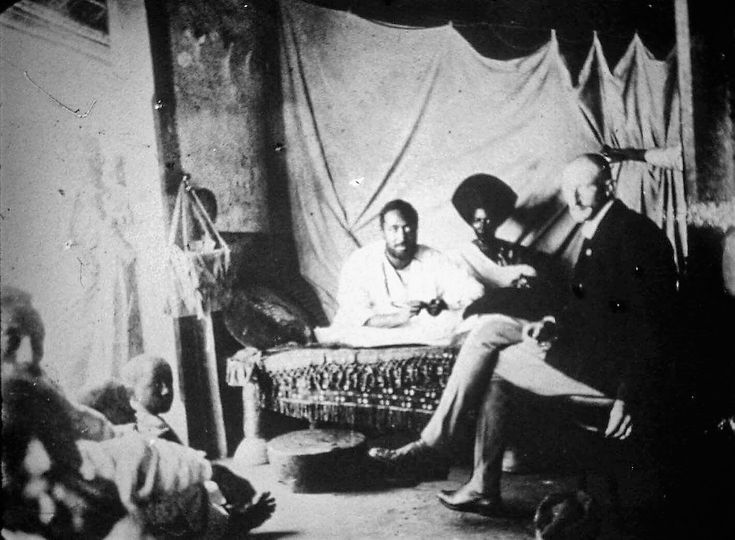
Abba Jifar with Genne Limiti and Freiherr Von Mylius 1905

Because of her political marriages and high-ranking status, historical photographs from around 1905 frequently capture her alongside King Abba Jifar II and visiting foreign dignitaries.

In Oromo language, "Genne" is a noble title meaning "the lady". Royal women of the Gibe region were traditionally addressed as Genne, followed by the territory or kingdom they originated from. Limiti stands for the Oromo Kingdom of Limmu (Limmu-Ennarea). When combined with her title, the name Genne Limiti translates to "The Lady of Limmu".
