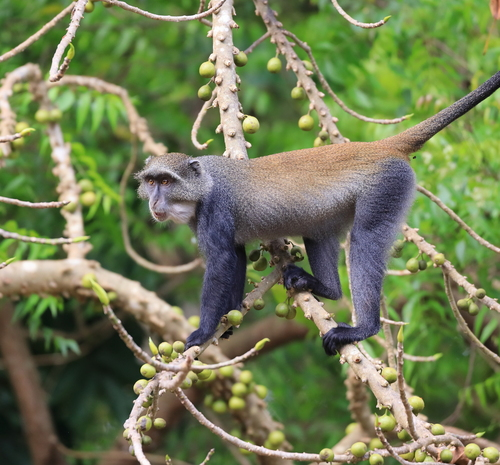
- Kinondo, Gazi, Kenya

Conservation status
- Least Concern (IUCN 3.1)

Scientific classification
- Kingdom: Animalia
- Phylum: Chordata
- Class: Mammalia
- Infraclass: Placentalia
- Order: Primates
- Family: Cercopithecidae
- Genus: Cercopithecus
- Species: C. mitis
- Subspecies: C. m. albogularis

Trinomial name
- Cercopithecus mitis albogularis (Sykes, 1831)
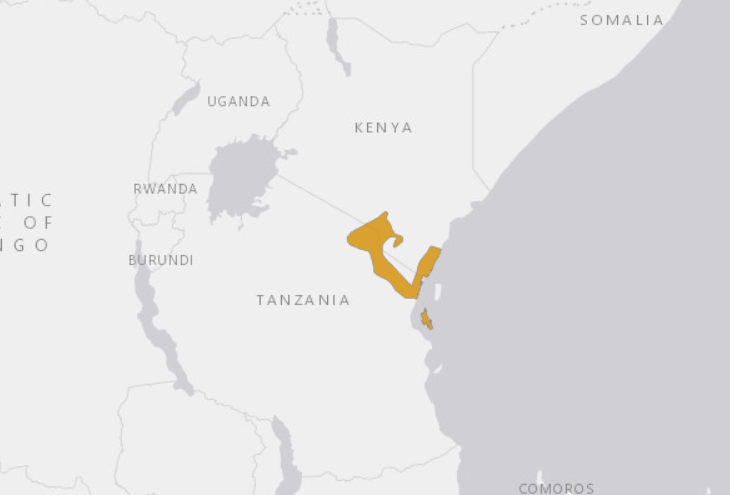
- Sykes' monkey geographical range

= Sykes' monkey =

Subspecies of Old World monkey

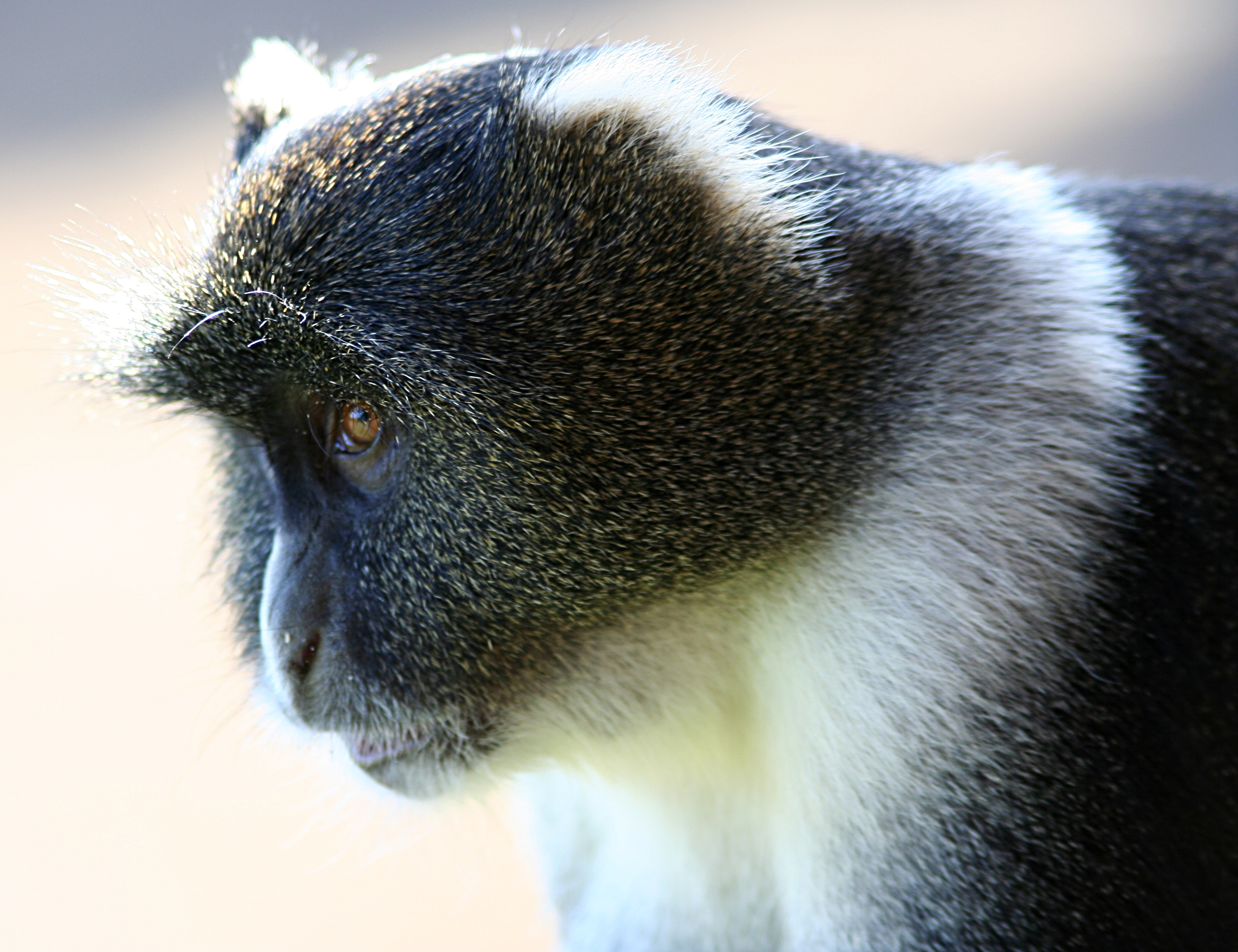
At Mount Kenya

Sykes' monkey (Cercopithecus mitis albogularis) is a subspecies of the blue monkey. As it used to be considered a species of its own with a dozen subspecies, it has several alternative common names. It is an Old World monkey found within Kenya and Tanzania. It is named after English naturalist Colonel William Henry Sykes (1790-1872), and has a large white patch on the throat and upper chest, and a grizzled (not blackish) cap. The species was described on the basis of a specimen in captivity that had been brought to Bombay aboard a ship.

== Taxonomy and classification ==
Sykes' monkey is traditionally treated as a subspecies within the broadly distributed blue monkey (Cercopithecus mitis) species. This approach is followed by global taxonomic authorities, including the International Union for Conservation of Nature (IUCN), which classifies Sykes' monkey as a subspecies of C. mitis rather than a distinct species.

The taxonomy of this monkey is complicated due to its placement within the broader nictitans/mitis superspecies, which predominantly compromises two main species complexes: the greater spot-nosed monkey (Cercopithecus nictitans) and the blue monkey (C. mitis). Older taxonomies list Sykes' monkey as a third species within this grouping based on genetic, morphological, and geographical distinctions. Molecular and morphological studies have revealed potential divergence among members of the C. mitis complex, including the albogularis populations, advocating for elevation to full species status.

The overlapping range and lack of reproductive isolation lead to extensive taxonomic uncertainty, with ongoing debate over whether albogularis should be considered a subspecies of C. mitis or as a distinct species. Nonetheless, taxonomic consensus remains unresolved and authorities continue to adopt the subspecies classification.

== Subspecies ==
Sykes' monkey was previous considered a species on its own. When it was, it had 12 subspecies:

- C. a. albogularis – Zanzibar Sykes' monkey
- C. a. albotorquatus – Pousargues' Sykes' monkey
- C. a. erythrarchus – white-throated guenon or Samango monkey
- C. a. francescae
- C. a. kibonotensis
- C. a. kolbi – Mount Kenya Sykes' monkey
- C. a. labiatus – White-lipped monkey or Samango monkey
- C. a. moloneyi
- C. a. monoides
- C. a. phylax
- C. a. schwarzi
- C. a. zammaranoi – Zammarano's white-throated guenon
