= Jimma Oromo women cultural clothing and hairstyle =

Cultural clothing

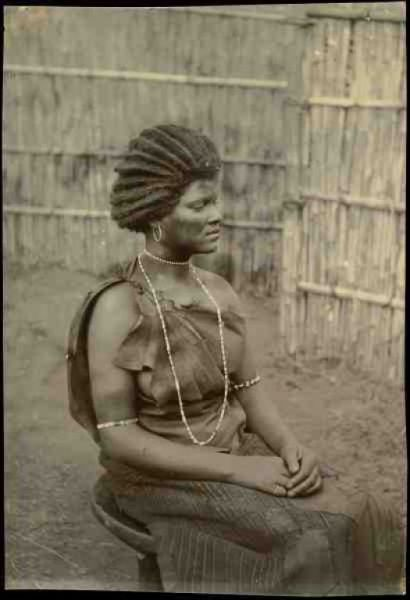
"Femme di Djimma" by Leopoldo Traversi.

Early descriptions of Jimma Oromo women's clothing and hairstyles were recorded by Antonio Cecchi during his travels in the Gibe region in 1879–1880, followed by Jules Borelli in the mid-1880s, and later by the Italian photographer Leopoldo Traversi in the 1880s. Their writings and photographs provide some of the earliest published images of dresses, adornment, and grooming practices in the Kingdom of Jimma, Ethiopia.

== Women's Clothing ==
Softened and decorated cowhide skirts, aprons, and capes are worn among Jimma Oromo women. Three main categories of skins, each with a specific name and cultural weight, are utilized.

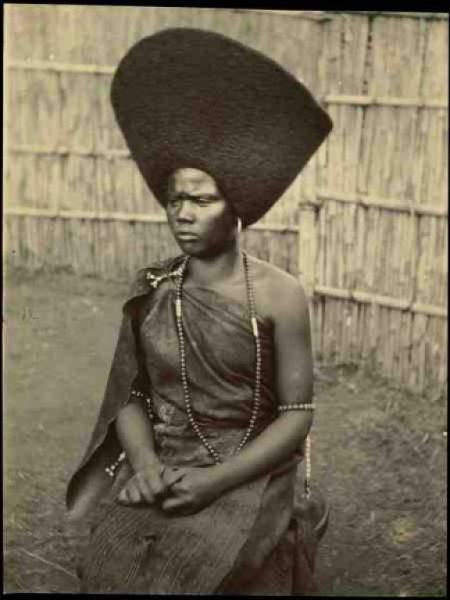
Jimma Oromo woman wearing qollo and wandabo (1880s).

=== Cowhide (Gogaa Loonii) ===
Cowhide is the primary material for women's garments, such as the wandabo, a wrap-around skirt.

==== Goat and Sheep Skin (Haduu / Gogaa Reeyee) ====
Goat and Sheep skins are used for lighter garments, including capes and undergarments. These skins were often treated with butter or oils. These are used for more intimate or flexible garments. These were frequently treated with butter or oils, which acted as both a preservative for the leather and a cosmetic for the skin.

==== Wild Animal Skins (Gogaa Bineensaa) ====
Skins from animals such as the colobus monkey or leopard were reserved for individuals of high status.

Skins of the Colobus monkey or leopard were strictly reserved for the Luba (those in the ruling age-grade of the Gadaa system) or for renowned warriors.

=== Specific Terminology ===
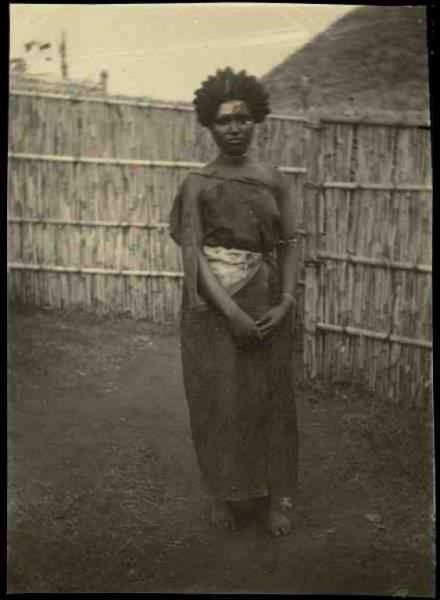
Oromo woman from Jimma, Ethiopia (1880s).

Wandabo: A wrap-around cowhide skirt.

Qollo: A skin worn over the shoulders.

Siraa: A layered leather wrap worn by men.

Gurda: A sacred leather string or thin belt tied around the waist.

These items were often embellished with beads or cowrie shells.

=== Preparation of Cowhide Garments ===
The preparation process, which included scraping, sun-drying, softening with oils or fats, repeated folding, and the addition of decorative elements. Some hides were smoked to increase durability.

== Hairstyles and Grooming ==
In early photographs, Jimma Oromo women are depicted wearing large, rounded coiffures. Plant fibers were sometimes used to support the structure.

== Jewelry and Ornamentation ==
Glass beads, cowrie shells, metal hoop earrings, and bead bracelets are used as jewelry.

== Courtly and Ceremonial Dress ==
Court women wear finely prepared cowhide garments and elaborate hairstyles reflecting the political and cultural prestige of the Jimma monarchy.

== Gallery ==
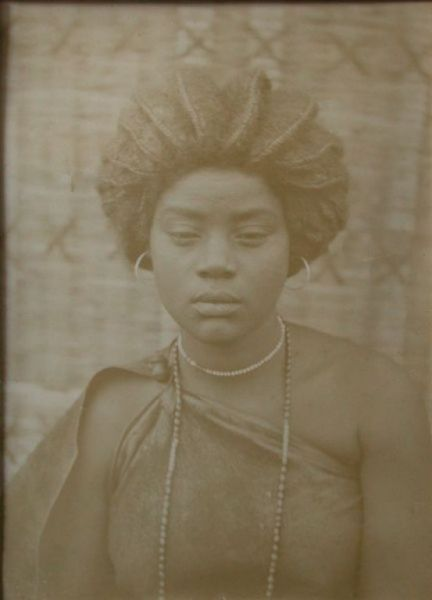

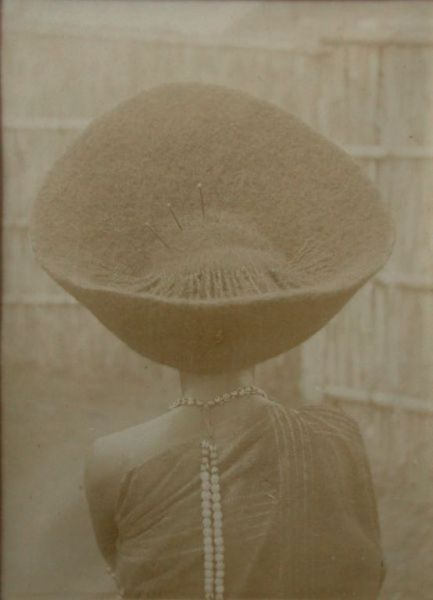

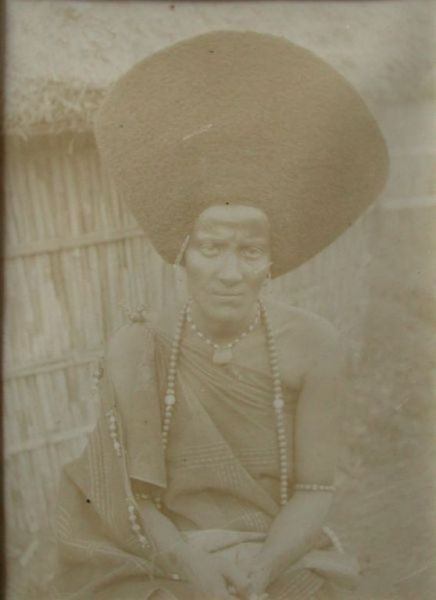

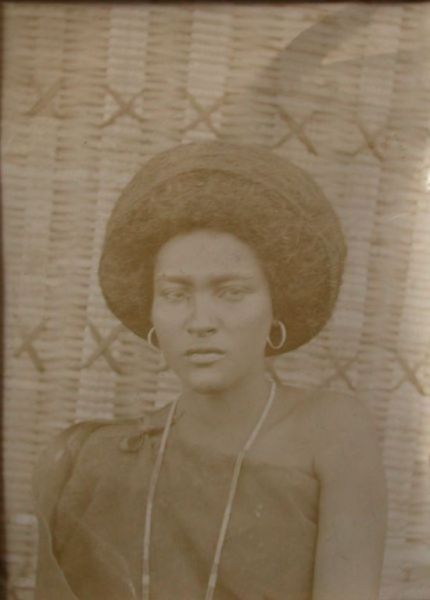

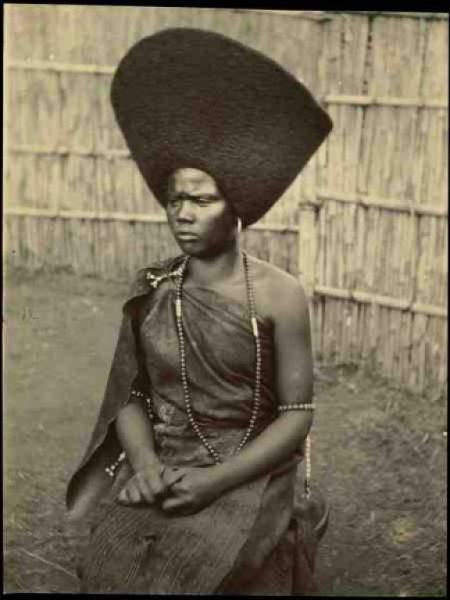

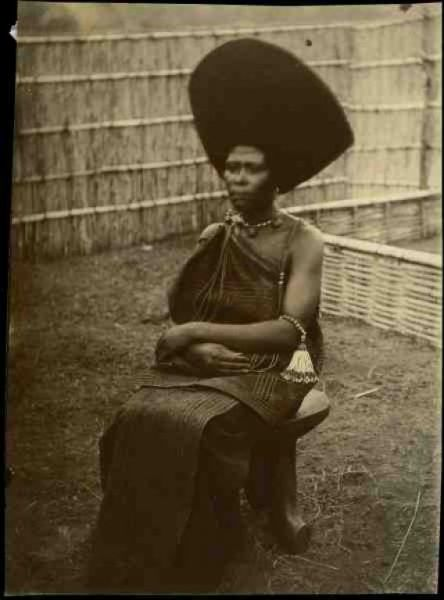

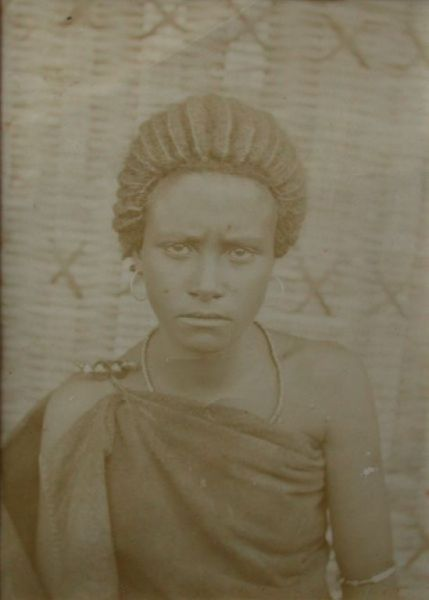

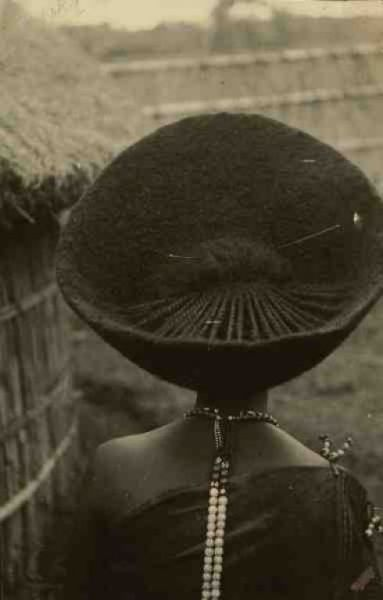

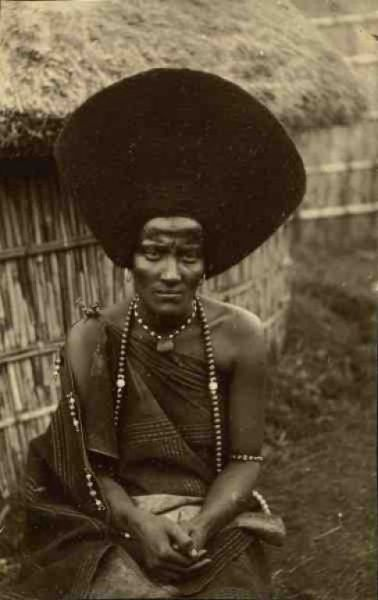

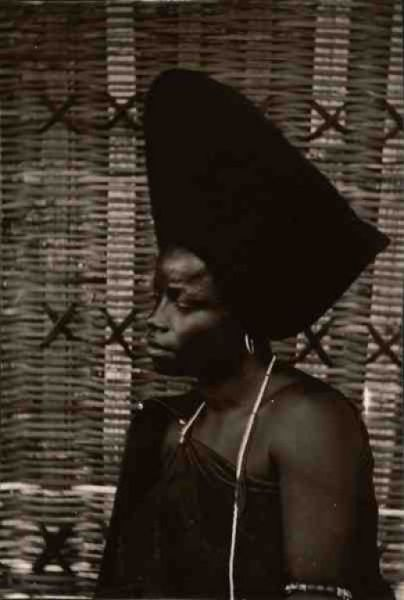

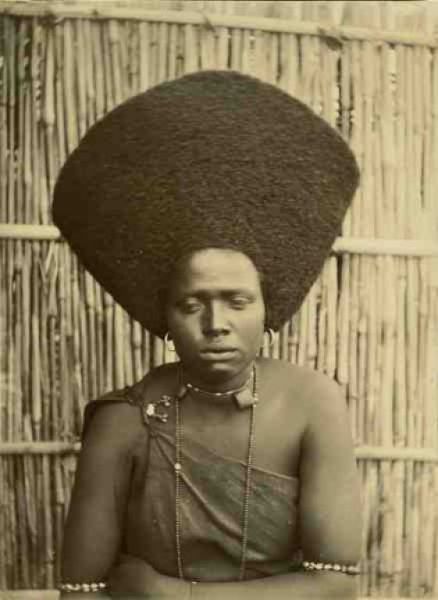

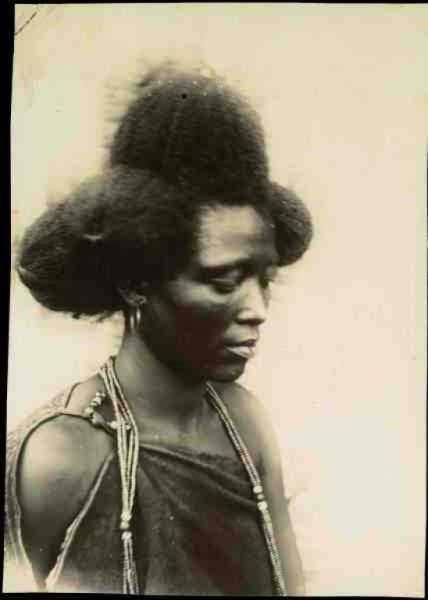

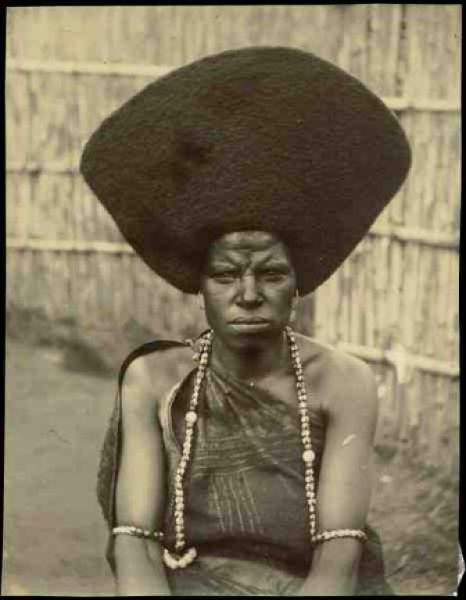

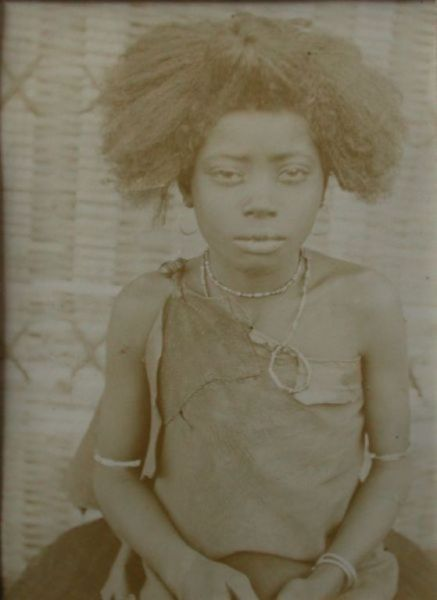

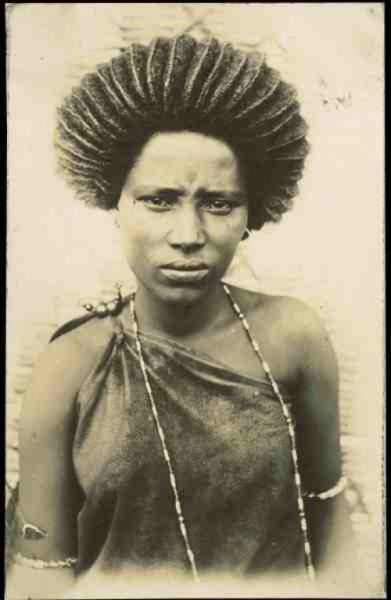

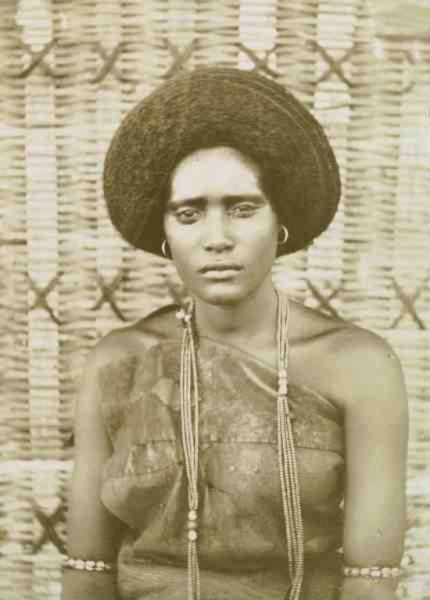

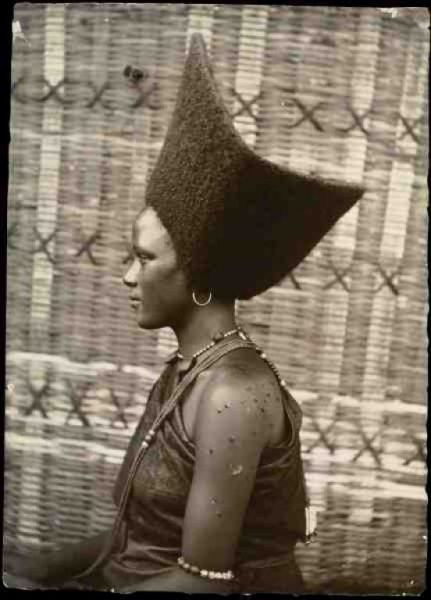

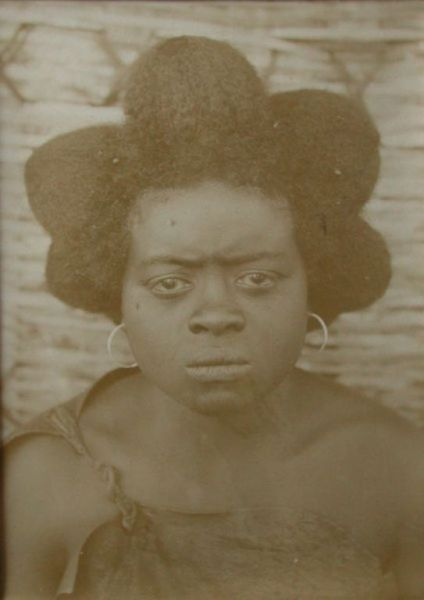

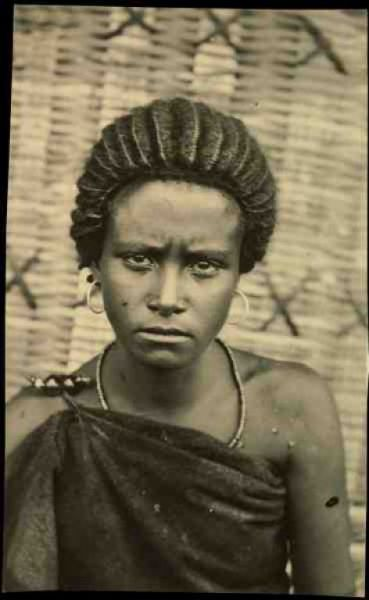

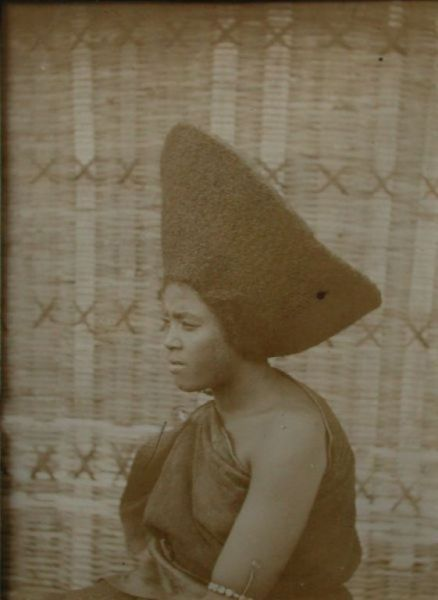

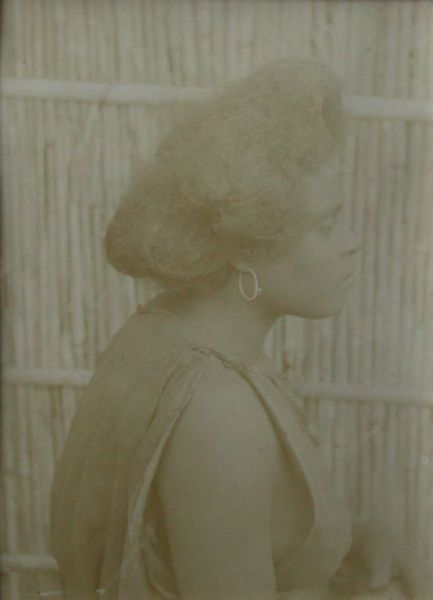

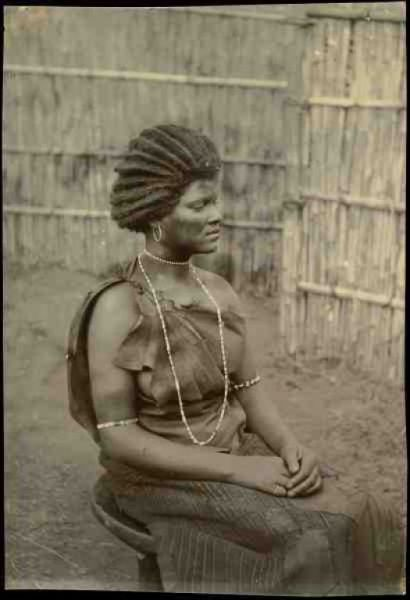

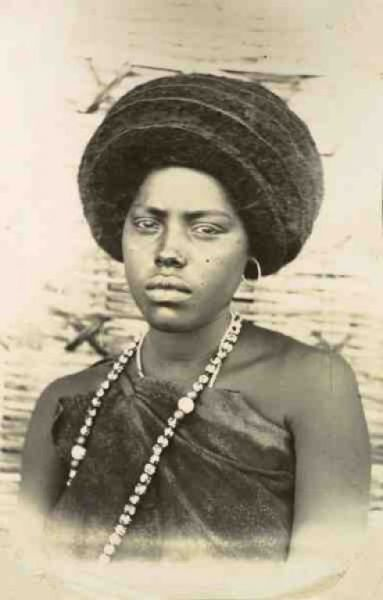

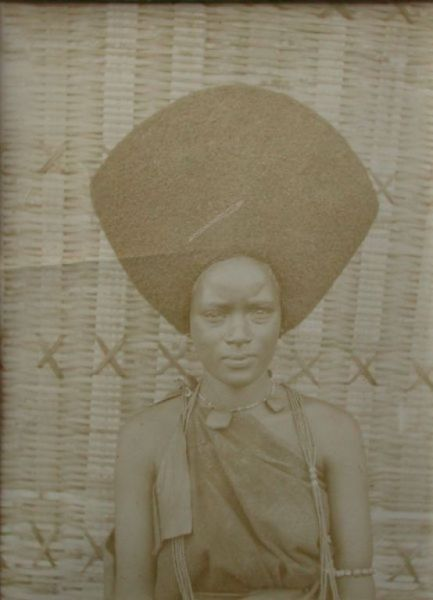

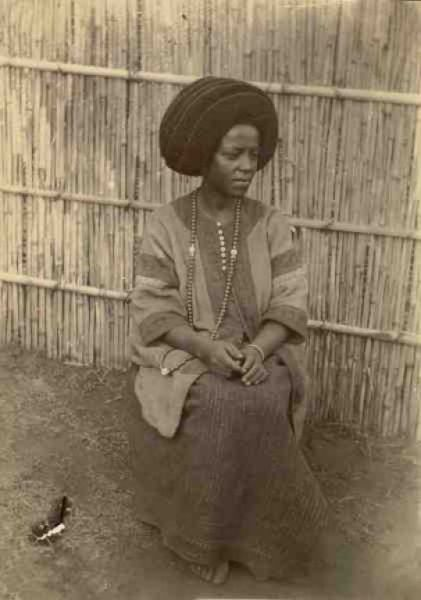

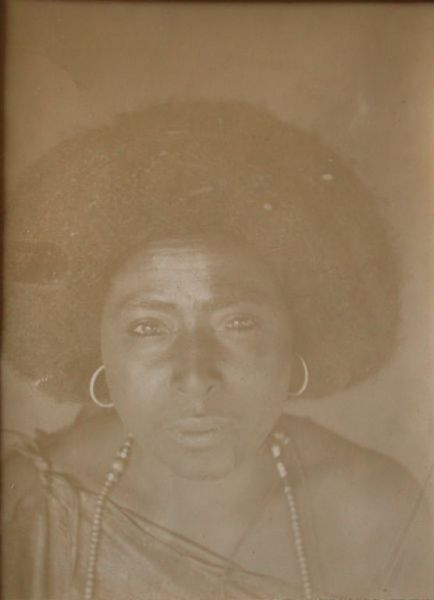

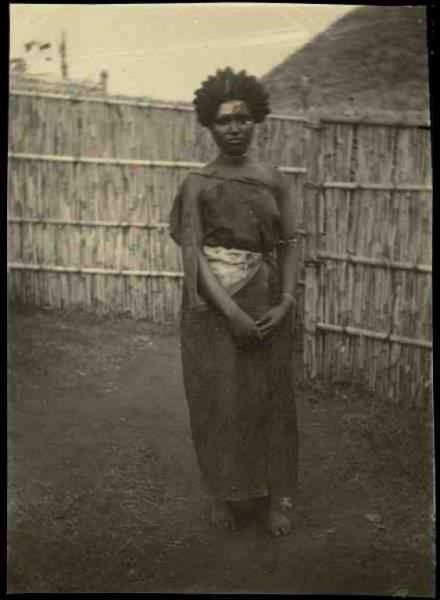

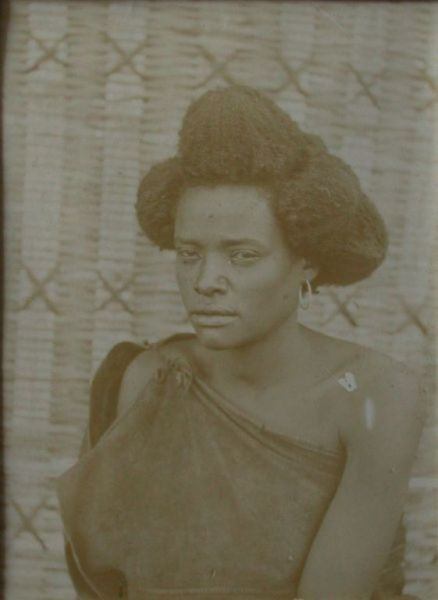

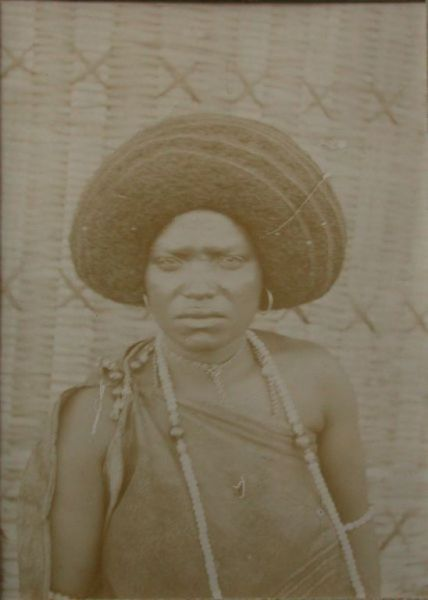

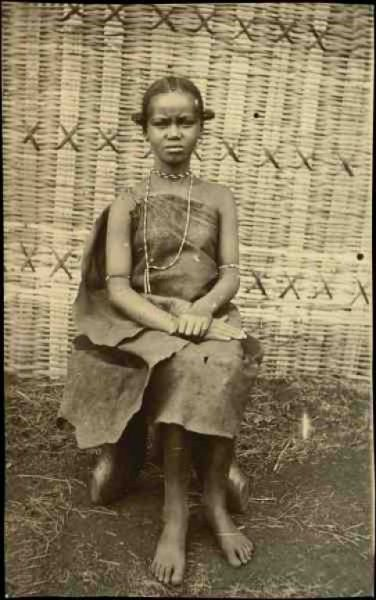

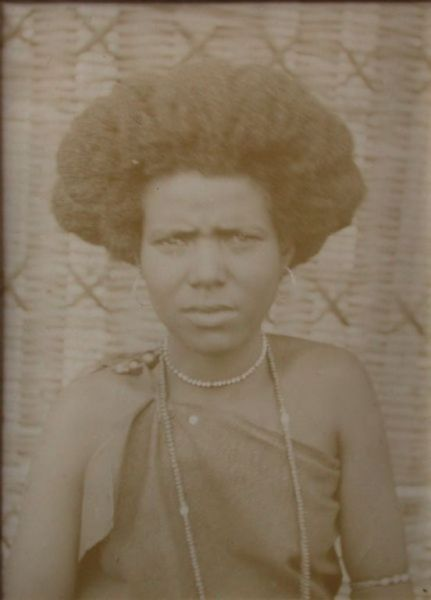

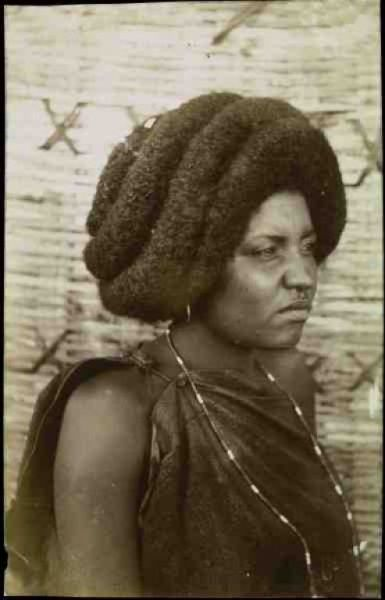

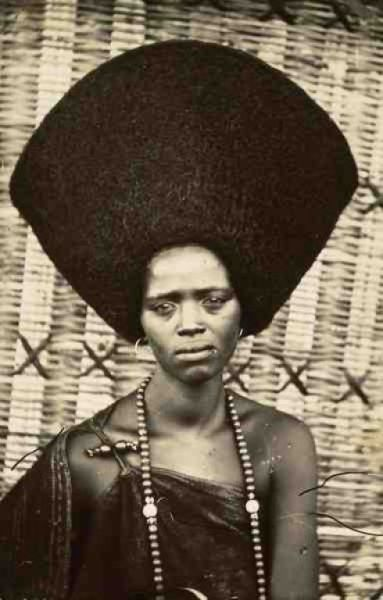

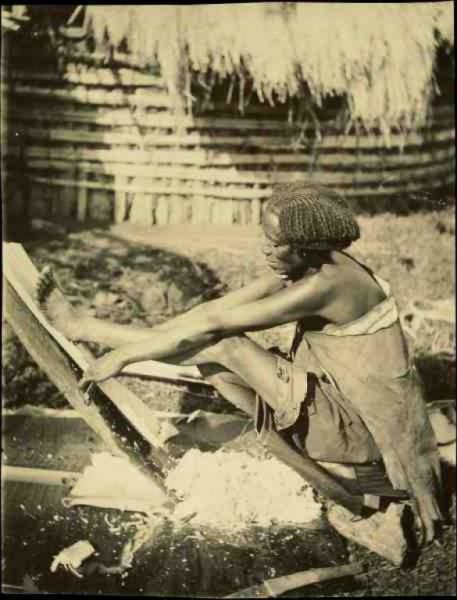

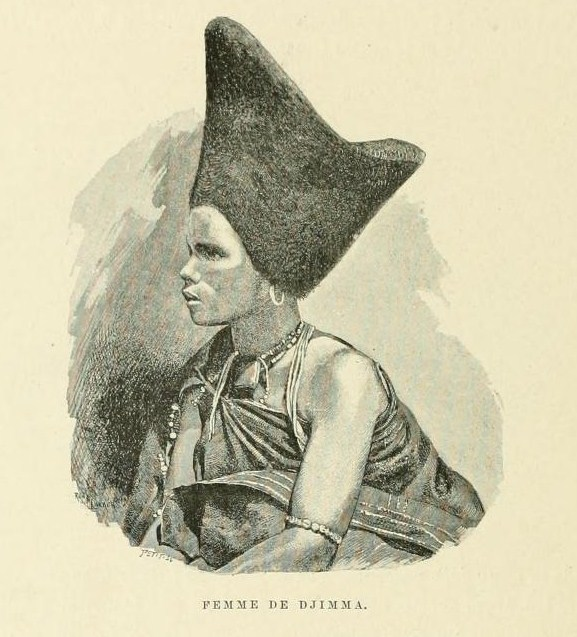

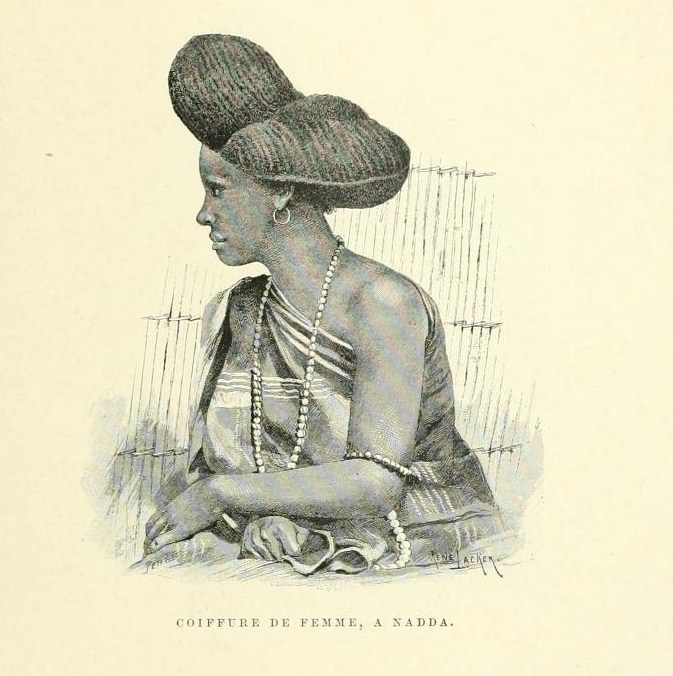

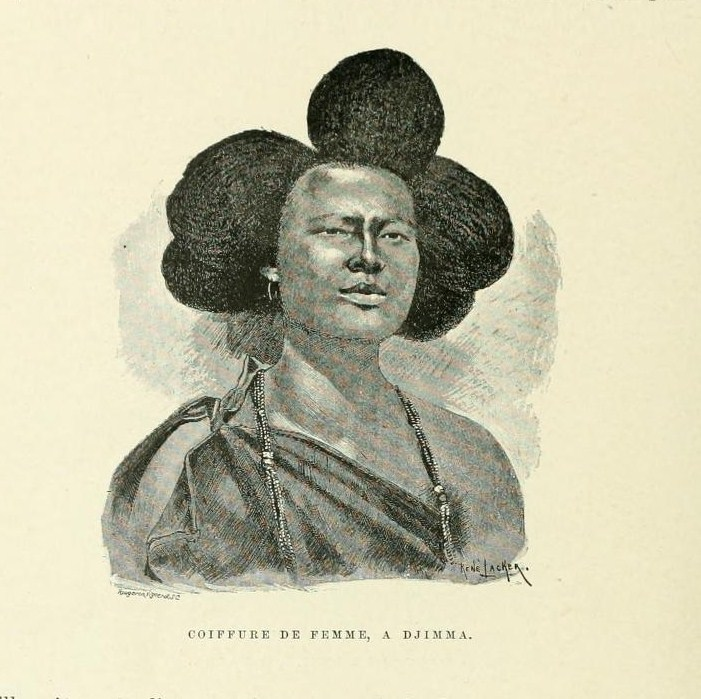

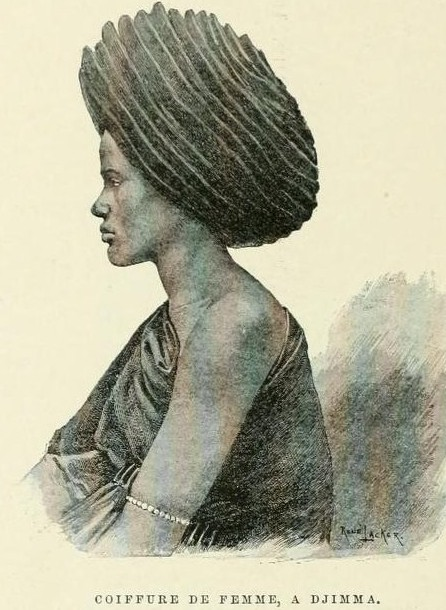

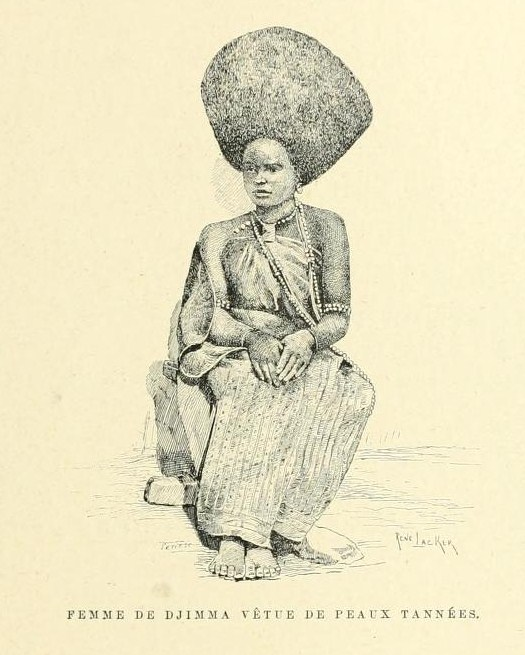

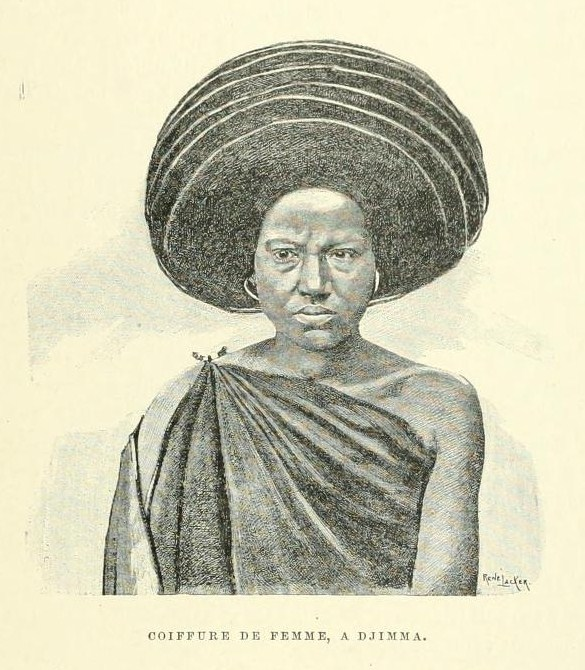

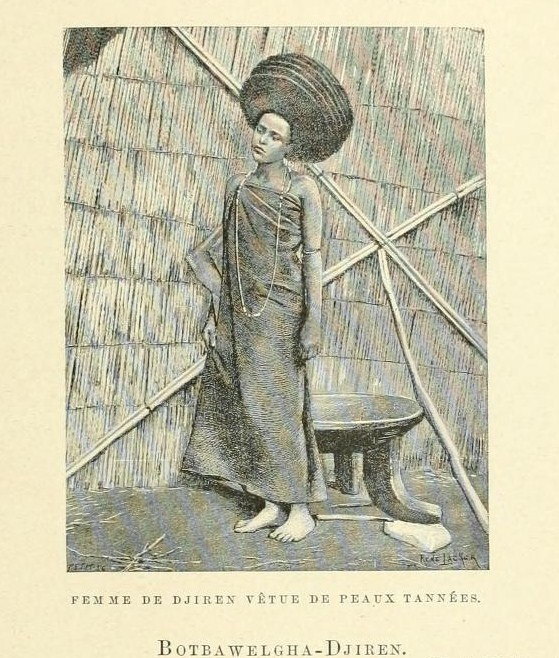
