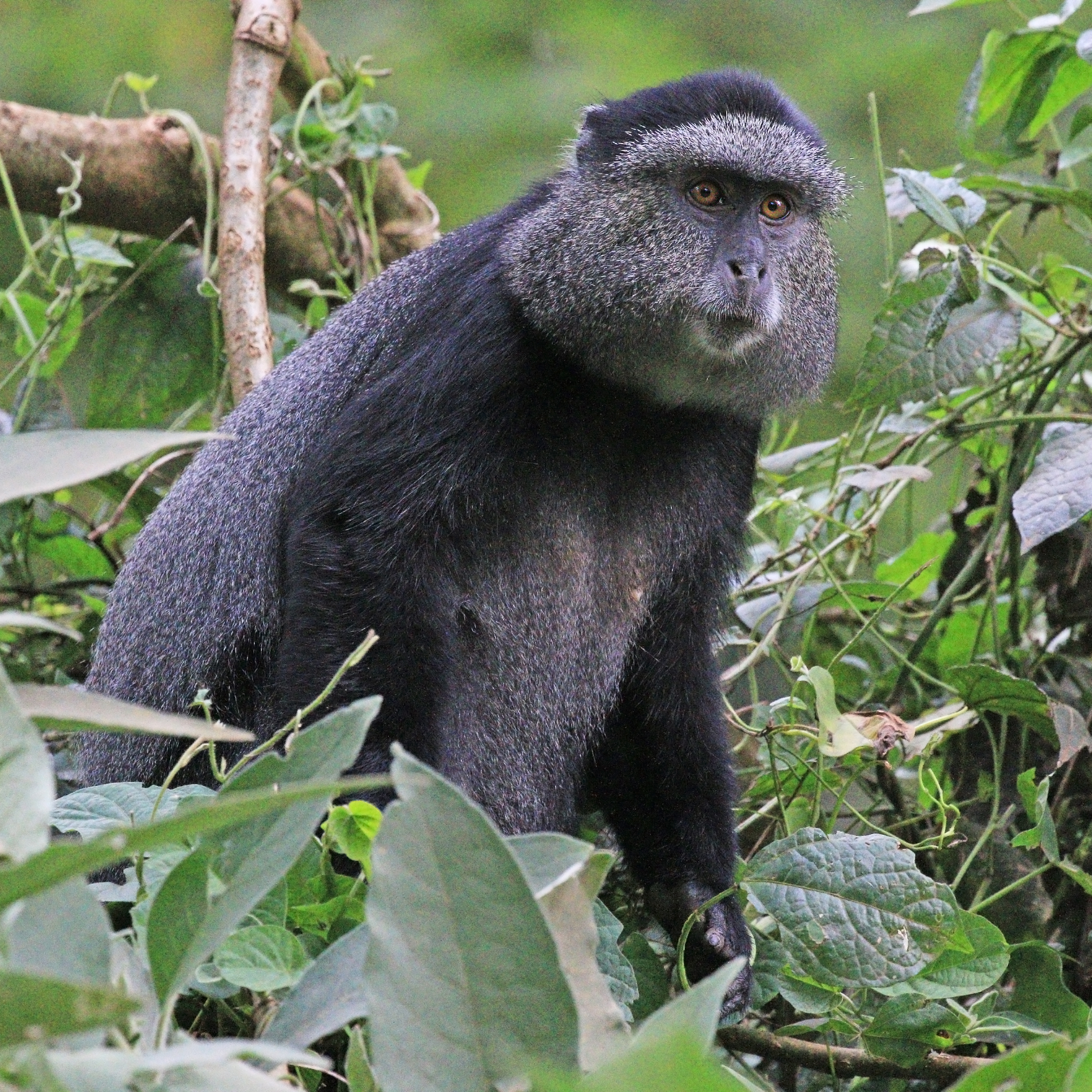
- C. m. stuhlmanni Kakamega Forest, Kenya

Conservation status
- Least Concern (IUCN 3.1)

Scientific classification
- Kingdom: Animalia
- Phylum: Chordata
- Class: Mammalia
- Order: Primates
- Family: Cercopithecidae
- Genus: Cercopithecus
- Species: C. mitis

Binomial name
- Cercopithecus mitis Wolf, 1822

Subspecies
- 6, see text
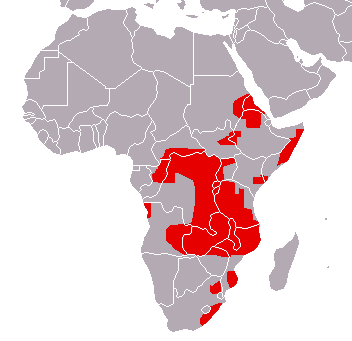
- Range (note: includes ranges of closely related Sykes', silver, and golden monkeys)

= Blue monkey =

Species of Old World monkey

The blue monkey or diademed monkey (Cercopithecus mitis) is a species of Old World monkey native to Central and East Africa, ranging from the upper Congo River basin east to the East African Rift and south to northern Angola and Zambia and populations further south down to South Africa. The taxonomy of this species has been disputed and Sykes' monkey, the silver monkey and the golden monkey are often regarded as subspecies.

== Subspecies ==
Several subspecies are recognised:

- Cercopithecus mitis boutourlinii – Boutourlini's blue monkey, found in Western Ethiopia. Identified and named by Leopoldo Traversi.
- Cercopithecus mitis elgonis – Elgon blue monkey
- Cercopithecus mitis heymansi – Lomami River blue monkey, found in Congo
- Cercopithecus mitis kolbi – Kolb's monkey, found in Kenya
- Cercopithecus mitis labiatus – Samango monkey, found in South Africa, Eswatini and southern Mozambique
- Cercopithecus mitis mitis – Pluto monkey, found in Angola
- Cercopithecus mitis moloneyi – Moloney's blue monkey
- Cercopithecus mitis opitsthosticus
- Cercopithecus mitis schoutedeni – Schouteden's blue monkey, found in Congo
- Cercopithecus mitis stuhlmanni – Stuhlmann's blue monkey

At times, some of these have been regarded as full species, and additional subspecies have been considered valid, while others are not recognized by all authorities.

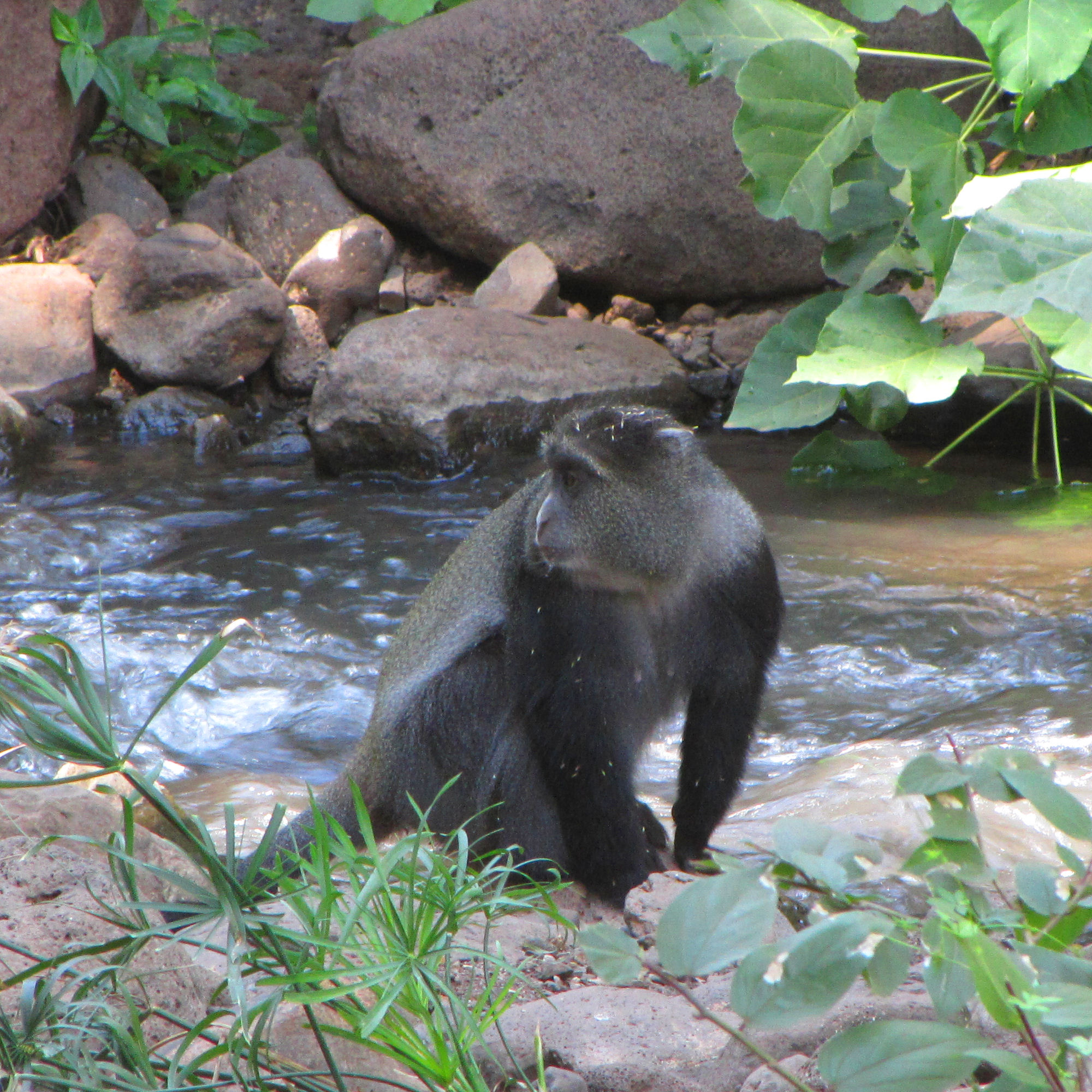
Lake Manyara National Park, Tanzania

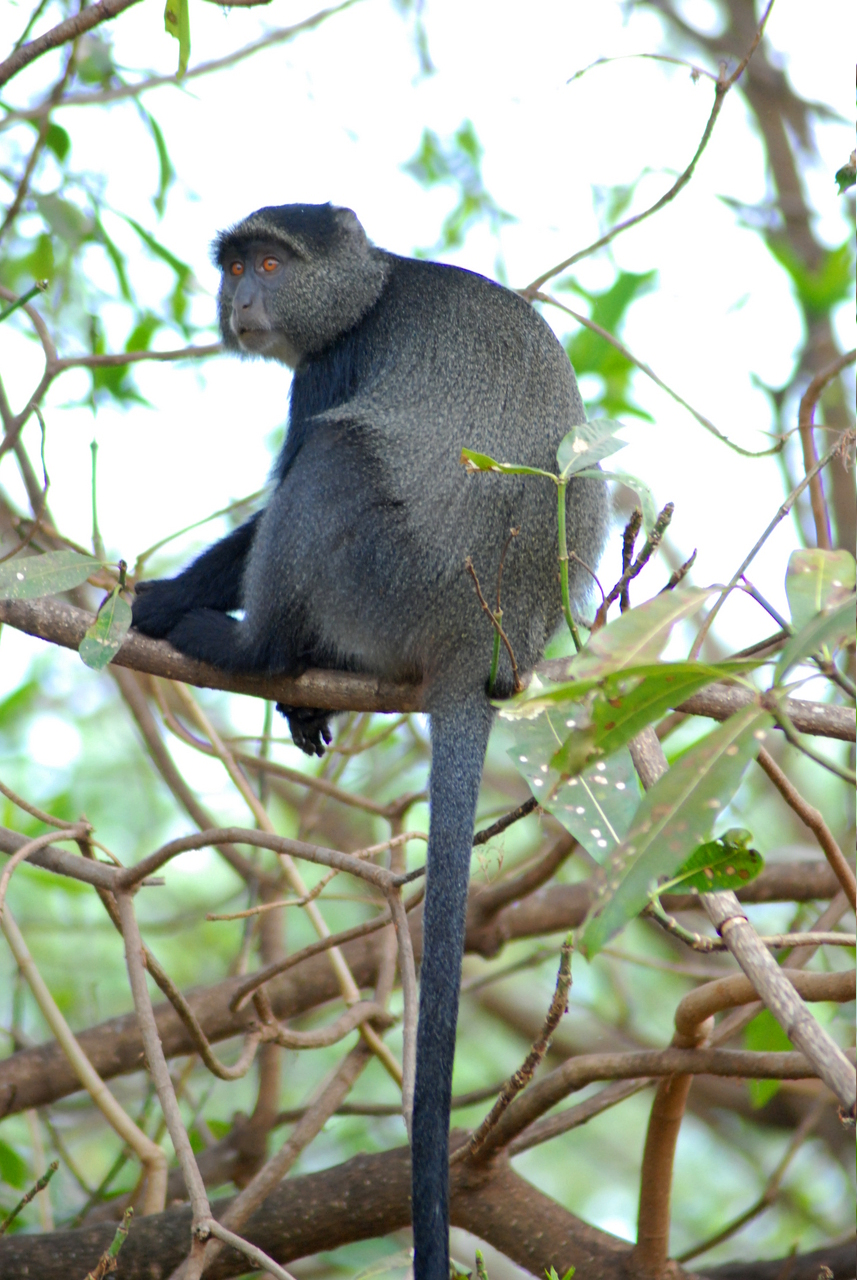
Lake Manyara National Park, Tanzania

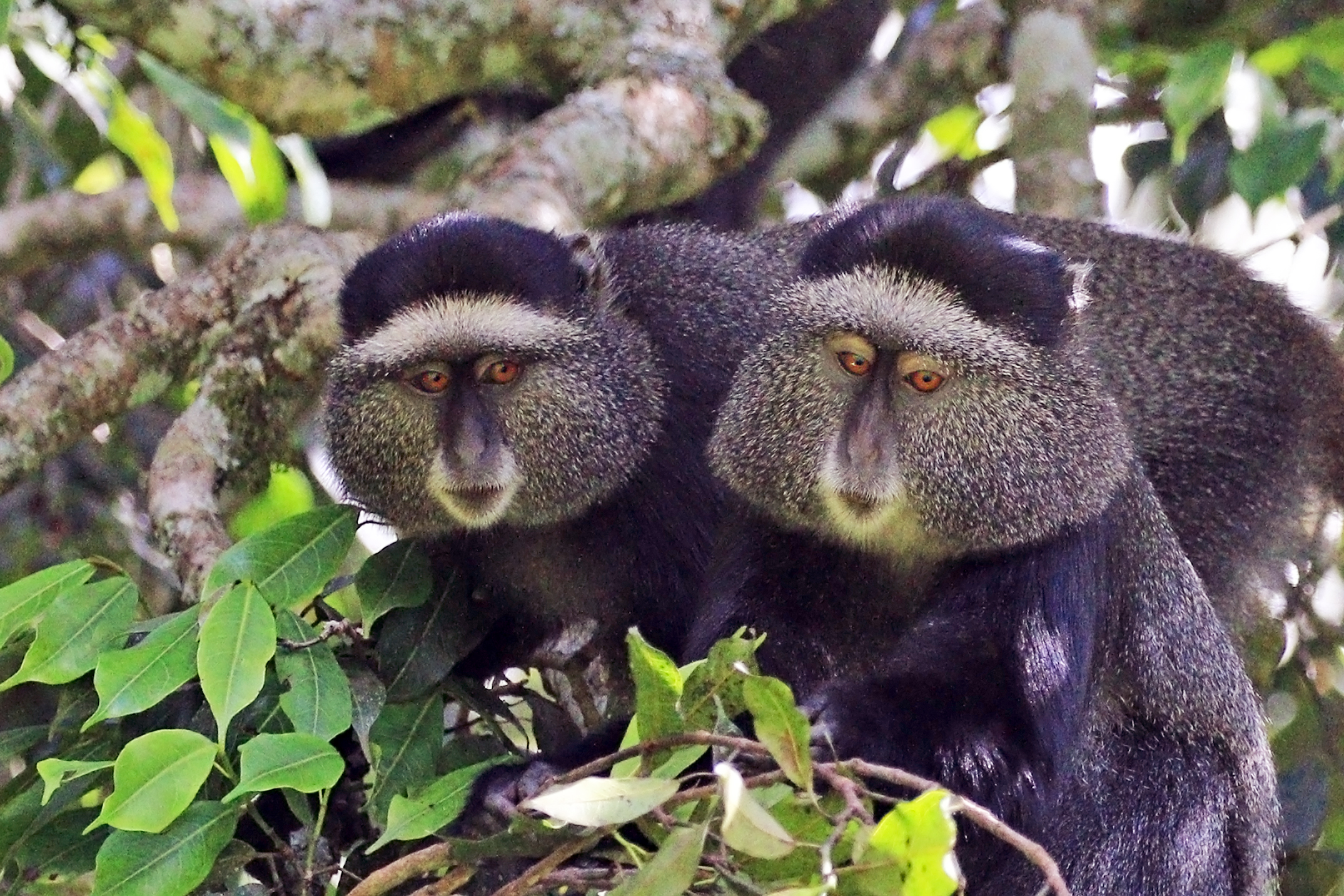
C. m. stuhlmanni
Kakamega Forest, Kenya

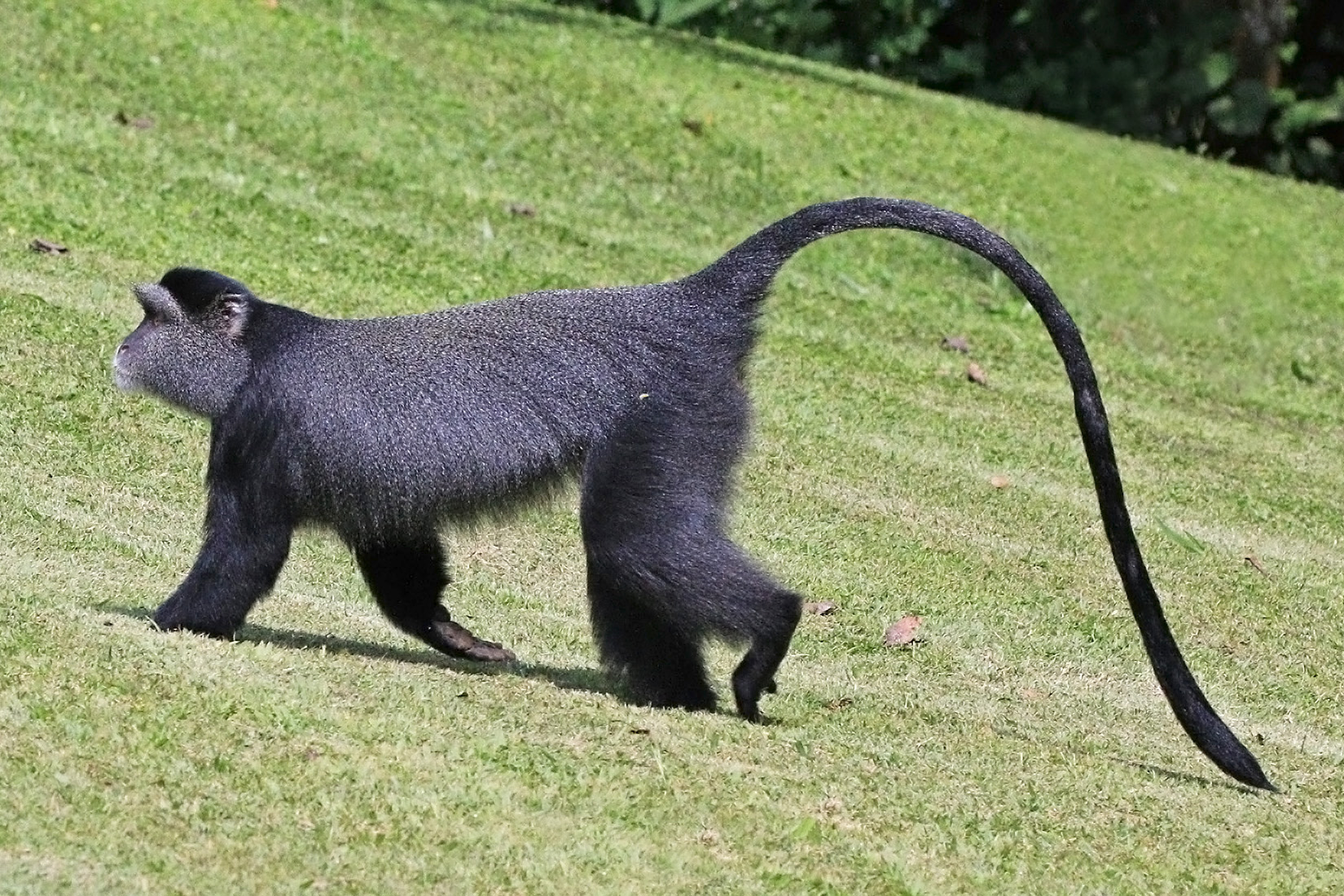
C. m. stuhlmanni
Kakamega Forest, Kenya

== Description ==
Like other mammals with the name "blue" (blue tick hound, blue wildebeest), the blue monkey often has a slaty-grey cast that can look blue to observers. It is mainly olive or grey apart from the face (which is dark with a pale or yellowish patch on the forehead – the "diadem" from which the species derives its common name), the blackish cap, feet, and front legs, and the mantle, which is brown, olive, or grey depending on the subspecies. Typical sizes range from 50 to 65 cm (20 to 26 in) in length, (not including the tail, which is almost as long as the rest of the animal), with females weighing a little over 4 kg (8.8 lb) and males up to 8 kg (18 lb).

== Ecology ==
=== Habitat ===
The blue monkey is found in evergreen forests and montane bamboo forests, and lives largely in the forest canopy, coming to the ground infrequently. It is very dependent on humid, shady areas with plenty of water. It eats mainly fruit and leaves, but will take some slower-moving invertebrates. It prefers to live in tall trees, which provide both food and shelter, and is, therefore, like almost all guenons, suffering from the loss of its natural habitat. Where pine plantations replace natural forest, the monkey may be treated as a threat by foresters, since it sometimes strips bark from exotic trees in a search for food or moisture. It is also hunted for bushmeat and as payback for crop-raiding.

=== Diet ===
Blue monkeys primarily eat fruits, including figs. They also eat insects, leaves, twigs, and flowers. "They are primarily frugivores, with 50% of their diet consisting of fruit, with leaves or insects being the main source of protein, with the rest of the diet being made up of seeds, flowers and fungi. [....] They eat a variety of plants but concentrate on a few species, which means their population density is generally dependent on plant species richness and diversity." Rarely, they eat vertebrates, such as lizards, birds, and small mammals including bushbabies.

== Behavior ==
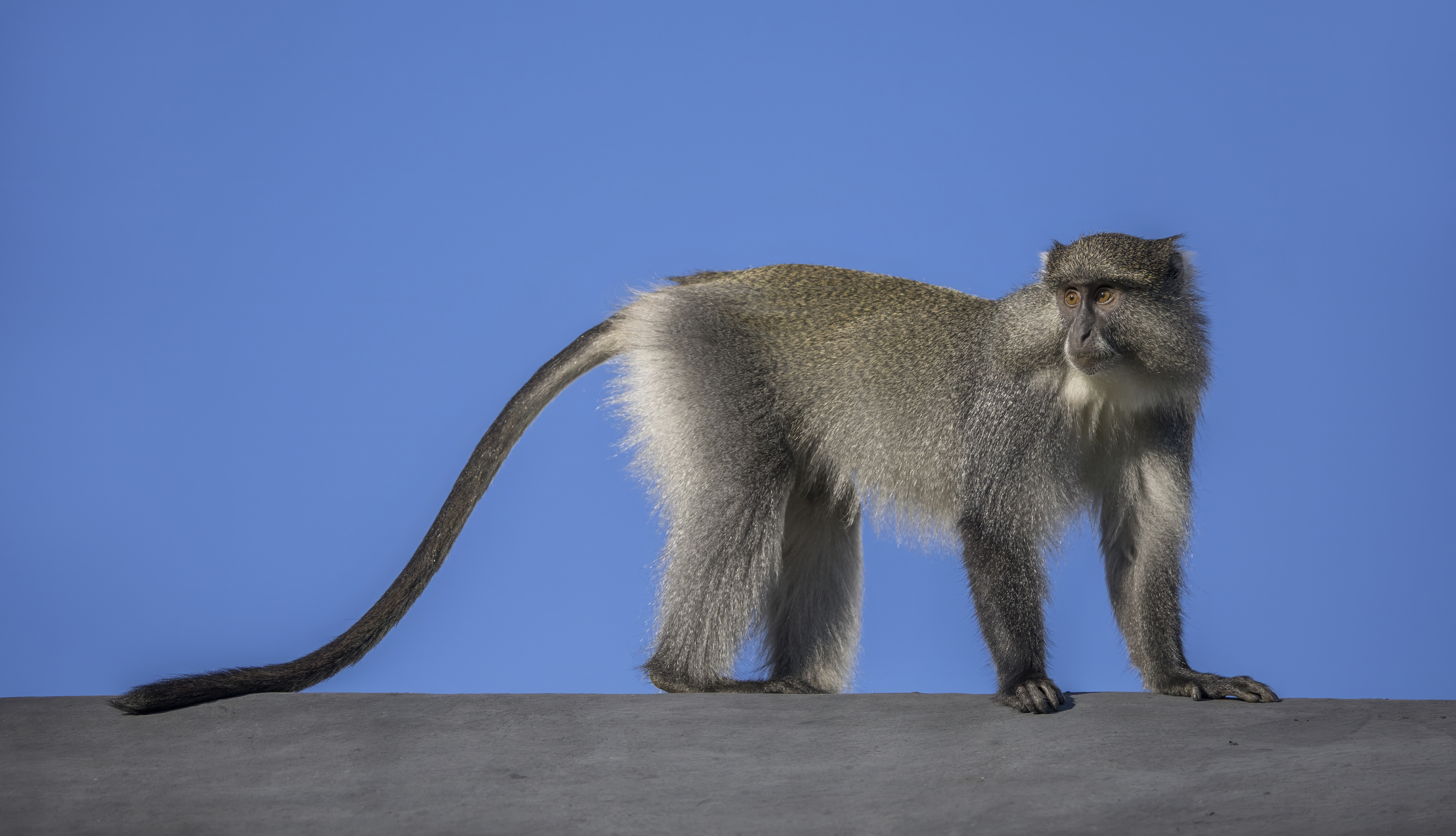
Cercopithecus mitis labiatus (Samango monkey) at Mount Sheba, South Africa

Cercopithecus mitis joins with the C. ascanius (red-tailed monkey) for extra protection. Its interactions with red-tailed monkeys include interspecies grooming. Their social system is mainly female because the males leave once they are mature. Males have little to no interaction with the young. C. mitis is very territorial, so young males must leave. They may challenge the dominant male of another family. If they defeat the dominant male, they take over leadership of that family, and this offers a place to live, socialization, and food supplies.

=== Social structure ===
The blue monkeys live in female-philopatric social systems where females stay in their natal groups, while males disperse once they reach adulthood. As a result, blue monkey groups usually consist of one male with several females and infants, giving rise to matrilinear societies. Occasionally, solitary males are observed, which are probably transient, having left their natal group in search of a new group.

==== Social relationships ====
In these female-bonded societies, only 5–15% of monkeys' activity budget is occupied by social interactions and the most common social interactions within a group are grooming and playing. Relationships between group members vary: infants interact most frequently with their peers and adult or juvenile females and are rarely seen near adult males.

Alloparenting is common among blue monkeys. The most common infant handlers are juvenile females, and usually one infant is carried by a number of alloparents. One hypothesis is that this allows the infant to learn to socialise at an early stage in life.

Interesting female-female relationships exist among blue monkeys. This relationship is believed to be shaped by their feeding ecology, which, in turn, is shaped by between-group and within-group competition. Blue monkey females exhibit strong, aggressive competition between groups and between other species because of their territorial character, but milder though more frequent competition within groups. Though earlier beliefs were that blue monkeys are not territorial, more current extended research shows that earlier researchers misinterpreted the results because social interactions overall are infrequent. Moreover, overall agonism rates in blue monkeys are very low. Within-group conflicts are mild and infrequent because females distance themselves from one another and feed at different sites to avoid competition. Although blue monkeys were believed to be egalitarian, current extended research confirms that linear dominance hierarchy occurs in female blue monkeys, which becomes more apparent when food resources are scarce.

=== Reproduction ===
The mating system is polygynous, with a corresponding sexual dimorphism in size, as the males are the substantially larger sex. Females normally give birth every two years, during the onset of the warm, rainy season; gestation is around five months, and the infants are born with fur and with their eyes open. Group sizes range from 10 to 40, containing only a single adult male. It is often found in groups with other species of monkeys such as the red-tailed monkey and various red colobus monkeys.

C. mitis males mate with more than one female, but the females only mate with one male. The female attracts males to copulate with her through body language. They breed throughout the year. "The groups can have up to 40 members and the females usually help to care for all of the young, not just their own."

== Predation ==
Blue monkeys likely fall prey to leopards. "Other potential predators include snakes and birds of prey."
