= Doggetts Fork, Virginia =

Unincorporated community in Virginia, United States

Coordinates: 37°53′55″N 77°21′07″W

Doggetts Fork is an unincorporated community in Caroline County, in the U.S. state of Virginia.
