= Leopoldo Traversi =

Leopoldo Rafaelle Traversi was an Italian explorer, physician, and medical missionary renowned for his management of the Lēt Marefīya medical and political outpost and his geographic and anthropological exploration of the southern regions of Ethiopia.

Leopoldo Traversi

== Early life ==
Leopoldo Traversi was born on 30 October 1856 in Piancastagnaio, Siena, Tuscany to Antonio Traversi and Elvira Babini. Traversi studied medicine in Florence, Italy (29 September 1882) and became a medical lieutenant in the Royal Italian Army. During his early career, he befriended Augusto Boutourlin (son of the Russian Count Dmitry Petrovich Boutourlin) and launched an expedition to Ethiopia in 1870 for medical and geographic exploratory purposes. Boutourlin fell ill quickly and passed away a few years later.

== Mission and exploration ==
=== Exploration ===
Traversi expanded his expedition from the Italian-controlled present-day Eritrea to central Ethiopia in 1886. He conducted a series of three geographic expeditions into Southern regions of Ethiopia, one in May/June, October, and December in 1886. Traversi performed extensive demographic and ecological research on the area.

He identified, described, categorized, and named, a species of monkey which he named in honor of his late friend cercopithecus bouturlinii (also referred to as Boutrurlini's Blue monkey).

Traversi was the first European to explore the source of the Awash River. Additionally, he outlined the specific location of Lake Ziway.

He was able to undergo these expeditions under Ethiopian royal protection due to his close relationship with Emperor Menelik II, serving as the emperor's personal physician at times.

In July 1887, Traversi’s southernmost expedition led to the mapping of rivers and lakes in the Jimma region. Traversi was accompanied by King Abba Jifar II at points throughout the journey.

=== Medical mission ===
In July 1888, Traversi become the director of Lēt Marefīya, the base station of Italian exploration in the region at the time. He successfully established and maintained medical work until 1894. Traversi ensured efficient hospital operations despite severe famine in the area. Travesi collaborated with Vincenzo Ragazzi (discoverer of Leptopelis ragazzii) to distribute Quinine to treat malaria alongside emetics.

Traversi was given additional political responsibilities in 1890-1894 which hindered medical and geographic capabilities.

== Later life and legacy ==
Traversi was expelled from Ethiopia in April 1892 after a political disagreement with Emperor Menelik II. Traversi returned in February 1893 to try and reconcile but was unable to do so. Traversi and his successor Colonel Federico Pianno were both exiled to Italy just before the Battle of Adwa which largely removed Ethiopia from Italian control and influence.

After returning to Italy, Traversi married Giuseppa in 1896. Traversi was granted a gold medal by the Instituto Coloniale Italiano. Lēt Marefīya was abandoned by the Italians in 1895, now part of the Ankober Debre Sina Encarpment, a Key Biodiversity Area due to its unique flora and fauna.

Traversi died on January 3, 1949 in his home in Rome, Italy at the age of 93. Traversi’s memoirs and photographs lent a unique perspective on the communities in early Ethiopia and his medical expertise provided lifesaving care to the Lēt Marefīya community.
