= Walter Grimwood Doggett =

British naturalist and collector (1876–1904)

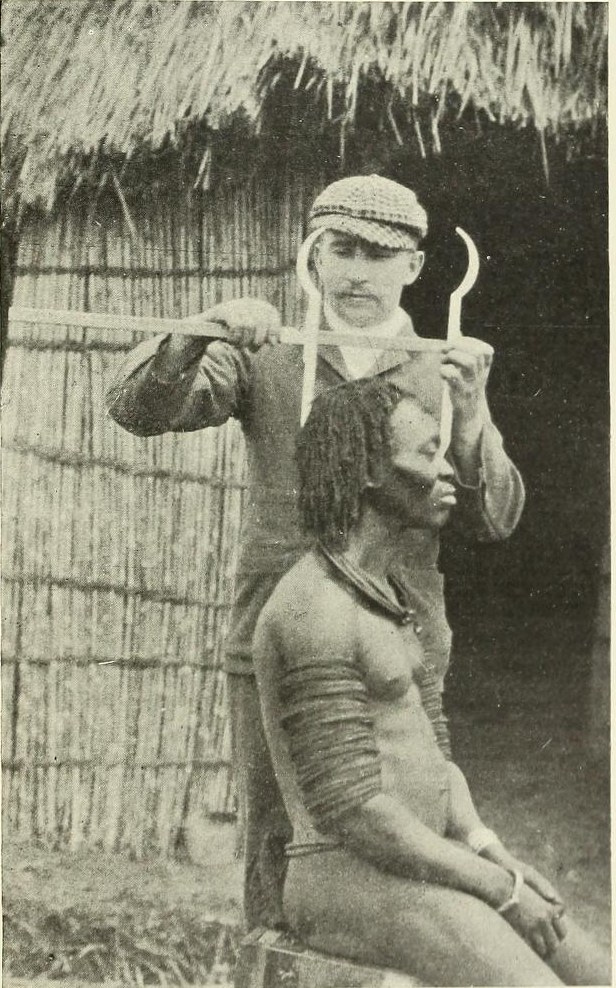

Walter Grimwood Doggett (26 August 1876 – 3 January 1904) was a British naturalist and collector who worked in Uganda. He collected natural history specimens for the British Museum (Natural History) and for private collectors like Walter Rothschild.

Doggett was the son of Cambridge naturalist and taxidermist Frederick Doggett (1843–1921). He joined Sir Harry Johnston to Uganda in 1899 as a naturalist on the recommendation of P. L. Sclater. He later worked in the Uganda Protectorate as a member of the Boundary Survey under Colonel Charles Delmé-Radcliffe. He collected specimens extensively in the region and the plant Rubus doggetti was named after him. He was among the first white naturalists to see the giant forest pig in Africa although he did not describe it formally. He was also an illustrator and photographer. He was collecting fish specimens in the Kagera river using a native canoe when he drowned.
