= John Doggett (columnist) =

American academic (born 1947)

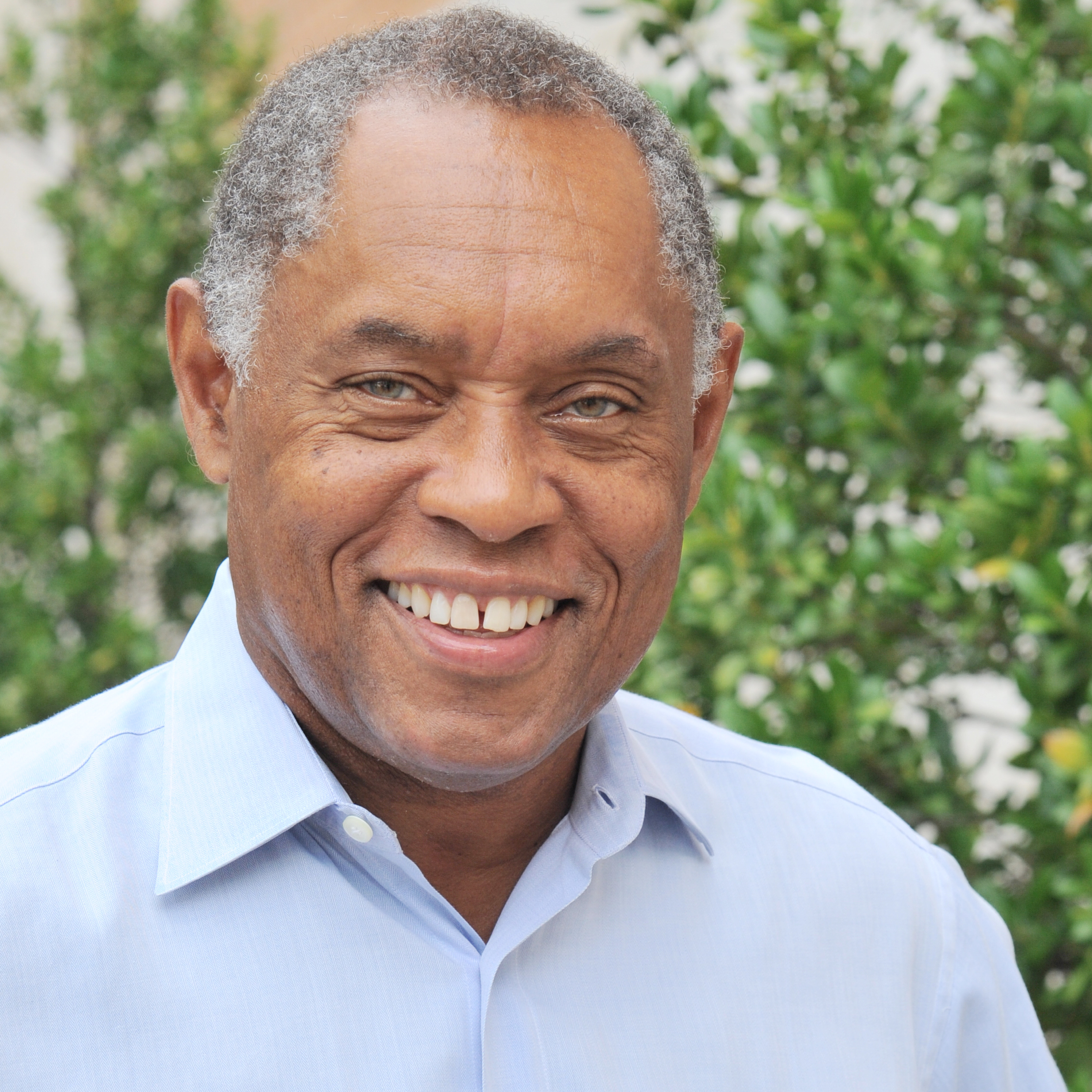
John N. Doggett III

John N. Doggett III is an American Professor of Instruction at the McCombs School of Business of The University of Texas at Austin (UT). Doggett was born in San Francisco, California on October 26, 1947 and raised in Pasadena and Los Angeles, California.

In 1991, Doggett testified before the U.S. Senate Judiciary Committee on behalf of Clarence Thomas, during Thomas' SCOTUS confirmation hearings. (Thomas, who had been nominated to the U.S. Supreme Court by then-President George Herbert Walker Bush, had been accused of sexual harassment by law professor Anita Hill.)

Doggett is an alumnus of Claremont McKenna College, where he was the founder of the Black Student Union.

Doggett is also an alumnus of Yale Law School, and Harvard Business School. Doggett and his wife have been married since February, 2001.

== See also ==
- Black conservatism in the United States
